= The Midnight Run Action Pack =

1994 film series

The Midnight Run Action Pack was a television film series for Universal Television's Action Pack TV programming block in 1994. All three movies are available as a DVD set in Canada. The three films are sequels to the 1988 action comedy film Midnight Run starring Robert De Niro and Charles Grodin.

== Another Midnight Run ==
Jack Walsh (Christopher McDonald) is still trying to make a living by tracking down skips. It turns out his bail bondsman friend Eddie Moscone (Dan Hedaya) has two jumpers, Bernie Abbot and Helen Bishop, a husband-and-wife con team who have been scamming people wherever they go. Eddie offers Jack $25,000 to go after the husband. He already offered rival bounty hunter Marvin (Ed O'Ross) $20,000 to go after the wife. Jack heads for San Francisco to bring back to husband, but by a chance he tries to bring both in for $45,000. It becomes a tough ride for Jack when he deals with their secret codes and tricks along the way.

The film was released on February 6, 1994.

== Midnight Runaround ==
Jack (McDonald) is heavily in debt and it's his daughter's birthday. He is forced to put his friendship with his boss, Eddie (Hedaya), in peril when Jack takes a job for a rival company. It amounts to a suicide mission: he has to go to Oklahoma for Dale Adder (Kyle Secor), who got in trouble for a DUI in Los Angeles and jumped bail. He is a handsome young criminal who has a lethal reputation with the ladies. Any bounty hunter who has tried this job didn't come home in one piece. Jack is now faced with a hostile greeting from the locals when they try to prevent him from taking Dale back to Los Angeles. And without a gun, Jack only has one weapon on his side: a really bad attitude.

The film was released on March 15, 1994.

== Midnight Run for Your Life ==
Lorna Bellstratten (Melora Walters) is a waitress with a dream for show business. However, she is wanted by the police, drug dealers, and a hit man she has hired. She narrowly escaped death in an explosion meant to kill her and an undercover cop. The cops suspect her of being in on the explosion with her drug dealer boyfriend, Michael Vega (Vincent Guastaferro) – whom she believes is a movie producer. When Vega poses as Lorna's father, he hires Los Angeles bail bondsman Eddie Moscone (Hedaya) to send a bounty hunter to track her down. Of course, Eddie wants Jack to do the job since Jack is the best at what he does. All Jack has to do is find Lorna and bring her back to Los Angeles alive. Jack and Lorna discover another problem, though... they're falling in love.

The third film was written by Shaun Cassidy. This film was released on June 11, 1994.
