= Midnight Run for Your Life =

- Genre: Action; Comedy
- Based on: Characters by George Gallo
- Written by: Shaun Cassidy
- Directed by: Daniel Sackheim
- Starring: Christopher McDonald; Melora Walters; Dan Hedaya; John Fleck; Vincent Guastaferro; Richard Bradford; Millie Perkins
- Music by: David Bergeaud
- Country of origin: United States
- Original language: English

Production
- Producers: Tony To; Ellen Erwin
- Cinematography: Robert Draper
- Editors: Chip Masamitsu; David D. Lurie
- Running time: 90 minutes
- Production company: Universal Television

Original release
- Release: June 11, 1994

Related
- Midnight Runaround

Midnight Run for Your Life is a 1994 made-for-television film, and the third and final entry in a series of television films produced for Universal Television's Action Pack programming block and based on the 1988 film Midnight Run. Christopher McDonald, who played Jack Walsh in previous installments Another Midnight Run and Midnight Runaround, reprises the role.

== Plot ==
Lorna Bellstratten (Walters), a waitress with dreams of being in show business, is duped by her drug-dealer boyfriend Michael Vega (Guastaferro) into delivering a bomb to an undercover cop. Though Lorna survives the explosion (intended to kill her and the cop), she finds herself—as the only material witness to the crime she unwittingly abetted—wanted by both the cops and the mob (Vega's employers). Distraught, Lorna flees to Cabo San Lucas, Mexico and takes out a contract on her own life (suicide-by-hitman.) Meanwhile, Vega (posing as Lorna's father) hires Los Angeles bail bondsman, Eddie Moscone (Hedaya) to send in a bounty hunter to bring her back to LA alive. Eddie offers the job to bounty hunter Jack Walsh (McDonald) for $10,000. He doesn't want to take the job because Eddie keeps on stiffing him his money. Eddie threatens to give the job to rival bounty hunter Marvin Dorfler, who does not make an appearance. When Walsh finds her in Cabo San Lucas, Lorna thinks he's her hitman. After a night of dancing, Lorna finds out the truth, hits Walsh out of anger and returns to her hotel room in a huff. Walsh's attempt to recover her is initially thwarted by the untimely arrival of the real hit-man, but they escape—with the hitman, the cops, and Vega's goons all hot on their trail. Along the way, the still-despondent Lorna keeps looking for—and finding—all manner of new ways to kill herself. For Jack Walsh, there's another problem—he's falling in love.

== Cast ==
- Christopher McDonald as Jack Walsh
- Melora Walters as Lorna Bellstratten
- Vincent Guastaferro as Michael Vega
- Dan Hedaya as Eddie Moscone
- John Fleck as Jerry Geisler
- Richard Bradford as Lt. Breem
- Steve Hytner as Sgt. Pickett
- LaTanya Richardson as Det. Dixon
- Louis Mustillo as Hector
- Stephen Lee as Benny
- Michael Beach as Pemberton
