= Michael Duggan =

American television producer and writer

Michael Duggan began his career writing in 1981 for the TV show Hill Street Blues and then moved on to shows such as St. Elsewhere and Law & Order. He began producing television shows in 1984 with Miami Vice and Midnight Run. Duggan has executive produced the series Earth 2 and part of the third season of Millennium.

== Writer ==
- Miss Miami (2002)
- Secret Agent Man (2000)
- Millennium (1998)
- C-16: FBI (1997)
- Brooklyn South (1997)
- Earth 2 (1994)
- Crime & Punishment (1993)
- Law & Order (1990–1992)
- Nasty Boys (1990)
- Miami Vice (1988)
- St. Elsewhere (1982)
- Hill Street Blues (1981)

== Producer ==
- Miss Miami (2002)
- Secret Agent Man (2000)
- Millennium (1996–1998)
- C-16: FBI (1997)
- Earth 2 (1994–1995)
- Midnight Runaround (1994)
- Another Midnight Run (1994)
- Crime & Punishment (1993)
- Law & Order (1990–1993)
- Nasty Boys (1990)
- Midnight Run (1988)
- Miami Vice (1984–1989)

== Director ==
- The F**k-It List (2019)

== Creative consultant ==
- Millennium (1996)
- H.E.L.P. (1990)
