= Christopher McDonald =

American actor (born 1955)

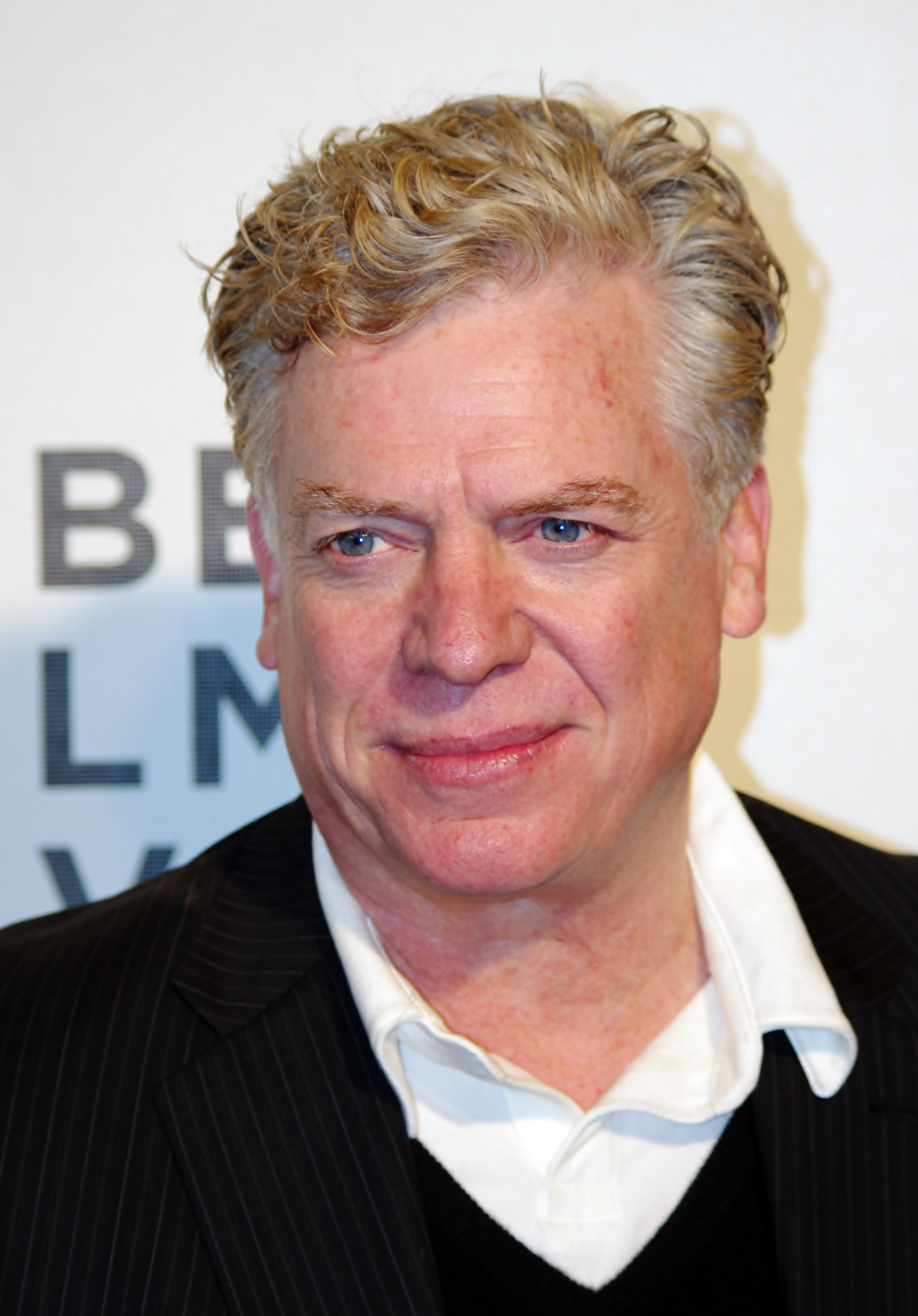
- McDonald in 2011
- Born: February 15, 1955 (age 71); Waterloo, New York, U.S.
- Education: Hobart College
- Occupation: Actor
- Years active: 1978–present
- Spouse: Lupe Gidley (m. 1992)
- Children: 4
- Relatives: Daniel McDonald (brother)

Christopher McDonald (born February 15, 1955) is an American actor. He is best known for his villainous role as professional golfer Shooter McGavin in the 1996 sports comedy Happy Gilmore, a role he reprised in its 2025 sequel. McDonald also acted in films such as Grease 2 (1982), Thelma & Louise (1991), Quiz Show (1994), Leave It to Beaver (1997), Flubber (1997), The Iron Giant (1999), Requiem for a Dream (2000), and The House Bunny (2008).

In 2022 and 2026, McDonald was nominated for a Primetime Emmy Award for Outstanding Guest Actor in a Comedy Series for his role as casino CEO Marty Ghilain on the HBO Max show Hacks (2021–2026). Other notable television credits include a lead role in Family Law (1999–2002) and recurring roles in Boardwalk Empire (2010–2012) and Impeachment: American Crime Story (2021).

== Personal life ==
McDonald was born in Waterloo, New York to Patricia, a nursing professor and real estate agent, and James R. McDonald, an educator and high school principal.

A practicing Catholic of Irish descent, he and his siblings were raised in Romulus. He graduated from Romulus Central School in 1973, and later earned a degree from Hobart College in Geneva, where he played football and soccer. He was also a member of the Kappa Alpha Society. On his 52nd birthday, his younger brother, actor and singer Daniel McDonald, died of brain cancer. He is a prominent fan of the Buffalo Bills and a friend of former Bills quarterback Jim Kelly.

McDonald was engaged to future Thelma & Louise co-star Geena Davis for a period in the mid-80s until 1985, when she left him for Jeff Goldblum. He met actress Lupe Gidley in 1989 when they performed together in a theatre production in New Mexico. They married in 1992 and have four children.

== Career ==
In 1978, McDonald appeared as a contestant on The Dating Game. McDonald has numerous film and television roles, often as a supporting actor and often portraying villains. His credits include Grease 2 (1982), Breakin' (1984), Where the Boys Are '84 (1984), The Boys Next Door (1985), Outrageous Fortune (1987), Thelma & Louise (1991), Fatal Instinct (1993), Grumpy Old Men (1993), Quiz Show (1994), the HBO film The Tuskegee Airmen (1995), Happy Gilmore (1996), Celtic Pride (1996), House Arrest (1996), Flubber (1997), Dirty Work (1998), The Faculty (1998), The Skulls (2000), The Perfect Storm (2000), Spy Kids 2: The Island of Lost Dreams (2002), Broken Flowers (2005), Rumor Has It (2005), American Pie Presents: The Naked Mile (2006), American Pie Presents: Beta House (2007), and Superhero Movie (2008). In 1994, he starred in the film Terminal Velocity as an aggressive Russian mafia villain. He was featured as Ward Cleaver in the film version of Leave It to Beaver (1997). He also played Tappy Tibbons in Requiem for a Dream (2000), and was in The House Bunny (2008) and About Last Night (2014).

In television, along with a starring role on the television series Walter & Emily (1991–1992), Family Law (1999–2002), Cracking Up (2004–2006), and recurring roles on North Shore (2004), Veronica's Closet (1997–1999), Good Advice (1993–1994), and Harry's Law (2011–2012), McDonald has also made guest appearances on Matlock, Cheers, Riptide, Knight Rider, The Sopranos, Psych, both the 1985 and the 2002 versions of The Twilight Zone, Home Improvement, Las Vegas, the Law & Order franchise, Stargate Universe, and Star Trek: The Next Generation. He also played the eponymous lead in Peter Gabriel's 2002 music video for the song "The Barry Williams Show".

McDonald has also done voice work, including Jor-El in Superman: The Animated Series and Justice League Unlimited, and an older version of Superman in Batman Beyond. He also voiced the determined government agent Kent Mansley in the animated film The Iron Giant (1999). He subbed for Burt Reynolds as Boss Hogg in The Dukes of Hazzard: The Beginning (2007). In 2009, McDonald lent his voice talents in the Thomas Nelson audio Bible production known as The Word of Promise. In this dramatized audio, McDonald played the role of Luke.

McDonald replaced Robert De Niro in the Midnight Run film franchise, playing Jack Walsh in three 1994 films: Another Midnight Run, Midnight Runaround, and Midnight Run for Your Life. He portrayed mountaineer Jon Krakauer in the ABC film Into Thin Air: Death on Everest (1997), famous baseball broadcaster Mel Allen in the HBO film 61* (2001), baseball player Joe DiMaggio in the ESPN original series The Bronx Is Burning (2007) and U.S. Attorney General Harry M. Daugherty on HBO's Boardwalk Empire (2010–2012). In October 2013, McDonald started filming for A Conspiracy on Jekyll Island. Under the title The Crash, it was released direct-to-video in 2017. McDonald also played Texas revolution soldier Henry Karnes in History Channel's Texas Rising (2015), and Clinton lawyer Robert S. Bennett on FX's Impeachment: American Crime Story (2021).

McDonald appeared as Murphy in the Broadway show The Front Page at the Broadhurst Theater, which opened in late 2016.

In 2021, McDonald joined the cast of Hacks on HBO Max as Las Vegas casino owner Marty Ghilain, receiving two Primetime Emmy Award for Outstanding Guest Actor in a Comedy Series nominations for his role. In May 2021, he was cast in the Disney+ series Secret Invasion as Chris Stearns, a Skrull council member, set in the Marvel Cinematic Universe, which premiered in 2023. In 2023, McDonald appeared in the music video for country music duo The Reklaws' song "Honky Tonkin' About" with Drake Milligan.

In 2025, McDonald reprised his role as Shooter McGavin in Happy Gilmore 2.

== Filmography ==
=== Film ===
Year	Title	Role	Notes
1980	The Hearse	Pete	
1982	Grease 2	Bradley "Goose" McKenzie	
1982	The Black Room	Terry	
1984	Where the Boys Are '84	Tony	
1984	Breakin'	James	
1984	Chattanooga Choo Choo	Alex O'Donnell	
1985	The Boys Next Door	Detective Mark Woods	
1987	Outrageous Fortune	George	
1988	Paramedics	Mike "Mad Mike"	
1989	Cool Blue	Peter Sin	
1989	Chances Are	Louie Jeffries	
1990	Playroom	Chris	
1991	Thelma & Louise	Darryl Dickinson	
1991	Dutch	Reed Standish	
1991	Wild Orchid II: Two Shades of Blue	Senator Dixon	
1993	Cover Story	Sam Sparks	
1993	Benefit of the Doubt	Dan	
1993	Conflict of Interest	Mickey Flannery	
1993	Fatal Instinct	Frank Kelbo	
1993	Bums	Sergeant Andrew Holloman	
1993	Grumpy Old Men	Mike	
1994	Roadflower	Glen Lerolland	
1994	Monkey Trouble	Tom	
1994	Terminal Velocity	Kerr	
1994	Quiz Show	Jack Barry	
1995	My Teacher's Wife	Roy Mueller	
1995	Forget Paris	Zeus	Voice
1995	Best of the Best 3: No Turning Back	Sheriff Jack Banning	
1995	Fair Game	Lieutenant Meyerson	
	The Tuskegee Airmen	Major Sherman Joy	
1996	Happy Gilmore	Shooter McGavin	
1996	Unforgettable	Stewart Gleick	
1996	Celtic Pride	Coach Kimball	
1996	House Arrest	Donald Krupp	
1996	The Rich Man's Wife	Tony Potenza	
1997	Leave It to Beaver	Ward Cleaver	
1997	A Smile Like Yours	Richard Halstrom	
1997	Flubber	Wilson Croft	
1997	The Eighteenth Angel	Hugh Stanton	
1997	Lawn Dogs	Morton Stockard	
1998	Dirty Work	Travis Cole	
1998	Jaded	Jack Carlson	
1998	SLC Punk!	Mr. Levy	
1998	Gideon	Alan Longhurst	
1998	The Faculty	Mr. Connor	
1998	Divorce: A Contemporary Western	Tony	
1999	Five Aces	Ash Gray	
1999	The Iron Giant	Kent Mansley	Voice
2000	Magicians	Jake	
2000	Takedown	Mitch Gibson	
2000	The Skulls	Martin Lombard	
2000	Isn't She Great	Brad Bradburn	
2000	Requiem for a Dream	"Tappy" Tibbons	
2000	The Perfect Storm	Todd Gross	
2001	The Theory of the Leisure Class	Buddy Barnett	
2001	The Man Who Wasn't There	Macadam Salesman	
2001	61*	Mel Allen	
2002	Speakeasy	Dr. Addams	
2002	Spy Kids 2: The Island of Lost Dreams	President of The United States	
2002	Children on Their Birthdays	"Speedy" Thorne	
2003	Grind	Mr. Rivers	
2005	The L.A. Riot Spectacular	Officer Koon	
2005	Broken Flowers	Ron Anderson	
2005	Rumor Has It...	Roger McManus	
2006	Funny Money	Vic Johnson	
2006	American Pie Presents: The Naked Mile	Harry Stifler	Direct-to-video
2007	Kickin' It Old Skool	Marty Schumacher	
2007	My Sexiest Year	Adult Jake Stein	
2007	Awake	Dr. Larry Lupin	
2007	American Pie Presents: Beta House	Harry Stifler	Direct-to-video
2008	Mad Money	Bryce Arbogast	
2008	Superhero Movie	Lou Landers / Hourglass	
2008	Summerhood	Assistant Director	
2008	Player 5150	Tony	
2008	The House Bunny	Dean Simmons	
2008	An American Carol	Lab Supervisor	
2009	Fanboys	Chuck "Big Chuck"	
2009	Spooner	Dennis Spooner	
2009	Reunion	Eamon	
2009	Deep in the Valley	Jim "Diamond Jim"	
2009	Splinterheads	Sergeant Bruce Mancuso	
2009	Middle Men	George Harris	
2010	Black Widow	Steve	
2010	Barry Munday	Dr. Preston Edwards	
2010	The Best and the Brightest	The Player	
2010	Ultraman Zero: The Revenge of Belial	Mirrior Knight	Voice (2012 English dub)
2011	Adventures of Serial Buddies	Father Christopher	
2011	Cat Run	Bill Kreb	
2012	The Collection	Mr. Peters	
2012	Not Fade Away	Jack Dietz	
2012	Grassroots	Jim Tripp	
2014	About Last Night	Casey McNeil	
2014	Believe Me	Ken	
2015	Don't Worry Baby	Harry Lang	
2015	The Squeeze	"Riverboat"	
2015	Zipper	Peter Kirkland	
2016	Exposed	Lieutenant Galway	
2017	The Crash	Del Banco	
2017	Once Upon a Time in Venice	Mr. Carter	
2017	Wetlands	Detective Paddy "Red" Sheehan	
2018	Deep Murder	Richard Dangler	
2018	Backtrace	Franks	Direct-to-video
2020	The Stand at Paxton County	Sheriff Roger Bostwick	
2020	We Can Be Heroes	President Neil Anami	
2021	Land of Dreams	Blair	
2021	Walking with Herb	Wiley Saunders	
2022	Rosaline	Lord Capulet	
2023	Abruptio	Police Chief Richter	
2024	Beverly Hills Cop: Axel F	Golfer	
2025	The Last Rodeo	Jimmy Mack	
2025	Happy Gilmore 2	Shooter McGavin	
2025	Swiped	Robert	
2026	Jimmy	Lionel Barrymore	

=== Television ===
Year	Title	Role	Notes
1978	Getting Married	Usher	Television film
1981	Insight	Jeff Curry	Episode: "A Step Too Slow"
1982	Cheers	Rick Walker	Episode: "Endless Slumper"
1983	Lottery!	Peter	Episode: "Being a Winner"
1984	Call to Glory	Tim O'Reilly	2 episodes
1984–1986	Riptide	Dennis, Johnny	2 episodes
1985	Hunter	Sonny Dupree	Episode: "The Garbage Man"
1985	Knight Rider	Joe Flynn	Episode: "Ten Wheel Trouble"
1985	It's a Living	Alexi	Episode: "From Russia with Love"
1986	1st & Ten	Detective	Episode: "California Freeze Out"
1986	The Twilight Zone	Delivery Man	Episode: "Aqua Vita"
1986–1989	Matlock	Eric Lane, David Channing	3 episodes
1987	The Wizard	Paige	Episode: "The Heart of a Dancer"
1987	Our House	Mr. Tollfeson	Episode: "The Best Intentions"
1987	Eight Is Enough: A Family Reunion	Jeb	Television film
1988	The Highwayman	Joshua Towler	Episode: "Billionaire Body Club"
1988	Little Girl Lost	Wolff	Television film
1989	Paradise	Dexter	2 episodes
1989	An Eight Is Enough Wedding	Jeb	Television film
1990	Star Trek: The Next Generation	Lieutenant Richard Castillo	Episode: "Yesterday's Enterprise"
1990–1991	Empty Nest	Nick Todd	3 episodes
1991–1992	Walter & Emily	Matt Collins	13 episodes
1992	Home Improvement	Stu Cutler	Episode: "For Whom The Belch Tolls"
1993–1994	Good Advice	Joey DeRuzza	Series regular
1994	Another Midnight Run	Jack Walsh	Television film
1994	Midnight Runaround	Jack Walsh	Television film
1994	Midnight Run for Your Life	Jack Walsh	Television film
1995	The Tuskegee Airmen	Major Sherman Joy	Television film
1996	Superman: The Animated Series	Jor-El	Voice, 3 episodes
1997	Gun	Lutz	Episode: "Ricochet"
1997	Into Thin Air: Death on Everest	Jon Krakauer	Television film
1997–1999	Veronica's Closet	Bryce Anderson	9 episodes
1999–2002	Family Law	Rex Weller	68 episodes
2000	Batman Beyond	Superman	Voice, episode: "The Call"
2001	61*	Mel Allen	Television film
2002	Total Access 24/7: Spy Kids 2	Himself	1 episode
2002	The Twilight Zone	Rick	Episode: "Mr. Motivation"
2003	Without a Trace	Bob Carroll	Episodes: "The Bus"
2004	Justice League Unlimited	Jor-El	Voice, episode: "For the Man Who Has Everything"
2004	North Shore	Walter Booth	6 episodes
2004–2006	Cracking Up	Ted Shackleton	8 episodes
2004–2007	Kim Possible	Hego	Voice, 3 episodes
2005	Fat Actress	Jimmy	Episode: "Crack for Good"
2006	Twins	Terry	Episode: "Blast from the Past"
2006	Las Vegas	Kidnapper Chips	2 episodes
2006–2011	Law & Order: Criminal Intent	Evan Corman, Declan Pace	2 episodes
2007	The Dukes of Hazzard: The Beginning	Jefferson Davis "Boss" Hogg	Television film
2007	Medium	Gregory King	Episode: "1-900-Lucky"
2007	The Sopranos	Eddie Dunne	Episode: "Stage 5"
2007	The Bronx Is Burning	Joe DiMaggio	Miniseries
2008	Psych	Paul Haversham	Episode: "Ghosts"
2008	My Boys	George Newman	2 episodes
2009	Law & Order	John Jay McIntyre	Episode: "Illegitimate"
2009	Numbers	Frank Thompson	Episode: "Ultimatum"
2009–2010	Stargate Universe	Senator Alan Armstrong	3 episodes
2010–2012	Boardwalk Empire	Harry M. Daugherty	7 episodes
2010–2012	Ben 10: Ultimate Alien	Captain Nemesis	Voice, 2 episodes
2011	Lemonade Mouth	Principal Stanley Brenigan	Television film
2011–2012	Harry's Law	Tommy Jefferson	32 episodes
2012	Kung Fu Panda: Legends of Awesomeness	Undertaker	Voice, episode: "The Po Who Cried Ghost"
2012–2013	Happy Endings	Mr. Kerkovich	2 episodes
2013	Body of Proof	Gerry Roberts	Episode: "Disappearing Act"
2013–2014	Kirstie	Mr. Sheppard	3 episodes
2014	Beware the Batman	Harvey Dent	Voice, 8 episodes
2014	Ben 10: Omniverse	Captain Nemesis	Voice, episode: "The Vengers"
2014	Regular Show	Carl Putter	Voice, episode: "Daddy Issues"
2015	Texas Rising	Henry Karnes	5 episodes
2015	The League	Judge Raymond Hardy	Episode: "The Last Temptation of Andre"
2015–2016	The Good Wife	Judge Don Schakowsky	7 episodes
2016–2019	Ballers	Dallas Cowboys Owner	13 episodes
2017	Law & Order: Special Victims Unit	Harold Coyle	Episode: "The Newsroom"
2017	Great News	Len	Episode: "Award Show"
2017–2018	Gone	Pastor	2 episodes
2018	Superior Donuts	Ted	Episode: "The Chicago Way"
2018	Living Biblically	Ron Curry	Episode: "Honor Thy Father"
2018	Sideswiped	Mark	Episode: "Baby Steps"
2018	Rob Riggle's Ski Master Academy	Jim Bassman	Episode: "The Bassman Cometh"
2018–2020	The Real Bros of Simi Valley	Cal Surf	9 episodes
2019	Mr. Iglesias	Coach Dixon	9 episodes
2019	Costume Quest	Bob Dickerson	Voice, 9 episodes
2021	Search Party	Bill	2 episodes
2021	Impeachment: American Crime Story	Robert S. Bennett	2 episodes
2021–2026	Hacks	Marty Ghilain	18 episodes
2022	The Watcher	Detective Rourke Chamberland	7 episodes
2022	Last Week Tonight with John Oliver	Cal Taylor	Episode: "Trucks"
2023	Secret Invasion	Chris Stearns	2 episodes
2023	Captain Fall	Blake Fall	Voice, 3 episodes
2023–2024	Star Wars: Young Jedi Adventures	Grandpa Roog	Voice, 2 episodes
2026	The Gray House	Thomas McNiven	8 episodes
2026	The Miniature Wife	Jim McMichael	Episode: "Janet Reno"
2026	High Value Target: The Hunt for Saddam	Gabe Vardakas	1 episode

=== Theatre ===
Year	Title	Role	Venue	Ref.
2005–2006	Chicago	Billy Flynn	Broadway, Ambassador Theatre	
2013	Lucky Guy	Eddie Hayes	Broadway, Broadhurst Theatre	
2016–2017	The Front Page	Murphy	Broadway, Broadhurst Theatre	

=== Video games ===
Year	Title	Role	Notes
2010	Ben 10 Ultimate Alien: Cosmic Destruction	Captain Nemesis	
2025	PGA Tour 2K25	Himself	

=== Music videos ===
Year	Title	Artist
2002	"The Barry Williams Show"	Peter Gabriel
2023	"Honky Tonkin' About"	The Reklaws (featuring Drake Milligan)

== Awards and nominations ==
Year	Award	Category	Work	Result	Ref.
2021	New York True Venture Film Festival	Best Actor	Being American	Won	
2022	Primetime Emmy Awards	Outstanding Guest Actor in a Comedy Series	Hacks	Nominated	
2022	Actor Awards	Outstanding Performance by an Ensemble in a Comedy Series	Hacks	Nominated	
2022	Online Film and Television Association	Best Guest Actor in a Comedy Series	Hacks	Nominated	
2024	Astra TV Awards	Best Guest Actor in a Comedy Series	Hacks	Nominated	
2025	Astra TV Awards	Best Guest Actor in a Comedy Series	Hacks	Nominated	
2026	Primetime Emmy Awards	Outstanding Guest Actor in a Comedy Series	Hacks	Nominated	
