= Action Pack (TV programming block) =

Television series

- Network: various via syndication
- Launched: January 17, 1994
- Closed: 2001
- Country of origin: United States
- Owner: MCA (1994–1996); Seagram (1996–2000); Vivendi Universal (2000–2001)
- Sister network: Universal Family Network
- Running time: 2 hours

Action Pack, also called Universal Action Pack, was a syndicated programming block series of television movies and television series created by Universal Television that aired from 1994 until 2001. The Action Pack included two hours of various television series produced by Renaissance Pictures and distributed by MCA TV (later known as Universal Television Enterprises and Studios USA Television Distribution).

== Background ==
Previously, there were three attempts by MCA TV/Universal Television to launch some sort of organized independent programming. First, MCA TV launched the ad hoc movie Universal Pictures Debut Network in 1985. With Premier Program Service, MCA TV teamed up with Paramount for this planned network by October 1989, which was abandoned in February 1990. The last was a two night three-series Hollywood Premiere Network in 1990–91.

== History ==
In 1994, the Action Pack initially ran as a wheel series of television movies, which were all effectively pilots; if successful, they would become TV series the following season. The initial plan was for six franchises to each have four movies for the block, including TekWar, Smokey and the Bandit, Midnight Run, Hercules: The Legendary Journeys, Vanishing Son and the working title Fastlane when offered at programming executive conference in January 1994.

On January 17 and 18, 1994, a dozen stations showed TekWar, the premiere TV movie of the programming block. The stations' ratings increased greatly with a 350% increase in KOFY in San Francisco. MCA cut Rob Cohen's Midnight Run to three films, so that star Christopher McDonald could star in a feature film. Cohen produced Knight Rider 2010 as a replacement. The block aired its first season until January 1995 and lost $30 million. TekWar was picked up as a regular TV series for the USA Network instead of Action Pack, starting in January 1995.

From January to June 1995, the block included Hercules: The Legendary Journeys and Vanishing Son. The Hercules series became a surprise hit as the third most-watched first-run syndicated action hour. From September 1995 through January 2000, Action Pack included Hercules: The Legendary Journeys and its spinoff, Xena: Warrior Princess. A year after Hercules ended its run, the Universal Action Pack launched the Back2Back Action Hour consisting of two thirty-minute series: Jack of All Trades and Cleopatra 2525 to air alongside Xena. The lineup lasted until second quarter 2001. Jack of All Trades and Xena were canceled and Cleopatra 2525 was increased to an hour-long show in January 2001.

After Xena, the most successful series on the Action Pack, completed airing its final season's reruns in the summer of 2001, Cleopatra 2525 also stopped production and the Action Pack block was discontinued.

== Television series and movies ==
The television series and movies aired during the Action Pack's first year included:

Hercules films:

- Hercules and the Amazon Women
- Hercules and the Lost Kingdom
- Hercules and the Circle of Fire
- Hercules in the Underworld
- Hercules in the Maze of the Minotaur

TekWar (Based on the books by William Shatner):

- Tekwar
- TekLords
- Teklab
- TekJustice, an original story

The Midnight Run Action Pack, Midnight Run films (sequels to the 1988 film of the same name):

- Another Midnight Run
- Midnight Runaround
- Midnight Run for Your Life

Bandit TV series (standalone sequel to Smokey and the Bandit Part 3):

- Episode 1 - Bandit Goes Country
- Episode 2 - Bandit Bandit
- Episode 3 - Beauty and the Bandit
- Episode 4 - Bandit's Silver Angel

Vanishing Son films:

- Vanishing Son I
- Vanishing Son II
- Vanishing Son III
- Vanishing Son IV

Starting as a series of four made-for-television movies in 1994, the series debuted on January 16, 1995. Vanishing Son I, Vanishing Son II, Vanishing Son III, and Vanishing Son IV, were aired on February 28, July 18, July 25, and October 10, 1994, respectively. The series was groundbreaking for the casting of an Asian male in an attractive leading-man role.

An additional movie was a part of the initial lineup; titled Fastlane, it was set to be directed by John Landis and would concern two friends finding a spaceship/car hybrid vehicle. However, for unknown reasons the project never actually made it to air. The "shell" prop for the spaceship/car (which was designed to fit over a Pontiac Fiero) was auctioned off in 2007.

- Knight Rider 2010 (1994)
- The Adventures of Captain Zoom in Outer Space (December 9, 1995)
- Beastmaster III: The Eye of Braxus (May 24, 1996)
- Atlantis: The Lost Continent, first shown on a Starz/Encore network channel in March 1997 before being run on Action Pack as a pilot TV film in August 1997. When it finally aired it was known as Escape from Atlantis.

== Series ==
- Bandit
- Hercules: The Legendary Journeys
- Vanishing Son
- Xena: Warrior Princess
- Back2Back Action Hour
  - Jack of All Trades
  - Cleopatra 2525

== Theme song ==
The theme song is used in the Action Pack opening sequence, sponsorships, as well as the full version of the theme used in promos for the TV series and movies. The theme was composed by Velton Ray Bunch.

== Carrying stations ==
- KTLA, Los Angeles, CA
- KLRT, Little Rock, AR
- KOFY, San Francisco, CA
- WPIX, New York, NY
- WPXT-TV, Portland, ME
- WSBK, WLVI, Boston, MA
- KPLR, St. Louis, MO
- WBZL, Miami, FL
- KDFW, KTXA, KDFI, KDAF, Dallas, TX
- KHWB Houston, TX
- WGN, Chicago, IL
- KWBP, Portland, OR
- WCWB, Pittsburgh, PA
- WATL, WGNX, WUPA, Atlanta, GA
- WDCA-20, WDCW, Washington, DC
- WFLX, West Palm Beach, FL
- KYES, Anchorage, AK
- KHON, Honolulu, HI
- WJWB, Jacksonville, FL
- WNUV, WBFF, Baltimore, MD
- WFLI, Chattanooga, TN
- WFVT, Rock Hill, SC / Charlotte, NC
- WLMT-TV, Memphis, TN
- WPSG, WPHL, Philadelphia, PA
- WFTC, Minneapolis/St. Paul, MN
- WKBD, WDWB, Detroit, MI
- WKCF, WOFL, Orlando, FL
- WTVT, WTSP, Tampa, FL
- KUTP, Phoenix, AZ
- WUAB, Cleveland, OH
- WSTR, Cincinnati, OH
- WPMT, WLYH, Harrisburg, PA
- WYZZ, Peoria, IL
- WVTV, Milwaukee, WI
- WAAY, WZDX, Huntsville, AL
- WTIC, Hartford, CT
- WUXP, WZTV, Nashville, TN
- KIRO, KSTW, Seattle, WA
- KCYU, Yakima, WA
- KREM, Spokane, WA
- WGNT, Norfolk, VA
- WRBL, Columbus, GA
- WFXL, Albany, GA
- WKPT, Johnson City, TN
- WTNZ, Knoxville, TN
- WCJB, Gainesville, FL
- KOCB, Oklahoma City, OK
- WNKY, Bowling Green, KY
- KDSM, Des Moines, IA
- WJBF, Augusta, GA
- KAAL, Rochester, MN
- WTVQ, WDKY, Lexington, KY
- KOAT, Albuquerque, NM
- WEYB, WPDE, Florence, SC
- WACH, Columbia, SC
- KWGN, Denver, CO
- KCIT, Amarillo, TX
- KSMO, Kansas City, MO
