= One Beer Away =

2024 single by the Reklaws

Single by The Reklaws
- Released: June 28, 2024
- Genre: Country; country pop
- Length: 3:38
- Label: Starseed
- Songwriters: Stuart Walker; Jenna Walker; Scott Helman; Callum Maudsley
- Producer: Callum Maudsley

The Reklaws singles chronology
"I Grew Up on a Farm" (2024)	"One Beer Away" (2024)	"Never Drinking Again" (2025)

Visualizer
- "One Beer Away" on YouTube

Alternate cover

"One Beer Away" is a song recorded by Canadian country music duo The Reklaws. Stuart Walker and Jenna Walker of the duo wrote the song with Scott Helman and Callum Maudsley, while Maudsley produced the track.

== Background and release ==
Stuart Walker of the Reklaws remarked that the sibling duo was releasing "some different music" than fans were used to in 2024, so with "One Beer Away", they wished to release a "true Reklaws song". Jenna Walker compared the song to the duo's past single "Long Live the Night", hoping that it "[captures] the essence of the perfect summer night in your small town". The song was initially released in June 2024, before being released again as the title track of a three-pack single with the songs "If I Drink Enough" and "All the Time".

== Critical reception ==
Chad Carlson of Today's Country Magazine referred to the track as a "a summer anthem that is worthy of unprecedented airplay and fandom," adding that the duo "[explores] new realms of the country genre while incorporating those trademark elements that fans have always loved about them over the years". Nanci Dagg of Canadian Beats Media stated that the song had a "catchy chorus" and "upbeat tempo". Hank Rivers of Harmony Hay stated that the track "is much more than a song about having a beer", opining that it is "a testament to the resilience found in friendship, the healing power of a listening ear, and the freedom that comes from a moment of reprieve, encapsulated in the act of sharing a beer and a good time".

== Live performances ==
The Reklaws appeared on Citytv's Breakfast Television to perform "One Beer Away" live shortly after the song's release.

== Music video ==
The official visualizer for "One Beer Away" was directed by Austin Chaffe and premiered on YouTube on June 28, 2024.

== Track listings ==
Digital download – single

1. "One Beer Away" – 3:38

Digital download – single

1. "One Beer Away" – 3:38
2. "If I Drink Enough" – 2:51
3. "All the Time" – 3:35

== Charts ==
Chart performance for "One Beer Away"
Chart (2024)	Peak position
Australia Country Hot 50 (The Music)	20
Canada (Canadian Hot 100)	96
Canada Country (Mediabase)	5

== Certifications ==
Region	Certification	Certified units/sales
Canada (Music Canada)	Gold	40,000^{‡}
^{‡} Sales+streaming figures based on certification alone.
