= Another Midnight Run =

- Genre: Action; Comedy
- Based on: Characters by George Gallo
- Written by: Eric Freiser
- Directed by: James Frawley
- Starring: Christopher McDonald; Cathy Moriarty; Jeffrey Tambor; Ed O'Ross; Dan Hedaya; John Fleck; Sam Shamshack
- Music by: David Bergeaud
- Country of origin: United States
- Original language: English

Production
- Executive producers: Michael Duggan; George Gallo
- Producers: Tony To; Ellen Fontana (as Ellen Erwin); Larry Manetti; John P. Melfi
- Production locations: 2nd Street Tunnel between Hill and Figueroa, Los Angeles, California; Los Angeles City Hall; Sperry, Oklahoma
- Cinematography: Robert Draper
- Editors: Chip Masamitsu; Tim Tommasino
- Running time: 92 minutes
- Production company: Universal Television

Original release
- Release: February 6, 1994

Related
- Midnight Runaround

Another Midnight Run is a 1994 American made-for-television film, and the first in a series of television films produced for Universal Television's Action Pack programming block and based on the 1988 feature film Midnight Run. Christopher McDonald plays bounty hunter Jack Walsh, who was portrayed by Robert De Niro in the first film. Another Midnight Run was followed by two more made-for-television sequels, Midnight Runaround and Midnight Run for Your Life.

== Plot summary ==
Jack Walsh (McDonald) is hired by bail bondsman Eddie Moscone (Dan Hedaya) to bring in Bernie Abbot (Jeffrey Tambor) and Helen Bishop (Cathy Moriarty), a husband and wife team of con artists. Moscone also brings in rival bounty hunter Marvin Dorfler (Ed O'Ross) to work with Jack, with the agreement that they will split the money; however, both men are planning to double cross each other.

== Cast and characters ==
- Christopher McDonald as Jack Walsh
- Jeffrey Tambor as Bernie Abbot
- Cathy Moriarty as Helen Bishop
- Ed O'Ross as Marvin Dorfler
- John Fleck as Jerry Geisler
- Dan Hedaya as Eddie Moscone
- Sam Shamshak as Lester Weems

== Alternate titles ==
- Midnight Run 2: Another Midnight Run (UK)
- Midnight Run: Cash Comes at Midnight (Germany)
