= Where I'm From (The Reklaws song) =

2020 single by the Reklaws

Single by the Reklaws

from the album Sophomore Slump
- Released: April 17, 2020
- Genre: Country
- Length: 3:31 (single); 16:40 (EP)
- Label: Universal Canada
- Songwriter(s): Stuart Walker; Jenna Walker; Todd Clark; Gavin Slate; Travis Wood
- Producer(s): Todd Clark

The Reklaws singles chronology
"Can't Help Myself" (2020)	"Where I'm From" (2020)	"Not Gonna Not" (2020)

Music video
- "Where I'm From" on YouTube

"Where I'm From" is a song co-written and recorded by Canadian country duo the Reklaws. The duo wrote the track with Gavin Slate, Travis Wood, and the track's producer Todd Clark. The song was released on a five-track EP of the same name, and became the lead single off the Reklaws' second studio album Sophomore Slump.

== Background ==
The Reklaws stated: "'Where I'm From' reminds us of our childhood where the majority of our time was spent at home, with family and neighbours who were our closest friends in our hometown which felt like the whole world." Released amidst the coronavirus pandemic in 2020, Jenna Walker stated, "I think this song will bring some brightness and light to everybody and remind them that this doesn’t have to be a fully negative time."

== Critical reception ==
Katie Colley of ET Canada referred to the song as a "nostalgic new track" and a "reminder to reconnect with loved ones and appreciate the little things, now more than ever". Chris Parton of Sounds Like Nashville said the track is "filled with sunset-country sonics and the blood-harmony blend of voices raised under one roof in Cambridge, Ontario" and that "the heartwarming track will make you want to call up your family and reminisce". Allen Steinberg of Canadian Beats Media called the song a "touching duet".

== Commercial performance ==
"Where I'm From" was certified Platinum by Music Canada on November 16, 2020, with over 80,000 sales. It reached a peak of #2 on the Billboard Canada Country chart dated September 5, 2020, It also peaked at #73 on the Canadian Hot 100, becoming their highest charting solo entry to date.

== Music video ==
The official music video for "Where I'm From" premiered on May 8, 2020 and was directed by Ben Knechtel. The video is a combination of old family photos and home videos that show their journey from their childhood on their family farm to performing at large venues.

== Track listings ==
Digital download - single

1. "Where I'm From" – 3:31

Digital download - single

1. "Where I'm From" – 3:31
2. "Where I'm From" – 3:27
  (acoustic)

Digital download - Deluxe EP

1. "Where I'm From" – 3:31
2. "Beer Can" – 2:56
3. "Karma" – 3:19
4. "Godspeed" – 3:21
5. "Where I'm From" – 3:27
  (acoustic)

== Charts ==
Chart (2020)	Peak position
Canada (Canadian Hot 100)	73
Canada Country (Billboard)	2

== Certifications ==
Region	Certification	Certified units/sales
Canada (Music Canada)	Platinum	80,000^{‡}
^{‡} Sales+streaming figures based on certification alone.
