= Hometown Kids =

2017 song by the Reklaws

Single by The Reklaws

from the album Freshman Year
- Released: June 16, 2017
- Genre: Country pop
- Length: 3:09
- Label: Universal Canada
- Songwriter(s): Jenna Walker; Stuart Walker; Gavin Slate; Travis Wood
- Producer(s): Todd Clark

The Reklaws singles chronology
"Hometown Kids" (2017)	"Long Live the Night" (2018)

Music video
- "Hometown Kids" on YouTube

"Hometown Kids" is a song co-written and recorded by Canadian country duo The Reklaws. The duo wrote the song with Gavin Slate and Travis Wood. It was the debut and lead single off their debut studio album Freshman Year.

== Background ==
Stuart Walker told The Boot that the sibling duo "wanted everybody to understand that we are just college kids at heart". It was the first song they wrote with prolific Canadian country songwriters Gavin Slate and Travis Wood. Jenna Walker said the song is "important to us because it was our first major, like, [time to] sit down [and] really configure who we are as artists and what we want to say".

== Critical reception ==
Jenna Melanson of Canadian Beats Media called the song the "perfect summer anthem". Mary Ayers of Teenplicity referred to the track as a "joyful country jam" that "creates a yearning for fun summer nights with friends". Canadian Prime Minister Justin Trudeau added the song to his personal Spotify playlist.

== Music video ==
The official music video for "Hometown Kids" premiered on August 17, 2017. It features Jenna Walker and Stuart Walker of the Reklaws, as well as forty of their closest friends. The video was filmed in their hometown of Cambridge, Ontario and directed by Ben Knechtel.

== Credits and personnel ==
Credits adapted from Freshman Year CD booklet.

- Todd Clark — production, engineering, programming, backing vocals
- Anthony Lucido — bass guitar
- Andrew Mendelson — mastering
- Justin Niebank — mixing
- Gavin Slate — banjo, programming, backing vocals, production, engineering
- Jenna Walker — lead vocals
- Stuart Walker — lead vocals
- Derek Wells — guitar, mandolin
- Travis Wood — backing vocals

== Chart performance ==
"Hometown Kids" reached a peak of #16 on the Billboard Canada Country chart for the week of December 9, 2017.

Chart (2017)	Peak position
Canada Country (Billboard)	16

== Certifications ==
Region	Certification	Certified units/sales
Canada (Music Canada)	Gold	40,000^{‡}
^{‡} Sales+streaming figures based on certification alone.
