= Not Gonna Not =

2020 single by the Reklaws

Single by the Reklaws

from the album Sophomore Slump
- Released: October 16, 2020
- Genre: Country
- Length: 3:26
- Label: Universal Canada
- Songwriter(s): Jenna Walker; Stuart Walker; Todd Clark; Gavin Slate; Travis Wood
- Producer(s): Todd Clark

The Reklaws singles chronology
| "Where I'm From" (2020) | "Not Gonna Not" (2020) | "Somewhere to Drink" (2021) |

Music video
- "Not Gonna Not" on YouTube

"Not Gonna Not" is a song co-written and recorded by Canadian country music duo the Reklaws. The duo wrote the song with Gavin Slate, Travis Wood, and producer Todd Clark. It was the second single off their second studio album Sophomore Slump.

== Music video ==
The official music video for "Not Gonna Not" was directed by Ben Knechtel and premiered on October 16, 2020, the same day the Sophomore Slump album was released. The video was filmed in the duo's hometown of Cambridge, Ontario.

== Chart performance ==
"Not Gonna Not" reached a peak of number 5 on the Billboard Canada Country chart dated February 27, 2021. It also peaked at #74 on Canadian Hot 100 in the same week.

| Chart (2021) | Peak position |
|---|---|
| Canada (Canadian Hot 100) | 74 |
| Canada Country (Billboard) | 5 |

== Certifications ==
| Region | Certification | Certified units/sales |
|---|---|---|
| Canada (Music Canada) | Gold | 40,000^{‡} |
^{‡} Sales+streaming figures based on certification alone.
