= 11 Beers =

2022 single by the Reklaws and Jake Owen

Single by The Reklaws with Jake Owen

from the album Good Ol' Days
- Released: March 11, 2022
- Genre: Country
- Length: 3:24
- Label: Starseed; Big Loud
- Songwriter(s): Ashley Gorley; Michael Hardy; Hunter Phelps; Ben Johnson
- Producer(s): Todd Clark

The Reklaws singles chronology
"Somewhere to Drink" (2021)	"11 Beers" (2022)	"Good Ol' Days" (2023)

Jake Owen singles chronology
"Best Thing Since Backroads" (2021)	"11 Beers" (2022)	"Up There Down Here" (2022)

Lyric Video
- "11 Beers" on YouTube

"11 Beers" is a song by Canadian country duo The Reklaws with American country artist Jake Owen. The track was written by Michael Hardy, Ashley Gorley, Hunter Phelps, and Ben Johnson, and produced by Todd Clark. It was the lead single off the Reklaws' third studio album Good Ol' Days.

== Background ==
The Reklaws first met Jake Owen at the Boots and Hearts Music Festival in 2016, when Owen was a headlining act set to be introduced by the then-upcoming Reklaws. They initially watched Owen drive up backstage with the Volkswagen bus from the cover of his album American Love, before he introduced himself to the sibling duo. Stuart Walker of the Reklaws stated that Owen's authenticity off the stage along with the "vibes" from his performance were inspiration for how he wanted the Reklaws to build their image as country artists. Years later, the two artists were looking to record a song together and sent demos to each other back and forth for approximately eight months. Owen sent "11 Beers" to the Reklaws, and Stuart Walker stated he initially was scared of the title as the duo has already recorded several drinking songs, including their hit "Can't Help Myself". They were nonetheless intrigued as the song was written by several well-known Nashville writers including Hardy, a fellow country artist who sang the vocals for the demo of the song. They were instant fans of the track upon listening to it and recognizing its theme of reminiscing about a summer love between two people. Jenna Walker of the Reklaws described the song as the "first of many to come" in the "next level" of the duo's music, adding that the duo knows their fans "are going to relate to this track because we’ve all lived through losing something before we felt it was finished".

== Critical reception ==
Chris Parton of Sounds Like Nashville compared the song to "a buzz worth chasing again and again", adding that it "has a golden mix of romantic perfection and what-if desire, and a refreshing groove that goes down easy. Nanci Dagg of Canadian Beats Media described the song as an "'80s inspired pop medley that is also a hopeful love song and will surely turn into country's next party anthem where one can't help but dance along", adding that it "transports listeners back to the dreamy elation after a great first date and then watching it disappear right before your eyes before the last drink". Bill King of FYI Music News said that "11 Beers" is "slated to become yet another massive hit" for the Reklaws. The Country Note called the song "an anthem full of potential".

== Accolades ==
Year	Association	Category	Result	Ref
2023	Canadian Country Music Association	Musical Collaboration of the Year	Nominated	
2023	Canadian Country Music Association	Single of the Year	Nominated	

== Commercial performance ==
"11 Beers" reached a peak of number one on the Billboard Canada Country chart dated July 23, 2022, marking the Reklaws' third career chart-topper, and Owen's seventh number one in Canada. It also peaked at number 56 on the Canadian Hot 100 for the week prior. The song has been certified Platinum by Music Canada.

== Charts ==
Chart performance for "11 Beers"
Chart (2022)	Peak position
Canada (Canadian Hot 100)	56
Canada Country (Billboard)	1

== Certifications ==
Region	Certification	Certified units/sales
Canada (Music Canada)	Platinum	80,000^{‡}
^{‡} Sales+streaming figures based on certification alone.
