= Sophomore Slump (album) =

Studio album by the Reklaws
- Released: October 16, 2020
- Genre: Country; country pop
- Length: 36:21
- Label: Universal Music Canada
- Producer: Todd Clark; Gavin Slate

The Reklaws chronology
Freshman Year (2019)	Sophomore Slump (2020)	Good Ol' Days (2022)

Singles from Sophomore Slump
- 1. "Where I'm From" Released: April 17, 2020; 2. "Not Gonna Not" Released: October 16, 2020

Sophomore Slump is the second album by Canadian country music duo the Reklaws. It was released on October 16, 2020, via Universal Music Canada. It includes their No. 2 hit "Where I'm From", as well as the No. 5 hit "Not Gonna Not". The album was supported by a virtual tour in the Fall of 2020.

== Track listing ==
No.	Title	Writer(s)	Length
1.	"Gramps' Intro"	Jenna Walker; Stuart Walker; Callum Maudsley	0:35
2.	"Not Gonna Not"	Walker; Walker; Todd Clark; Gavin Slate; Travis Wood	3:26
3.	"Got Me Missing"	Walker; Walker; Brad Rempel; Ben Stennis	2:52
4.	"You Problem"	Walker; Walker; Clark; Wood; Donovan Woods	2:51
5.	"I'm Down"	Walker; Walker; Clark; Slate; Wood	3:17
6.	"So Crazy It Just Might Work"	Walker; Walker; Thomas Salter; Gordie Sampson	3:01
7.	"Your Side of a Broken Heart"	Walker; Walker; Rempel; Stennis	3:35
8.	"Where I'm From"	Walker; Walker; Clark; Slate; Wood	3:31
9.	"Karma"	Walker; Walker; Eric Gunderson; Stephen Barker	3:22
10.	"Beer Can"	Walker; Walker; Clark; Slate; Wood	2:58
11.	"Godspeed"	Walker; Walker; Alex Kline; Allison Veltz	3:22
12.	"Where I'm From" (acoustic)	Walker; Walker; Clark; Slate; Wood	3:27
Total length:			36:21

== Charts ==
=== Singles ===
Year	Single	Peak chart positions		Certifications
Year	Single	CAN Country	CAN	Certifications
2020	"Where I'm From"	2	73	MC: Platinum
2020	"Not Gonna Not"	5	74	MC: Gold

== Awards and nominations ==
Year	Association	Category	Nominated Work	Result	Ref.
2022	Juno Awards	Country Album of the Year	Sophomore Slump	Nominated	

== Release history ==
Release formats for Sophomore Slump
Country	Date	Format	Label	Ref.
Various	October 16, 2020	Digital download	Universal Music Canada	
Various	October 16, 2020	Streaming	Universal Music Canada	
Various	November 27, 2020	Compact disc	Universal Music Canada	
Various	March 6, 2021	Vinyl	Universal Music Canada	
