= Never Drinking Again =

2025 single by the Reklaws

Single by The Reklaws
- Released: May 23, 2025
- Genre: Country pop
- Length: 2:29
- Label: Starseed
- Songwriters: Jenna Walker; Stuart Walker; Gabriella Scotto; Jack Schrepferman
- Producers: Callum Maudsley; Jack Schrepferman

The Reklaws singles chronology
"One Beer Away" (2024)	"Never Drinking Again" (2025)

Video Visualizer
- "Never Drinking Again" on YouTube

"Never Drinking Again" is a song recorded by Canadian country duo The Reklaws. The sibling duo wrote the song with Gabriella Scotto and Jack Schrepferman, while Schrepferman produced the track with Callum Maudsley. The song marked the duo's twelfth career top ten hit on the Canada Country chart.

== Background ==
In a press release, Jenna Walker of the Reklaws stated that the duo was "ready to get back to ourselves, to reminding people that no matter what life throws at you, good times will always come" and that was what they set out to say with the release of "Never Drinking Again". The duo released the song "We're Back Baby" several weeks prior, and Stuart Walker remarked that they wanted to "dedicate a summer to having more fun than ever before" with the songs.

== Critical reception ==
Aileen Goos of Atwood Magazine referred to "Never Drinking Again" as a "cheeky, catchy anthem" that "captures The Reklaws' trademark charm and party spirit" and is "perfect for summer nights, kitchen dance floors, and volume-all-the-way-up car rides." An uncredited article from Complete Country opined that the song "feels true to the songs that made [the Reklaws] a household name across the nation."

== Music video ==
The official visualizer video for "Never Drinking Again" was directed by Austin Chaffe and premiered on YouTube on May 23, 2025.

== Charts ==
Chart performance for "Never Drinking Again"
Chart (2025)	Peak position
Canada (Canadian Hot 100)	97
Canada Country (Billboard)	5
