= I Grew Up on a Farm =

2024 single by the Reklaws

Single by The Reklaws
- Released: February 2, 2024
- Genre: Country
- Length: 3:11
- Label: Starseed
- Songwriters: Stuart Walker; Jenna Walker; Scott Helman; Callum Maudsley; Emily Reid; Khal Yassein
- Producer: Callum Maudsley

The Reklaws singles chronology
"Honky Tonkin' About" (2023)	"I Grew Up on a Farm" (2024)	"One Beer Away" (2024)

Visualizer
- "I Grew Up on a Farm" on YouTube

"I Grew Up on a Farm" is a song recorded by Canadian country music duo The Reklaws. Stuart Walker and Jenna Walker of the duo wrote the song with Scott Helman, Emily Reid, Khal Yassein, and Callum Maudsley, while Maudsley produced the track.

== Background ==
The Reklaws described their co-writing process with the other writers of "I Grew Up on a Farm" as a "reunion" with a "close-knit group of friends who have been a constant in their lives over the years". The sibling duo grew up on their family's "Yee Haw Adventure Farm," and Stuart Walker remarked that the song was a "tribute to the simple joys and lessons learned there, as well as the pride we have of that upbringing". Jenna Walker describe the song's release as "moving into the next season of our story while at the same time reminding ourselves why we started making music in the first place", adding that the duo has "a newfound confidence to share our story after our journey these past few years".

== Critical reception ==
Lily Braendle of Front Porch Music described the song as a "catchy tune", noting that the "lyrics do a great job at painting a picture of the simple joys and special moments of country living". An uncredited author from RFD-TV called the song a "a powerful anthem that captures the authenticity of [the duo's] rural roots".

== Accolades ==
Year	Association	Category	Result	Ref
2025	Canadian Country Music Association	Single of the Year	Nominated	

== Music video ==
The official visualizer for "I Grew Up on a Farm" was directed by Austin Chaffe and premiered on YouTube on March 21, 2024.

== Charts ==
"I Grew Up on a Farm" reached a peak position of number five on the Billboard Canada Country chart for the week dated June 29, 2024, in its nineteenth week on the chart. This marked the Reklaws' tenth career top ten hit.

Chart performance for "I Grew Up on a Farm"
Chart (2024)	Peak position
Canada Country (Billboard)	5

== Certifications ==
Region	Certification	Certified units/sales
Canada (Music Canada)	Gold	40,000^{‡}
^{‡} Sales+streaming figures based on certification alone.
