= Best Thing Since Backroads =

2021 single by Jake Owen

Single by Jake Owen
- Released: August 6, 2021
- Genre: Country rock
- Length: 3:07
- Label: Big Loud
- Songwriters: Ben Johnson; Geoff Warburton; Hunter Phelps; Spencer Saylor; Jordan Minton
- Producer: Joey Moi

Jake Owen singles chronology
"Made for You" (2020)	"Best Thing Since Backroads" (2021)	"11 Beers" (2022)

Music video
- "Best Thing Since Backroads" on YouTube

"Best Thing Since Backroads" is a song by American country music singer Jake Owen. It was released on August 6, 2021. The song was written by Ben Johnson, Geoff Warburton, Hunter Phelps, Spencer Saylor and Jordan Minton, and produced by Joey Moi.

== Background and content ==
Shelby Scott of Outsider wrote that the song describes "the subject’s long time spent traveling his town’s back roads." Carena Liptak of ABC Audio said it [is] "about the breezy, simple pleasure of driving two-lane highways — and the equally euphoric feeling of finding true love." In a press release, Owen stated: "It's always exciting releasing new music. It feels great being back out on the road and bringing happiness to people."

== Critical reception ==
Billy Dukes of Taste of Country felt that fans listening to "Best Thing Since Backroads" "may recall songs from the previous decade. Familiar scenes of lovemaking by the riverbank and dirt road drives with a cooler in the back dotted many of Moi's best arrangements in the early 2010s."

== Charts ==
=== Weekly charts ===
Weekly chart performance for "Best Thing Since Backroads"
Chart (2021–2022)	Peak position
Canada (Canadian Hot 100)	78
Canada Country (Billboard)	3
US Billboard Hot 100	72
US Country Airplay (Billboard)	2
US Hot Country Songs (Billboard)	17

=== Year-end charts ===
2022 year-end chart performance for "Best Thing Since Backroads"
Chart (2022)	Position
US Country Airplay (Billboard)	11
US Hot Country Songs (Billboard)	51
