= Freshman Year (album) =

Studio album by the Reklaws
- Released: August 27, 2019
- Studio: The Slam Factory (Toronto, Ontario)
- Genre: Country; country pop
- Length: 36:02
- Label: Universal Music Canada
- Producer: Todd Clark

The Reklaws chronology
Feels Like That (2018)	Freshman Year (2019)	Sophomore Slump (2020)

Singles from Freshman Year
- 1. "Hometown Kids" Released: June 16, 2017; 2. "Long Live the Night" Released: February 16, 2018; 3. "Feels Like That" Released: August 31, 2018; 4. "I Do Too" Released: March 27, 2019; 5. "Old Country Soul" Released: September 20, 2019

Freshman Year is the debut album of Canadian country music duo the Reklaws. It was released on August 27, 2019, via Universal Music Canada. It includes their #1 hit "Feels Like That", as well as the singles "Hometown Kids", "Long Live the Night", "I Do Too", and "Old Country Soul".

== Singles ==
"Hometown Kids" was released as their debut radio single in June 2017, and became their first charting entry on the Billboard Canada Country chart, peaking at #16. It has been certified Gold by Music Canada.

"Long Live the Night" was the second single to radio in February 2018. It peaked at #6 on Canadian country radio and has been certified double Platinum by Music Canada. The song was released as part of a three-track, digital single that included "Wish You Were Beer" and "Last Call". A modified version of the track was made for the Canadian Football League and used as the theme song for the national TV broadcast Thursday Night Football on CFL on TSN in 2018 and 2019.

"Feels Like That" was released as the third single to radio in August 2018. It became their first #1 on Canadian country radio and was certified Platinum by Music Canada. It was released as part of the seven-track EP, Feels Like That, that also included "Raised by the Radio" and "Missing You", as well as the three tracks from the Long Live the Night single and "Hometown Kids".

"I Do Too" was released as the fourth single to radio in March 2019. It peaked at #6 on the Canada Country chart, and became their first entry on the Canadian Hot 100, peaking at #98. It was certified Platinum by Music Canada.

"Old Country Soul" was released as the fifth single to radio off the album in September 2019. It peaked at #4 on the Canada Country chart and #87 on the Canadian Hot 100. It was certified Platinum by Music Canada.

== Track listing ==
No.	Title	Writer(s)	Length
1.	"Old Country Soul"	Jenna Walker; Stuart Walker; Dakota Jay; William King; Travis Wood	2:54
2.	"Summer of You"	S. Walker; Wood; Todd Clark; Gavin Slate	3:42
3.	"Long Live the Night"	S. Walker; Clark; Wood	3:24
4.	"Nobody's Perfect"	J. Walker; S. Walker; Clark; Wood	3:11
5.	"Feels Like That"	S. Walker; Clark; Wood; Donovan Woods	3:31
6.	"Raised by the Radio"	J. Walker; S. Walker; Slate; Wood	3:26
7.	"Missing You"	J. Walker; S. Walker; Slate; Wood	2:51
8.	"I Do Too"	J. Walker; S. Walker; Brad Rempel; Ben Stennis	3:20
9.	"Last Call"	J. Walker; S. Walker; Clark; Sarah Haze	2:56
10.	"Wish You Were Beer" (featuring James Barker Band)	J. Walker; S. Walker; Jay; King	3:48
11.	"Hometown Kids"	J. Walker; S. Walker; Slate; Wood	3:09
Total length:			36:02

== Charts ==
=== Album ===
Chart (2019)	Peak position
Canadian Albums (Billboard)	87

=== Singles ===
Year	Single	Peak chart positions		Certifications
Year	Single	CAN Country	CAN	Certifications
2017	"Hometown Kids"	16	—	MC: Gold
2018	"Long Live the Night"	6	— (Note: "Long Live the Night" did not enter the Canadian Hot 100, but peaked at number 25 on the Canadian Digital Song Sales component chart.)	MC: 2× Platinum
2018	"Feels Like That"	1	—	MC: Platinum
2019	"I Do Too"	6	98	MC: Platinum
2019	"Old Country Soul"	4	87	MC: Platinum

== Certifications ==
Region	Certification	Certified units/sales
Canada (Music Canada)	Gold	40,000^{‡}
^{‡} Sales+streaming figures based on certification alone.

== Release history ==
Release formats for Freshman Year
Country	Date	Format	Label	Ref.
Various	August 27, 2019	Digital download	Universal Music Canada	
Various	August 27, 2019	Streaming	Universal Music Canada	
Various	September 6, 2019	Compact disc	Universal Music Canada	
Various	December 20, 2019	Vinyl	Universal Music Canada	
