= Old Country Soul =

2019 single by the Reklaws

Single by The Reklaws

from the album Freshman Year
- Released: September 20, 2019
- Genre: Country
- Length: 2:54
- Label: Universal Canada
- Songwriter(s): Jenna Walker; Stuart Walker; Dakota Jay; William King; Travis Wood
- Producer(s): Todd Clark

The Reklaws singles chronology
"I Do Too" (2019)	"Old Country Soul" (2019)	"Can't Help Myself" (2020)

Music video
- "Old Country Soul" on YouTube

"Old Country Soul" is a song co-written and recorded by Canadian country duo The Reklaws. The song was co-written by the duo with Dakota Jay, William King, and Travis Wood. It was the fifth single off their debut studio album Freshman Year.

== Critical reception ==
Taryn McElheran of Canadian Beats Media highlighted the presence of both Walker siblings vocals adding that the song "mixes both new and old country sound creating a new and catchy tune".

== Commercial performance ==
"Old Country Soul" reached peaks of #4 on the Billboard Canada Country chart, and #87 on the Canadian Hot 100, both for the week of February 8, 2020. It was certified Platinum by Music Canada.

== Music video ==
The official music video for "Old Country Soul" premiered on September 12, 2019. It features both Jenna Walker and Stuart Walker of the Reklaws, and was directed by Ben Knechtel.

== Credits and personnel ==
Credits adapted from Freshman Year CD booklet.

- Todd Clark — production, engineering, programming, backing vocals, guitar, keyboard
- Matty Green — mixing
- Andrew Mendelson — mastering
- Justin Schipper — dobro
- Jenna Walker — lead vocals
- Stuart Walker — lead vocals
- Derek Wells — guitar, mandolin

== Charts ==
Chart (2020)	Peak position
Canada (Canadian Hot 100)	87
Canada Country (Billboard)	4

== Certifications ==
Region	Certification	Certified units/sales
Canada (Music Canada)	Platinum	80,000^{‡}
^{‡} Sales+streaming figures based on certification alone.
