= Feels Like That =

2018 single by the Reklaws

Single by the Reklaws

from the album Freshman Year
- Released: August 31, 2018
- Genre: Country pop
- Length: 3:26 (song); 23:02 (EP)
- Label: Universal Canada
- Songwriters: Stuart Walker; Todd Clark; Travis Wood; Donovan Woods
- Producer: Todd Clark

The Reklaws singles chronology
"Long Live the Night" (2018)	"Feels Like That" (2018)	"I Do Too" (2019)

Music video
- "Feels Like That" on YouTube

"Feels Like That" is a song recorded by Canadian country duo the Reklaws. The track was co-written by duo member Stuart Walker with Travis Wood, Donovan Woods, and the track's producer Todd Clark. The song was released on a seven-track EP of the same name, and became the third single off the Reklaws' debut album Freshman Year.

== Commercial performance ==
"Feels Like That" was certified Gold by Music Canada on October 2, 2019, with over 40,000 sales, later achieving Platinum status on July 19, 2023. It reached a peak of #1 on the Billboard Canada Country chart dated January 26, 2019, marking their first chart-topper.

== Music video ==
The official music video for "Feels Like That" premiered on January 31, 2019 and was directed by Ben Knechtel. It was shot in Banff, Alberta and Malibu, California, entirely using an iPhone XS camera.

== Track listings ==
Radio single

1. "Feels Like That" – 3:31

CD - EP

No.	Title	Writer(s)	Length
1.	"Feels Like That"	Stuart Walker; Todd Clark; Travis Wood; Donovan Woods	3:31
2.	"Raised by the Radio"	Jenna Walker; S. Walker; Slate; Wood	3:26
3.	"Missing You"	J. Walker; S. Walker; Slate; Wood	2:51
4.	"Long Live the Night"	S. Walker; Clark; Wood	3:24
5.	"Last Call"	J. Walker; S. Walker; Clark; Sarah Haze	2:56
6.	"Wish You Were Beer" (featuring James Barker Band)	J. Walker; S. Walker; Dakota Jay; William King	3:48
7.	"Hometown Kids"	J. Walker; S. Walker; Slate; Wood	3:09
Total length:			23:02

== Charts ==
Chart (2018–19)	Peak position
Canada Country (Billboard)	1

== Certifications ==
Region	Certification	Certified units/sales
Canada (Music Canada)	Platinum	80,000^{‡}
^{‡} Sales+streaming figures based on certification alone.

== Release history ==
Release formats for Feels Like That
Country	Date	Format	Label	Ref.
Various	August 31, 2018	Digital download	Universal Music Canada	
Various	September 7, 2018	Compact disc	Universal Music Canada	
