= Good Ol' Days (album) =

2023 album by the Reklaws

Studio album by the Reklaws
- Released: November 4, 2022
- Genre: Country; country pop
- Length: 32:47
- Label: Starseed
- Producer: Todd Clark; Callum Maudsley; Gavin Slate

The Reklaws chronology
Sophomore Slump (2020)	Good Ol' Days (2022)	The Reklaws: Live at History (2023)

Singles from Good Ol' Days
- 1. "11 Beers" Released: March 11, 2022; 2. "Good Ol' Days" Released: January 9, 2023

Good Ol' Days is the third album of Canadian country music duo the Reklaws. It was released on November 4, 2022, via Starseed Records. It includes the previously released single "11 Beers", as well as six previously released songs from 2021 and 2022, including "What the Truck". The album was nominated for "Country Album of the Year" at the 2023 Juno Awards and was named the "Top Selling Canadian Album of the Year" at the 2023 Canadian Country Music Awards.

== Background ==
Most of the tracks on Good Ol' Days were written during the COVID-19 pandemic. Stuart Walker of the Reklaws stated that the album is "a collection of tracks that tell the story of what we were going through at the time," adding that it "allows us to close that time of our lives and look forward to what's in front of us". The three tracks "Middle Fingers", "People Don't Talk About", and "Good Ol' Days" were the only new songs on the album, while the rest of the songs had already been released, with the exception of an acoustic version of "What the Truck". The title track "Good Ol' Days" was later sent to Canadian country radio in January 2023.

== Critical reception ==
James Daykin of Entertainment Focus favourably reviewed Good Ol' Days, calling it a "classy album full of uptempo party songs and tender, emotional ballad", adding that it has "refreshing naivety to it that comes across as both authentic and very meaningful", while noting the "strength of [the Reklaws'] vocals and the cleverness of their writing ability". Melissa Wiseman of Canadian Beats Media stated that with this album the Reklaws "prove why they are unstoppable when it comes to breaking down boundaries in country music".

== Track listing ==
No.	Title	Writer(s)	Length
1.	"Good Ol' Days"	Jenna Walker; Stuart Walker; Gavin Slate; Travis Wood; Donovan Woods	2:46
2.	"Middle Fingers"	Emily Reid; Fred Wilhelm; Oscar Charles	3:00
3.	"People Don't Talk About"	Walker; Walker; Callum Maudsley	3:17
4.	"11 Beers" (with Jake Owen)	Ashley Gorley; Michael Hardy; Hunter Phelps; Benjamin Johnson	3:24
5.	"Cowboy"	Walker; Walker; Maudsley; Scott Helman	2:55
6.	"The Downside"	S. Walker; Maudsley; Alex Fleming	3:07
7.	"What the Truck" (with Sacha)	Walker; Walker; Maudsley; Sacha Visagie	2:24
8.	"Hay is for Horses"	Walker; Walker; Grady Block; Griffen Palmer	3:05
9.	"Got It From My Mama"	J. Walker; Wood; Woods	3:18
10.	"Happy Hours"	Walker; Walker; Kelly Archer; Tawgs Salter	2:51
11.	"What the Truck (Acoustic)" (with Sacha)	Walker; Walker; Maudsley; Visagie	2:36
Total length:			32:47

== Charts ==
=== Singles ===
Year	Single	Peak chart positions		Certifications
Year	Single	CAN Country	CAN	Certifications
2022	"11 Beers"	1	56	MC: Platinum
2023	"Good Ol' Days"	12	—	

=== Promotional singles ===
Year	Single	Peak chart positions	Certifications
Year	Single	CAN Digital	Certifications
2021	"Got It From My Mama"	—	
2021	"What the Truck"	25	MC: Platinum
2021	"Happy Hours"	—	
2022	"Hay is for Horses"	—	
2024	"People Don't Talk About"	22	

== Awards and nominations ==
Year	Association	Category	Nominated work	Result	Ref.
2023	Juno Awards	Country Album of the Year	Good Ol' Days	Nominated	
2023	Canadian Country Music Association	Album of the Year	Good Ol' Days	Nominated	
2023	Canadian Country Music Association	Musical Collaboration of the Year	"11 Beers"	Nominated	
2023	Canadian Country Music Association	Single of the Year	"11 Beers"	Nominated	
2023	Canadian Country Music Association	Top Selling Canadian Album of the Year	Good Ol' Days	Won	

== Release history ==
Release formats for Good Ol' Days
Country	Date	Format	Label	Ref.
Various	November 4, 2022	Digital download	Starseed Records	
Various	November 4, 2022	Streaming	Starseed Records	
