= What the Truck =

2021 song by the Reklaws and Sacha

Promotional single by The Reklaws and Sacha

from the album Good Ol' Days
- Released: May 28, 2021
- Genre: Country pop
- Length: 2:23
- Label: Reklaws Music; Starseed
- Songwriter(s): Stuart Walker; Jenna Walker; Callum Maudsley; Sacha Visagie
- Producer(s): Callum Maudsley

Music video
- "What the Truck" on YouTube

"What the Truck" is a song recorded by Canadian country duo The Reklaws with fellow Canadian country artist Sacha. The sibling duo co-wrote the track with producer Callum Maudsley. It was included on Sacha's 2022 extended play We Did, and the Reklaws' third studio album Good Ol' Days.

== Background and development ==
The Reklaws wrote the song during the COVID-19 pandemic. Facing many lockdown restrictions, they said the song "just poured out," adding "frustrations were brewing and all we wanted to do was get out of the house". The two described the song as "fun and light".

The duo shared a brief clip of the song on social media platform TikTok in February 2021, initially asking fans for their opinion on whether they should finish and record the song. After garnering many views, they made another post asking fans and followers to submit their own verse. Fellow country artist Sacha, also from Ontario, was chosen to join them on the track after making her own submission. Sacha remarked that she saw the Reklaws' TikTok post looking for a collaboration, and was writing something that she "felt might fit". Soon after posting her submission, she received a message from Jenna Walker of the Reklaws asking her to join them on the track. Jenna Walker remarked that Sacha's verse "really stood out," and that they recorded her part in one night.

== Critical reception ==
Chad Benson of Today's Country 95.5 called the track an "ideal windows rolled down, summer song". Amplify Music Magazine said the Reklaws were "heating things up" heading into summer with "What the Truck". Top Country stated that the duo "certainly made the right choice" when they selected Sacha to join them on the song. Hannah Smith of The Nash News described the song as a "fun and aggressive track," adding that it was "definitely fitting for the past years".

== Accolades ==
Accolades for "What the Truck"
Year	Association	Category	Result	Ref
2022	CCMA	Top Selling Canadian Single Of The Year	Won	

== Commercial performance ==
"What the Truck" debuted at number 25 on the Billboard Hot Canadian Digital Songs chart the week after its release. It garnered over 450,000 domestic streams in its first week, setting a record for the most domestically streamed Canadian country song in a single week. It also became the fastest Canadian country song to reach 1 Million domestic streams. The song has received immense attention on TikTok, topping their playlist of country songs in both Canada and the United States. It was certified Gold by Music Canada less than four months after its release, making it the fastest Canadian country song to reach gold-certification in the streaming era.

== Music video ==
The official music video for "What the Truck" premiered on CMT on July 14, 2021. It was directed by Austin Chaffe, and features the Reklaws and Sacha singing the song either in a Dodge Ram truck, or with the truck in the background. The video was shot at a farm owned by a friend of the Reklaws, and was filmed by a small two-man crew due to COVID-19 pandemic restrictions.

== Charts ==
Chart performance for "What the Truck"
Chart (2021)	Peak position
Canada Digital Songs (Billboard)	25

== Certifications ==
Certifications for "What the Truck"
Region	Certification	Certified units/sales
Canada (Music Canada)	Platinum	80,000^{‡}
^{‡} Sales+streaming figures based on certification alone.
