= Secret Agent Man (TV series) =

- Genre: Spy-fi
- Created by: Barry Josephson; Richard Regen; Barry Sonnenfeld
- Directed by: Barry Sonnenfeld; Jefery Levy; Bo Welch
- Starring: Costas Mandylor; Dina Meyer; Dondre Whitfield; Paul Guilfoyle; Musetta Vander
- Opening theme: "Secret Agent Man" performed by Johnny Rivers
- Composer: David Bergeaud
- Country of origin: United States
- Original language: English
- No. of seasons: 1
- No. of episodes: 12 (1 unaired)

Production
- Executive producers: Michael Duggan; Barry Josephson; Barry Sonnenfeld
- Producer: Flody Suarez
- Production locations: Vancouver, British Columbia, Canada
- Cinematography: Greg Gardiner
- Editors: Joanne D'Antonio; Lynn Leonhard; James R. Symons
- Running time: 60 minutes
- Production companies: Sonnenfeld Josephson Worldwide Entertainment; Columbia TriStar Television

Original release
- Network: UPN
- Release: 7 March – 28 July 2000

Secret Agent Man is an American spy-fi television series that aired on UPN from 7 March to 28 July 2000. The series was created by writer Richard Regen.

== Premise ==
Secret Agent Man starred Costas Mandylor as Monk, a gallivanting secret agent, who was one of a team of agents that included Holliday, played by Dina Meyer and Davis, played by Dondre Whitfield. The team reported to Brubeck, played by Paul Guilfoyle. The periodically appearing guest villain is the former agent Prima, played by Musetta Vander.

All the lead characters share the last names of jazz musicians: Thelonious Monk, Billie Holiday, Miles Davis, Dave Brubeck and Louis Prima.

== Cast ==
=== Main ===
- Costas Mandylor as Monk
- Dina Meyer as Holliday
- Dondre Whitfield as Davis
- Paul Guilfoyle as Brubeck

=== Notable guest stars ===
- Musetta Vander as Prima
- Grace Park as Louann
- John de Lancie as Marshall Gilder
- Diane Farr as Trish Fiore
- Ivana Milicevic as Laura Tupolev
- Lola Glaudini as Helga Devereaux
- Salli Richardson-Whitfield as Rachel
- Alexondra Lee as Nurse 613
- Wade Williams as Greg

== Production ==
Secret Agent Man was originally scheduled to premiere on UPN in September 1999, but was pushed back to a midseason premiere in August 2000 due to the desire to give the show's producers more time to work on props and special effects. It also did not have a traditional one-hour pilot filmed, and was instead ordered to series by UPN on the strength of just a presentation reel. Only 12 episodes were produced and broadcast before the series was cancelled due to poor ratings.

=== Theme song ===
The series used an updated version of the 1960s hit, “Secret Agent Man”, performed by Supreme Beings of Leisure, for its theme song. Because the Johnny Rivers version of this song was used as the theme song for American broadcasts of another television series, the 1960s British TV series, Danger Man (primarily broadcast in the U.S. as Secret Agent), there were some mistaken impressions that this series was somehow a spin off or remake of the earlier program, but other than the theme song, no connections were made evident.

== Episodes ==
No.	Title	Directed by	Written by	Original release date	Prod. code
1	"From Prima with Love"	Perry Lang	Story by : Alan Eisenstock & Larry Mintz; Teleplay by : Chris Dickie	March 7, 2000	107
2	"Back to School"	Jefery Levy	Rick Copp	March 14, 2000	105
3	"WhupSumAss"	Greg Beeman	Sandy Frank	March 21, 2000	108
4	"Like Father, Like Monk"	Paul Abascal	Adam Sigel	March 28, 2000	111
5	"Supernaked"	Jefery Levy	Joel Fields	April 4, 2000	102
6	"The Elders"	Craig Zisk	Elizabeth M. Cosin	May 26, 2000	112
7	"The Face"	Sarah Pia Anderson	Greg Plageman	June 2, 2000	104
8	"Sleepers"	Deran Serafian	Chris Dickie	June 9, 2000	103
9	"Uncle S.A.M."	Andy Wolk	Paul Redford	July 7, 2000	109
10	"Fail-Safe"	Bo Welch	Chris Dickie	July 14, 2000	110
11	"TKO Henry"	Stuart Gillard	Michael Duggan	July 21, 2000	101
12	"Breach"	James Quinn	Joel Fields & Brent V. Friedman	July 28, 2000	106
13	"Secret Service"	Maura Tierney	Richard Regen & Michael Duggan	Unaired	113

== Reception ==
On Rotten Tomatoes, the series has an aggregated score of 0% based on 10 critic reviews. The website’s consensus reads: "With stilted acting and genre cliches galore, Secret Agent Man is one spy show that should be disavowed by viewers at all costs."
