= I Do Too =

2019 single by the Reklaws

Single by the Reklaws

from the album Freshman Year
- Released: March 27, 2019
- Genre: Country pop
- Length: 3:20
- Label: Universal Canada
- Songwriter(s): Jenna Walker; Stuart Walker; Brad Rempel; Ben Stennis
- Producer(s): Todd Clark

The Reklaws singles chronology
"Feels Like That" (2018)	"I Do Too" (2019)	"Old Country Soul" (2019)

"I Do Too" is a song co-written and recorded by Canadian country music duo the Reklaws. The duo wrote the song with Brad Rempel of High Valley and Ben Stennis. It was the fourth single off their second studio album Freshman Year.

== Critical reception ==
"I Do Too" was named Top Country Pick of the Week for June 11, 2019. They stated that the song "illustrates the struggle of self-doubt, even when your dreams are coming true", calling it an "important message".

== Commercial performance ==
"I Do Too" reached a peak of number 6 on the Billboard Canada Country chart dated August 17, 2019. It also peaked at #98 on Canadian Hot 100 in the same week. It has been certified Platinum by Music Canada.

== Credits and personnel ==
Credits adapted from Freshman Year CD booklet.

- Todd Clark — production, engineering, programming, backing vocals, guitar, keyboard
- Andrew Mendelson — mastering
- Sean Moffitt — mixing
- Mike Waldron — guitar, banjo
- Jenna Walker — lead vocals
- Stuart Walker — lead vocals
- Derek Wells — guitar

== Charts ==
Chart (2019)	Peak position
Canada (Canadian Hot 100)	98
Canada Country (Billboard)	6

== Certifications ==
Region	Certification	Certified units/sales
Canada (Music Canada)	Platinum	80,000^{‡}
^{‡} Sales+streaming figures based on certification alone.
