= Honky Tonkin' About =

2023 single by the Reklaws and Drake Milligan

Single by The Reklaws and Drake Milligan
- Released: July 28, 2023
- Genre: Country
- Length: 3:05
- Label: Starseed
- Songwriters: Stuart Walker; Blake Redferrin; Callum Maudsley; Thomas Salter
- Producer: Tawgs Salter

The Reklaws singles chronology
"Good Ol' Days" (2022)	"Honky Tonkin' About" (2023)	"I Grew Up on a Farm" (2024)

Drake Milligan singles chronology
"Sounds Like Something I'd Do" (2022)	"Honky Tonkin' About" (2023)

Music video
- "Honky Tonkin' About" on YouTube

"Honky Tonkin' About" is a song recorded by Canadian country music duo The Reklaws and American country music artist Drake Milligan. Stuart Walker of the Reklaws wrote the song with Blake Redferrin, Callum Maudsley, and Tawgs Salter, while Salter produced the track.

The song reached number one on the Canadian Country Singles Chart, becoming the fourth chart topper for the duo, and Milligan's first.

== Background ==
Stuart Walker of the Reklaws wrote "Honky Tonkin' About" during the COVID-19 pandemic with his friends and frequent collaborators. The four "sat down and thought about what we would want to party to at a honky tonk on a Friday night with our friends". Jenna Walker remarked that the song is a "little more western than what you might be used to" from the sibling duo. Drake Milligan added that he was "honoured" to join the duo for his first featured appearance on a song.

== Critical reception ==
Madeleine O'Connell of Country Now referred to "Honky Tonkin' About" as a "rowdy tune with the kind of grit that gets country music lovers on their feet and ready for a night out". She also noted the inspiration of western music in the song. Bee Delores of Countrypolitan positively reviewed the track, calling it "an addicting saloon-style track ripe for hot summer nights and late-night drinking". James Daykin of Entertainment Focus favourably reviewed the song, saying it "blends classic country swagger with The Reklaws’ signature rowdy party vibes, creating an irresistibly catchy tune that’s bound to get your feet moving".

== Live performances ==
The Reklaws appeared on Citytv's Breakfast Television shortly after the song's release to promote their recently released live album The Reklaws: Live at History and perform "Honky Tonkin' About" live on air. In September 2023, the duo appeared on television station CHCH's "Music Friday" series to perform the song live. Later that month, Milligan joined the duo to perform the song live at the 2023 Canadian Country Music Awards in Hamilton, Ontario. The show was broadcast live on CTV in Canada, and their performance was later uploaded to YouTube.

== Accolades ==
Year	Association	Category	Result	Ref
2024	Country Music Association of Ontario	Music Video of the Year	Won	
2024	Country Music Association of Ontario	Single of the Year	Nominated	
2024	Canadian Country Music Association	Music Video of the Year	Nominated	
2024	Canadian Country Music Association	Vocal Collaboration of the Year	Won	

== Music video ==
The official music video for "Honky Tonkin' About" premiered on CMT in the United States on October 19, 2023. It was filmed on-site in Romania, and features Christopher McDonald, Jonathan Pryce, Robert Knepper, and Mary-Louise Parker. The video was directed by Mac Grant, Chad Tennies, and Ben Knechtel.

== Charts ==
Chart performance for "Honky Tonkin' About"
Chart (2023–2024)	Peak position
Australia Country Hot 50 (The Music)	10
Canada Country (Billboard)	1
Canada Digital Songs (Billboard)	35

== Certifications ==
Region	Certification	Certified units/sales
Canada (Music Canada)	Gold	40,000^{‡}
^{‡} Sales+streaming figures based on certification alone.
