= Roots (World Junior Song) =

2018 song by the Reklaws

Promotional single by The Reklaws
- Released: December 21, 2018
- Length: 3:20
- Label: Umusic
- Songwriter(s): Jenna Walker; Stuart Walker; Jenson Vaughan; Massimo Alonzi
- Producer(s): Todd Clark; Ian Smith

Music video
- "Roots" 2020 IIHF World Juniors on YouTube

"Roots (World Junior Song)" is a song co-written and recorded by Canadian country music duo The Reklaws. The song was co-written by the duo with Jenson Vaughan and Massimo Alonzi. It was the official song for the TSN broadcast of the IIHF World Junior Hockey Championship in 2019 and 2020.

== Background ==
Jenna Walker said the message behind the song is "no matter how far you get or how many lucky breaks you have in this life, always be thankful and reminded of what got you there in the first place".

== Critical reception ==
Bell Media hockey website BarDown declared that if the song "doesn't get you fired up, nothing will".

== Commercial performance ==
"Roots" reached a peak of #6 on the Billboard Hot Canadian Digital Song Sales chart for the week of January 18, 2020, following its spot on the TSN broadcast for the 2020 IIHF World Juniors. It was certified Gold by Music Canada.

== Music video ==
The official music video for "Roots" premiered on December 23, 2019, and made its television broadcast premiere on TSN on December 26 prior to the Canada vs. U.S.A world junior hockey game.

== Charts ==
Chart (2020)	Peak position
Canada Digital Songs (Billboard)	6

== Certifications ==
Region	Certification	Certified units/sales
Canada (Music Canada)	Gold	40,000^{‡}
^{‡} Sales+streaming figures based on certification alone.
