= The Reklaws =

Canadian country music duo

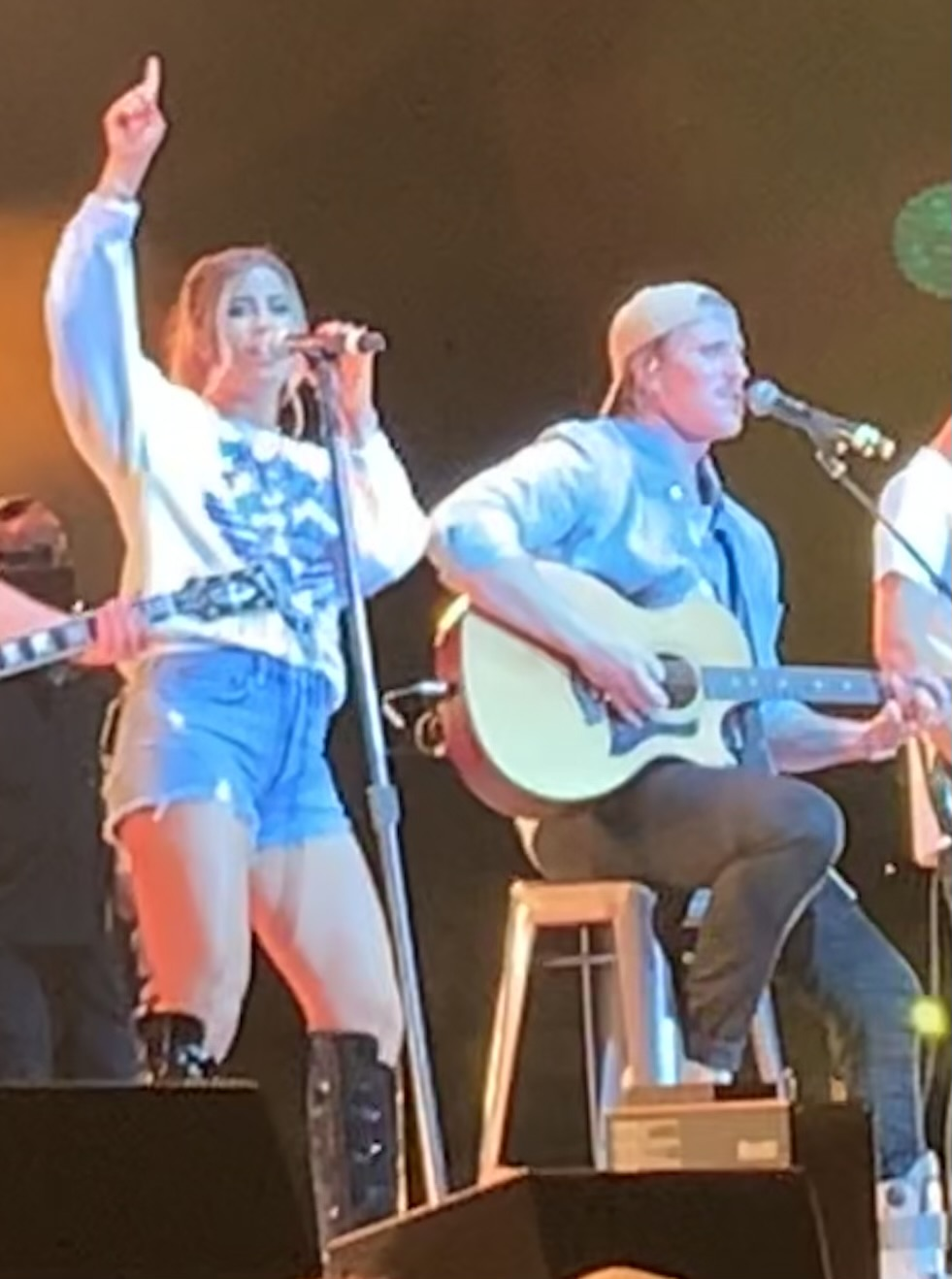
- The Reklaws performing at Budweiser Stage in Toronto, Ontario in September 2021

Background information
- Origin: North Dumfries, Ontario, Canada
- Genres: Country; country pop; neotraditional country
- Years active: 2012–present
- Labels: Starseed; Universal Canada
- Members: Stuart Walker; Jenna Walker
- Website: Official website

The Reklaws are a Canadian country music duo from North Dumfries, Ontario, formed in 2012. The duo consists of siblings Stuart and Jenna Walker. They have released three albums, Freshman Year, Sophomore Slump, and Good Ol' Days. The duo has achieved four number one hits with "Feels Like That", "Can't Help Myself", "11 Beers", and "Honky Tonkin' About" on the Canada Country chart, in addition to multiple gold and platinum certified singles.

== Origins ==
The Walker siblings grew up in North Dumfries, Ontario and are two in a family of seven. Their parents owned and operated the Yee Haw Adventure Farm, where they used to perform for visitors. They attended Glenview Park Secondary School in Cambridge, Ontario. They would regularly perform at Talent Shows for the school.

They got their band name from their mother, who suggested the Reklaws sounded more interesting than the Walkers, Sibling Rivalry, or Bro-Sis. Reklaw is Walker spelled backwards.

The Reklaws were often mistaken for a romantic couple rather than siblings during the early part of their music career. One interviewer asked Jenna Walker and Stuart Walker how long the pair had been dating and based every question on an assumed romantic relationship, which created an awkward situation for the siblings. On many other occasions people told the duo that they would make great parents together. This public confusion about their sibling relationship initially made the Reklaws hesitant to include songs about romantic themes in their early work.

They were nominated for the CCMA Discovery Artist Award in 2013 and then won the Emerging Artist Showcase at the Boots and Hearts Music Festival in 2013. They met with several Nashville songwriters before being signed by Universal Music Canada.

== Career ==
=== 2017–2020: Freshman Year and Sophomore Slump ===
The duo scored their first national country music hit in 2017 with "Hometown Kids".

In 2018, they released the EP Long Live the Night. The EP's title track was released in both a "regular" version and a Canadian Football League-themed rewrite which served as a theme song for CFL on TSN games. Their EP Feels Like That was released in 2018 and received a Juno Award nomination for Country Album of the Year. Later in the year they won the Rising Star Award at the Canadian Country Music Association Awards, and performed the kickoff show at the 2018 Grey Cup. The track "Feels Like That" became the duo's first Number One Canada Country hit in January 2019.

In August 2019, the Reklaws released their debut full-length album, Freshman Year on Universal Music Canada. The album included the previously released singles "Hometown Kids", "Long Live the Night", and "Feels Like That", in addition to the top ten hits "I Do Too" and "Old Country Soul".

Their song "Roots" was selected as the official song for TSN's broadcast of the IIHF World Junior Hockey Championship in 2019 and 2020.

In February 2020, the Reklaws joined Dean Brody on the single "Can't Help Myself". The song would top the Canada Country chart and set the record for most played song ever at Canadian country radio in a single week on the Nielsen BDS charts with 1782 spins. In October 2020, the Reklaws released their second album, Sophomore Slump, featuring their singles, "Where I'm From" and "Not Gonna Not".

=== 2021–present: Good Ol' Days ===
In May 2021, they independently released the promotional single "What the Truck" with fellow Canadian country artist Sacha. The song debuted with over 450,000 streams in its first week, setting the record for the most streamed Canadian country song in a single week. It then became the fastest Canadian country song to reach 1 Million domestic streams. Alongside Brett Kissel, they featured on the single "Somewhere to Drink" by their new labelmate Nate Haller in September 2021. In March 2022, they released the single "11 Beers" with American country artist Jake Owen. They released their third studio album Good Ol' Days on Starseed Records on November 4, 2022.

In 2023, they participated in an all-star recording of Serena Ryder's single "What I Wouldn't Do", which was released as a charity single to benefit Kids Help Phone's Feel Out Loud campaign for youth mental health. Later that year, they collaborated with Drake Milligan on their single "Honky Tonkin' About". In 2024, they released the singles "I Grew Up on a Farm" and "One Beer Away". That same year, they appeared on season 19 of the reality television show America's Got Talent, where they reached the quarterfinals stage. In September 2024, the Reklaws released the extended play Outliving (for Mom) to honour their late mother. The EP's release coincided with the launching of the "Flo Walker Stardust Fund" to support Kids Help Phone, on the day of what would have been their mother's sixtieth's birthday.

In May 2025, the Reklaws released the single "Never Drinking Again" and the promotional single "We're Back Baby". In the late summer and fall of 2026, the Reklaws will embark on the "Hometown Heroes Tour" across Canada, co-headlining with Dean Brody.

== Tours ==
- Winter's a Beach
- Friends Don’t Let Friends Tour Alone Tour (opening act for Dallas Smith and Dean Brody)
- Winter's a Beach 2.0

== Discography ==
=== Albums ===
Title	Details	Peak chart positions	Certifications
Title	Details	CAN	Certifications
Freshman Year	Released: August 27, 2019; Label: Universal Music Canada; Format: CD, vinyl, digital download, streaming	87	MC: Gold
Sophomore Slump	Released: October 16, 2020; Label: Universal Music Canada; Format: CD, vinyl, digital download, streaming	—	
Good Ol' Days	Released: November 4, 2022; Label: Starseed Records; Format: Digital download, streaming	—	
Blood, Sweat & Beers	Released: October 16, 2026; Label: Starseed Records; Format: Digital download, streaming	To be released	

=== Live albums ===
Title	Details
The Reklaws: Live at History	Release date: July 28, 2023; Label: Starseed Records; Format: Digital download, streaming

=== Extended plays ===
Title	Details
Long Live the Night	Release date: February 16, 2018; Label: Universal Music Canada; Format: Digital download, streaming
Feels Like That	Release date: August 31, 2018; Label: Universal Music Canada; Format: CD, digital download, streaming
Where I'm From (Deluxe)	Release date: July 17, 2020; Label: Universal Music Canada; Format: Digital download, streaming
Outliving (For Mom)	Release date: September 27, 2024; Label: Starseed Records; Format: Digital download, streaming

=== Singles ===
==== As lead artist ====
Year	Title	Peak chart positions		Certifications	Album
Year	Title	CAN	CAN Country	Certifications	Album
2017	"Hometown Kids"	—	16	MC: Gold	Feels Like That
2018	"Long Live the Night"	— (Note: "Long Live the Night" did not enter the Canadian Hot 100, but peaked at number 25 on the Canadian Digital Song Sales component chart.)	6	MC: 2× Platinum	Feels Like That
2018	"Feels Like That"	—	1	MC: Platinum	Feels Like That
2019	"I Do Too"	98	6	MC: Platinum	Freshman Year
2019	"Old Country Soul"	87	4	MC: Platinum	Freshman Year
2020	"Can't Help Myself" (with Dean Brody)	49	1	MC: 3× Platinum	Boys
2020	"Where I'm From"	73	2	MC: Platinum	Sophomore Slump
2020	"Not Gonna Not"	74	5	MC: Gold	Sophomore Slump
2022	"11 Beers" (with Jake Owen)	56	1	MC: Platinum	Good Ol' Days
2023	"Good Ol' Days"	—	12		Good Ol' Days
2023	"Honky Tonkin' About" (with Drake Milligan)	— (Note: "Honky Tonkin' About" did not enter the Canadian Hot 100, but peaked at number 35 on the Canadian Digital Song Sales component chart.)	1	MC: Gold	—N/a
2024	"I Grew Up on a Farm"	—	5	MC: Gold	—N/a
2024	"One Beer Away"	96	6	MC: Gold	—N/a
2025	"Never Drinking Again"	97	5		—N/a
2026	"Hometown Heroes" (featuring Dean Brody)	—	7		Blood, Sweat & Beers
2026	"Ain't Seen Nothing Yet"	—	—		Blood, Sweat & Beers

==== As featured artist ====
Year	Title	Artist	Peak positions	Album
Year	Title	Artist	CAN Country	Album
2021	"Somewhere to Drink" (with Brett Kissel)	Nate Haller	25	Party in the Back

=== Promotional singles ===
Year	Title	Peak chart positions	Certifications	Album
Year	Title	CAN Digital	Certifications	Album
2013	"Kiss Kiss"	—		Non-album singles
2014	"Seeing Stars"	—		Non-album singles
2015	"Sun Drunk"	—		Non-album singles
2018	"Roots (World Junior Song)"	6	MC: Gold	Non-album singles
2021	"Got It From My Mama"	—		Good Ol' Days
2021	"What the Truck" (with Sacha)	25	MC: Platinum	Good Ol' Days
2021	"Happy Hours"	—		Good Ol' Days
2022	"Hay is for Horses"	—		Good Ol' Days
2024	"People Don’t Talk About"	22		Good Ol' Days
2025	"We're Back Baby"	*		TBA
2025	"You Had to Be There"	*		TBA
2025	"Bonfire on the Beach"	*		TBA
"—" denotes releases that did not chart "*" denotes releases where no chart existed

=== Music videos ===
Year	Title	Director
2017	"Hometown Kids"	Ben Knechtel
2018	"Long Live the Night"	Ben Knechtel
2019	"Feels Like That"	Ben Knechtel
2019	"Old Country Soul"	Ben Knechtel
2019	"Roots (World Junior Song)"	Ben Knechtel
2020	"Can't Help Myself" (with Dean Brody)	Ben Knechtel
2020	"Where I'm From"	Ben Knechtel
2020	"Not Gonna Not"	Ben Knechtel
2021	"What the Truck" (with Sacha)	Austin Chaffe
2021	"Somewhere to Drink" (with Nate Haller and Brett Kissel)	Ben Knechtel
2023	"Middle Fingers"	Ben Knechtel
2023	"Honky Tonkin' About" (with Drake Milligan)	Mac Grant; Chad Tennies; Ben Knechtel

== Awards and nominations ==
Year	Association	Category	Nominated work	Result	Citation
2013	Canadian Country Music Awards	Discovery Award	—N/a	Nominated	
2013	Boots and Hearts	Emerging Artist Showcase	—N/a	Won	
2018	Canadian Country Music Awards	Rising Star Award	—N/a	Won	
2018	Canadian Country Music Awards	Group or Duo of the Year	—N/a	Nominated	
2018	Canadian Country Music Awards	Video of the Year	"Hometown Kids"	Nominated	
2019	Juno Awards	Country Album of the Year	Feels Like That	Nominated	
2019	Canadian Country Music Awards	Album of the Year	Feels Like That	Won	
2019	Canadian Country Music Awards	Fans' Choice Award	—N/a	Nominated	
2019	Canadian Country Music Awards	Group or Duo of the Year	—N/a	Nominated	
2019	Canadian Country Music Awards	Video of the Year	"Feels Like That"	Nominated	
2020	Juno Awards	Group of the Year	—N/a	Nominated	
2020	Canadian Country Music Awards	Entertainer of the Year	—N/a	Nominated	
2020	Canadian Country Music Awards	Fans' Choice Award	—N/a	Nominated	
2020	Canadian Country Music Awards	Group or Duo of the Year	—N/a	Nominated	
2020	Canadian Country Music Awards	Songwriter(s) of the Year	"I Do Too" (shared Brad Rempel, Ben Stennis)	Nominated	
2020	CMAO Awards	Single of the Year	"Old Country Soul"	Nominated	
2020	CMAO Awards	Album of the Year	Freshman Year	Nominated	
2020	CMAO Awards	Group or Duo of the Year	—N/a	Won	
2020	CMAO Awards	Music Video of the Year	"Feels Like That"	Nominated	
2020	CMAO Awards	Fans' Choice	—N/a	Won	
2021	Juno Awards of 2021	Group of the Year	—N/a	Nominated	
2021	CMAO Awards	Fans' Choice	—N/a	Nominated	
2021	CMAO Awards	Group or Duo of the Year	—N/a	Nominated	
2021	CMAO Awards	MRC Data Compass Award	—N/a	Won	
2021	CMAO Awards	Music Video of the Year	"Where I'm From"	Nominated	
2021	2021 Canadian Country Music Awards	Entertainer of the Year	—N/a	Nominated	
2021	2021 Canadian Country Music Awards	Fans' Choice Award	—N/a	Nominated	
2021	2021 Canadian Country Music Awards	Group or Duo of the Year	—N/a	Won	
2021	2021 Canadian Country Music Awards	Interactive Artist or Group of the Year	—N/a	Nominated	
2021	2021 Canadian Country Music Awards	Single of the Year	"Can't Help Myself"	Nominated	
2021	2021 Canadian Country Music Awards	Single of the Year	"Where I'm From"	Nominated	
2022	Juno Awards of 2022	Country Album of the Year	Sophomore Slump	Nominated	
2022	Juno Awards of 2022	Group of the Year	—N/a	Nominated	
2022	CMAO Awards	Fans' Choice	—N/a	Nominated	
2022	CMAO Awards	Group or Duo of the Year	—N/a	Nominated	
2022	CMAO Awards	Songwriter(s) of the Year	"More Drinkin' Than Fishin' (shared Gavin Slate, Travis Wood)	Nominated	
2022	Canadian Country Music Association	Group or Duo of the Year	—N/a	Won	
2022	Canadian Country Music Association	Interactive Artist or Group of the Year	—N/a	Nominated	
2022	Canadian Country Music Association	Fans' Choice	—N/a	Nominated	
2022	Canadian Country Music Association	Top Selling Canadian Single of the Year	"What the Truck" (with Sacha)	Won	
2023	Juno Awards of 2023	Country Album of the Year	Good Ol' Days	Nominated	
2023	Juno Awards of 2023	Fan Choice Award	—N/a	Nominated	
2023	Juno Awards of 2023	Group of the Year	—N/a	Nominated	
2023	CMAO Awards	Group or Duo of the Year	—N/a	Won	
2023	CMAO Awards	Compass Award	—N/a	Won	
2023	Canadian Country Music Association	Album of the Year	Good Ol' Days	Nominated	
2023	Canadian Country Music Association	Fans' Choice	—N/a	Nominated	
2023	Canadian Country Music Association	Group or Duo of the Year	—N/a	Nominated	
2023	Canadian Country Music Association	Musical Collaboration of the Year	"11 Beers" (with Jake Owen)	Nominated	
2023	Canadian Country Music Association	Single of the Year	"11 Beers" (with Jake Owen)	Nominated	
2023	Canadian Country Music Association	Top Selling Canadian Album of the Year	Good Ol' Days	Won	
2024	CMAO Awards	Fans' Choice	—N/a	Nominated	
2024	CMAO Awards	Group or Duo of the Year	—N/a	Nominated	
2024	CMAO Awards	Music Video of the Year	"Honky Tonkin' About" (with Drake Milligan)	Won	
2024	CMAO Awards	Single of the Year	"Honky Tonkin' About" (with Drake Milligan)	Nominated	
2024	Canadian Country Music Association	Entertainer of the Year	—N/a	Nominated	
2024	Canadian Country Music Association	Fans' Choice	—N/a	Nominated	
2024	Canadian Country Music Association	Group or Duo of the Year	—N/a	Nominated	
2024	Canadian Country Music Association	Music Video of the Year	"Honky Tonkin' About" (with Drake Milligan)	Nominated	
2024	Canadian Country Music Association	Vocal Collaboration of the Year	"Honky Tonkin' About" (with Drake Milligan)	Won	
2025	Country Music Association of Ontario	Fans' Choice	—N/a	Nominated	
2025	Canadian Country Music Association	Fans' Choice	—N/a	Nominated	
2025	Canadian Country Music Association	Group or Duo of the Year	—N/a	Nominated	
2025	Canadian Country Music Association	Innovative Campaign of the Year	Outliving (For Mom) EP Launch Campaign (with Starseed Entertainment)	Won	
2025	Canadian Country Music Association	Single of the Year	"I Grew Up on a Farm"	Nominated	
