= George Gallo =

American filmmaker

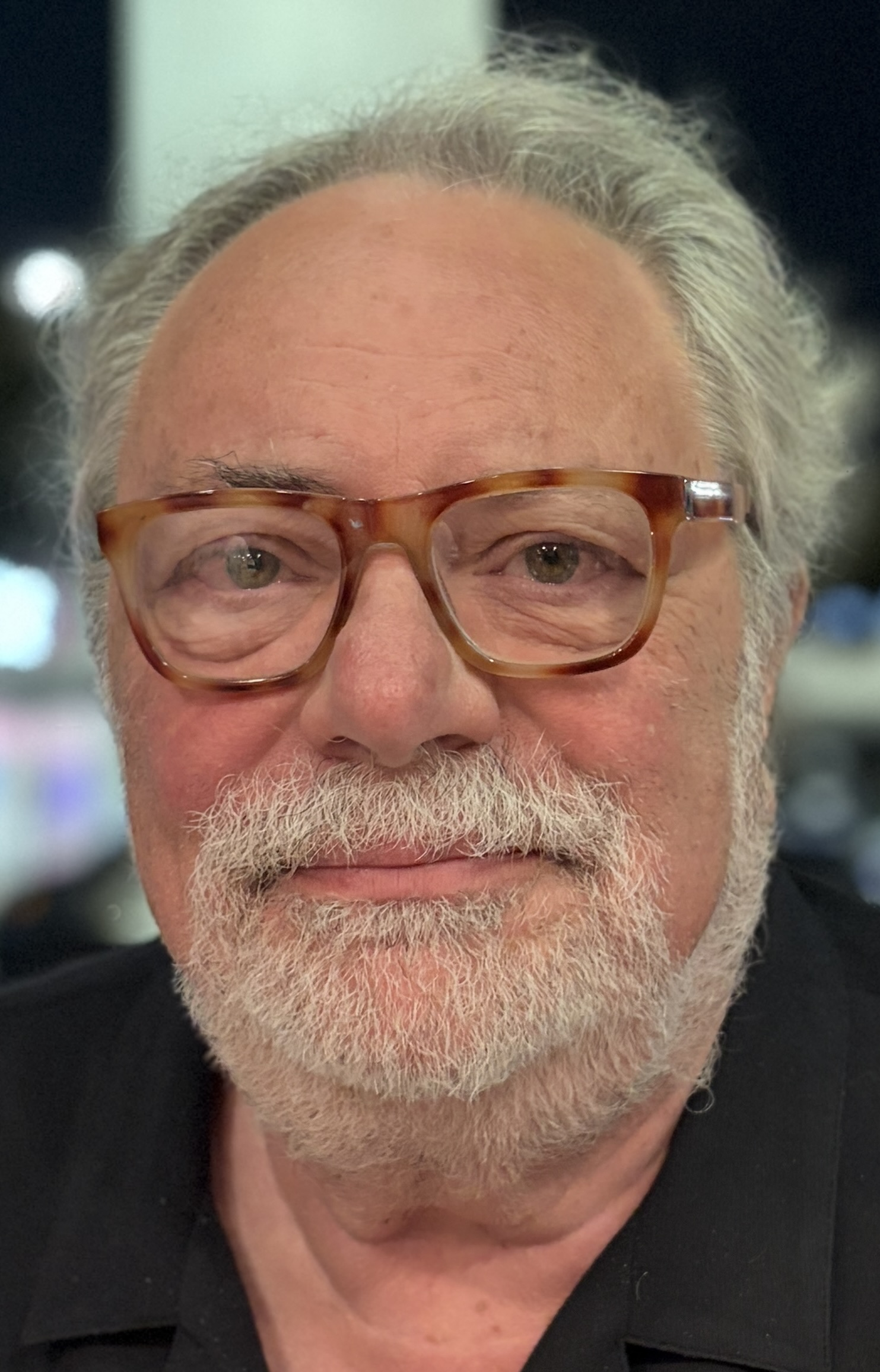
- Gallo in 2026
- Born: March 20, 1956 (age 70); Port Chester, New York, U.S.
- Occupations: Director, producer, screenwriter, musician, painter, author

George Gallo Jr. (born March 20, 1956) is an American screenwriter, film director, producer, painter, and musician. He is known for creating the Bad Boys franchise and has a story credit for the first film, Bad Boys. He also wrote Midnight Run and 29th Street, and is an accomplished painter in the style of the Pennsylvania Impressionists. In 1990, he won an award in The Arts for the Parks Top 100 managed by the National Park Academy of the Arts, Inc., and he has had three one-man exhibitions in New York City.

In 2010, Gallo wrote and directed the film Middle Men, starring Luke Wilson.

== Filmography ==
Year	Title	Director	Writer	Producer	Notes
1986	Wise Guys		Yes		
1988	Midnight Run		Yes		
1991	29th Street	Yes	Yes		Directorial debut
1994	Trapped in Paradise	Yes	Yes	Yes	
1995	Bad Boys		Story		
2001	Double Take	Yes	Yes		
2001	See Spot Run		Yes		
2003	DysFunktional Family	Yes			Documentary film
2004	The Whole Ten Yards		Yes		
2006	Local Color	Yes	Yes	Yes	
2007	Code Name: The Cleaner		Yes		
2008	My Mom's New Boyfriend	Yes	Yes		
2009	Middle Men	Yes	Yes		
2012	Columbus Circle	Yes	Yes		
2018	Bigger	Yes	Yes		
2019	David A. Leffel: An American Master	Yes			Documentary film
2019	The Poison Rose	Yes			
2020	The Comeback Trail	Yes	Yes		
2021	Vanquish	Yes	Yes		
2023	The Ritual Killer	Yes			
TBA	Red Card		Yes		

=== Producer only ===
Year	Title	Producer	Notes
1994	Another Midnight Run	Executive	Television films
1994	Midnight Runaround	Executive	Television films
2004	Most High	Executive	
2006	Waiting on Fountain	Executive	Short film
2008	Senior Skip Day	Executive	Direct-to-video
2011	Estranged		Short films
2012	Victoria's Turn	Executive	Short films
2018	Persephone: Pictures at the End of the World	Executive	

=== Other works ===
Year	Title	Credited as	Notes
1989	The Cover Girl and the Cop	Role: I.A. Officer	Television film
1989	Relentless	Role: Medical Examiner	
1999	Analyze This	Script revision	Uncredited
