= Dan Hedaya =

American actor (born 1940)

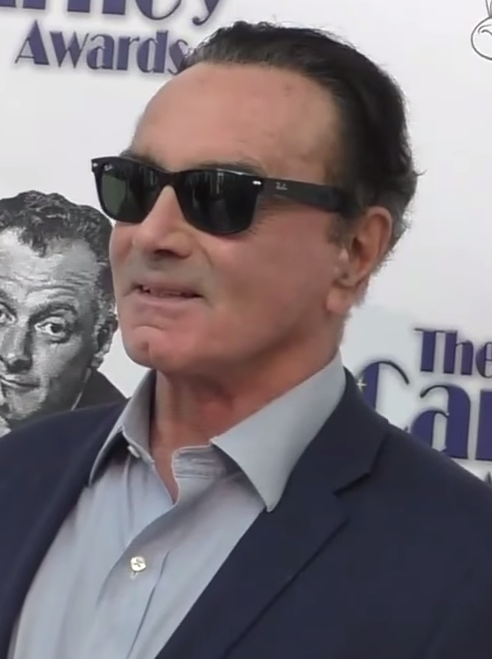
- Hedaya at the Carney Awards in 2016
- Born: July 24, 1940 (age 86); New York City, U.S.
- Education: Tufts University
- Occupation: Actor
- Years active: 1970–present

Daniel G. "Dan" Hedaya (born July 24, 1940) is an American actor best-known for his supporting roles in films such as Blood Simple, The Addams Family, Clueless, The Usual Suspects, A Night at the Roxbury, and Mulholland Drive.

== Early life ==
Hedaya was born in New York City, to a Sephardic Jewish family from Aleppo, Syria. Hedaya was raised in Bensonhurst. While a student at Tufts University, he began performing at the campus theater. He worked as a junior high school teacher for many years before deciding to pursue acting full-time. He studied acting at HB Studio in New York City.

== Career ==
Alongside a successful career in the movies, Hedaya has appeared in several TV roles, including Carla Tortelli's ex-husband Nick on the sitcom Cheers and its short-lived spinoff The Tortellis. He played the estranged father of Mallory Keaton's boyfriend, Nick, on the sitcom Family Ties. More recently, he played an Italian-American priest in the controversial and quickly cancelled NBC series The Book of Daniel. Adding to his list of television credits is his performance as the long-lost father of Adrian Monk on Monk. He also guest starred in 1997 and 2005 as a wisecracking lawyer on the medical drama ER.

In films, Hedaya has played the evil dictator and the secondary antagonist Arius in 1985's Commando and Mel Horowitz, the father of Alicia Silverstone's Cher, in the 1995 film Clueless. He played Julian Marty, a cuckolded husband who plots his wife's murder in the first Coen Brothers film, Blood Simple. His resemblance to Richard Nixon led to his being cast as the former president for the film Dick; he also played a supporting role in another film about the former president, Oliver Stone's Nixon, as Nixon's friend, Trini Cardoza. Hedaya appeared in several episodes of the television series Hill Street Blues as a corrupt, bigamist cop during the series' first season. During the 1980s Hedaya also appeared in the television series Miami Vice.

== Filmography ==
=== Film ===
Year	Title	Role	Notes
1970	Myra Breckinridge	Patient In Hospital Ward	Uncredited
1976	The Passover Plot	Yaocov	
1979	The Seduction of Joe Tynan	Alex Heller	
1980	Night of the Juggler	Sergeant Otis Barnes	
1981	True Confessions	Howard Terkel	
1982	I'm Dancing as Fast as I Can	Dr. Klein	
1982	Endangered Species	Peck	
1983	The Hunger	Lieutenant Allegrezza	
1984	Reckless	Peter Daniels	
1984	Blood Simple	Julian Marty	
1984	The Adventures of Buckaroo Banzai Across the 8th Dimension	John Gomez	
1984	Tightrope	Detective Molinari	
1985	Commando	General Ernesto Arius	
1986	A Smoky Mountain Christmas	Harry	
1986	Wise Guys	Anthony Castelo	
1986	Running Scared	Captain Logan	
1990	Joe Versus the Volcano	Frank Waturi	
1990	Tune in Tomorrow	Robert Quince	
1990	Pacific Heights	The Banker	
1991	The Addams Family	Tully Alford	
1991	Doubles	Lenny Bruce	
1992	Four Eyes and Six Guns	Lester Doom	
1993	Boiling Point	US Treasury Agent Sam Brady	
1993	Benny & Joon	Thomas	
1993	Rookie of the Year	Larry Fisher	
1993	Searching for Bobby Fischer	Tournament Director	
1993	For Love or Money	Gene Salvatore	
1993	Mr. Wonderful	Harvey	
1994	Maverick	Twitchy, Riverboat Poker Player	
1995	The Usual Suspects	Sergeant Jeff Rabin	
1995	To Die For	Joe Maretto	
1995	Clueless	Mel Horowitz	
1995	Fair Game	Walter Hollenbach	Uncredited
1995	Nixon	Trini Cardoza	
1996	Freeway	Detective Garnet Wallace	
1996	The First Wives Club	Morton 'Morty' Cushman	
1996	Ransom	Jackie Brown	
1996	Daylight	EMS Officer Frank Kraft	
1996	Marvin's Room	Bob	Nominated — Screen Actors Guild Award for Outstanding Performance by a Cast in a Motion Picture
1997	In & Out	Military Attorney	
1997	A Life Less Ordinary	Gabriel	
1997	Alien: Resurrection	General Martin Perez	
1998	A Night at the Roxbury	Kamehl Butabi	
1998	A Civil Action	John Riley	
1999	Dick	President Richard M. 'Dick' Nixon	
1999	The Hurricane	Sergeant Della Pesca, Paterson PD	
2000	Shaft	Detective Jack Roselli	
2000	The Crew	Mike 'The Brick' Donatelli	
2000	The Extreme Adventures of Super Dave	Gil Ruston	
2001	Down	Lieutenant McBain	
2001	Mulholland Drive	Vincenzo Castigliane	
2002	Quicksand	General Stewart	
2002	Swimfan	Coach Simkins	
2002	New Suit	Muster Hansau	
2003	American Cousins	Settimo	
2005	Strangers with Candy	Guy Blank	
2005	Robots	Mr. Gunk (voice)	
2005	Pizza My Heart	Vinnie Montebello	
2006	The Good Student	Gabrial	
2007	The Warrior Class	General Rand	
2010	The Extra Man	Aresh	
2012	The Normals	Ragnar	
2013	Clutter	Walter Bickford	
2014	The Humbling	Asa	
2016	Fantastic Beasts and Where to Find Them	'Red'	
2020	Funny Face	Benj	
2021	Slapface	Sheriff John Thurston	
2021	The God Committee	Granger	
2026	Influenced		

=== Television ===
Year	Title	Role	Notes
1975	Ryan's Hope	Herbie Towers	
1976	Kojak	Dan Hudson	Episode: "A Hair-Trigger Away"
1977	The Andros Targets	Prager	Episode: "The Treatment Succeeded But the Patient Died"
1977	The Prince of Central Park	Hot Dog Vendor	Television film
1978	The Last Tenant	Gabe	Television film
1979	Paris	Gil Davis	Episode: "Once More for Free"
1980	Death Penalty	Detective Ralph Corso	Television film
1981–1984	Hill Street Blues	Ralph MacAfee / A Bum	5 episodes
1982	CHiPs	Herzog	Episode: "Trained for Trouble"
1982	Report to Murphy	Unknown	Episode: "Pilot"
1984	St. Elsewhere	Joseph Keuhnelian	3 episodes
1984	The Dollmaker	Skyros	Television film
1984	Hot Pursuit	Unknown	Episode: "Goodbye... I Love You"
1984–1993	Cheers	Nick Tortelli	6 episodes
1984–1986	Miami Vice	Reuben Reydolfo / Ben Schroeder	Episodes: "One Eyed Jack" & "Payback"
1985	The Twilight Zone	Nick	Episode: Dealer's Choice
1986	Slow Burn	Simon Fleischer	Television film
1986	The Equalizer	Frank Donahue	Episode: "Unpunished Crimes"
1986	Courage	John Fosh	Television film
1986	That Secret Sunday	Captain Bates	Television film
1986	A Smoky Mountain Christmas	Harry	Television film
1987	The Tortellis	Nick Tortelli	13 episodes
1987–1988	Mama's Boy	Mickey	4 episodes
1988–1989	Family Ties	Joe Moore	2 episodes
1988–1990	L.A. Law	Michael Roitman	3 episodes
1989	Who's the Boss?	Ralph	Episode: "Men Are People, Too"
1989	One of the Boys	Ernie	6 episodes
1989	Double Your Pleasure	John	Television film
1990–1991	Equal Justice	Detective Al Perry	2 episodes
1991	Veronica Clare	Louis Benato	2 episodes
1993	Flying Blind	Employer #1	Episode: "Panic in Neil's Park"
1993	Based on an Untrue Story	Caprawolski	Television film
1993	NYPD Blue	Lou 'The Werewolf'	Episode: "NYPD Lou"
1993–1995	Fallen Angels	Detective Copernik / Auger / Johnny Ralls / Lieutenant Calender	4 episodes
1993–1997	Law & Order	Lieutenant Brian Torelli / Leslie Drake	2 episodes
1994	Another Midnight Run	Eddie Moscone	Television film
1994	Midnight Runaround	Eddie Moscone	Television film
1994	Midnight Run for Your Life	Eddie Moscone	Television film
1994	Because Mommy Works	Judge	Uncredited; television film
1995	Picture Windows	Carl	Episode: "Soir Bleu"
1996	The Home Court	Judge Walter Ragsdale	2 episodes
1997	The Second Civil War	Mel Burgess	Television film
1997	The Garden of Redemption	Captain Zito	Television film
1997	Homicide: Life on the Street	Leslie Drake	Episode: "Baby, It's You"
1997–2005	ER	Herb Spivak	4 episodes
1999	Locked in Silence	Dr. Rosenstock	Television film
2000	The Street	Randy Hoder	Episode: "High Yield Bonds"
2000	Judging Amy	Detective Tarnower	Episode: "Unnecessary Roughness"
2000–2003	Yes, Dear	Don Ludke	6 episodes
2003	Lucky	Joey 'Joey Legs'	3 episodes
2005	Pizza My Heart	Vinnie Montebello	Television film
2006	The Book of Daniel	Father Frank	4 episodes
2006	Monk	Jack Monk	Episode: "Mr. Monk Meets His Dad"
2008	Lipstick Jungle	Dimitri Pappademos	Episode: "Chapter Eleven: The F-Word"
2011	Too Big to Fail	Representative Barney Frank	Television film
2011	Person of Interest	Bernie Sullivan	Episode: "The Fix"
2013	Golden Boy	Francis Diaco	Episode: "Beast of Burden"
2014	Gotham	Detective Dix	2 episodes
2014–2015	The Mindy Project	Alan Castellano	2 episodes
2015	Last Week Tonight with John Oliver	Special Segment Actor	Episode: "Infrastructure"
2015–2019	Blue Bloods	Vincent Rella	4 episodes
2016	Odd Mom Out	Jill's Dad	Episode: "Fasting and Furious"
