= Long Live the Night =

2018 song by the Reklaws

Single by the Reklaws

from the album Freshman Year
- Released: February 16, 2018
- Genre: Country; country pop
- Length: 3:26 (song); 10:10 (EP)
- Label: Universal Canada
- Songwriter(s): Stuart Walker; Todd Clark; Travis Wood
- Producer(s): Todd Clark

The Reklaws singles chronology
"Hometown Kids" (2017)	"Long Live the Night" (2018)	"Feels Like That" (2018)

Music video
- "Long Live the Night" on YouTube

"Long Live the Night" (EP)
- EP cover

"Long Live the Night" is a song recorded by Canadian country duo the Reklaws. The track was co-written by duo member Stuart Walker with Travis Wood and the track's producer Todd Clark. The song was released on a three-track EP of the same name, and became the second single off the Reklaws' debut album Freshman Year.

== Critical reception ==
Sterling Whitaker of Taste of Country said the Reklaws "captured the perfect country party vibe" on "Long Live the Night". He stated: "Up-tempo acoustic guitar strumming underpins the track from the start, but the Reklaws fuse some fairly traditional elements with a contemporary sheen. All of it supports a singalong melody that is instantly addictive ear candy. The lyrics to "Long Live the Night" celebrate having a good time while you can, before the sun comes up." Building Our Own Nashville called the song "very anthemic country pop song with great vocals” that is "hard not to sing along with".

== Commercial performance ==
"Long Live the Night" was certified 2× Platinum by Music Canada on August 18, 2023, with over 160,000 sales. It reached a peak of #6 on the Billboard Canada Country chart dated June 30, 2018 becoming their first Top 10 hit. It also peaked at #25 on the Billboard Hot Canadian Digital Singles chart on December 18, 2018. According to Nielsen BDS, "Long Live the Night" was the second most-played song by a domestic artist on Canadian country radio in 2018 after James Barker Band's "Good Together".

== In popular culture ==
A modified version of "Long Live the Night" was made for the Canadian Football League and used as the theme song for the national TV broadcast Thursday Night Football on CFL on TSN in 2018 and 2019.

== Music video ==
The official music video for "Long Live the Night" premiered on May 17, 2018, and was directed by Ben Knechtel.

== Live performance ==
In November 2018, the Reklaws performed "Long Live the Night" at the kickoff show for the 106th Grey Cup in Edmonton. In August 2024, the Reklaws performed "Long Live the Night" while competing on season 19 of America's Got Talent during the quarterfinals stage.

== Track listings ==
Radio single

1. "Long Live the Night" – 3:26

Digital download - EP

1. "Long Live the Night" – 3:26
2. "Last Call" – 2:58
3. "Wish You Were Beer" – 3:46
  (feat. James Barker Band)

== Charts ==
Chart (2018)	Peak position
Canada Country (Billboard)	6
Canada Digital Songs (Billboard)	25

== Certifications ==
Region	Certification	Certified units/sales
Canada (Music Canada)	2× Platinum	160,000^{‡}
^{‡} Sales+streaming figures based on certification alone.
