= Midnight Runaround =

- Genre: Action; Comedy
- Based on: Characters by George Gallo
- Written by: Frank De Palma; Terry Borst; Jerrold E. Brown
- Directed by: Frank De Palma
- Starring: Christopher McDonald; Kyle Secor; Rebecca Cross; Ed O'Ross; Dan Hedaya; John Fleck
- Music by: Bennie Walace
- Country of origin: United States
- Original language: English

Production
- Producers: Tony To; Ellen Erwin
- Cinematography: Robert Draper
- Editors: Chip Masamitsu; Tim Tommasino
- Running time: 89 minutes

Original release
- Release: March 20, 1994

Related
- Midnight Run for Your Life

Midnight Runaround is a 1994 American made-for-television film, and the second in a series of television films produced for Universal Television's Action Pack programming block and based on the 1988 film Midnight Run. The sequel to Another Midnight Run, the film stars Christopher McDonald reprising his role as Jack Walsh. Midnight Runaround was followed by Midnight Run for Your Life.

== Cast ==
- Christopher McDonald as Jack Walsh
- Kyle Secor as Dale Adder
- Ed O'Ross as Marvin Dorfler
- John Fleck as Jerry Geisler
- Dan Hedaya as Eddie Moscone
- Rebecca Cross as Gina
- Tom McCleister as Hal Mooney
- Dick Miller as O'Doul
- Leon Russom as Sheriff Burton
- Beverly Leech as Reba
- Jeff Doucette as Orvis
- Gary Grubbs as Lester

== Filming locations ==
- Los Angeles, California
- Sperry, Oklahoma
