= Middle Men (film) =

2009 American black comedy-drama film

- Theatrical poster
- Directed by: George Gallo
- Written by: George Gallo; Andy Weiss
- Produced by: Christopher Mallick; William Sherak; Jason Shuman; Michael Weiss
- Starring: Luke Wilson; Giovanni Ribisi; Gabriel Macht; James Caan
- Cinematography: Lukas Ettlin
- Edited by: Malcolm Campbell
- Music by: Brian Tyler
- Production companies: Oxymoron Entertainment; Mallick Media; Blue Star Entertainment
- Distributed by: Paramount Pictures (through Paramount Vantage)
- Release dates: May 17, 2009 (Cannes); August 6, 2010 (United States)
- Running time: 105 minutes
- Country: United States
- Language: English
- Budget: $20 million
- Box office: $754,301

Middle Men is a 2009 American black comedy-drama film directed by George Gallo and written by Gallo and Andy Weiss. It is based on the experiences of Christopher Mallick, who was previously associated with the internet billing company Epoch and was the founder of ePassporte. Mallick was accused of stealing millions of dollars from his customers at ePassporte to fund the film's development. It stars Luke Wilson, Giovanni Ribisi, Gabriel Macht and James Caan.

== Plot ==
In 2004 Houston, Jack Harris leaves home with several million dollars in a duffel bag, to pay Russian mobsters. Harris is worried about the safety of his wife Diana and their children.

Flashback to 1997 in Los Angeles, where Jack helps a sick friend managing a nightclub. Nearby, Wayne Beering and Buck Dolby are best friends renting together. The drug-addicted friends are watching porn movie reels when Wayne asks why there is no porn on the internet. Buck, a former NASA scientist, takes 15 minutes to create a program to allow online credit card transactions to charge people for looking at dirty pictures on their website. They quickly earn thousands of dollars. Needing more porn content they approach Nikita Sokoloff, a Russian mob boss who owns a local strip club; Sokoloff agrees to 25% of their business in return for letting them photograph and film his strippers.

Within a month Buck and Wayne's website is hugely successful. They party in Las Vegas while neglecting payments to Sokoloff. Jack has made the LA nightclub a success and attracts the attention of Jerry Haggerty, a crooked lawyer hired by Wayne and Buck to sort out their problem with Sokoloff. Jack meets the friends and becomes a partner in the business, paying Haggerty $200,000 to get out, knowing Haggerty is under federal indictment and thus a threat to the business.

Sokoloff's nephew comes to collect his $400,000 profit, but when he threatens to kill Jack's family, one of Jack's body guards punches him so hard that he falls dead. Jack and his partners dump the body in the ocean and fabricate a story that Sokoloff's nephew took the money and ran. Sokoloff is skeptical, but agrees to let it pass in return for an increase to 50% of the partnership.

Jack expands the business by dropping their porn site and focusing on the online credit card billing services. They create a billing company called "24/7 billing.com", becoming the titular Middle Men for other internet-based porn providers. The billing business is making hundreds of millions of dollars within a year. Jack becomes addicted to the money, sex and power of his new L.A. lifestyle, spends little time with his Houston family and starts a relationship with porn star Audrey Dawns.

Haggerty, bitter that Jack cut him out of a multimillion dollar partnership, schemes to take over the company. He easily manipulates the foolish Wayne and Buck to work with Denny Z, providing billing services for Denny's numerous child pornography websites.

Audrey's live stream porn site is watched by an international web of terrorists, which the US Government uses to track and arrest or kill the terrorists. The FBI asks for Jack and Audrey's help to expand their terrorist hunt, but Wayne and Buck fear that Jack is meeting with the FBI to turn them in for the murder of Sokoloff's nephew and the child porn. The two confide in Haggerty about killing Sokoloff's nephew, which Haggerty uses to incite Sokoloff to make a move on Jack.

Jack's life is further complicated when Sokoloff's men kidnap his maid's son, who they believe is Jack's son. Jack gathers up several million dollars and goes to meet Sokoloff, as seen at the start of the film.

Jack is told that the boy will be released if he signs a contract giving his partnership share to Wayne, Buck, Sokoloff, and Haggerty. Jack signs the agreement but backdates it to before Denny Z's child porn business was added. Sokoloff shoots Haggerty dead but lets Jack go as thanks for all the money he has made him.

Jack's FBI friend charges Sokoloff, Wayne and Buck with providing billing services for child porn. They turn states evidence against Denny Z for a reduced sentence. Sokoloff flees the country and is alleged to be in Moscow. Jack and the maid's son return home, where Diane welcomes Jack back into their family.

== Cast ==
- Luke Wilson as Jack Harris
- Giovanni Ribisi as Wayne Beering
- Gabriel Macht as Buck Dolby
- James Caan as Jerry Haggerty
- Jacinda Barrett as Diana Harris
- Kevin Pollak as FBI Agent Curt Allmans
- Laura Ramsey as Audrey Dawns
- Rade Šerbedžija as Nikita Sokoloff
- Claudia Jordan as Cynthia
- Terry Crews as James
- Kelsey Grammer as District Attorney Frank Griffin
- John Ashton as Morgan

== Release ==
Middle Men was released on August 6, 2010.

The first official theatrical trailer for the film was released on June 16, 2010.

A red band trailer was released on July 10, 2010.

A long take sequence taking place at an orgy was cut from the film. The scene's inclusion would have pushed the film from an R rating to an NC-17 rating. The scene was subsequently leaked to adult video clip website Pornhub. It was subsequently included on the home-video release.

== Reception ==
The film received mixed reviews. On the review aggregator website Rotten Tomatoes, 39% of 51 critics' reviews are positive, with an average rating of 5.6/10. The website's consensus reads: "Middle Men benefits from a solid cast, particularly Luke Wilson, but its muddled script lets them down." Metacritic, which uses a weighted average, assigned the film a score of 60 out of 100, based on 20 critics, indicating "mixed or average" reviews.

The film grossed only $754,301 at the box office during its three-week run. The budget was $20 million.

== Home media ==
Middle Men was released on Blu-ray and DVD on February 8, 2011.

== Music ==
Two soundtrack albums were released, both on August 3, 2010: Middle Men: Original Motion Picture Score, composed by Brian Tyler, and Middle Men: Original Motion Picture Soundtrack, collecting songs used in the film.

Score

All tracks are written by Brian Tyler.

| No. | Title | Length |
|---|---|---|
| 1. | "My Name Is Jack Harris" | 1:46 |
| 2. | "Middle Men" | 2:21 |
| 3. | "Tightrope" | 2:42 |
| 4. | "Wayne And Buck" | 2:09 |
| 5. | "Broken" | 4:07 |
| 6. | "Down The Rabbit Hole" | 2:47 |
| 7. | "Boat Ride" | 2:23 |
| 8. | "Back To LA" | 1:42 |
| 9. | "Aimless Electricity Upon Touching" | 4:30 |
| 10. | "Paranoia" | 2:11 |
| 11. | "Friendly Warning" | 3:22 |
| 12. | "Guilt" | 3:29 |
| 13. | "Trouble" | 1:57 |
| 14. | "FBI" | 2:55 |
| 15. | "Alejandro" | 2:30 |
| 16. | "Full Circle" | 2:36 |
| 17. | "Middle Men Finale" | 3:07 |

Soundtrack

| No. | Title | Writer(s) | Artist(s) | Length |
|---|---|---|---|---|
| 1. | "Who Do You Love?" (cover of Bo Diddley, 1956; released 1978) | Ellas McDaniel | George Thorogood | 4:20 |
| 2. | "You Make My Dreams" (1981) | Sara Allen, Daryl Hall, John Oates | Hall & Oates | 3:10 |
| 3. | "Honey" (1998) | Moby, Bessie Jones | Moby | 3:28 |
| 4. | "Sympathy for the Devil" (1968) | Jagger/Richards | The Rolling Stones | 6:17 |
| 5. | "How Bizarre" (1995) | Alan Jansson, Pauly Fuemana | OMC | 3:44 |
| 6. | "Oye Como Va" (1963) | Puente | Tito Puente | 5:49 |
| 7. | "Buona Sera" (1956) | Carl Sigman, Peter DeRose | Louis Prima | 3:00 |
| 8. | "Sweet Dreams (of You)" (cover of Don Gibson, 1956; released 1963) | Don Gibson | Patsy Cline | 2:33 |
| 9. | "Everybody Wants to Rule the World" (1985) | Roland Orzabal, Ian Stanley, Chris Hughes | Tears for Fears | 4:09 |
| 10. | "Freeze Frame" (1982) | Seth Justman, Peter Wolf | J. Geils Band | 3:56 |
| 11. | "Bodyrock" (1999) | Moby | Moby | 3:35 |
| 12. | "You Can't Always Get What You Want" (1969) | Jagger/Richards | The Rolling Stones | 7:28 |
| 13. | "The Way You Move" (2003) | Big Boi, Carl-Mo, Sleepy Brown | Outkast (featuring Sleepy Brown) | 3:54 |
| 14. | "California Love (Remix)" (1995) | Joe Cocker, Woodrow Cunningham, Norman Durham, Mikel Hooks, Ronald Hudson, Christopher Stainton, Larry Troutman, Roger Troutman | 2Pac (featuring Dr. Dre & Roger Troutman) | 6:23 |
| 15. | "24-7" | Tyler | Brian Tyler | 5:58 |
| 16. | "Middle Men Suite" | Tyler | Brian Tyler | 5:56 |
