= Vincent Guastaferro =

American film, stage and television actor

- Born: April 6, 1950 (age 76); Jersey City, New Jersey, U.S.
- Education: University of Toledo; The Theatre School at DePaul University
- Occupation: Actor
- Years active: 1979–present

Vincent Guastaferro (born April 6, 1950) is an American film, stage and television actor. He is known for playing the recurring role of Sgt. Vincent Agostini in the American police procedural television series NYPD Blue.

== Life and career ==
Guastaferro was born in Jersey City, New Jersey, He attended the University of Toledo, earning his BFA degree. He also attended The Theatre School at DePaul University, earning MFA degree. He began his stage career in 1979, first appearing on the stage production of Sexual Perversity in Chicago, where he served as the replacement of actor Jim Belushi.

During his stage career, Guastaferro made numerous appearances to playwright, filmmaker and author David Mamet's stage plays. In 1980, he made his screen debut, appearing in the drama television series Lou Grant. He then made an appearance to the 1981 film King of the Mountain, playing a gang member. He guest-starred in television programs including Home Improvement, Becker, What's Happening Now!!, Hardcastle and McCormick, CSI: NY, Melrose Place, Hunter, The West Wing and Brooklyn South. He played the recurring role of John Kousakis in the crime drama television series Wiseguy, and from 1993 to 1997, he played the recurring role of Sgt. Vincent Agostini in NYPD Blue. In 1997, he played the role of Joey's friend in the stage play The Old Neighborhood.

In his film career, Guastaferro played the role of Deputy Rick Cologne in the 1986 film Friday the 13th Part VI: Jason Lives. He then played Paulie in the 1989 film Next of Kin. He appeared in films such as Things Change, Eyes of an Angel, Touch Me, Nothing in Common, State and Main, and Trouble Bound. He played the role of Lt. Senna in the 1991 film Homicide. He appeared in the 2009 documentary film His Name Was Jason: 30 Years of Friday the 13th, and the 2013 documentary film Crystal Lake Memories: The Complete History of Friday the 13th. His final film credit was from the 2012 film An Old Man’s Gold. He reprised his role as Rick Cologne in the fan films Never Hike in the Snow (2020) and Never Hike Alone 2 (2023).
