= Midnight Run =

1988 film by Martin Brest

- Theatrical release poster
- Directed by: Martin Brest
- Written by: George Gallo
- Produced by: Martin Brest
- Starring: Robert De Niro; Charles Grodin; Yaphet Kotto; John Ashton; Dennis Farina; Joe Pantoliano
- Cinematography: Donald E. Thorin
- Edited by: Chris Lebenzon; Michael Tronick; Billy Weber
- Music by: Danny Elfman
- Production company: City Light Films
- Distributed by: Universal Pictures
- Release date: July 20, 1988
- Running time: 126 minutes
- Country: United States
- Language: English
- Budget: $30 million
- Box office: $81.6 million

Midnight Run is a 1988 American action-comedy thriller film directed by Martin Brest from a screenplay by George Gallo. It stars Robert De Niro, Charles Grodin, Yaphet Kotto, John Ashton, Dennis Farina, and Joe Pantoliano. In the film, bounty hunter Jack Walsh (De Niro) attempts to take accountant Jonathan Mardukas (Grodin), who is wanted by mob bosses and the FBI, from New York City to Los Angeles.

Midnight Run was initially developed by Gallo, who worked with Brest to revise the screenplay. De Niro was the first to be cast, seeking to star in a comedy and play against type from his crime and gangster film roles during the 1970s and 1980s. Paramount Pictures, which distributed Brest's previous film, Beverly Hills Cop (1984), was set to act as Midnight Run's distributor but backed out after casting disagreements with Brest. Universal Pictures picked up the project. Principal photography took place between 1987 and 1988, with filming locations including New York, Los Angeles, Arizona, and New Zealand.

Midnight Run was theatrically released in the United States on July 20, 1988, by Universal Pictures. It grossed $81.6 million worldwide and received positive reviews from critics, with praise for its humor and the performances and chemistry between De Niro and Grodin. It was nominated for Best Motion Picture – Musical or Comedy and Best Actor (for De Niro) at the 46th Golden Globe Awards. Midnight Run inspired The Midnight Run Action Pack (1994) television film standalone sequels, which did not feature De Niro or Grodin.

== Plot ==
Bounty hunter Jack Walsh is enlisted by bail bondsman Eddie Moscone to find accountant Jonathan Mardukas and bring him to Los Angeles. Mardukas embezzled $15 million from Chicago mob boss Jimmy Serrano and donated it to charity before jumping on the $450,000 bail that Moscone posted for him. Moscone offers Walsh $50,000 to bring Mardukas back within five days. Walsh asks for $100,000 despite Moscone's assurance that the job is easy, a "midnight run". Walsh is approached by FBI Special Agent Alonzo Mosely, who needs Mardukas to testify against Serrano. Mosely orders Walsh to stay away from Mardukas. Walsh ignores Mosely's order and pockets Mosely's ID, which he uses to pose as an FBI agent during his journey. Serrano's henchmen offer Walsh $1 million to give them Mardukas, but Walsh declines.

Walsh locates and captures Mardukas in New York City and calls Moscone from the airport, unaware that Moscone's line is tapped by the FBI and that his assistant, Jerry, is secretly tipping off Serrano's men. Mardukas tells Walsh that he has a fear of flying; Walsh does not believe Mardukas until they get on the plane and Mardukas fakes a panic attack, forcing them to travel by train. When they fail to show up in Los Angeles that night, Moscone sends bounty hunter Marvin Dorfler, a rival of Walsh's, to find them.

Dorfler finds the pair in Pittsburgh and attempts to take Mardukas from Walsh, but Walsh gets advance notice and leaves the train with Mardukas. Walsh attempts to purchase bus tickets with his credit card, but discovers that Dorfler has canceled it. Without funds, Walsh is forced to rely on other means to get across the country, including stealing cars, taking a bus in Fremont, Ohio, and hitchhiking from Amarillo, Texas.

Meanwhile, Mosely leads a task force to find Walsh and Mardukas after hearing of the skirmish on the train. While alone with Mardukas, Walsh reveals that ten years ago, he worked as an undercover police officer in Chicago, trying to get close to a drug dealer who had nearly the entire department on his payroll. As Walsh was about to bust the dealer, corrupt cops planted heroin in his house. To avoid either going to prison or working for the dealer, Walsh resigned from the force and became a bounty hunter. His wife divorced him and married a corrupt police lieutenant (now a captain); he has seen neither her nor their daughter in nine years.

Soon, Mardukas learns that the drug dealer was Serrano. In Sedona, Arizona, Dorfler steals Mardukas from Walsh, who is then found by Mosely. While arguing with Moscone on the phone, Walsh realizes that Dorfler intends to give Mardukas to Serrano. But Dorfler inadvertently reveals Mardukas's location to Serrano's men. They knock him unconscious and retrieve Mardukas.

Walsh convinces Serrano that he has computer disks Mardukas created with enough information to convict Serrano and arranges to give them to Serrano in exchange for Mardukas. He then makes a deal with Mosely to deliver Serrano to the FBI in exchange for being allowed to bring Mardukas to Los Angeles and immunity from prosecution for impersonating an FBI agent. Walsh meets Serrano while wearing a wire and being watched by the FBI. Dorfler spots Mardukas and interrupts the exchange, unwittingly disabling the wire. Serrano grabs the disks from Walsh, and the FBI agents surround and arrest him and his henchmen. As agreed, Mosely gives Walsh his bounty.

When Walsh and Mardukas arrive in Los Angeles, Walsh, knowing that Serrano's incarcerated associates will kill Mardukas in prison, lets him go. Before parting, Walsh gives Mardukas a watch his ex-wife gave him before their marriage. Mardukas gives Walsh $300,000 in a money belt he is wearing, and says, "It's not a payoff; it's a gift. You already let me go." Mardukas says goodbye and abruptly leaves. Walsh hails a taxi and asks the driver if he has change for a $1,000 bill. The driver scoffs and drives away. Walsh begins walking home.

== Cast ==
- Robert De Niro as Jack Walsh
- Charles Grodin as Jonathan Mardukas
- Yaphet Kotto as Alonzo Mosely
- John Ashton as Marvin Dorfler
- Dennis Farina as Jimmy Serrano
- Joe Pantoliano as Eddie Moscone
- Richard Foronjy as Tony Darvo
- Robert Miranda as Joey
- Jack Kehoe as Jerry Geisler
- Tracey Walter as Diner counter man
- Wendy Phillips as Gail
- Danielle DuClos as Denise
- Philip Baker Hall as Sidney

== Production ==
After completing The Untouchables, De Niro wanted to try something different and decided on comedy. He pursued the lead role in Penny Marshall's film Big. Marshall was interested, but the studio was not, so the role went to Tom Hanks. Martin Brest, who had directed Beverly Hills Cop, had developed a script with George Gallo that blended elements of comedy and action.

Gallo said he based the relationship between Walsh and Mardukas on his own parents. "I don't think they ever realized how funny they were when they were arguing about something", he said. "My father was very emotional whereas my mother was far more calculating. She would let him talk and lead him down alleys and then strike like a cat."

Of Brest, Gallo said, "Marty was highly focused, where I was a bit more all over the place. I'm not a person who suffers from not having ideas. If anything, I have too many ideas. Marty helped rein me in to stay focused on the main story. This has helped me a great deal since my collaboration with him."

Paramount Pictures was originally interested in backing Midnight Run, but wanted a big star opposite De Niro to improve the film's chances at the box office. Its executives suggested the Mardukas character be changed to a woman, and suggested Cher in the hope that she would provide some "sexual overtones". When Brest rejected the idea, Paramount suggested teaming De Niro with Robin Williams, who became eager to get the role and offered to audition for Brest. Bruce Willis was also mentioned as a possible co-star.

Brest was impressed by Grodin's audition with De Niro, feeling real chemistry between them. As a result, Paramount backed out, and its United International Pictures partner Universal Pictures became interested in the project. Paramount president Ned Tanen said that the budget became too high. Universal executive Casey Silver had worked with Brest on Beverly Hills Cop and was integral in setting up the project at Universal.

To research his role, De Niro worked with real-life bounty hunters and police officers. As Walsh uncuffs Mardukas on the train, the latter says, "Thanks, 'cause they're starting to cut into my wrists". In fact, Grodin had permanent scars from the handcuffs he wore for most of the film. The scene in which Mardukas falls off of a cliff was shot on location in the Salt River Canyon in the White Mountains of Arizona. The conclusion of the scene, which takes place in river rapids, was shot in New Zealand because the water was "too cold in Arizona".

"I trusted Marty would choose the material that was most suited for the scene", De Niro said. "He's aware of everything in Chuck's style, in my style. He had to balance all that, and I think he did it very well."

Universal invested $15 million in a print and television advertising campaign.

== Soundtrack ==
The film's score is by Danny Elfman, and the album was released by MCA Records.

1. "Walsh Gets the Duke" – 1:47
2. "Main Titles" – 2:21
3. "Stairway Chase" – 0:54
4. "J.W. Gets a Plan" – 1:41
5. "Gears Spin I" – 0:54
6. "Dorfler's Theme" – 1:24
7. "F.B.I." – 1:16
8. "Package Deal" – 1:07
9. "Mobocopter" – 2:42
10. "Freight Train Hop" – 1:18
11. "Drive to Red's" – 1:04
12. "In the Next Life" – 1:06
13. "The River" – 1:19
14. "The Wild Ride" – 1:31
15. "Amarillo Dawn" – 0:26
16. "Potato Walk" – 1:09
17. "Desert Run" – 1:09
18. "Diner Blues" – 1:19
19. "Dorfler's Problem" – 1:01
20. "Gears Spin II" – 1:30
21. "The Confrontation" – 2:30
22. "The Longest Walk" – 1:32
23. "Walsh Frees the Duke" – 2:44
24. End Credits: "Try to Believe" (Performed by Mosley & The B-Men) – 4:16

Note: The version of "Try to Believe" in the film is instrumental. The track was re-recorded by Oingo Boingo for its 1990 album Dark at the End of the Tunnel.

== Reception ==
=== Box office ===
Midnight Run was released on July 20, 1988, in 1,158 theaters, grossing $5.5 million in its opening weekend. It went on to make $38.4 million in North America and $43.2 million in the rest of the world, for a worldwide total of $81.6 million.

=== Critical response ===
On Rotten Tomatoes, the film holds an approval rating of 95%, based on 58 reviews, with an average rating of 8.00/10. The site's critics consensus reads: "Enlivened by the antagonistic chemistry between Robert De Niro and Charles Grodin, Midnight Run is an uncommonly entertaining odd couple comedy." Metacritic assigned the film a weighted average score of 78 out of 100, based on 16 critics, indicating "generally favorable" reviews. Audiences polled by CinemaScore gave the film an average grade of "A" on a scale of A+ to F.

Film critic Roger Ebert of the Chicago Sun-Times gave the film 3½ stars out of 4, writing, "What Midnight Run does with these two characters is astonishing, because it's accomplished within the structure of a comic thriller ... It's rare for a thriller to end with a scene of genuinely moving intimacy, but this one does, and it earns it."

In his review for The Globe and Mail, Jay Scott praised the performances: "De Niro has the time of his acting life lightening up and sending up all those raging bulls that won him all those Oscars...Grodin, master of the double-take and maestro of the slow burn, [is] the best light character comic since Jack Benny stopped playing himself."

For The New York Times, Vincent Canby wrote, "Mr. De Niro and Mr. Grodin are lunatic delights."

For The Washington Post, Hal Hinson wrote, "carrying the dead weight of George Gallo's script, Brest isn't up to the strenuous task of transforming his uninspired genre material in something deeper, and so the attempts to mix pathos with comedy strike us merely as wild and disorienting vacillations in tone."

== Legacy ==
Thirty years on, some critics have warmed to the movie. For the film's 30th anniversary, Alan Sepinwall, who has repeatedly called Midnight Run his favorite movie, wrote for Rolling Stone:

All that ultimately matters—and makes the movie a classic worth revisiting on the 30th anniversary of its release—are two other words: Walsh and Duke.

Gallo credited the movie's success to the relationship between Walsh and Mardukas:

In many ways it is a love story, although it is one that is short-lived. They meet each other, take an instant dislike to one another and over time grow to respect each other which leads to deeper feelings. Both men realize, despite their differences, that they share core beliefs of what is right and wrong. Audiences also think that the road trip angle to the story rings true. Everyone who has ever gone on a long road trip knows that things can go wrong and, as a result, adults can be reduced to behaving like children. No matter how well a script is written, it has to be fully realized by the director and actors. Every last person working on the film did a terrific job.

De Niro attributed much of the film's success to Grodin. "The way Chuck Grodin is, it worked", he said. "His character was irritating and Chuck knew how to do that, to work that. I felt like that was a good way to go."

== Sequels ==
=== Film ===
On November 8, 2021, it was announced that Universal Pictures was developing a sequel starring Regina Hall, with De Niro attached as a producer.

=== Television ===
- Another Midnight Run
- Midnight Runaround
- Midnight Run for Your Life

== See also ==
- List of American films of 1988
