= 2021 Canadian Country Music Awards =

Music awards ceremony in Canada

- Date: November 29, 2021
- Venue: Budweiser Gardens; London, Ontario
- Hosted by: Lindsay Ell, Priyanka

Television/radio coverage
- Network: Global

The 2021 Canadian Country Music Awards, honouring achievements in Canadian country music in 2021, were presented November 29, 2021, at Budweiser Gardens in London, Ontario. Hosted by Lindsay Ell and Priyanka, the ceremony was presented in-person, although due to the COVID-19 pandemic in Canada the venue maintained vaccination and social distancing mandates. The top winner of the night was Dallas Smith, who won three awards.

The event was webcast live on the Global Television Network's streaming app and Amazon Prime Video, with a repeat broadcast on Global's terrestrial television stations on December 3.

Nominations were announced on September 22, 2021.

== Nominees and winners ==
=== Music ===
Entertainer of the Year	Album of the Year
Dallas Smith; Dean Brody; Brett Kissel; MacKenzie Porter; The Reklaws	Tenille Townes, The Lemonade Stand; Lindsay Ell, Heart Theory; Brett Kissel, What Is Life?; Tyler Joe Miller, Sometimes I Don't, But Sometimes I Do; Jess Moskaluke, The Demos; Dallas Smith, Timeless
Male Artist of the Year	Female Artist of the Year
Dallas Smith; Dean Brody; Jade Eagleson; Brett Kissel; Tyler Joe Miller	Tenille Townes; Tenille Arts; Lindsay Ell; Jess Moskaluke; MacKenzie Porter
Group or Duo of the Year	Interactive Artist or Group of the Year
The Reklaws; High Valley; Hunter Brothers; Tim and the Glory Boys; The Washboard Union	Lindsay Ell; Aaron Goodvin; James Barker Band; Nice Horse; The Reklaws
Rising Star	Fan Choice
Robyn Ottolini; Shawn Austin; Andrew Hyatt; Tyler Joe Miller; Tim and the Glory Boys	Brett Kissel; Tenille Arts; Dean Brody; Jade Eagleson; High Valley; Tyler Joe Miller; MacKenzie Porter; The Reklaws; Dallas Smith; Tenille Townes
Alternative Country Album of the Year	Single of the Year
Corb Lund, Agricultural Tragic; Ryan Lindsay, The Ride; Cory Marks, Who I Am; Callie McCullough, After Midnight; Donovan Woods, Without People	Dallas Smith, "Like a Man"; Dean Brody and The Reklaws, "Can’t Help Myself"; Tim Hicks, "No Truck Song"; High Valley, "Grew Up On That"; The Reklaws, "Where I'm From"
Songwriter of the Year	Video of the Year
Patricia Conroy, Ester Dean, Andrew DeRoberts, Dave Haywood, Charles Kelley, Shane McAnally, Madeline Merlo, Tina Parol, Hillary Scott, Ryan Tedder, Dave Thomson - "Champagne Night" (Lady A); Marc Beeson, Daniel Tashian, Tenille Townes - "Come As You Are" (Tenille Townes); Aaron Goodvin, Ed Hill, Jimmy Ritchey - "Every Time You Take Your Time" (Aaron Goodvin); Lindsay Ell, Sam Ellis, Micah Premnath - "Good on You" (Lindsay Ell); Zach Abend, Jess Moskaluke, Liz Rose - "Mapdot" (Jess Moskaluke)	Brett Kissel, "Make a Life, Not a Living"; Lindsay Ell, "Want Me Back"; Hunter Brothers, "Hard Dirt"; Jess Moskaluke, "Mapdot"; MacKenzie Porter, "Drinkin' Songs"
Top Selling Canadian Album of the Year	Top Selling Canadian Single of the Year
Dallas Smith, Timeless	Dean Brody and The Reklaws, "Can't Help Myself"
Drummer of the Year	Fiddle Player of the Year
Matthew Atkins; Ben Bradley; Spencer Cheyne; Brendan Lyons; Greg Williamson	Tyler Vollrath; Linsey Beckett; Tyler Beckett; Denis Dufresne
Specialty Instrument Player of the Year
Mitch Jay; Denis Dufresne; Connor Riddell

=== Radio ===
Music Director of the Year, Large Market	Music Director of the Year, Medium/Small Market
Amanda Kingsland – CKBY-FM; Dayna Bourgoin – CKKL-FM; Stephanie Dunham – CISN-FM/CKRY-FM; A.J. Keller – CFCW; Peter Walker – CJKX-FM/CHKX-FM	Paul Ferguson – CHCQ-FM; Shilo Bellis – CJXL-FM; Lance Doll – CHAT-FM; Mike Sadavoy – CHSJ-FM; Barry Stewart – CFWC-FM
Radio Station of the Year, Large Market	Radio Station of the Year, Medium/Small Market
CFCW (Edmonton, AB); CHKX-FM (Hamilton, ON); CJJR-FM (Vancouver, BC); CKKL-FM (Ottawa, ON); CKRY-FM (Calgary, AB)	CHCQ-FM (Belleville, ON); CKGY-FM (Red Deer, AB); CHSJ-FM (Saint John, NB); CICX-FM (Orillia, ON); CILG-FM (Moose Jaw, SK)
Radio Personality of the Year
Jennifer Campbell – CIKZ-FM; Shannon Ella – Pure Country; Jason McCoy – Pure Country; Paul McGuire – Stingray Music; Greg Shannon, Stella Stevens – CFCW

=== Industry ===
Booking Agency of the Year	Country Music Program or Special of the year
Sakamoto Agency; The Feldman Agency; Invictus Entertainment Group; Livestar Entertainment Canada; Paquin Artists Agency	Brett Kissel: Live at the Drive-In; Christmas Time with Tenille Townes; Gord Bamford’s Real Country Livin’ Father’s Day Special; Paul McGuire’s Country Countdown; The Road Less Travelled
Management Company of the Year	Music Publishing Company of the Year
MDM Artist Management Services; Big Loud Management; Jayward Artist Group; On Ramp Entertainment; Starseed Entertainment	Warner Chappell Music Canada; Anthem Entertainment; Big Loud Publishing; BMG Rights Management (Canada) Inc.; Sony / ATV Music Publishing
Record Company of the Year	Industry Person of the Year
Warner Music Canada; Big Loud Records; MDM Recordings; Sony Music Entertainment (Canada); Universal Music Canada	Brianne Deslippe, Big Loud Records; Steve Coady, Warner Music Canada; Warren Copnick, Sony Music Entertainment (Canada); Mike Denney, MDM Recordings; Anya Wilson, Anya Wilson Promotion
Creative Director(s) of the Year	Recording Studio of the Year
Bronwin Parks, Emma-Lee (The Washboard Union, Everbound, Stage Banner); Stephane Lamontagne, Matt Lang, Denis Desro, Carl Lessard (Matt Lang, Socials and Ad Material); Ben Dartnell, Brett Kissel, Erica Perreaux (Brett Kissel, Single package for "Make a Life, Not a Living"); Antoine Moonen (Jess Moskaluke, Socials and Promotional Graphics for The Demos); Shae Dupuy, Ceci Mula (Shae Dupuy, Single: "Selfish", Music Video, Social and Promotional Material)	MCC Recording Studio; Barrytone Studios; Noble Street Studios; OCL Studios; Revolution Recording
Record Producer of the Year	Retailer of the Year
Danick Dupelle - Tyler Joe Miller, Sometimes I Don't, But Sometimes I Do; Danick Dupelle and Tebey Ottoh - Tebey, The Good Ones; Jesse Frasure, Brett Kissel and Bart McKay - Brett Kissel, What Is Life?; Karen Kosowski, Thomas Salter and Gordie Sampson - The Washboard Union, Everbound; Joey Moi and Dave Cohen - Dallas Smith, Timeless	Apple Music; Amazon Music; Spotify Canada
Talent Buyer or Promoter of the Year	Video Director of the Year
Paul Biro – Sakamoto Agency; Jim Cressman – Invictus Entertainment Group; Rob Cyrynowski – Livestar Entertainment Canada/Hotels Live Canada; Brooke Dunford – Republic Live; Adam Oppenheim – Stampede Entertainment Inc.	Stephano Barberis - Dallas Smith, "Classic" and "Some Things Never Change"; Gord Bamford, "Diamonds in a Whiskey Glass"; The Washboard Union, "If She Only Knew" and "Never Run Outta Road"; Ben Knechtel - Jade Eagleson, "All Night to Figure It Out" and "Close"; Robyn Ottolini, "F-150"; The Reklaws, "Not Gonna Not" and "Where I'm From"; Travis Nesbitt - Dan Davidson, "No Last Call" and "Role Models"; The Road Hammers, "The Boys Are Back At It"; Tim and the Glory Boys, "Without a Prayer"; Carl Sheldon - Tyler Joe Miller, "Fighting" and "I Would Be Over Me Too"; Brandi Sidoryk and Krista Wodelet - Nice Horse, "High School" and "Ugly Christmas Sweater"
