= List of number-one country singles of 2020 (Canada) =

Canada Country was a chart published weekly by Billboard magazine.

This 50-position chart lists the most popular country music songs, calculated weekly by airplay on 46 country music stations across the country as monitored by Nielsen BDS. Songs are ranked by total plays. As with most other Billboard charts, the Canada Country chart features a rule for when a song enters recurrent rotation. A song is declared recurrent if it has been on the chart longer than 30 weeks and is lower than number 20 in rank.

These are the Canadian number-one country singles of 2020, per the BDS Canada Country Airplay chart.

Issue date	Country Song	Artist	Ref.
January 4	"10,000 Hours"	Dan + Shay and Justin Bieber	
January 11	"Heartache Medication"	Jon Pardi	
January 18	"10,000 Hours"	Dan + Shay and Justin Bieber	
January 25	"Drink About Me"	Brett Kissel	
February 1	"Jersey on the Wall (I'm Just Asking)"	Tenille Townes	
February 8	"The Bones"	Maren Morris	
February 15	"The Bones"	Maren Morris	
February 22	"We Back"	Jason Aldean	
February 29	"Timeless"	Dallas Smith	
March 7	"The Bones"	Maren Morris	
March 14	"Country Girls"	Jess Moskaluke	
March 21	"Lucky"	Jade Eagleson	
March 28	"Homemade"	Jake Owen	
April 4	"Chasin' You"	Morgan Wallen	
April 11	"Chasin' You"	Morgan Wallen	
April 18	"Beer Can't Fix"	Thomas Rhett featuring Jon Pardi	
April 25	"Beer Can't Fix"	Thomas Rhett featuring Jon Pardi	
May 2	"Does to Me"	Luke Combs featuring Eric Church	
May 9	"Does to Me"	Luke Combs featuring Eric Church	
May 16	"Pillow Talkin'"	Tyler Joe Miller	
May 23	"Nobody But You"	Blake Shelton and Gwen Stefani	
May 30	"I Hope You're Happy Now"	Carly Pearce and Lee Brice	
June 6	"Can't Help Myself"	Dean Brody and The Reklaws	
June 13	"Here and Now"	Kenny Chesney	
June 20	"Here and Now"	Kenny Chesney	
June 27	"Bluebird"	Miranda Lambert	
July 4	"No Truck Song"	Tim Hicks	
July 11	"One Margarita"	Luke Bryan	
July 18	"One Margarita"	Luke Bryan	
July 25	"Seeing Other People"	MacKenzie Porter	
August 1	"One Big Country Song"	LoCash	
August 8	"I Love My Country"	Florida Georgia Line	
August 15	"Grew Up On That"	High Valley	
August 22	"Like a Man"	Dallas Smith	
August 29	"One Night Standards"	Ashley McBryde	
September 5	"Lovin' on You"	Luke Combs	
September 12	"Lovin' on You"	Luke Combs	
September 19	"One of Them Girls"	Lee Brice	
September 26	"Canadian Summer"	Dean Brody	
October 3	"One of Them Girls"	Lee Brice	
October 10	"Got What I Got"	Jason Aldean	
October 17	"One Beer"	Hardy featuring Lauren Alaina and Devin Dawson	
October 24	"One Beer"	Hardy featuring Lauren Alaina and Devin Dawson	
October 31	"I Would Be Over Me Too"	Tyler Joe Miller	
November 7	"More Than My Hometown"	Morgan Wallen	
November 14	"More Than My Hometown"	Morgan Wallen	
November 21	"Happy Anywhere"	Blake Shelton featuring Gwen Stefani	
November 28	"Ain't Always the Cowboy"	Jon Pardi	
December 5	"Ain't Always the Cowboy"	Jon Pardi	
December 12	"Want Me Back"	Lindsay Ell	
December 19	"Big, Big Plans"	Chris Lane	
December 26	"Champagne Night"	Lady A	

== See also ==
- 2020 in country music
- List of Billboard number-one country songs of 2020
