= Light Up the Night (Jess Moskaluke album) =

Studio album by Jess Moskaluke
- Released: April 15, 2014
- Genre: Country
- Length: 32:01
- Label: MDM Recordings
- Producer: Corey Crowder

Jess Moskaluke chronology
Catch Me If You Can (2012)	Light Up the Night (2014)	Kiss Me Quiet (2015)

Singles from Light Up the Night
- 1. "Good Lovin'" Released: October 2013; 2. "Cheap Wine and Cigarettes" Released: March 18, 2014; 3. "Used" Released: September 1, 2014; 4. "Night We Won't Forget" Released: January 30, 2015

Light Up the Night is the debut studio album by Canadian country music artist Jess Moskaluke. It was released on April 15, 2014 via MDM Recordings. The album was preceded by the singles "Good Lovin'" and "Cheap Wine and Cigarettes". Moskaluke released a line of lip gloss the same week as the album.

== Track listing ==
No.	Title	Writer(s)	Length
1.	"Good Lovin'"	Laura Bell Bundy, Erin Enderlin, Jerry Flowers	3:03
2.	"Cheap Wine and Cigarettes"	Cary Barlowe, Hillary Lindsey	2:43
3.	"Used"	Corey Crowder, Alex Kline, Steve Pasch	3:49
4.	"Light Up the Night"	Crowder, Kline, Jess Moskaluke	3:22
5.	"Strong as It's Ever Been"	Crowder, Kline, Daisy Mallory	3:20
6.	"Show You Crazy"	Kline, Moskaluke, Kirk Sauers	3:01
7.	"Night We Won't Forget"	Crowder, Cale Dodds, Moskaluke	3:34
8.	"Never Better"	Jason "Slim" Gambill, Tebey Ottoh, George Teren	3:24
9.	"No Show"	Moskaluke	2:51
10.	"When He's Drunk"	Megan Conner, Crowder, Dodds	2:54
Total length:			32:01

== Chart performance ==
=== Singles ===
Year	Single	Peak chart positions	
Year	Single	CAN Country	CAN
2013	"Good Lovin'"	17	—
2014	"Cheap Wine and Cigarettes"	11	48
2014	"Used"	13	—
2015	"Night We Won't Forget"	17	—
"—" denotes releases that did not chart
