= Good Lovin' (Jess Moskaluke song) =

Single by Jess Moskaluke

from the album Light Up the Night
- Released: October 15, 2013
- Genre: Country
- Length: 3:03
- Label: MDM Recordings
- Songwriter(s): Laura Bell Bundy; Erin Enderlin; Jerry Flowers
- Producer(s): Corey Crowder

Jess Moskaluke singles chronology
"Everything Falls" (2013)	"Good Lovin'" (2013)	"Cheap Wine and Cigarettes" (2014)

"Good Lovin'" is a song recorded by Canadian country music singer Jess Moskaluke for her debut studio album, Light Up the Night (2014). It was written by Laura Bell Bundy, Erin Enderlin, and Jerry Flowers. "Good Lovin'" was released October 15, 2013 as the album's lead single. The song was Moskaluke's first top 20 single on the Canada Country chart.

== Promotion ==
Moskaluke uploaded a lyric video for the song to her official YouTube channel on November 4, 2013.

== Accolades ==
"Good Lovin'" won the award for Song of the Year at the 2014 Saskatchewan Country Music Awards.

== Charts ==
Chart (2013–14)	Peak position
Canada Country (Billboard)	17

== Release history ==
Country	Date	Format	Label	Ref.
Canada	October 15, 2013	Country radio	MDM Recordings	
Worldwide	October 15, 2013	Digital download	MDM Recordings	
