= Catch Me If You Can (disambiguation) =

Catch Me If You Can is a 2002 film directed by Steven Spielberg.

Catch Me If You Can may also refer to:

- Catch Me If You Can (book), by Frank Abagnale, the basis of the 2002 film

== Film and stage ==
- Catch Me If You Can (musical), a musical adaptation of the 2002 film
- Catch Me If You Can, a 1959 film directed by Don Weis
- Catch Me If You Can (play), a 1965 stage play by Willie Gilbert and Jack Weinstock
- Catch Me If You Can (1989 film), written and directed by Stephen Sommers

== Music ==
- Catch Me If You Can, the debut album of UK rapper Bashy
- Catch Me If You Can (soundtrack), the original soundtrack of the 2002 film
- Catch Me If You Can, the soundtrack of the 1989 film; see the Tangerine Dream discography
- Catch Me If You Can (EP), the debut extended play by Canadian singer Jess Moskaluke; or its title track
- "Catch Me If You Can", a song by Ana Johnsson, from the album Little Angel
- "Catch Me If You Can", a song by M. Pokora, from the album MP3
- "Catch Me If You Can," a song by Angela Via on the soundtrack album Pokémon: The First Movie
- "Catch Me If You Can" (song), a 2015 single by Girls' Generation
- "Catch Me If You Can", a song by Gym Class Heroes on the album The Quilt
- "Catch Me If You Can", a song by Burnham
- "Catch Me If You Can", a song by Jacqueline Emerson
- "Catch Me If You Can", a song by Babymetal on the album Babymetal
- "Catch Me If You Can", a song from Sonic Riders and Sonic Riders: Zero Gravity
- "Catch Me If You Can", a song by Eden as a bonus track on the album End Credits
- "Catch Me If You Can", a song written by Brendan Shine
- “Catch Me If You Can”, a song by Millionaires (group) featuring Jeffree Star
- "Catch Me If You Can", a song from the 2014 Indian film The Xposé
- "Catch Me If You Can", a song by KSI
- "Catch Me If You Can", a song by Eric Clapton on the album Another Ticket

== Other uses ==
- "Catch Me If You Can", a television episode in the list of Good Luck Charlie episodes
- "Catch Me If You Can", a 2014 episode of the Indian TV series of Best of Luck Nikki (an adaptation of Good Luck Charlie)
- "Catch Me If You Can" (The Vampire Diaries), a 2013 episode of the television series The Vampire Diaries
- "Catch Me If You Can" is a song from the second season of Soy Luna
- Catch Me If You Can, an American radio quiz program later retitled Hit the Jackpot
- Catch Me If You Can (game show), an unofficial Russian adaptation of I Can See Your Voice
- "Catch Me If You Can", a song from the second season of Kally's Mashup

== See also ==
- Catch Us If You Can (disambiguation)
- "Catch 'Em If You Can", a 2004 Simpsons episode
- Catch Me Who Can, a steam locomotive (1808)
