= Leave Each Other Alone =

2021 single by Jess Moskaluke

Single by Jess Moskaluke featuring Travis Collins

from the album The Demos
- Released: May 7, 2021
- Genre: Country
- Length: 3:44
- Label: MDM; UMA
- Songwriter(s): Jess Moskaluke; Zach Abend; Trannie Anderson
- Producer(s): Corey Crowder

Jess Moskaluke singles chronology
| "Mapdot" (2020) | "Leave Each Other Alone" (2021) | "Nothin' I Don't Love About You" (2021) |

Music video
- "Leave Each Other Alone" on YouTube

Alternative cover

"Leave Each Other Alone" is a song co-written and recorded by Canadian country artist Jess Moskaluke. The song features Australian country artist Travis Collins, and was co-written with Zach Abend and Trannie Anderson. It was the fourth single from Moskaluke's 2021 studio album The Demos.

== Background ==
Moskaluke originally wrote the track as a solo song, but felt it could be a duet. She felt she did not know who could deliver the energy she wanted on the song until she was introduced to Travis Collins on a promotional trip to Australia. She said once she heard "his incredible voice", she knew she wanted him to feature on the song. Collins said he "loved this song before the first chorus even hit my ears" and he knew he wanted to be part of it.

== Critical reception ==
Nanci Dagg of Canadian Beats Media called the track "outstanding" and "upbeat", saying the "extraordinary blend of their voices on this tune is like pairing together a smooth wine with a buttery cheese". The Music Express referred to "Leave Each Other Alone" as a "stunning duet". Chet Daniels of WJVL described the song as a "passionate love story of two people that can’t get enough of one another". Country Town named the track its "Song of the Day".

== Commercial performance ==
"Leave Each Other Alone" reached a peak of number 35 on the Billboard Canada Country chart, marking Moskaluke's lowest peak since 2013, after the song's radio support was dropped in favour of her next single "Nothin' I Don't Love About You" in late July 2021. It also peaked at number 29 on the TMN Country Hot 50 in Australia.

== Music video ==
The official music video was for "Leave Each Other Alone" premiered on May 17, 2021.

== Charts ==
| Chart (2021) | Peak position |
|---|---|
| Australia Country Hot 50 (TMN) | 29 |
| Canada Country (Billboard) | 35 |
