= Nobody Roads =

2025 single by Josh Stumpf

Single by Josh Stumpf

from the EP Two-Lane Testimony
- Released: September 19, 2025
- Genre: Country rock
- Length: 3:30
- Label: MDM
- Songwriters: Josh Stumpf; Dave Thomson; Patricia Conroy; Mitch Merrett
- Producer: Dave Thomson

Josh Stumpf singles chronology
"Highway Money" (2025)	"Nobody Roads" (2025)

"Nobody Roads" is a song recorded by Canadian country music artist Josh Stumpf. He wrote the song with Dave Thomson, Patricia Conroy, and Mitch Merrett, while Thomson produced the track. It is the first song of Stumpf's career to chart on the all-genre Canadian Hot 100.

== Background ==
Stumpf wrote the song with his co-writers during his first trip to Nashville, which was also his first trip outside of Canada. He described the inspiration for the song as driving "out to a dirt road in the middle of nowhere to clear my head and work through things. It's a place where no one can find you; you can kick up some dust, blow off steam, and just breathe without judgment or causing any trouble".

The song is the follow-up single to Stumpf's first top ten hit "Highway Money".

== Critical reception ==
Heather Taylor-Singh of Billboard Canada opined that Stumpf "delivers an emotional performance that feels both controlled and heartfelt" and described his vocals as "raw and earnest". Scott Roos of North Sask Music Zine gave the song an "A" rating, describing it as a "hit" that is "professionally executed, emotionally grounded, and resonant in a way that feels earned".

== Charts ==
Weekly chart performance for "Nobody Roads"
Chart (2026)	Peak position
Canada (Canadian Hot 100)	81
Canada Country (Billboard)	7
