= Knock Off (song) =

2022 single by Jess Moskaluke

Single by Jess Moskaluke

from the EP Heartbreaker
- Released: July 8, 2022
- Genre: Country
- Length: 3:04
- Label: MDM Recordings
- Songwriter(s): Jess Moskaluke; Corey Crowder; Jade Eagleson
- Producer(s): Corey Crowder

Jess Moskaluke singles chronology
"Nothin' I Don't Love About You" (2021)	"Knock Off" (2022)	"Heartbreaker" (2023)

Music video
- "Knock Off" on YouTube

"Knock Off" is a song co-written and recorded by Canadian country music artist Jess Moskaluke. She wrote the song with fellow country artist Jade Eagleson and producer Corey Crowder.

== Background and release ==
"Knock Off" was released in July 2022. Moskaluke stated that with each song she writes, she always wants to stay "authentic to my sound and who I am", adding that she never wants "two songs to sound the same". For "Knock Off", she aimed to take influence from some of the 1990s country artists that inspired her including Faith Hill, Shania Twain, Martina McBride, and Terri Clark. Later in September 2022, Mosklauke released an acoustic version of the song.

== Critical reception ==
Patrick Johannes of Nash in Tune favourably reviewed the track, saying that it "will get listeners off their seats and dancing" with "swinging, sorta throwback guitars and a fun drum machine beat". He compared Moskaluke's voice to that of Carrie Underwood, adding that if Moskaluke is eying a spot on the American country music charts, then "Knock Off" "has the fire and [vigour] to do just that". Channel R stated that Moskaluke "finds her new sound in an ode to the 90s Nashville country music that first inspired her". Matt Ryan of Meadow Lake Now said that the song "is a bold step in a new sonic direction that evolves [Moskaluke's] sound as she continues to build momentum in her career and development as one of Canada’s top female country acts".

== Music video ==
The official music video for "Knock Off" was directed by Travis Nesbitt and was primarily filmed in Camrose, Alberta. It premiered on Countrytown in Australia on August 16, 2022. Moskaluke stated that she "wanted to stray from the direct lyrical narrative of the song for this video", adding that she found it "important to highlight the message that you are one of a kind, and completely irreplaceable".

== Track listings ==
Digital download – single

1. "Knock Off" – 3:04

Digital download – single

1. "Knock Off" (Acoustic) – 3:02

Digital download – single

1. "Knock Off" (Dan Davidson & Ari Rhodes Dance Remix) – 2:48

== Charts ==
Chart performance for "Knock Off"
Chart (2022)	Peak position
Australia Country Hot 50 (The Music)	8
Canada Country (Billboard)	6
