= Crazy Enough (Bobby Wills album) =

Studio album by Bobby Wills
- Released: June 24, 2014
- Genre: Country
- Length: 35:37
- Label: MDM Recordings
- Producer: Michael Pyle

Bobby Wills chronology
If It Was That Easy (2012)	Crazy Enough (2014)	Tougher Than Love (2016)

Singles from Crazy Enough
- 1. "Crazy Enough" Released: February 2014; 2. "Never Didn't Love You" Released: June 2014; 3. "Undressed" Released: October 2014; 4. "So Much for Taking It Slow" Released: April 2015

Professional ratings
Review scores
Source	Rating
Top Country	5/5 stars

Crazy Enough is the third studio album by Canadian country music artist Bobby Wills. It was released on June 24, 2014, via MDM Recordings and distributed by Universal Music Canada. The album includes the singles "Crazy Enough" and "Never Didn't Love You".

== Critical reception ==
Shenieka Russell-Metcalf of Top Country gave the album five stars out of five, calling it "the definition of great country music" and writing that "his voice, range and lyrical versatility is the real deal."

== Track listing ==
All tracks are written by Walt Aldridge, Michael Pyle, Bobby Wills except "Undressed" by Bobby Wills And Patricia Conroy.

No.	Title	Length
1.	"Still Something There"	3:29
2.	"All Kinds of Wrong"	3:27
3.	"That's Where You Come In"	3:32
4.	"Crazy Enough"	3:50
5.	"That's Why I Pray"	3:23
6.	"Undressed (featuring Patricia Conroy)"	3:29
7.	"Never Didn't Love You"	3:13
8.	"The End of the Day"	3:18
9.	"So Much for Taking It Slow"	3:28
10.	"With You"	4:28
Total length:		35:37

== Chart performance ==
=== Singles ===
Year	Single	Peak chart positions	
Year	Single	CAN Country	CAN
2014	"Crazy Enough"	13	76
2014	"Never Didn't Love You"	14	75
2014	"Undressed"	13	—
2015	"So Much for Taking It Slow"	38	—
"—" denotes releases that did not chart
