= Tougher Than Love (EP) =

EP by Bobby Wills
- Released: March 18, 2016
- Recorded: 2015–16 (Calgary, AB and Nashville, TN)
- Genre: Country
- Length: 21:44
- Label: MDM Recordings
- Producer: Michael Pyle

Bobby Wills chronology
Crazy Enough (2014)	Tougher Than Love (2016)	In Comes the Night (2017)

Singles from Tougher Than Love
- 1. "Won't You Be Mine" Released: October 9, 2015; 2. "Down by the River" Released: March 29, 2016; 3. "Tougher Than Love" Released: September 28, 2016

Tougher Than Love is the debut extended play recorded by Canadian country music artist Bobby Wills, released through MDM Recordings Inc. on March 18, 2016. It includes the singles "Won't You Be Mine", "Down by the River", and "Tougher Than Love", the first two of which reached the top 10 on the Billboard Canada Country airplay chart. Wills co-wrote all six tracks.

== Singles ==
"Won't You Be Mine" was released to digital retailers on October 9, 2015. It officially impacted Canadian country radio on October 28, 2015. The song debuted on the Canada Country chart dated November 14, 2015 and reached a peak position of 9 on the chart dated February 20, 2016 in its fifteenth week.

The second single, "Down by the River", was serviced to Canadian and American country radio stations on March 29, 2016. It entered the Canada Country chart at number 45 in April 2016 and reached a peak position of 9 in its twelfth week, on the chart dated July 16, 2016.

"Tougher Than Love" was released to radio as the EP's third single on September 28, 2016. It debuted at number 47 on the Canada Country chart dated October 15, 2016, and has so far reached a peak position of 11.

== Critical reception ==
Mike Bell of the Calgary Herald wrote that the record is "very much a complete and well-crafted album," despite comprising only six songs. He also said that, while the collection is "stylistically... all over the map," it is tied together by "Wills's steady voice and likable personality."

=== Accolades ===
Tougher Than Love was nominated for Album of the Year at the 2016 Canadian Country Music Association Awards. "Won't You Be Mine" was nominated for Single of the Year at the same awards ceremony, with Wills also receiving a nomination for the song in the category of Songwriter of the Year. He lost all three awards.

== Track listing ==
No.	Title	Writer(s)	Length
1.	"30,000 Feet"	Wade Kirby; Michael Pyle; Bobby Wills	3:28
2.	"Down by the River"	Kirby; Phil O'Donnell; Pyle; Wills	3:45
3.	"Won't You Be Mine"	Matt Craig Johnson; Pyle; Wills	3:37
4.	"Tougher Than Love"	Walt Aldridge; Pyle; Wills	3:33
5.	"If It Ain't Broke"	Patricia Conroy; Wills	3:17
6.	"You Lose Me There"	Michael Curtis; Pyle; Wills	4:04
Total length:			21:44

== Chart performance ==
=== Singles ===
Year	Single	Peak positions
Year	Single	CAN Country
2015	"Won't You Be Mine"	9
2016	"Down by the River"	9
2016	"Tougher Than Love"	11
"—" denotes releases that did not chart
