= Sometimes I Don't, But Sometimes I Do =

EP by Tyler Joe Miller
- Released: November 6, 2020
- Genre: Country
- Length: 20:39
- Label: MDM Recordings
- Producer: Danick Dupelle

Tyler Joe Miller chronology
Sometimes I Don't, But Sometimes I Do (2020)	The Band's Packed Up (2023)

Singles from Sometimes I Don't, But Sometimes I Do
- 1. "Pillow Talkin'" Released: December 25, 2019; 2. "I Would Be Over Me Too" Released: June 5, 2020; 3. "Fighting" Released: December 25, 2020; 4. "Sometimes I Do" Released: June 15, 2021

Sometimes I Don't, But Sometimes I Do is the debut extended play by Canadian country music singer Tyler Joe Miller. It was released on November 6, 2020 through MDM Recordings. It includes the number-one singles "Pillow Talkin'" and "I Would Be Over Me Too", as well as the top-10 singles "Fighting", and "Sometimes I Do".

== Track listing ==
Sometimes I Do, But Sometimes I Don't track listing
No.	Title	Writer(s)	Length
1.	"Sometimes I Do"	Tyler Joe Miller; Dan Swinimer; Jeffrey Darren Johnson; Mitch Merrett	3:23
2.	"I Would Be Over Me Too"	Miller; Merrett; Kelly Archer	3:20
3.	"Fighting"	Miller; Swinimer; Dave Faber; Wes Mack	3:49
4.	"You'd Really Hate Me Now"	Archer; Blake Chaffin; Brett Tyler	3:09
5.	"Maybe It's Me"	Miller; Swinimer; Faber; Mack	3:55
6.	"Pillow Talkin'"	Archer; Chaffin; Tyler	3:20
Total length:			20:39

== Charts ==
=== Singles ===
Year	Single	Peak positions		Certifications
Year	Single	CAN Country	CAN	Certifications
2019	"Pillow Talkin'"	1	70	MC: Gold
2020	"I Would Be Over Me Too"	1	63	MC: Gold
2020	"Fighting"	8	85	
2021	"Sometimes I Do"	5	86	

== Awards and nominations ==
Year	Association	Category	Nominated work	Result	Ref.
2019	British Columbia Country Music Association	Single of the Year	"Pillow Talkin'"	Won	
2021	Canadian Country Music Association	Album of the Year	Sometimes I Don't, But Sometimes I Do	Nominated	
2022	British Columbia Country Music Association	Album of the Year	Sometimes I Don't, But Sometimes I Do	Won	
2022	British Columbia Country Music Association	Single of the Year	"Sometimes I Do"	Won	

== Release history ==
Release formats for Sometimes I Don't, But Sometimes I Do
Country	Date	Format	Label	Ref.
Various	November 6, 2020	Digital download; streaming	MDM	
Various	2022	Compact disc	MDM	
