= Heartbreaker (Jess Moskaluke song) =

2023 single by Jess Moskaluke

Single by Jess Moskaluke

from the EP Heartbreaker
- Released: May 12, 2023
- Genre: Country
- Length: 3:24
- Label: MDM
- Songwriter(s): Jess Moskaluke; Corey Crowder; Emily Shackelton
- Producer(s): Corey Crowder

Jess Moskaluke singles chronology
"Knock Off" (2022)	"Heartbreaker" (2023)	"Go Get Er" (2023)

Music video
- "Heartbreaker" on YouTube

"Heartbreaker" is a song co-written and recorded by Canadian country music artist Jess Moskaluke. She wrote the song with Corey Crowder and Emily Shackelton, while Crowder produced the track.

== Background ==
Moskaluke stated that "Heartbreaker" is a direction that she had not "explored yet both in the music and the lyrics," as she had "written many songs about the heartbreak of a woman," but not about the "heartbreak of a man". She added that when writing the song with Corey Crowder and Emily Shackelton, they "tried to embody the sense of longing that comes along with falling for someone emotionally broken from a previous relationship".

== Critical reception ==
Nanci Dagg of Canadian Beats Media stated that "Heartbreaker" provides "an evolved and dynamic country sound" for Moskaluke, noting her "big voice, pop-infused hooks, and sonic versatility".

== Music video ==
The official music video for "Heartbreaker" premiered on YouTube on March 11, 2022, and was directed by Andrew Freedom Parry. Moskaluke wears three different outfits throughout the video, which she intended to represent different types of love: "fun, carefree, passionate, and sometimes dreamy".

== Charts ==
Chart performance for "Heartbreaker"
Chart (2023)	Peak position
Australia Country Hot 50 (The Music)	30
Canada Country (Billboard)	10
