= Halfway Home (song) =

2020 single by Jess Moskaluke

Single by Jess Moskaluke

from the album The Demos
- Released: April 10, 2020
- Genre: Country pop
- Length: 3:31
- Label: MDM; UMA
- Songwriter(s): Jess Moskaluke; Joseph Fox; Olivia Richardson; Michael Whitworth
- Producer(s): Corey Crowder

Jess Moskaluke singles chronology
| "Country Girls" (2019) | "Halfway Home" (2020) | "Mapdot" (2020) |

Music video
- "Halfway Home" on YouTube

"Halfway Home" is a song co-written and recorded by Canadian country artist Jess Moskaluke. The song was co-written with Joseph Fox, Olivia Richardson, and Michael Whitworth, while Corey Crowder produced it. It was the second single from Moskaluke's 2021 studio album The Demos.

== Background ==
Moskaluke described the track as "a song about being so in love you can’t stand the thought of being apart". She wrote the track several years prior to its release, and performed it live on several occasions with fans often requesting its official release.

== Music video ==
The official music video was for "Halfway Home" premiered on April 14, 2020. The video showcases concert footage, as well as a behind-the-scenes look at Moskaluke and her band's touring life. She stated that she thought the video "captured the essence of who my band and I are both onstage and off".

== Credits and personnel ==
Credits adapted from AllMusic.

- Jess Moskaluke – lead vocals, songwriting
- Adam Ayan – master engineering
- Corey Crowder — production, recording
- Warren David – mixing
- Joseph Fox - songwriting
- Alyson McAnally – production
- Dan Mikesell – mixing
- Sean Moffitt – mixing
- Olivia Richardson – songwriting
- Michael Whitworth – songwriting

== Charts ==
"Halfway Home" reached a peak of #11 on the Billboard Canada Country chart, marking Moskaluke's thirteenth Top 20 hit. It also reached a peak of #4 on the TMN Country Hot 50 in Australia.

| Chart (2020) | Peak position |
|---|---|
| Australia Country Hot 50 (TMN) | 4 |
| Canada Country (Billboard) | 11 |
