= Sometimes I Do =

2021 single by Tyler Joe Miller

Single by Tyler Joe Miller

from the EP Sometimes I Don't, But Sometimes I Do
- Released: June 15, 2021
- Genre: Country
- Length: 3:23
- Label: MDM
- Songwriter(s): Tyler Joe Miller; Dan Swinimer; Jeffrey Darren Johnson; Mitch Merrett
- Producer(s): Danick Dupelle

Tyler Joe Miller singles chronology
"Fighting" (2020)	"Sometimes I Do" (2021)	"Wild as Her" (2022)

Music video
- "Sometimes I Do" on YouTube

"Sometimes I Do" is a song co-written and recorded by Canadian country artist Tyler Joe Miller. The song was co-written with Dan Swinimer, Jeffrey Darren Johnson, and Mitch Merrett. It was the fourth single off his debut extended play Sometimes I Don't, But Sometimes I Do.

== Background ==
Miller said that the song was a "blast to write", adding "It’s about how you can’t really put me in a box. Sometimes I’m up to no good and get into a little bit of trouble and sometimes I’m as innocent as can be just havin’ a good time".

== Music video ==
The official music video for "Sometimes I Do" premiered on October 19, 2021.

== Accolades ==
Year	Association	Category	Result	Ref
2022	British Columbia Country Music Association	Single of the Year	Won	

== Chart performance ==
"Sometimes I Do" peaked at number five on the Canada Country chart for the week of November 20, 2021, marking Miller's fourth consecutive top ten hit to start his radio career. It also reached a peak of number 86 on the Canadian Hot 100 during the same week.

Chart performance for "Sometimes I Do"
Chart (2021)	Peak position
Canada (Canadian Hot 100)	86
Canada Country (Billboard)	5
