= Past the Past =

EP by Jess Moskaluke
- Released: November 3, 2017
- Genre: Country pop
- Length: 21:51
- Label: MDM Recordings
- Producer: Corey Crowder

Jess Moskaluke chronology
Kiss Me Quiet (2015)	Past the Past (2017)	The Demos (2021)

Singles from Past the Past
- 1. "Drive Me Away" Released: February 14, 2017; 2. "Kill Your Love" Released: June 23, 2017; 3. "Past the Past" Released: February 2, 2018; 4. "Camouflage" Released: June 1, 2018; 5. "Save Some of That Whiskey" Released: December 25, 2018

Past the Past is the third extended play recorded by Canadian country pop artist Jess Moskaluke. It was released through MDM Recordings Inc. on November 3, 2017. The EP was preceded by the singles "Drive Me Away" and "Kill Your Love", with the former becoming Moskaluke's highest charting single to date and the first top-five country single by a solo female Canadian artist since 2008. Past the Past become Moskaluke's first release to enter the Canadian Albums Chart, peaking at 87.

== Singles ==
"Drive Me Away" was released to Canadian country radio as the EP's lead single on February 14, 2017. The song was released digitally the following day. In May 2017, "Drive Me Away" reached number 3 on the Canada Country chart, surpassing her previous career-best position of 7. This also made Moskaluke the first solo female artist to reach the top five at Canadian country radio since Terri Clark topped the chart in 2008 with "In My Next Life".

On June 23, 2017, "Kill Your Love" was released as the album's second single. The song reached a peak of 16 on the Canadian country chart.

The title track, "Past the Past, was released to radio February 2, 2018 as the EP's third single. Peaking at number 30, it became Moskaluke's lowest-charting single since "Hit N Run" in 2013.

"Camouflage" was released as the fourth single on June 1, 2018. It would peak at number seven on Canada Country, returning Moskaluke to the top ten.

"Save Some of That Whiskey" was released as the fifth and final single on December 25, 2018. It reached a peak of number six.

== Critical reception ==
Marlo Ashley of Exclaim! rated the EP seven-out-of-ten, writing that it "is genre-defying, pushing boundaries by taking new country into more alternative territory" and that the collection "encourages many replays, and should reach audiences from dance to pop-rock and country-pop; it's irresistible."

== Track listing ==
No.	Title	Writer(s)	Length
1.	"Drive Me Away"	Jess Moskaluke; Zach Abend; Corey Crowder	2:53
2.	"Camoflauge"	Moskaluke; Kelly Archer; Lindsay Rimes; Emily Shackelton	2:47
3.	"Right When Ya Left"	Moskaluke; Crowder; Neil Mason	3:02
4.	"Gotta Start Somewhere"	Moskaluke; Abend; Emily Landis	3:16
5.	"Kill Your Love"	Ashley Monroe; Liz Rose; Caitlyn Smith	3:29
6.	"Save Some of That Whiskey"	Moskaluke; Crowder; Jared Mullins	2:53
7.	"Past the Past"	Hannah Ellis; Sam Ellis	3:31
Total length:			21:51

== Chart performance ==
=== Album ===
Chart (2017)	Peak position
Canadian Albums (Billboard)	87

=== Singles ===
Year	Single	Peak chart positions
Year	Single	CAN Country
2017	"Drive Me Away"	3
2017	"Kill Your Love"	16
2018	"Past the Past"	30
2018	"Camouflage"	7
2018	"Save Some of That Whiskey"	6
