= Ryan Lindsay =

Ryan Lindsay may refer to:

- Ryan Lindsay (soccer) (born 2001), Canadian soccer player
- Ryan Lindsay (ice hockey), Canadian ice hockey player
- Ryan Lindsay (singer), Canadian country music singer
