= Kiss Me Quiet =

EP by Jess Moskaluke
- Released: September 25, 2015
- Genre: Country
- Length: 24:41
- Label: MDM Recordings
- Producer: Corey Crowder

Jess Moskaluke chronology
Light Up the Night (2014)	Kiss Me Quiet (2015)	Past the Past (2017)

Singles from Kiss Me Quiet
- 1. "Kiss Me Quiet" Released: August 28, 2015; 2. "Take Me Home" Released: February 2, 2016; 3. "Elevator" Released: July 5, 2016

Kiss Me Quiet is the second extended play by Canadian country music artist Jess Moskaluke. It was released on September 25, 2015, via MDM Recordings. It include the singles "Kiss Me Quiet", "Take Me Home", and "Elevator". Kiss Me Quiet won the award for Country Album of the Year at the 2017 Juno Awards.

== Track listing ==
No.	Title	Writer(s)	Length
1.	"Kiss Me Quiet"	Kelly Archer, Corey Crowder, Emily Shackelton	2:53
2.	"Elevator"	Phil Barton, Crowder, Jess Moskaluke	2:42
3.	"Speed of Night"	Crowder, Alex Kline, Moskaluke	2:51
4.	"Take Me Home"	Archer, Moskaluke, Shackelton	3:11
5.	"Lightning Bolt"	Blair Daly, Hillary Lindsey, Troy Verges	3:40
6.	"Good for You"	Crowder, Cale Dodds, Moskaluke	3:00
7.	"Kiss Me Quiet" (acoustic version)	Archer, Crowder, Shackelton	2:50
8.	"Lightning Bolt" (acoustic version)	Daly, Lindsey, Verges	3:34
Total length:			24:41

== Chart performance ==
=== Singles ===
Year	Single	Peak positions
Year	Single	CAN Country
2015	"Kiss Me Quiet"	7
2016	"Take Me Home"	7
2016	"Elevator"	15
