= Then There's You =

Then There's You may refer to:

- "Then There's You", a song performed by The Wilkinsons, released on Nothing but Love, 1998
- "Then There's You", a song by Charlie Puth from Nine Track Mind, 2016
- "Then There's You", a song by Day26 from Forever in a Day, 2009
- "Then There's You", a song by David James from If I Were You, 2020
- "Then There's You", a song by Dean Brody from Right Round Here, 2023
