= Drive Me Away =

Single by Jess Moskaluke

from the album Past the Past
- Released: February 14, 2017
- Genre: Country pop
- Length: 2:53
- Label: MDM Recordings
- Songwriter(s): Zach Abend; Corey Crowder; Jess Moskaluke
- Producer(s): Corey Crowder

Jess Moskaluke singles chronology
"Elevator" (2016)	"Drive Me Away" (2017)	"Kill Your Love" (2017)

"Drive Me Away" is a song recorded by Canadian country music singer Jess Moskaluke for her third extended play, Past the Past (2017). Moskaluke co-wrote the song with Zach Abend and the record's producer, Corey Crowder. It was released to Canadian country radio via MDM Recordings Inc. on February 14, 2017 and to digital retailers worldwide the following day.

"Drive Me Away" reached number three on the Canada Country chart in May 2017, becoming the first single by a solo female Canadian artist to enter the top five at country radio since Terri Clark's "In My Next Life" in 2008.

== Critical reception ==
Nanci Degg of Canadian Beats wrote that the song is "catchy, upbeat and addictive" and the kind of single that "you want to listen to over and over again."

== Chart performance ==
"Drive Me Away" debuted at number 41 on the Canada Country chart dated March 11, 2017. It has since reached a peak position of 3 on the chart dated May 20, 2017, making it her highest-charting single to date. With this position, Moskaluke earned the distinction of being the first solo female artist to place a single in the top five at Canadian country radio in nine years, since Terri Clark hit number one with "In My Next Life" in 2008.

== Music video ==
An accompanying music video for the song was filmed in Toronto, Ontario in early 2017. The video premiered on CMT Canada on March 10, 2017.

== Charts ==
Chart (2017)	Peak position
Canada Country (Billboard)	3

== Release history ==
Country	Date	Format	Label	Ref.
Canada	February 14, 2017	Country radio	MDM Recordings	
Worldwide	February 15, 2017	Digital download	MDM Recordings	
