= Leaving Thomas =

- Origin: Calgary, Alberta, Canada
- Genres: Country, country pop
- Years active: 2014–2020
- Labels: MDM Recordings
- Past members: Annika Odegard; Bryton Udy
- Website: https://leavingthomas.com/

Leaving Thomas was a Canadian country music duo composed of Annika Odegard and Bryton Udy from Calgary, Alberta. The group was formed in 2012 and signed a record deal with MDM Recordings Inc. in 2016. They have released one extended play and one studio album. The duo's first radio single, "Waiting Kind of Girl", reached the top 40 on the national country chart.

== Life and career ==
Singer-songwriters Annika Odegard and Bryton Udy first met in 2002 when they both contributed to a children's chorus for a local production of Joseph and the Amazing Technicolor Dreamcoat. They reconnected in 2012 as contestants the 2012 Calgary Stampede Talent Search, in which Odegard won the grand prize and Udy was proclaimed the "most promising performer". The two become friends and began working on music together. Prior to forming Leaving Thomas, Odegard performed as a piano bar entertainer and placed eleventh on the fifth season of Canadian Idol in 2007, while Udy released a solo album and finished as the first runner-up in the 2013 vocal competition, Nashville North. In 2016, they self-released an acoustic extended play titled The Ground Floor.

=== 2016-2020: Leaving Thomas and Nothing Comes for Free ===
The duo signed a 3-year recording contract with MDM Recordings Inc. in November 2016. Their debut single, "Waiting Kind of Girl", was released to radio on December 25, 2016. It peaked at number 33 on the Canada Country airplay chart. Two more singles were released in 2017 - "Best Adventure" and "Blame It on the Neon" - with the latter becoming the duo's first top 20 hit. All three singles were included on their self-titled extended play, which was released in January 2018.

"Kiss About It" was released as a single in June 2018, but failed to chart at country radio. After a brief hiatus, the duo released their first studio album, Nothing Comes for Free, on May 29, 2019. The album has produced two singles: "Choose" and "I Wanna Be It All".

In October 2019, the duo announced on Facebook that they would be parting ways. Their final concert was performed in Calgary, AB on January 24, 2020.

== Discography ==
=== Studio albums ===
Title	Details
Nothing Comes for Free	Release date: May 29, 2019; Label: MDM Recordings; Format: CD, Digital download

=== Extended plays ===
Title	Details
The Ground Floor	Release date: January 2016; Label: Independent
Leaving Thomas	Release date: January 26, 2018; Label: MDM Recordings; Format: Digital download

=== Singles ===
Year	Single	Peak chart positions	Album
Year	Single	CAN Country	Album
2016	"Waiting Kind of Girl"	33	Leaving Thomas
2017	"Best Adventure"	—	Leaving Thomas
2017	"Blame It on the Neon"	19	Leaving Thomas
2018	"Kiss About It"	—	Non-album single
2019	"Choose"	—	Nothing Comes for Free
2019	"I Wanna Be It All"	—	Nothing Comes for Free
"—" denotes releases that did not chart
