= Kiss Me Quiet (song) =

Single by Jess Moskaluke

from the album Kiss Me Quiet
- Released: August 28, 2015
- Genre: Country pop
- Length: 2:53
- Label: MDM Recordings
- Songwriters: Kelly Archer; Corey Crowder; Emily Shackelton
- Producer: Corey Crowder

Jess Moskaluke singles chronology
| "I'm an Open Road" (2015) | "Kiss Me Quiet" (2015) | "Take Me Home" (2016) |

"Kiss Me Quiet" is a song recorded by Canadian country singer Jess Moskaluke for her second extended play of the same name (2015). It was written by Kelly Archer, Corey Crowder, and Emily Shackelton and was produced by Crowder. "Kiss Me Quiet" was released August 28, 2015 as the EP's lead single. The song was Moskaluke's first solo top 10 on the Canada Country chart.

== Promotion ==
"Kiss Me Quiet" was included on the setlist for Moskaluke's opening slot on the Road Trip Tour in 2015.

== Critical reception ==
Kerry Doole of New Canadian Music called the song a "big-production mid-tempo song we predict will be another radio hit."

== Commercial performance ==
"Kiss Me Quiet" entered the Canada Country chart in October 2015. The song reached its peak position of 7 on the chart dated December 7, 2015, earning Moskaluke her first top 10 hit as a lead artist. Her collaboration with Paul Brandt, "I'm an Open Road", also peaked at number 7 three weeks previously, making it her first top 10 overall. "Kiss Me Quiet" was the most-played song on country radio by a Canadian artist for the week of November 30, 2015, according to numbers reported by Nielsen SoundScan. The song was certified Gold by Music Canada in March 2018.

== Music video ==
The official music video for "Kiss Me Quiet" was directed by David Tenniswood and premiered September 16, 2015. It finds Moskaluke teasingly reminding her man that he can kiss her and also includes scenic shots of Canadian wilderness that "show off some beautiful country."

== Charts ==
| Chart (2015) | Peak position |
|---|---|
| Canada Country (Billboard) | 7 |

== Certifications and sales ==
| Region | Certification | Certified units/sales |
|---|---|---|
| Canada (Music Canada) | Gold | 40,000^{‡} |
^{‡} Sales+streaming figures based on certification alone.
