= If I Were You (EP) =

EP by David James
- Released: March 13, 2020
- Genre: Country pop
- Length: 18:36
- Label: MDM Recordings; Universal Music Canada
- Producer: Dan Swinimer

David James chronology
Downtown Kids (2017)	If I Were You (2020)

Singles from If I Were You
- 1. "Cars, Girls, and the Radio" Released: November 9, 2018; 2. "All the Time" Released: August 9, 2019; 3. "If I Were You" Released: March 6, 2020; 4. "Then There's You" Released: September 22, 2020

If I Were You is an extended play by Canadian country pop artist David James. It was released on March 13, 2020, via MDM Recordings and Universal Music Canada. It includes the previously released singles "Cars, Girls, And The Radio", "All The Time", and "If I Were You".

== Track listing ==
No.	Title	Writer(s)	Length
1.	"Then There's You"	Colton Pack; Garrett Nichols; Zachary Beeken	3:10
2.	"If I Were You"	Corey Crowder; Tyler Hubbard; Michael Hardy; Bart Butler	3:00
3.	"Your Man"	Jason Massey; John King; Trannie Anderson	3:07
4.	"Good To Be Alive"	Dan Swinimer; David Seamn; Tavish Crowe; Wesley MacInnes	3:00
5.	"Cars, Girls, And The Radio"	David Thomson; Emily Landis; Jordan Minton	3:14
6.	"All The Time"	Nichols; Beeken; Daniel Ross; Jared Keim; Trannie Stevens	3:05
Total length:			18:36

== Charts ==
Chart performance for singles from If I Were You
Year	Single	Peak chart positions	
Year	Single	AUS Country	CAN Country
2018	"Cars, Girls, And The Radio"	—	37
2019	"All The Time"	—	28
2020	"If I Were You"	39	40
2020	"Then There’s You"	—	35

== Release history ==
Release formats for If I Were You
Country	Date	Format	Label	Ref.
Various	March 13, 2020	Digital download	MDM Recordings	
Various	March 13, 2020	Streaming	MDM Recordings	
