= Take Me Home (Jess Moskaluke song) =

Single by Jess Moskaluke

from the album Kiss Me Quiet
- Released: February 2, 2016
- Genre: Country pop
- Length: 3:11
- Label: MDM Recordings
- Songwriter(s): Kelly Archer; Jess Moskaluke; Emily Shackelton
- Producer(s): Corey Crowder

Jess Moskaluke singles chronology
"Kiss Me Quiet" (2015)	"Take Me Home" (2016)	"Elevator" (2016)

Music video
- "Take Me Home" on YouTube

"Take Me Home" is a song written by Kelly Archer, Jess Moskaluke, and Emily Shackelton and recorded by Moskaluke for her second extended play, Kiss Me Quiet (2015). The record was produced by Corey Crowder. "Take Me Home" was first released to digital retailers through MDM Recordings Inc. on August 28, 2015 alongside previous single, "Kiss Me Quiet", as a promotional single. The song was serviced to Canadian country radio on February 2, 2016 as the EP's second official single.

"Take Me Home" was a success at radio, earning Moskaluke her second consecutive top 10 on the Canada Country chart and also reigning as the most-played song at Canadian country radio in 2016.

== Background and content ==
Moskaluke co-wrote "Take Me Home" with Kelly Archer and Emily Shackelton, two of the writers responsible for her previous single, "Kiss Me Quiet". The song tells the story of a woman who encounters an ex-boyfriend at a bar who tries to pick up where they left off, despite having a new girlfriend at home. Writing the song with other women with similar experiences "made me realize I'm certainly not alone and that other people out there may need to hear this story," Moskaluke told Canadian Beats magazine.

== Commercial performance ==
"Take Me Home" was the most-added song at Canadian country radio for the week of February 8, 2016 and debuted at number 31 on the Canada Country chart dated February 27, 2016. The song peaked at number 7 on the chart dated May 28, 2016, tying with "Kiss Me Quiet" as Moskaluke's highest-charting single to date. "Take Me Home" ranked at number 41 on the year-end country airplay chart, based on spins, but was named the most-played song at Canadian country radio in 2016. The song was certified Gold by Music Canada in September 2019.

== Music video ==
An accompanying music video was released March 9, 2016. Directed by David Hustler, the one take video conceptualizes the song's lyrics as a "tug of war" set before a white sheet backdrop. Critics praised the video's simple but "powerful" treatment and "raw" emotion, noting Moskaluke's tears.

== Charts ==
=== Weekly charts ===
Chart (2016)	Peak position
Canada Country (Billboard)	7

=== Year end charts ===
Chart (2016)	Position
Canada Country (Billboard)	41

== Certifications and sales ==
Region	Certification	Certified units/sales
Canada (Music Canada)	Gold	40,000^{‡}
^{‡} Sales+streaming figures based on certification alone.

== Release history ==
Country	Date	Format	Label	Ref.
Canada	August 28, 2015	Digital download (promotional)	MDM Recordings	
Canada	February 2, 2016	Country radio	MDM Recordings	
