= The Demos (Jess Moskaluke album) =

Studio album by Jess Moskaluke
- Released: February 19, 2021
- Genre: Country
- Length: 33:16
- Label: MDM Recordings; Universal Music Canada; ABC
- Producer: Corey Crowder; Zach Abend; Mark Holman

Jess Moskaluke chronology
Past the Past (2017)	The Demos (2021)	Heartbreaker (2023)

Singles from The Demos
- 1. "Country Girls" Released: October 18, 2019; 2. "Halfway Home" Released: April 10, 2020; 3. "Mapdot" Released: October 16, 2020; 4. "Leave Each Other Alone" Released: May 7, 2021; 5. "Nothin' I Don't Love About You" Released: July 25, 2021

The Demos is the second studio album by Canadian country artist Jess Moskaluke. It was released on February 19, 2021, through MDM Recordings. It includes the number-one Canada Country hit "Country Girls", as well as "Halfway Home", "Mapdot", "Leave Each Other Alone", and "Nothin' I Don't Love About You".

== Background ==
Before the onset of the COVID-19 pandemic, Moskaluke had not intended to release an album for some time, intending to work on singles instead. After the institution of travel restrictions, she could not travel from her home in Saskatchewan to Nashville, Tennessee to record new music with producer Corey Crowder. Rather than writing new songs, Moskaluke decided to delve into her back catalogue of songs she had never recorded on past albums. She worked with Crowder to virtually turn the demos of these songs into a fully-produced record.

== Critical reception ==
The Demos received generally positive reviews. Joshua Murray of The Reviews Are In called the album a "good listen" that "[doesn't] seem to go by too quickly or too slowly". Kim Hughes of Parton and Pearl noted Moskaluke's "mighty, indefatigable" voice. Hannah Rastrick of Complete Country said that the "songs cover every stage of love that we can all relate to" and referred to Moskaluke's vocals as "spot on".

== Track listing ==
The Demos
No.	Title	Writer(s)	Length
1.	"Country Girls"	Jess Moskaluke; Corey Crowder; Emily Shackleton	2:58
2.	"Nothin' I Don't Love About You"	Moskaluke; Crowder; Mark Holman	2:46
3.	"Mapdot"	Moskaluke; Zach Abend; Liz Rose	3:24
4.	"Too Much Too Soon"	Moskaluke; Crowder; Livy Jeanne	2:42
5.	"Leave Each Other Alone" (featuring Travis Collins)	Moskaluke; Abend; Trannie Anderson	3:44
6.	"Halfway Home"	Moskaluke; Joseph Fox; Olivia Richardson; Michael Whitworth	2:31
7.	"Drive His Truck"	Moskaluke; Crowder; Sarah Buxton; Racheal Woodward	2:59
8.	"No Place Like You"	Moskaluke; Crowder; Cary Barlowe; Dave Barnes	2:36
9.	"Mapdot" (demo)	Moskaluke; Abend; Rose	3:14
10.	"Leave Each Other Alone" (demo)	Moskaluke; Abend; Anderson	3:49
11.	"Halfway Home" (demo)	Moskaluke; Fox; Richardson; Whitworth	2:29
Total length:			33:16

== Charts ==
=== Singles ===
Year	Single	Peak chart positions			Certifications
Year	Single	CAN Country	CAN Digital	AUS Country	Certifications
2019	"Country Girls"	1	31	13	MC: Gold
2020	"Halfway Home"	11	—	4	
2020	"Mapdot"	15	—	44	
2021	"Leave Each Other Alone"	35	—	29	
2021	"Nothin' I Don't Love About You"	13	—	—	
"—" denotes releases that did not chart or were not released to that territory

== Release history ==
Release formats for The Demos
Country	Date	Format	Label	Ref.
Australia	February 19, 2021	Digital download; Streaming	MDM Recordings; ABC Music	
Various	February 19, 2021	Digital download; Streaming	MDM Recordings	
Canada	February 19, 2021	Digital download; Streaming	MDM Recordings; Universal Music Canada	
Canada	May 2021	Compact disc	MDM Recordings; Universal Music Canada	
