= Country Girls (Jess Moskaluke song) =

2019 single by Jess Moskaluke

Single by Jess Moskaluke

from the album The Demos
- Released: October 18, 2019
- Genre: Country
- Length: 2:59
- Label: MDM Recordings
- Songwriters: Jess Moskaluke; Corey Crowder; Emily Shackelton
- Producer: Corey Crowder

Jess Moskaluke singles chronology
| "Save Some of That Whiskey" (2018) | "Country Girls" (2019) | "Halfway Home" (2020) |

Music video
- "Country Girls" on YouTube

"Country Girls" is a song recorded by Canadian country music artist Jess Moskaluke. The track was co-written by Moskaluke and producer Corey Crowder, along with Emily Shackelton. It became Moskaluke's first Number One hit, and was included on her second studio album The Demos.

== Critical reception ==
"Country Girls" was named Top Country "Pick of the Week" for the week of October 25, 2019. They called the track a "rhythmic dazzler" that "features Moskaluke’s signature soaring vocals layered with delicate harmonies, twangy banjo and an impossibly hooky chorus, resulting in a track dripping in modernity while honouring traditional country roots".

== Commercial performance ==
"Country Girls" reached a peak of number 1 on the Billboard Canada Country chart dated March 14, 2020, her first chart-topper. It also peaked at number 31 on Billboard Hot Canadian Digital Songs, and reached number 13 on the Australian Country Hot 50. As of December 2020, "Country Girls" had received over 2.6 million streams through Spotify. In October 2021, the song was certified Gold by Music Canada.

== Music video ==
The official music video for "Country Girls" was directed by Stephano Barberis and premiered February 13, 2020.

== Charts ==
| Chart (2019–20) | Peak position |
|---|---|
| Australia Country Hot 50 (TMN) | 13 |
| Canada Country (Billboard) | 1 |
| Canada Digital Songs (Billboard) | 31 |

== Certifications and sales ==
| Region | Certification | Certified units/sales |
|---|---|---|
| Canada (Music Canada) | Gold | 40,000^{‡} |
^{‡} Sales+streaming figures based on certification alone.
