= Pillow Talkin' =

2019 song by Tyler Joe Miller

Single by Tyler Joe Miller

from the EP Sometimes I Don't, But Sometimes I Do
- Released: December 25, 2019
- Genre: Country
- Length: 3:20
- Label: MDM
- Songwriter(s): Kelly Archer; Blake Chaffin; Brett Tyler
- Producer(s): Danick Dupelle

Tyler Joe Miller singles chronology
"Pillow Talkin'" (2019)	"I Would Be Over Me Too" (2020)

Music video
- "Pillow Talkin'" (Loft Session) on YouTube

"Pillow Talkin'" is the debut single recorded by Canadian country music artist Tyler Joe Miller. The track was co-written by Kelly Archer, Blake Chaffin, and Brett Tyler. The song was the lead single off Miller's debut extended play Sometimes I Don't, But Sometimes I Do. It was the first ever debut single from an independent artist to hit #1 on the Billboard Canada Country chart.

== Background ==
Miller told the Surrey Now-Leader how he came to record the song:

"Kelly [Archer] and I were writing another song ("I Would Be Over Me Too") in Nashville, and after we finished writing that one, she said 'Hey, I like your voice and your style, what you're doing, and I think I have another one for you.' So they pitched me 'Pillow Talkin' and it went from there."

The song was sent to radio on Christmas Day in 2019.

== Commercial performance ==
"Pillow Talkin'" reached a peak of #1 on the Billboard Canada Country chart dated May 16, 2020, making Miller the first independently signed artist to land a #1 hit with their debut single in the history of the chart. The song also reached a peak of #70 on the Canadian Hot 100, and was certified Gold by Music Canada. In Australia, it reached a peak of #28 on the TMN Country Hot 50.

== Track listings ==
Digital download – single

1. "Pillow Talkin'" – 3:20

Digital download – single

1. "Pillow Talkin'" (Acoustic) – 3:13

== Charts ==
Chart (2020)	Peak position
Australia Country Hot 50 (TMN)	28
Canadian Hot 100 (Billboard)	70
Canada Country (Billboard)	1

== Certifications ==
Region	Certification	Certified units/sales
Canada (Music Canada)	Gold	40,000^{‡}
^{‡} Sales+streaming figures based on certification alone.
