= Catch Me If You Can (EP) =

EP by Jess Moskaluke
- Released: September 4, 2012
- Recorded: 2011–12
- Genre: Country; pop rock
- Length: 26:06
- Label: MDM Recordings
- Producer: Mitch Merrett; Ilya Toshinskiy

Jess Moskaluke chronology
Catch Me If You Can (2012)	Light Up the Night (2014)

Singles from Catch Me If You Can
- 1. "Catch Me If You Can" Released: June 5, 2012; 2. "Hit N' Run" Released: January 28, 2013

Catch Me If You Can is the debut extended play by Canadian country music artist Jess Moskaluke. It was released on September 4, 2012 via MDM Recordings and marks her first studio effort. It include the singles "Catch Me If You Can" and "Hit N' Run". Four of the songs, including the title track, were previously included on her Tyler Ward-distributed 2011 collection, Amen Hallelujah.

== Critical reception ==
Jeff DeDekker of the Leader-Post gave the EP four stars out of five, writing that "by using the full extent of her voice and also incorporating tenderness and fragility, Moskaluke is able to cover the complete spectrum of material." Casadie Pederson of Top Country also gave the EP four stars out of five, calling Moskaluke "one of the best young talents we've seen in a long time."

== Track listing ==
No.	Title	Writer(s)	Length
1.	"Famous"		3:07
2.	"Catch Me If You Can"	Tiffany Vartanyan; Rachel Flanigan; Jess Moskaluke	3:36
3.	"Flawed"	Jason Collum; Deanna Harper; Moskaluke	3:00
4.	"Amen Hallelujah"		3:06
5.	"Hardest Day"	Rick Beresford; Deanna Walker; Vartanyan; Moskaluke	3:32
6.	"Derailed"	Vartanyan; Beresford; Walker; Moskaluke	3:38
7.	"Go Big or Go Home"	Vartanyan; Owen Kortz; Moskaluke	2:59
8.	"Hit N' Run"	Moskaluke; Alex Kline; Kirk Sauers	3:08
Total length:			26:06

== Chart performance ==
=== Singles ===
Year	Single	Peak positions
Year	Single	CAN Country
2012	"Catch Me If You Can"	49
2013	"Hit N' Run"	37
