= Shae Dupuy =

Canadian singer and songwriter

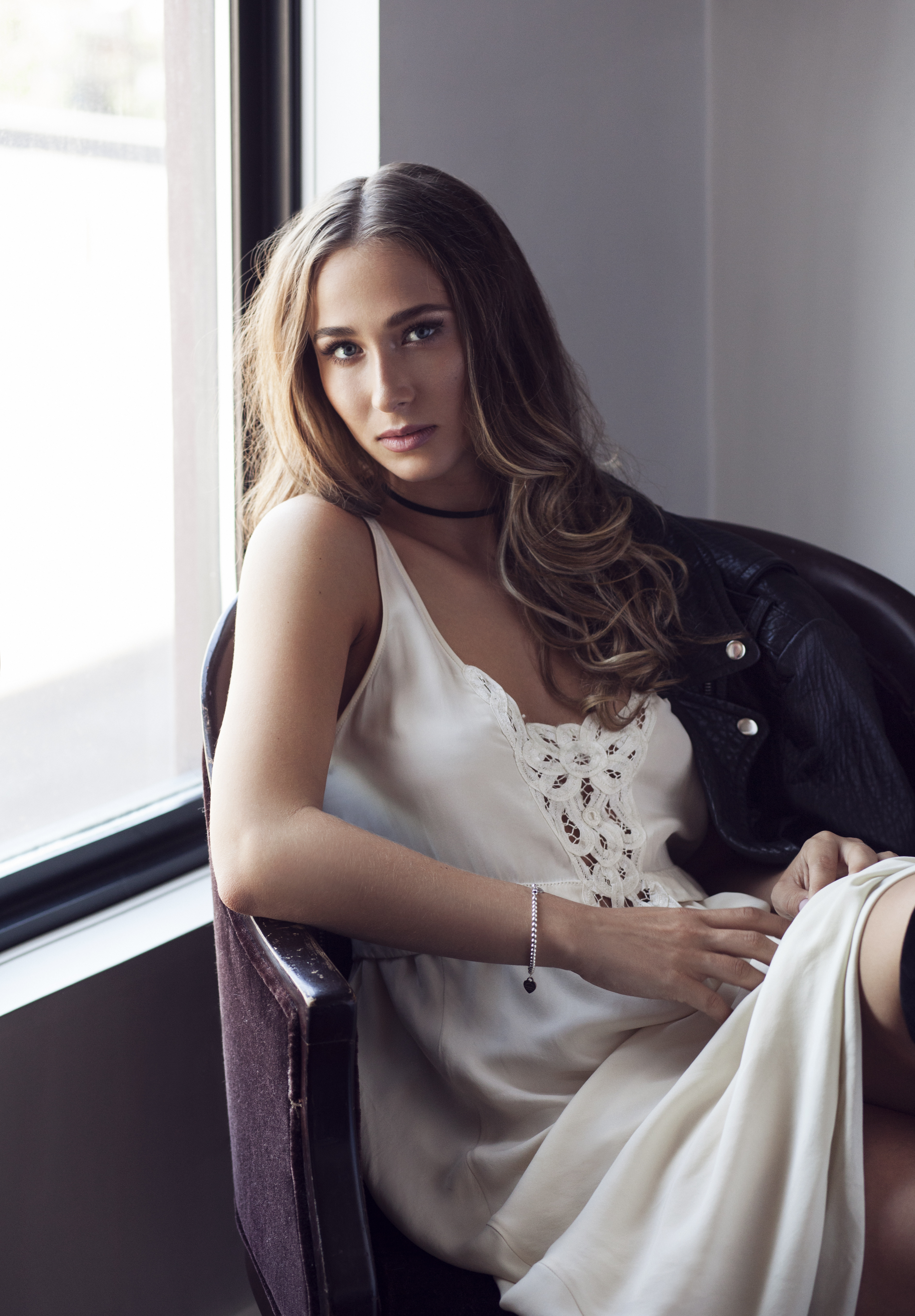

Background information
- Born: December 26, 1995 (age 30); Kamloops, British Columbia, Canada
- Genres: Country
- Occupation: Singer-songwriter
- Years active: 2014–present
- Labels: Independent
- Website: shaedupuy.com

Shae Dupuy is a Canadian country singer and songwriter. She has released two EPs: Breakdown in 2014 and Brave in 2016. Her third studio EP is expected to release in Fall 2022.

Dupuy was nominated for the "Rising Star" award at the 2022 Country Music Association of Ontario (CMAO) Awards. Additionally, she was nominated for the "Creative Director(s) of the Year" category at the 2021 Canadian Country Music Association (CCMA) Awards. Her song Tin Man hit No. 2 in Italy and No. 10 in Russia on the iTunes Country Music Chart.

== Career ==
=== Breakdown EP (2014 to 2015) ===
Dupuy began her career as a recording artist in 2014, releasing her debut single, Grandpa's Truck, and her debut EP, Breakdown, in June of that year. Both the single and EP attracted the attention of Country Music Television Canada (CMT), which named her its "Fresh Face Artist" for October 2014. In 2015, Dupuy opened for Dallas Smith and Jess Moskaluke at the Music in the Fields festival.

=== Brave EP (2016 to 2019) ===
Brave, Dupuy's second EP, was released in October 2016. Jeff Johnson and Jason Barry produced the EP.

In 2018, Dupuy performed across Canada as part of her "Let The Good Times Roll" tour to promote Brave. She made stops in Ontario, Quebec, British Columbia, Alberta, Nova Scotia, New Brunswick, and Prince Edward Island, including a performance at the Cavendish Beach Music Festival. Supporting acts included Kris Barclay, Nicole Sumerlyn, and Aaron Pollock. Dupuy was also a featured opener for Cold Creek County during their 2018 tour.

=== Upcoming Third EP (2020 to Present) ===
By 2019, Dupuy relocated to Nashville to collaborate with some of the top songwriters in country music on a full-time basis. In 2020, the singles Hesitate, Black and White, and Selfish were released ahead of Dupuy's third EP, which is expected to release in Fall 2022.

=== Award Nominations ===
Dupuy was nominated for the "Rising Star" category at the 2016, 2018, and 2022 Country Music Association of Ontario (CMAO) Awards. Dupuy's music video for Drink About It was nominated for the "Music Video of the Year" category at the 2016 CMAO Awards as well. Additionally, following the success of her #strongisbeautiful campaign on Instagram, Dupuy was nominated for the "Interactive Artist of Group of the Year" category at the 2017 Canadian Country Music Association (CCMA) Awards. In 2021, Dupuy, along with Ceci Mula, received a CCMA nomination in the "Creative Director(s) of the Year" category for her single, music video, and promotional material for her song Selfish.

== Discography ==
=== EPs ===
Title	Details
Breakdown	Released June 27, 2014; Independent; No longer available for digital download or streaming
Brave	Released October 28, 2016; Independent

=== Singles ===
Year	Title	Release
2014	Grandpa's Truck	Grandpa's Truck Single
2014	Breakdown	Breakdown Single
2016	In My Father's Eyes	In My Father's Eyes Single
2017	Liar	Liar Single
2020	Hesitate	Hesitate Single
2020	Black and White	Black and White Single
2020	Selfish	Selfish Single

=== Music Videos ===
Year	Title
2014	Grandpa's Truck
2014	Breakdown
2015	Drink About It
2016	Tin Man
2016	In My Father's Eyes
2016	Good For Me
2016	Wishing On You
2016	Liar (Acoustic)
2020	Selfish

=== Lyric Videos ===
Year	Title
2017	Liar
2020	Hesitate

== Awards and nominations ==
Year	Association	Category	Result
2015	Unsigned Only Music Competition	Best Original Country Song for Breakdown	Semi-finalist
2016	Unsigned Only Music Competition	Best Original Country Song for Drink About It	Finalist
2016	Country Music Association of Ontario	Rising Star	Nominated
2016	Country Music Association of Ontario	Music Video of the Year for Drink About It	Nominated
2017	Canadian Country Music Association	Interactive Artist or Group of the Year	Nominated
2018	Country Music Association of Ontario	Rising Star	Nominated
2020	American Songwriter Song Contest	Top 35 Songs of 2020 for Black and White	Finalist
2021	Canadian Country Music Association	Creative Director(s) of the Year for Selfish	Nominated
2022	Country Music Association of Ontario	Rising Star	Nominated
