= Restless Road =

American country music band

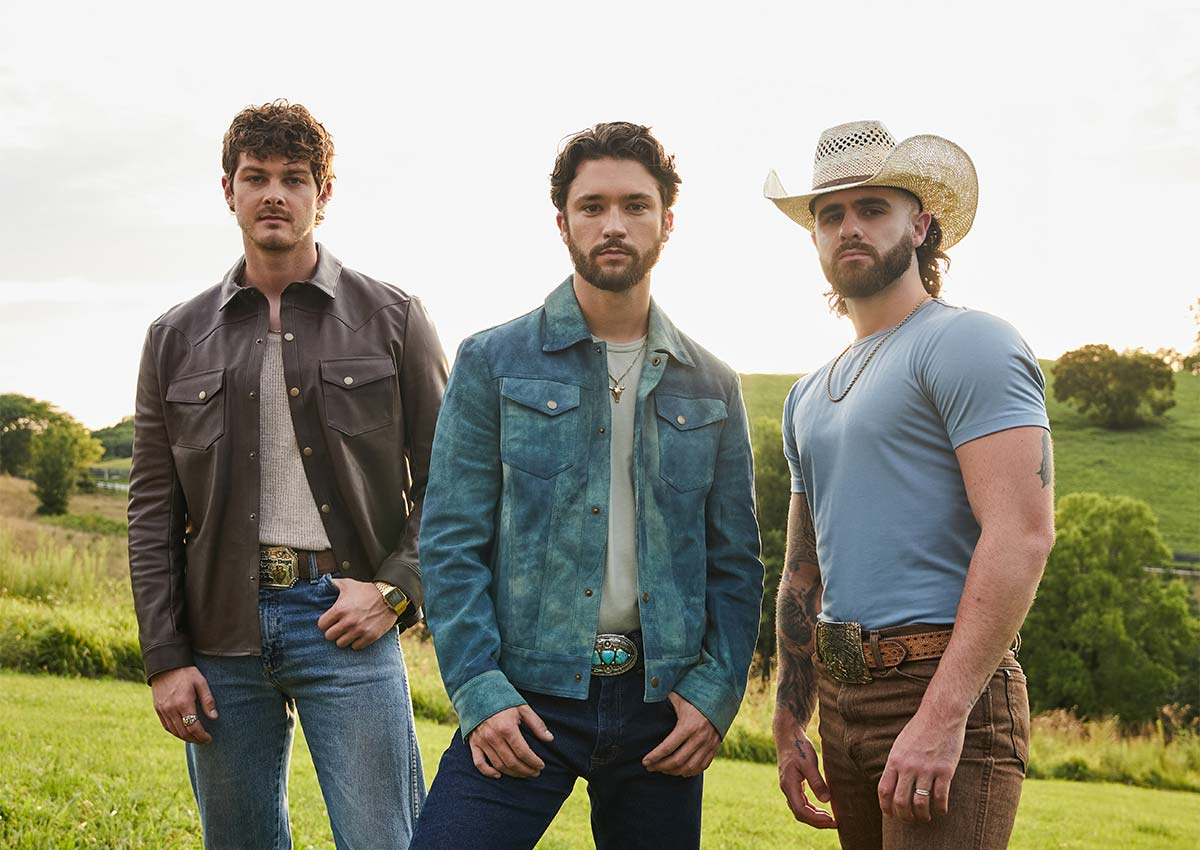

Background information
- Origin: Nashville, Tennessee, U.S
- Genres: Country; country pop
- Years active: 2013–present
- Label: RCA Nashville
- Members: Zach Beeken; Colton Pack; Garrett Nichols
- Past members: Andrew Scholz; Jared Keim
- Website: www.restlessroad.com

Restless Road is an American country music band based in Nashville, Tennessee. The band is made up of Zach Beeken, Garrett Nichols, and Colton Pack who originally auditioned solo for the third season of the American singing competition series The X Factor before performing as a group on the show. The band signed a record deal with Sony Music Nashville and released their debut, self-titled EP in 2020. Their debut album was released in 2023. They have also written songs for Rascal Flatts, Granger Smith, David James, and Kane Brown.

== History ==
=== 2013–2018: Formation and The X Factor ===
Beeken, a Pennsylvania native, and Pack, a West Virginia native, met in 2013 while auditioning as solo contestants on season 3 of The X Factor. It was there that they met future collaborator Kane Brown, who was also auditioning for the show.

Beeken and Pack were eliminated before making it to the Top 40, but producer Simon Cowell invited them back to audition as a group with singer Andrew Scholz. The new trio, called Restless Road, ultimately finished fourth on the season semi-final, which aired on December 12, 2013. Subsequently, the band moved to Nashville, Tennessee, to pursue success as a country trio.

In February 2014, Pack announced his decision to amicably depart from the band and was replaced by Jared Keim, whom the other members discovered through a Dan + Shay cover he had posted to Facebook. In May 2015, Scholz left the band to pursue a career as a solo artist and was replaced by Garrett Nichols, a former contestant on season 13 of American Idol. In 2018, Keim left the group and was replaced by a returning Pack.

=== 2019–present: Last Rodeo ===
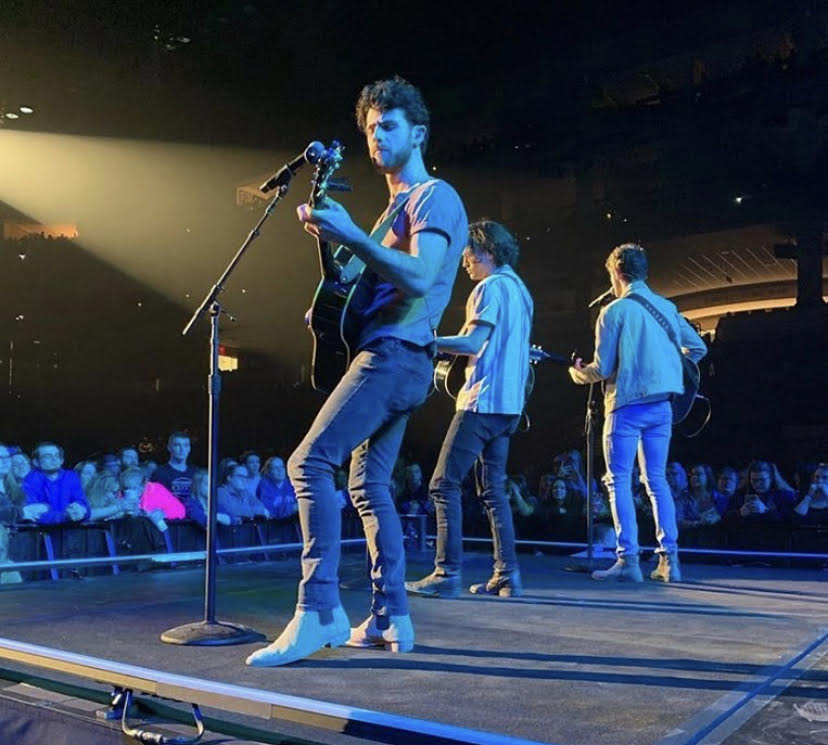
Restless Road performing in 2020

After the dissolution of a record deal, Beeken and Nichols began working as bartenders in Nashville. While Pack was working construction and releasing music in West Virginia, Kane Brown contacted him after seeing his cover of "Good as You", a song by Brown. Brown, an RCA Nashville/Zone 4 artist, was beginning to develop new acts under his own label imprint, and he offered Restless Road a record deal. This led to Pack rejoining the band, and in November 2019, they went into the studio with Dann Huff to begin recording a debut project.

On January 6, 2020, Brown invited Restless Road onstage during his sold-out Staples Center concert to premiere their collaboration, "Take Me Home" a track inspired by John Denver's "Take Me Home, Country Roads". Brown and Restless Road released the song and its music video in February 2020. It later peaked at No. 7 on Billboard's Digital Song Sales chart. Later that month, the band released Restless Road, a four-song EP including "Take Me Home". That same day, they performed "Take Me Home" together with Brown on the Today show. The same year, Restless Road signed a worldwide publishing deal with Sony/ATV. In CMT's program Off The Road With Restless Road, which aired October 16, the band revealed they were working with Huff on their debut album.

In 2022, Restless Road performed on The Bachelor. In 2023, they released their debut studio album Last Rodeo, which included new songs as well as already released tracks such as "Growing Old with You". The group was also recognized by Spotify as Hot Country Artists to Watch, as well as an Opry Artist to Watch in 2022. They also released the singles "On My Way", "I Don't Wanna Be That Guy", and "Last Rodeo". They began the year on tour in Europe and the UK as well as playing Stagecoach and CMA Music Festival.

== Discography ==
=== Studio albums ===
List of studio albums, with selected details and peak chart positions
Title	Album details	Peak chart positions
Title	Album details	US Country
Last Rodeo	Release date: October 20, 2023; Label: RCA Nashville; Format: CD, digital download	42

=== Extended plays ===
- Restless Road (Sony Music Nashville, 2020)

=== Singles ===
List of singles, with selected peak chart positions
Title	Year	Peak chart positions		Album
Title	Year	US Country	US Country Airplay	Album
"Growing Old with You"	2022	43	40	Last Rodeo
"Last Rodeo"	2024	—	53	Last Rodeo
