= If It Was That Easy =

Studio album by Bobby Wills
- Released: November 6, 2012
- Genre: Country
- Length: 34:07
- Label: On Ramp
- Producer: Michael Pyle

Bobby Wills chronology
Man with No Past (2010)	If It Was That Easy (2012)	Crazy Enough (2014)

Singles from If It Was That Easy
- 1. "Show Some Respect" Released: June 4, 2012; 2. "Somebody Will" Released: November 5, 2012; 3. "If It Was That Easy" Released: April 2013; 4. "When It Comes to You" Released: October 8, 2013

If It Was That Easy is the second studio album by Canadian country music artist Bobby Wills. It was released on November 6, 2012, via On Ramp Records and distributed by EMI. The single "Somebody Will" peaked at number 91 on the Billboard Canadian Hot 100.

== Critical reception ==
Richard Amery of L.A. Beat wrote that "Wills combines elements of Clint Black, Alan Jackson and Gord Bamford on a variety of upbeat, catchy country rockers which are definitely Top 40 country radio friendly."

== Track listing ==
No.	Title	Writer(s)	Length
1.	"Show Some Respect"	Walt Aldridge, Michael Pyle, Bobby Wills	4:00
2.	"Somebody Will"	Aldridge, Pyle, Wills	3:11
3.	"When It Comes to You"	Aldridge, Pyle, Wills	3:42
4.	"Life in a Small Town"	Aldridge, Pyle	2:56
5.	"Done Quittin"	Wade Kirby, Pyle, Wills	3:35
6.	"The Far Side of Gone"	Pyle, Wills	3:27
7.	"Did My Back Hurt Your Knife"	Thomas Wade, Wills	3:15
8.	"Ceilings & Floors"	Pyle, Aldridge	3:46
9.	"Highway and a Song"	Pyle, Wills	3:07
10.	"If It Was That Easy"	Pyle, Alridge,	3:08
Total length:			34:07

== Chart performance ==
=== Singles ===
Year	Single	Peak chart positions	
Year	Single	CAN Country	CAN
2012	"Show Some Respect"	—	—
2012	"Somebody Will"	9	91
2013	"If It Was That Easy"	24	—
2013	"When It Comes to You"	22	—
"—" denotes releases that did not chart
