= Josh Stumpf =

Canadian country music singer and songwriter

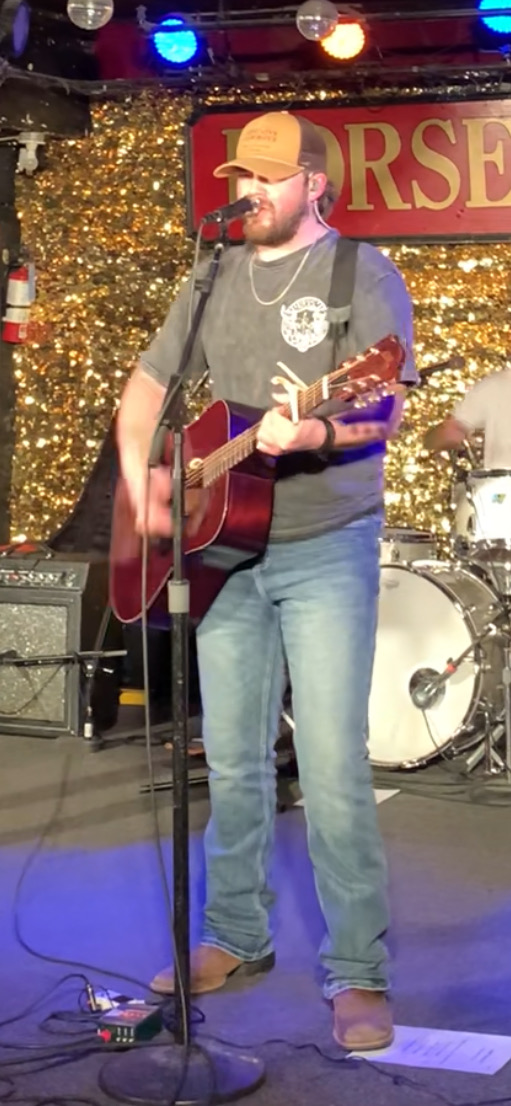
- Stumpf performing in Toronto, Ontario, at the Horseshoe Tavern in May 2025

Background information
- Born: September 27, 2002 (age 24); Prince Albert, Saskatchewan, Canada
- Genre: Country
- Occupations: Singer, songwriter
- Instruments: Guitar, vocals
- Years active: 2022-present
- Labels: MDM; Funky Moose
- Website: Official website

Joshua Stumpf is a Canadian country music singer and songwriter from Prince Albert, Saskatchewan. He is currently signed to MDM Recordings. Stump has charted two singles, "Highway Money" and "Nobody Roads" in the top ten of the Billboard Canada Country chart.

== Biography ==
Stumpf was born and raised in Prince Albert, Saskatchewan. He listened to country music in his dad's garage as a kid, and taught himself to play the guitar when he was in middle school. While in high school, Stumpf took vocal and singing lessons, performed at high school assemblies and events, and led his church's worship team. Stumpf considered Morgan Wallen and Luke Combs to be vocal inspirations to him while learning how to sing. He worked as a farmer for a year in Smeaton, Saskatchewan, and then lived two years in Saskatoon while attempting to kickstart his music career, before moving back to Prince Albert. In 2022, Stumpf co-founded the annual Sunset Country Music Festival in MacDowall, Saskatchewan to raise funds for charity.

In 2023, Stumpf released his first single "Drink Me a Lullaby". In 2024, he released the song "That Song in This Truck" and won the "Emerging Artist Award" at the 2024 Saskatchewan Country Music Awards. That same year, Stumpf signed a record deal with MDM Recordings. In April 2025, Stumpf released "Highway Money", his debut single release with MDM. He followed up with the single "Nobody Roads" in September 2025. Stumpf was a semi-finalist in the 2026 SiriusXM Top of the Country contest.

== Discography ==
=== Extended plays ===
List of EPs, with selected details
Title	Details
Josh Stumpf	Release date: June 7, 2024; Label: Funky Moose Records; Format: Digital download, streaming
Two-Lane Testimony	Release date: April 24, 2026; Label: MDM Recordings; Format: Digital download, streaming

=== Singles ===
Year	Title	Peak chart positions			Album
Year	Title	CAN	CAN Country	AUS Country	Album
2023	"Drink Me a Lullaby"	—	—	—	Non-album single
2025	"Highway Money"	—	6	31	Two-Lane Testimony
2025	"Nobody Roads"	81	7	—	Two-Lane Testimony
2026	"Johnnie Walker (Back to Me)"	95	17	21	Two-Lane Testimony

=== Music videos ===
Year	Title	Director
2024	"That Song in This Truck"	Jabez Santiago
2025	"Highway Money"	Ryan Nolan
