= Fighting (Tyler Joe Miller song) =

2020 song by Tyler Joe Miller

Single by Tyler Joe Miller

from the EP Sometimes I Don't, But Sometimes I Do
- Released: December 25, 2020
- Genre: Country
- Length: 3:49
- Label: MDM
- Songwriter(s): Tyler Joe Miller; Dan Swinimer; Dave Faber; Wes Mack
- Producer(s): Danick Dupelle

Tyler Joe Miller singles chronology
"I Would Be Over Me Too" (2020)	"Fighting" (2020)	"Sometimes I Do" (2021)

Music video
- "Fighting" on YouTube

"Fighting" is a song co-written and recorded by Canadian country artist Tyler Joe Miller. The song was co-written with Dan Swinimer, Dave Faber, and Wes Mack. It was the third single off his extended play Sometimes I Don't, But Sometimes I Do.

== Background ==
Miller stated that the song is about "fighting with yourself and your insecurities to overcome them and try to become a better person".

== Critical reception ==
Country Town named the song "Song of the Day", noting how it takes on mental illness and "emphasises the message of ‘one day at a time’".

== Music video ==
The official music video for "Fighting" premiered on February 4, 2021. The video included a message about suicide prevention and seeking help for mental health.

== Charts ==
"Fighting" reached a peak of number eight on the Billboard Canada Country chart, and #85 on the Canadian Hot 100.

Chart performance for "Fighting"
Chart (2021)	Peak position
Canada (Canadian Hot 100)	85
Canada Country (Billboard)	8
