= Mapdot =

2020 single by Jess Moskaluke

Single by Jess Moskaluke

from the album The Demos
- Released: October 16, 2020
- Genre: Country pop
- Length: 3:24
- Label: MDM; Universal Australia
- Songwriters: Jess Moskaluke; Zach Abend; Liz Rose
- Producer: Corey Crowder

Jess Moskaluke singles chronology
"Halfway Home" (2020)	"Mapdot" (2020)	"Leave Each Other Alone" (2021)

Music video
- "Mapdot" on YouTube

"Mapdot" is a song co-written and recorded by Canadian country artist Jess Moskaluke. The song was co-written with Zach Abend and Liz Rose, and produced by Corey Crowder. It was the third single from Moskaluke's 2021 studio album The Demos.

== Background ==
Moskaluke was born and raised in Langenburg, Saskatchewan and continues to live there today. She stated that "I've always wanted to write a tribute to my hometown, but I wanted to get it right", adding it took years to before she wrote the song. She said she waited until she had the "right idea, the platform, and the songwriting ability to give this song, and this town, the credit it deserves".

== Critical reception ==
John R. Kennedy of iHeartRadio Canada said the song "[sings] the praises of small towns all across Canada". The Music Express referred to "Mapdot" as an "ode to smalltown pride".

== Accolades ==
Year	Association	Category	Result	Ref
2021	CCMA	Songwriter(s) of the Year	Nominated	

== Music video ==
The official music video was for "Mapdot" was filmed in Rocanville, Saskatchewan and directed by Tanner Goetz. It premiered on November 12, 2020.

== Charts ==
"Mapdot" reached a peak of #15 on the Billboard Canada Country chart, marking her fourteenth Top 20 hit. It also reached a peak of #44 on the TMN Australian Country Hot 50.

Chart (2020–21)	Peak position
Australia Country Hot 50 (TMN)	44
Canada Country (Billboard)	15
