= Catch Us If You Can (disambiguation) =

"Catch Us If You Can" is a 1965 song by The Dave Clark Five.

Catch Us If You Can may also refer to:

- Catch Us If You Can (film), a 1965 film by John Boorman
- Catch Us If You Can (album), the 1965 soundtrack album to the film by The Dave Clark Five
- "Catch Us If You Can" (Grounded for Life episode), a 2001 episode of the sitcom Grounded for Life
- Catch Us If You Can (game show), an Australian television series

== See also ==
- Catch Me If You Can (disambiguation)
