= Travis Collins =

Australian country music artist (born 1985)

- Born: Travis William Collins; 4 May 1985 (age 41); Cessnock, New South Wales, Australia
- Origin: Tamworth, New South Wales, Australia
- Genre: Country
- Occupation: Musician
- Instruments: Vocals; electric guitar; acoustic guitar
- Years active: 2004–present
- Labels: ABC; Warner; Universal
- Formerly of: Adam Brand and the Outlaws
- Website: traviscollins.com.au

Travis William Collins (born 4 May 1985 in Cessnock, New South Wales) is an Australian country music singer-songwriter and guitarist. Three of his albums have reached the ARIA Albums Chart top 20, Hard Light (2016), Brave & the Broken (2018) and Wreck Me (2020). He has won eight Golden Guitar trophies at the annual Country Music Awards of Australia and four CMC Australian awards. Collins is an ambassador for RUOK? Day.

== Early life ==
Travis William Collins was born on 4 May 1985 in Cessnock, New South Wales, Australia. He is the second youngest son of six children, their parents are Terry Collins, also a musician, and Debbie (née Conroy). Collins busked on Peel Street, Tamworth at age 11. He was a graduate of the NSW Public Schools Talent Development Program.

== Career ==
In January 2004 Travis Collins competed at the Star Maker Quest at the Tamworth Country Music Festival. He won for his performance of "Bridge That You Won't Burn", which was co-written by Collins with his father Terry. "Bridge That You Won't Burn" was released as his debut single in May 2004. He issued his debut studio album, Start the Car, in 2005 via ABC Music. It peaked at No. 15 on the ARIA Hitseekers Albums chart.

His second album, No Boundaries (18 August 2007), reached No. 18 on the ARIA Hitseekers Albums chart. It was co-produced by Collins and Herm Kovac. Dave Dawson of Nu Country observed, "the peaks are the album's finale – anthemic agoraphobia escape tune 'Walls Come Down' and summary justice narrative 'What Comes Around'." Capital News' Susan Jarvis felt, "[it's a] collection of great tracks points to a stellar international career... [and] is sheer class, featuring several [Collins] originals and some well-chosen tracks from leading writers."

His third album is self-titled and appeared on 7 November 2011 but it did not chart. On 13 February 2015 Collins released his fourth studio album, Wired, via Universal Music Australia, which peaked at No. 26 on the ARIA Albums Chart; it also debuted at No. 1 on the associated ARIA Country Albums Chart. Kevin Walsh of Good Morning Country proclaimed it Album of the Week, and explained, "[it] couples classic country sounds with the artist’s unique ear for a captivating rock tune."

Collins joined fellow country artist Adam Brand, together with Drew McAlister (ex-McAlister Kemp), Matt Cornell (ex-Baby Animals) and Mike Carr (p.k.a. Buddy Goode) to perform as Adam Brand and the Outlaws at the Gympie Muster in August 2015. They issued an album, Adam Brand and the Outlaws, in January 2016.

Hard Light, the artist's fifth album, appeared on 6 May 2016, which peaked at No. 20 on the ARIA Albums Chart and No. 2 on the related Country Albums Chart. Sunburnt Country Music″s Sophie Hamley felt, "[it provides] solid country rock performed with an ability to sing a sweet note and make it sound authentic." Staff writer for Yarrawonga Chronicle described how, "[it] moves everything up a gear, with Collins digging deeper than ever before, not only with his vocals but also as a musician and a songwriter." At 2017 Country Music Awards of Australia (CMAA) Collins won three Golden Guitar trophies: Male Artist of the Year for Hard Light, Song of the Year for "Call Me Crazy" (shared with co-writer, Damien Leith), and Single of the Year for "Just Another Girl".

Collins collaborated with label mate, Amber Lawrence, on the seven-track extended play, Our Backyard (31 July 2017), which peaked at No. 40 on the ARIA Albums Chart and No. 2 on the Country Albums Chart. It details Australian stories about life, love and friendship. At the 2018 Country Music Awards of Australia he won three more Golden Guitar trophies: Vocal Collaboration of the Year (with Lawrence) for "Our Backyard", Song of the Year for "Our Backyard" (shared with Lawrence and Matt Scullion) and Single of the Year for "Our Backyard" (shared with Lawrence).

On 17 August 2018 Collins released his sixth solo album, Brave and the Broken, recorded in Nashville with all tracks written or co-written by Collins. He was joined in the studio by session musicians, Carl Miner on acoustic guitar (Taylor Swift), Mike Rojas on keyboards (Luke Bryan), and Jimmy Carter on bass guitar (Alan Jackson); it was produced by Luke Wooten (Brad Paisley, Dierks Bentley). Brave and the Broken peaked at No. 15 on ARIA Albums Chart, No. 1 on its Country Albums Chart, No. 4 on ARIA Australian Artists Albums, No. 5 on Top 100 Physical Albums and No. 10 on Digital Albums charts. Rebecca Belt of The Country Journo observed, "[it] came from a place of healing... [and] about people who make small anonymous efforts everyday."

The artist's seventh studio album. Wreck Me, appeared 31 July 2020, which peaked at No. 8 on ARIA Albums Chart and No. 1 on their Country Albums Chart. It was produced by Wooten, again. Hamley determined, "you're always going to be listening to an album that is produced to high standards, that has tight songs, in which Collins will use his fantastic voice – so well suited to country music – to make sure those songs find their best expression." The album provided three singles, "Make Up", "Weekend" and "Rainy Day". Later that year he issued an acoustic version of Wreck Me.

In May 2021 Collins was featured vocalist on Canadian country artist Jess Moskaluke's single "Leave Each Other Alone" from her second album, The Demos (February 2021).

Collins was nominated for six awards at the 2024 Country Music Awards of Australia.

== Discography ==
=== Studio albums ===
List of studio albums, with release date and label shown
Title	Album details	Peak chart positions	
Title	Album details	AUS	AUS Country
Start the Car	Released: 2005; Label: ABC Music, Warner Music Australia (5046798672); Format: CD	—	—
No Boundaries	Released: 18 August 2007; Label: Travis Collins, ABC Music, Warner (5144225802); Format: CD	—	—
Travis Collins	Released: 7 November 2011; Label: ABC Music (736211567086); Format: CD	—	—
Wired	Released: 13 February 2015; Label: ABC Music, Universal Music Australia (UMA) (4711624); Format: CD	26	1
Hard Light	Released: 6 May 2016; Label: ABC Music, UMA (4777432); Format: CD	20	2
Brave & the Broken	Released: 17 August 2018; Label: ABC Music, UMA (6768411); Format: CD, digital	15	1
Wreck Me	Released: 31 July 2020; Label: ABC Music, UMA (0721453); Format: CD, digital	8	1
Any Less Anymore	Released: 16 June 2023; Label: ABC Music (ABCC0024); Format: CD, digital	3	1
The Band Album	Released: 28 March 2025; Label: ABC Music; Format: CD, digital	29	3

=== Re-recorded albums ===
List of re-recorded, with release date and label shown
Title	Album details
Wreck Me (Acoustic Sessions)	Released: 4 December 2020; Label: ABC Music, UMA; Format: Digital

=== Extended plays ===
List of extended plays, with release date and label shown
Title	Album details	Peak chart positions	
Title	Album details	AUS	AUS Country
Our Backyard (with Amber Lawrence)	Released: 4 August 2017; Label: ABC Music, Universal Music Australia (UMA) (5780098); Format:	40	2

== Awards and nominations ==
=== AIR Awards ===
The Australian Independent Record Awards (known colloquially as the AIR Awards) is an annual awards night to recognise, promote and celebrate the success of Australia's Independent Music sector.

Year	Nominee / work	Award	Result	Ref.
2021	Wreck Me	Best Independent Country Album or EP	Nominated	
2024	Any Less Anymore	Best Independent Country Album or EP	Nominated	

=== APRA Awards ===
The APRA Awards are held in Australia and New Zealand by the Australasian Performing Right Association to recognise songwriting skills, sales and airplay performance by its members annually. Collins has been nominated for two awards.

Year	Nominee / work	Award	Result	Ref.
2017	"Call Me Crazy"	Country Work of the Year	Nominated	
2020	"Happy"	Most Performed Country Work of the Year	Nominated	
2026	"Dirty Money"	Most Performed Country Work of the Year	Nominated	

=== ARIA Music Awards ===
The ARIA Music Awards is an annual awards ceremony that recognises excellence, innovation, and achievement across all genres of Australian music.

Year	Nominee / work	Award	Result	Ref.
2018	Brave & The Broken	Best Country Album	Nominated	
2020	Wreck Me	Best Country Album	Nominated	

=== CMC Awards ===
The CMC Awards are awarded annually by Country Music Channel Australia.

Year	Nominee / work	Award	Result	Ref.
2017	Travis Collins	Male Artist of the Year	Won	
2017	Travis Collins	Australian Artist of the Year	Won	
2017	Travis Collins "Call Me Crazy"	Video of the Year	Won	
2018	Travis Collins	Male Artist of the Year	Won	
2018	Travis Collins	Australian Artist of the Year	Nominated	
2018	Travis Collins "Hometown Calling"	Australian Video of the Year	Nominated	
2018	Travis Collins and Amber Lawrence	Group or Duo of the Year	Nominated	

=== Country Music Awards of Australia (CMAA) ===
Collins has won eight awards at the Country Music Awards of Australia held annually in Tamworth since 1973.

Year	Nominee / work	Award	Result (wins only)	Ref.
2017	Hard Light	Male Vocalist of the Year	Won	
2017	"Call Me Crazy" (Travis Collins, Damien Leith)	APRA AMCOS Song of the Year	Won	
2017	"Just Another Girl"	Single of the Year	Won	
2018	"Our Backyard" (with Amber Lawrence)	Vocal Collaboration of the Year	Won	
2018	"Our Backyard" (Amber Lawrence, Collins, Matt Scullion)	APRA AMCOS Song of the Year	Won	
2018	"Our Backyard" (with Amber Lawrence)	Single of the Year	Won	
2019	Brave & the Broken	Male Vocalist of the Year	Won	
2021	Wreck Me	Male Artist of the Year	Won	
2024	"Runnin' the Country" (with The Wolfe Brothers)	Vocal Collaboration of the Year	Won	
