= Bobby Wills =

Canadian country music singer-songwriter

- Born: Edmonton, Alberta, Canada
- Origin: Calgary, Alberta, Canada
- Genres: Country
- Occupation: Singer-songwriter
- Instrument: Guitar
- Years active: 2010–present
- Labels: On Ramp, MDM Recordings
- Website: http://bobbywills.com/

Bobby Wills is a Canadian country music singer-songwriter. Wills has released five albums – Man with No Past (2010), If It Was That Easy (2012), Crazy Enough (2014), Tougher Than Love (2016) and an EP Longshot Bar & Grill (2019). Many of his singles have made it onto the Billboard Canada Country Chart, including the hits "Somebody Will", "Down by the River", and "Won't You Be Mine", which each peaked at the number 9 spots. In 2013, Wills won the Canadian Country Music Association Rising Star Award.

== Early life ==
Wills was born in Edmonton, Alberta to teenage parents, and was put up for adoption when he was 18 months old. He was soon adopted and raised by a family from Calgary, Alberta. Wills grew up with his adoptive parents and their biological daughter in Oakridge, a southwest Calgary community. Although Wills had an interest in music during his childhood and teenage years, his adoptive family wasn't musical, so he spent more time focusing on athletics like skateboarding and hockey.

When Wills was 18, he registered with an adoption registry with the hopes of being able to connect with his biological family.

Wills began to get into music while on a backpacking trip through Australia in the late 1990s. At an open mic night, Wills' friend bet him $20 that he wouldn't go on stage and sing a song with the band. Wills accepted the bet, sang "The Dance" by Garth Brooks, and received an overwhelmingly positive reaction from the crowd. Wills then decided that he wanted to begin to focus on music, and learned to play guitar while still in Australia.

When Wills returned home from his travels, he discovered that his biological mother had also registered with the adoption agency, and that she was requesting contact with him. When Wills was 20 years old, he met his birth parents and his five biological siblings, and found that there was a big musical streak in his birth family.

== Career ==
=== Musical career ===
After meeting his biological family and discovering that music was in his genes, Wills began to seriously consider pursuing music as a career. He started performing at open mic nights and toured across Canada in a country bar band. He recorded demos in Toronto with Thomas Wade, and then began to split his time between Calgary and Nashville to commit to making country music. While in Nashville, Wills began working with producers Mike Pyle and Walt Aldrige, who helped him develop his craft.

Wills released his debut album, Man with No Past, independently in 2010. It produced four singles, including "A Little More Time", which made it onto the Billboard Country Top 40 Chart.

In 2012, Wills signed with On Ramp Records. His second album, If It Was That Easy, was released in November 2012 and distributed by EMI. His single "Somebody Will" peaked at No. 9 on the Billboard Canada Country Chart and at No. 91 on the Billboard Canadian Hot 100 Chart.

He began to gain acclaim during the 2013 awards season when he was nominated for three Canadian Country Music Association Awards and went on to win the CCMA Rising Star Award.

In 2014, Wills released his third album, Crazy Enough, which was recorded entirely at the Music Centre Canada studio in his hometown of Calgary. The singles "Crazy Enough" and "Never Didn't Love You" peaked at No. 13 and No. 14 respectively on the Billboard Canada Country Chart, and at No. 76 and No. 75 respectively on the Billboard Canadian Hot 100 Chart.

In 2016, he released his fourth album, Tougher Than Love, which he penned while on his Crazy Enough tour. The singles "Won't You Be Mine" and "Down by the River" climbed to the No. 9 spots on the Billboard Canada Country Chart, and his current single "Tougher Than Love" peaked at No. 11. To this day, along with his stage name Bobby Wills, he is known as Robert Blough. He works at Honda West as their General Sales Manager

=== Artistry ===
Wills' music is stylistically diverse – while it's rooted in a classic country sound, some of his tracks have rock influences, some have more of a funk appeal, and others are reminiscent of 70's and 80's country crossovers. Wills cites Garth Brooks, George Strait, Keith Whitley, Waylon Jennings, Lefty Frizzel, and Merle Haggard among his musical influences. He believes he got his passion for country music from his adoptive father, who was a big country music fan and listened to country music frequently at home while Wills was growing up.

=== Philanthropy ===
Wills is a committed humanitarian who acts as an Ambassador for the Adoption Council of Canada. He also supports the Canadian Museum for Human Rights, and during the 2014 Golden Globe awards weekend, he gave a charitable performance at the Oh Canada Cocktail Party to support the Friends of the Canadian Museum for Human Rights.

== Personal life ==
Wills currently lives in Calgary with his wife and children. He is the founder of the country music label Willing Records, distributed by Universal Music Canada.

== Discography ==
=== Studio albums ===
Title	Details
Man with No Past	Release date: August 16, 2010; Label: Willin' Entertainment
If It Was That Easy	Release date: November 6, 2012; Label: On Ramp Records
Crazy Enough	Release date: June 24, 2014; Label: MDM Recordings
Longneck Bar and Grill	Release date: October 25, 2019; Label: MDM Recordings

=== Extended plays ===
Title	Details
Tougher Than Love	Release date: March 18, 2016; Label: MDM Recordings
In Comes the Night	Release date: September 8, 2017; Label: MDM Recordings

=== Singles ===
Year	Single	Peak chart positions		Album
Year	Single	CAN Country	CAN	Album
2010	"Second Chances"	—	—	Man with No Past
2010	"My Memory Ain't What It Used to Be"	—	—	Man with No Past
2011	"Man with No Past"	—	—	Man with No Past
2011	"A Little More Time"	45	—	Man with No Past
2012	"Show Some Respect"	8	—	If It Was That Easy
2012	"Somebody Will"	9	91	If It Was That Easy
2013	"If It Was That Easy"	24	—	If It Was That Easy
2013	"When It Comes to You"	22	—	If It Was That Easy
2014	"Crazy Enough"	13	76	Crazy Enough
2014	"Never Didn't Love You"	14	75	Crazy Enough
2014	"Undressed"	13	—	Crazy Enough
2015	"So Much for Taking It Slow"	38	—	Crazy Enough
2015	"Won't You Be Mine"	9	—	Tougher Than Love
2016	"Down by the River"	9	—	Tougher Than Love
2016	"Tougher Than Love"	11	—	Tougher Than Love
2017	"Get While the Gettin's Good"	19	—	In Comes the Night
2017	"In Comes the Night"	35	—	In Comes the Night
2018	"Out of Your Mind"	—	—	In Comes the Night
2018	"Won't You Be Mine" (US release)	—	—	Non-album single
2019	"Raise The Bar"	—	—	Longneck Bar and Grill
2019	"It Matters To Her"	—	—	Longneck Bar and Grill
2019	"Bad Things Good People"	—	—	Longneck Bar and Grill
2020	"Wash My Truck"	—	—	Non-album single
2020	"Gettin' Her Over You"	—	—	Non-album single
2021	"Pretty Good Tonight"	—	—	Non-album single
2022	"Closest Ocean"	—	—	Non-album single
"—" denotes releases that did not chart

=== Music videos ===
Year	Video	Director
2012	"Show Some Respect"	Troy Niemans
2012	"Somebody Will"	Troy Niemans
2013	"If It Was That Easy"	Troy Niemans
2014	"Crazy Enough"	Stephano Barberis
2014	"Undressed"	Stephano Barberis
2015	"Never Didn't Love You"	Brian Lazzaro
2015	"So Much for Taking It Slow"	Stephano Barberis
2016	"Down by the River"	
2016	"Tougher Than Love"	
2017	"Get While The Gettin's Good"	
2017	"In Comes The Night"	

== Awards and nominations ==
Year	Association	Category	Nominated work	Result
2013	Canadian Country Music Association	Male Artist of the Year	—	Nominated
2013	Canadian Country Music Association	Rising Star	—	Won
2013	Canadian Country Music Association	Single of the Year	"Show Some Respect"	Nominated
2014	Canadian Country Music Association	Male Artist of the Year	—	Nominated
2015	Canadian Country Music Association	Songwriter of the Year	"Never Didn't Love You"	Nominated
2016	Canadian Country Music Association	Album of the Year	Tougher Than Love	Nominated
2016	Canadian Country Music Association	Single of the Year	"Won't You Be Mine"	Nominated
2016	Canadian Country Music Association	Songwriter of the Year	"Won't You Be Mine"	Nominated
2016	Alberta Country Music Awards	Male Artist of the Year	—	Won
2016	Alberta Country Music Awards	Fan's Choice	—	Won
2016	Alberta Country Music Awards	Single of the Year	"Down By The River"	Nominated
2016	Alberta Country Music Awards	Single of the Year	"Won't You Be Mine"	Nominated
2024	Canadian Country Music Association	Industry Person of the Year	—	Nominated
