= I Would Be Over Me Too =

2020 song by Tyler Joe Miller

Single by Tyler Joe Miller

from the EP Sometimes I Don't, But Sometimes I Do
- Released: June 5, 2020
- Genre: Country
- Length: 3:20
- Label: MDM
- Songwriters: Tyler Joe Miller; Kelly Archer; Mitch Merrett
- Producer: Danick Dupelle

Tyler Joe Miller singles chronology
| "Pillow Talkin'" (2019) | "I Would Be Over Me Too" (2020) | "Fighting" (2020) |

Music video
- "I Would Be Over Me Too" on YouTube

"I Would Be Over Me Too" is a song co-written and recorded by Canadian country music artist Tyler Joe Miller. The track was co-written with Kelly Archer and Mitch Merrett. The song became the second single off Miller's debut extended play Sometimes I Don't, But Sometimes I Do.

== Critical reception ==
CMT stated:

"Miller cites Brad Paisley, Alan Jackson, and Garth Brooks as among his [favourite] artists — all of whom can tell a story with a little bit of humor in the mix. If you’re not over them, you’ll probably want to take a look at "I Would Be Over Me Too""

== Commercial performance ==
"I Would Be Over Me Too" reached a peak of #1 on the Billboard Canada Country chart dated October 31, 2020. This made Miller the first independent artist in the history of the chart to debut with consecutive #1 singles (after "Pillow Talkin'"), and gave him his first chart-topper as a songwriter. The song also reached a peak of #63 on the Canadian Hot 100 in the same week. It has been certified Gold by Music Canada.

== Music video ==
The music video for "I Would Be Over Me Too" premiered on September 17, 2020. It features Miller singing the song while continuously running into an ex who never seems to notice him.

== Charts ==
| Chart (2020) | Peak position |
|---|---|
| Canadian Hot 100 (Billboard) | 63 |
| Canada Country (Billboard) | 1 |

== Certifications ==
| Region | Certification | Certified units/sales |
|---|---|---|
| Canada (Music Canada) | Gold | 40,000^{‡} |
^{‡} Sales+streaming figures based on certification alone.
