= Cheap Wine and Cigarettes =

Single by Jess Moskaluke

from the album Light Up the Night
- Released: March 18, 2014
- Genre: Country
- Length: 2:43
- Label: MDM Recordings
- Songwriters: Cary Barlowe; Hillary Lindsey
- Producer: Corey Crowder

Jess Moskaluke singles chronology
"Good Lovin'" (2013)	"Cheap Wine and Cigarettes" (2014)	"Used" (2014)

"Cheap Wine and Cigarettes" is a song written by Cary Barlowe and Hillary Lindsey and recorded by Canadian country pop singer Jess Moskaluke for her debut studio album, Light Up the Night (2014). It was released via MDM Recordings on March 18, 2014 as the second single off the album. Met with positive critical and commercial success, the song became Moskaluke's first to chart on the Canadian Hot 100 (and then to reach the top 50), as well as her first to be certified by Music Canada.

== Content ==
"Cheap Wine and Cigarettes" is a midtempo country song with influences of country pop that describes an unhealthy relationship which the lyrics compare to an addiction. The titular drugs are used as a metaphor for the narrator's self-destructive habits, allowing her lover to get her "high" and then "leave [her] a mess."

== Music video ==
The official music video for "Cheap Wine and Cigarettes" was filmed live at CMT Canada; it was directed by Joel Stewart and premiered April 1, 2014.

== Commercial performance ==
In its first week of release, "Cheap Wine and Cigarettes" was the most-added song on Canadian country radio. Aided by this warm reception, the song debuted at number 39 on the Billboard Canada Country airplay chart, where it eventually reached a peak of 11. Its local success led to the song being picked up by SiriusXM radio station "The Highway", which broadcasts in both Canada and the United States.

"Cheap Wine and Cigarettes" debuted at number 82 on the Billboard Canadian Hot 100 for the chart issued May 3, 2014. It reached a peak position of 48 for one week on the chart issued May 31, 2014.

In August 2014, the song was certified Gold by Music Canada, indicating sales of 40,000 units or more. In doing so, "Cheap Wine and Cigarettes" became the first certified single for her label MDM Recordings and Moskaluke became the first female Canadian artist to attain a Gold record since Shania Twain, who last achieved the feat in 2004 with "Party for Two". The song was later certified Platinum in November 2016 with sales of over 80,000.

== Charts and certifications ==
=== Weekly charts ===
Chart (2014)	Peak position
Canada Hot 100 (Billboard)	48
Canada Country (Billboard)	11

=== Certifications ===
Region	Certification	Certified units/sales
Canada (Music Canada)	Platinum	80,000^{*}
^{*} Sales figures based on certification alone.
