= Ryan Lindsay (singer) =

Canadian musician

- Born: 1993 (age 32–33)
- Origin: Wainwright, Alberta, Canada
- Genre: Country
- Occupation: Musician
- Instruments: Guitar, Harmonica
- Website: ryanlindsaymusic.com

Ryan Lindsay (born 1993) is a Canadian country music artist. He has played at major country music festivals such as the Calgary Stampede and Country Thunder in Calgary.

Lindsay's main influences include 1990s country music.

== Early life ==
Ryan Lindsay was raised in Wainwright, Alberta.

Lindsay began playing shows as early as 15 years of age. Lindsay took a degree in Outdoor Education in Camrose at the University of Alberta, worked as a backcountry guide and traveled extensively across the Northern Arctic of Canada and Greenland before pursuing a career in music.

== Career ==
At the age of 15, Lindsay began performing as a country music artist. He began playing professionally when he was 19, fronting a bar band. Lindsay became a solo artist in 2017.

Lindsay's main influences include 1990s country music.

In 2018, Lindsay was named Rising Star by a local radio station, Country 105. The following year, he released his first independently released EP, Wild and at the 2019 Alberta Country Music Awards, Lindsay won an ACMA for Rising Star.

Lindsay released his second EP titled “The Ride” in 2020. It won album of the year at the Country Music Alberta Awards, where Lindsay also received an award for Horizon Male artist.

== Community involvement ==
Lindsay helped found the Spirit of the Land Foundation, which had started off at the University of Alberta at Camrose as an organization focused on community-based farm projects.

Following a fire during training at CFB Wainwright, on October 17, 2026, Lindsay organized a consort at Wallace Park to benefit local first responders & health services staff who tended to the injured soldiers. Ryan Lindsay Music partnered with the local Rotary Club & Wainwright & District Community Health Foundation to receive donations. The outdoor event, on October 22, 2026, raised more than $50,000.00 that the WDCHF has and will continue to disburse funds as intended.

== Awards and nominations ==
Year	Association	Category	Nominated work	Result	Ref
2021	Canadian Country Music Association	Alternative Country Album of the Year	The Ride	Nominated	
