= Tyler Joe Miller =

Canadian country singer

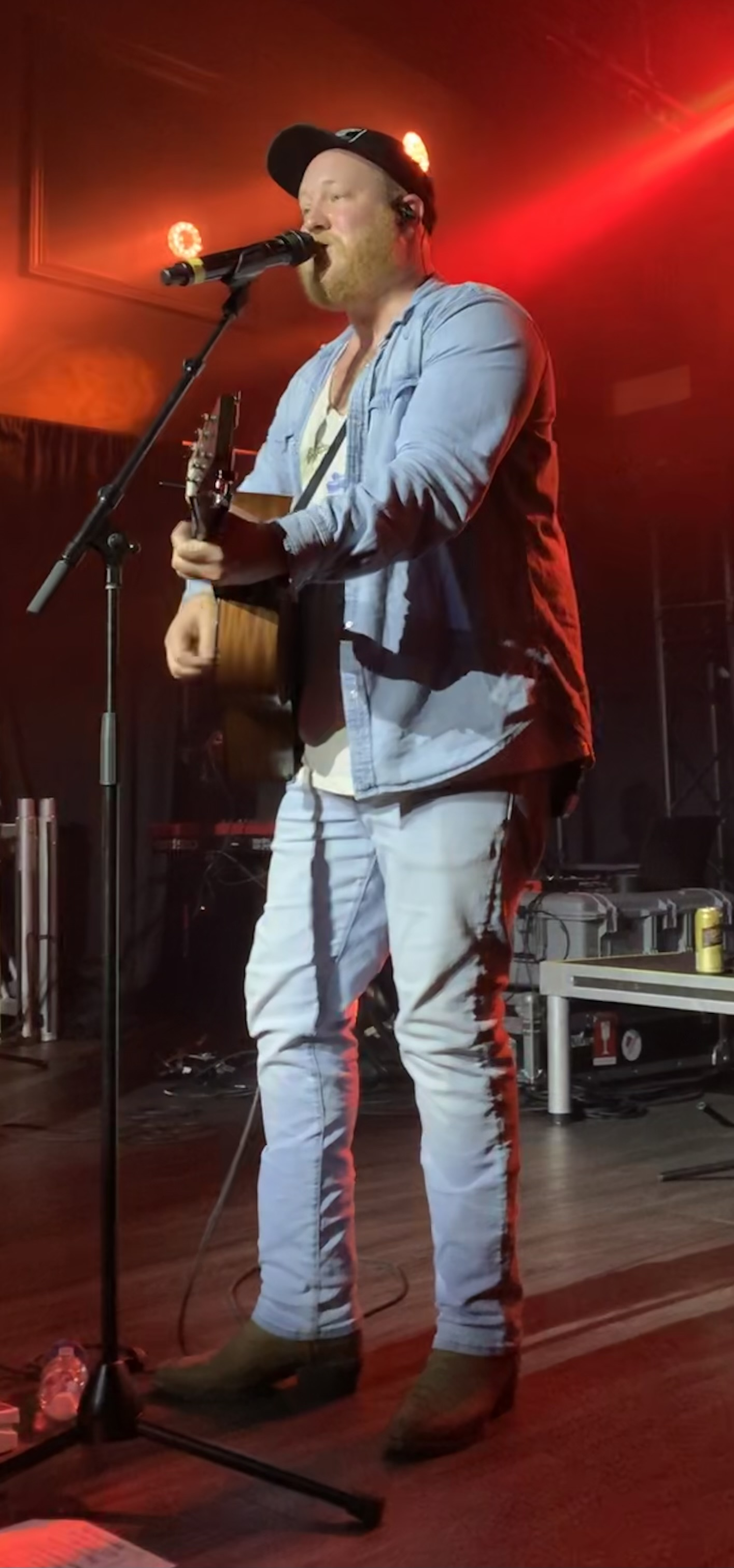

Background information
- Born: Surrey, British Columbia, Canada
- Genres: Country; neotraditional country
- Occupations: Singer; songwriter
- Years active: 2018–present
- Labels: TJM; The Orchard; MDM
- Website: tylerjoemiller.com

Tyler Joe Miller is a Canadian country singer. He was the first independent artist to debut with back-to-back No. 1 hits on the Billboard Canada Country chart with "Pillow Talkin'" and "I Would Be Over Me Too". Miller has released one album Spillin' My Truth (2023), and two extended plays Sometimes I Don't, But Sometimes I Do (2020) and Going Home (2024).

== Biography ==
Miller was born in Surrey, British Columbia. He liked acting when he was younger, before he began to play the guitar. In 2019, Miller won the BC Country Music Association's Ray McAuley Horizon Award. Miller cites Brad Paisley, Alan Jackson, Kenny Rogers, George Strait, and Garth Brooks as influences on his music.

On Christmas Day 2019, Miller released his debut single "Pillow Talkin'". The song reached No. 1 on the Billboard Canada Country chart, making Miller the first independently signed artist to top the chart with his debut single. It also became Miller's first Gold-certified single. In June 2020, Miller released his second single "I Would Be Over Me Too". Miller was then selected as a semi-finalist in the SiriusXM Top of the Country competition. In October, "I Would Be Over Me Too" would also reach No. 1 on the Canada Country chart, handing Miller his second consecutive chart-topper, and first as a songwriter. In November 2020, Miller released his debut extended play Sometimes I Don't, But Sometimes I Do, which featured his first two singles as well as his the singles, "Fighting" and "Sometimes I Do". In November 2021, Miller was named the winner of the SiriusXM "Top of the Country" competition.

Miller released the single "Wild as Her" in February 2022. He followed that up with the release of "Never Met a Beer" in August 2022, a collaboration with fellow Canadian country artist Matt Lang. In February 2023, he released the single "Back to Drinkin' Whiskey". In April 2023, Miller released the track "I Know Jack", which was later included on his acoustic extended play The Band's Packed Up that was released on May 19, 2023. The tracks from the extended play were included on Miller's album Spillin' My Truth, released on August 25, 2023. The album also includes the single "Shoulda Known Better".

In January 2024, Miller signed a management deal with RLive, a division of Republic Live, as their flagship signing. In February 2024, he signed a distribution deal with The Orchard, and released the single "Broken Man" in March 2024. In the spring of 2024, Miller embarked on "The Country Mixtape Tour" across Canada as a co-headliner alongside Shawn Austin and Andrew Hyatt. In August 2024, he released the single "What Good Is a Memory". The song was included on his October 2024 extended play Going Home. Miller was nominated for three awards — Album of the Year, Fans' Choice, and Male Artist of the Year — at the 2025 Canadian Country Music Association Awards.

== Personal life ==
Miller is a carpenter and painter by trade. He owns a non-profit organization called The Climb Outreach Society, which provides housing, drinking water sources, as well as emergency food funds and healthcare for newborn babies in Central and South America.

== Discography ==
=== Studio albums ===
Title	Details
Spillin' My Truth	Release date: August 25, 2023; Label: MDM; Format: Digital download, streaming

=== Extended plays ===
Title	Details
Sometimes I Don't, But Sometimes I Do	Release date: November 6, 2020; Label: MDM; Format: CD, digital download, streaming
The Band's Packed Up	Release date: May 19, 2023; Label: MDM; Format: Digital download, streaming
Going Home	Release date: October 25, 2024; Label: Tyler Joe Miller Music Inc.; Format: Digital download, streaming

=== Singles ===
Year	Title	Peak positions		Certifications	Album
Year	Title	CAN	CAN Country	Certifications	Album
2019	"Pillow Talkin'"	70	1	MC: Gold	Sometimes I Don't, But Sometimes I Do
2020	"I Would Be Over Me Too"	63	1	MC: Gold	Sometimes I Don't, But Sometimes I Do
2020	"Fighting"	85	8		Sometimes I Don't, But Sometimes I Do
2021	"Sometimes I Do"	86	5		Sometimes I Don't, But Sometimes I Do
2022	"Wild as Her"	94	8	MC: Gold	Spillin' My Truth
2022	"Never Met a Beer" (with Matt Lang)	—	10		Spillin' My Truth
2023	"Back to Drinkin' Whiskey"	—	9		Spillin' My Truth
2023	"Shoulda Known Better"	—	11		Spillin' My Truth
2024	"Broken Man"	—	10		Going Home
2024	"What Good Is a Memory"	—	5		Going Home
2025	"Doin' What She Does"	—	7		TBA
2026	"Under the Influence"	—	7		TBA

=== Promotional singles ===
Year	Single	Album
2023	"I Know Jack"	The Band's Packed Up
2024	"Takes Me Back"	Going Home
2025	"Good Run"	TBA

=== Music videos ===
Year	Video	Video
2020	"I Would Be Over Me Too"	Carl Sheldon
2021	"Fighting"	Carl Sheldon
2021	"Sometimes I Do"	
2022	"Wild as Her"	David J. Redman
2022	"Never Met a Beer"	
2023	"Back to Drinkin' Whiskey"	Ryan Nolan
2023	"Shoulda Known Better"	Carl Sheldon

== Awards and nominations ==
Year	Association	Category	Nominated work	Result	Ref
2019	British Columbia Country Music Association	Ray McCauley Horizon Award	—N/a	Won	
2020	British Columbia Country Music Association	Male Artist of the Year	—N/a	Won	
2020	British Columbia Country Music Association	Single of the Year	"Pillow Talkin'"	Won	
2020	Canadian Country Music Association	Rising Star Award	—N/a	Nominated	
2021	Canadian Country Music Association	Album of the Year	Sometimes I Don't, But Sometimes I Do	Nominated	
2021	Canadian Country Music Association	Fans’ Choice Award	—N/a	Nominated	
2021	Canadian Country Music Association	Male Artist Of The Year	—N/a	Nominated	
2021	Canadian Country Music Association	Rising Star Award	—N/a	Nominated	
2022	British Columbia Country Music Association	Album of the Year	Sometimes I Don't, But Sometimes I Do	Won	
2022	British Columbia Country Music Association	Entertainer of the Year	—N/a	Nominated	
2022	British Columbia Country Music Association	Male Artist of the Year	—N/a	Nominated	
2022	British Columbia Country Music Association	Single of the Year	"Sometimes I Do"	Won	
2022	British Columbia Country Music Association	Songwriter of the Year	—N/a	Won	
2022	Canadian Country Music Association	Fans' Choice	—N/a	Nominated	
2022	Canadian Country Music Association	Male Artist of the Year	—N/a	Nominated	
2023	Canadian Country Music Association	Musical Collaboration of the Year	"Never Met a Beer" (with Matt Lang)	Nominated	
2023	Canadian Country Music Association	Single of the Year	"Wild as Her"	Nominated	
2023	Canadian Country Music Association	Songwriter(s) of the Year	"Back to Drinkin' Whiskey" (with Kelly Archer, Danick Dupelle)	Nominated	
2023	Canadian Country Music Association	Video of the Year	"Back to Drinkin' Whiskey"	Nominated	
2024	Juno Awards	Country Album of the Year	Spillin' My Truth	Nominated	
2024	Canadian Country Music Association	Album of the Year	Spillin' My Truth	Nominated	
2024	Canadian Country Music Association	Fans' Choice	—N/a	Nominated	
2025	Juno Awards	Country Album of the Year	Going Home	Nominated	
2025	Canadian Country Music Association	Album of the Year	Going Home	Nominated	
2025	Canadian Country Music Association	Fans' Choice	—N/a	Nominated	
2025	Canadian Country Music Association	Male Artist of the Year	—N/a	Nominated	
