= David James (singer) =

Canadian country pop singer-songwriter

- Born: Winnipeg, Manitoba, Canada
- Genres: Country pop
- Occupation: Singer-songwriter
- Years active: 2013–present
- Labels: MDM
- Website: davidjamesmusic.ca

David James is a Canadian country music singer-songwriter. James was nominated for the 2014 Canadian Country Music Association Discovery Award and 2017 Rising Star Award.

== Career ==
In August 2014, he signed to MDM Recordings Inc. His first single for the label, "What We Weren't Looking For", was released in February 2015. A music video for the song debuted on CMT in March. The song peaked at number 27 on the Billboard Canada Country chart in June. James' second single for MDM, "Some Hearts", was released in September. His third single for the label, "Lonely Girl", was released on March 8, 2016. All three songs are included on an extended play, Songs About a Girl, released on March 11. In 2020, James released the extended play If I Were You, which included the singles "Cars, Girls, And The Radio", "All the Time", and the title track whose co-writers include Tyler Hubbard of Florida Georgia Line and Hardy.

== Discography ==
=== Extended plays ===
Title	Details
This Must Be It	Release date: April 8, 2013; Label: self-released
Songs About a Girl	Release date: March 11, 2016; Label: MDM Recordings Inc.
Downtown Kids	Release date: October 20, 2017; Label: MDM Recordings Inc.
If I Were You	Release date: March 13, 2020; Label: MDM Recordings Inc.

=== Singles ===
Year	Single	Peak positions	Album
Year	Single	CAN Country	Album
2014	"Letting Love Get Reckless"	—	Non-album single
2015	"What We Weren't Looking For"	27	Songs About a Girl
2015	"Some Hearts"	—	Songs About a Girl
2016	"Lonely Girl"	39	Songs About a Girl
2016	"Starts with a Girl"	—	Songs About a Girl
2017	"What If I Don't"	40	Downtown Kids
2017	"Sun Set On It"	12	Downtown Kids
2017	"Downtown Kids"	13	Downtown Kids
2018	"Cars, Girls and the Radio"	37	If I Were You
2019	"All the Time"	24	If I Were You
2020	"If I Were You"	40	If I Were You
2020	"Then There's You" (featuring Genevieve Fisher)	35	If I Were You
2021	"Don't Mind If I Do"	29	Non-album singles
2021	"That's the Life"	42	Non-album singles
2022	"Wreck My Weekend"	—	Non-album singles
2022	"Let Her Go"	—	Non-album singles
"—" denotes releases that did not chart

=== Music videos ===
Year	Video	Director
2013	"Letting Love Get Reckless"	David James
2015	"What We Weren't Looking For"	Amit Dabrai
2015	"Some Hearts"	David James
2016	"Starts with a Girl"	Ben Knechtel
2017	"What If I Don't"	
2017	"Later"	Travis Laidlaw
2017	"Sun Set On It"	David James
2018	"Downtown Kids"	Stephano Barberis
2019	"All the Time"	
2022	"That's the Life"	Travis Didluck
