= Erin Enderlin =

Erin Enderlin is an American Country Music artist and songwriter. Her songs have been recorded by Alan Jackson, Lee Ann Womack, Randy Travis, Reba McEntire and Terri Clark. She has also twice appeared on the Country Throwdown Tour as a member of their Bluebird Cafe songwriter stage.

== Early life ==
Erin Enderlin was born and raised in Conway, Arkansas. She moved to Nashville to attend MTSU and pursue a career as an artist and songwriter.

== Songwriter ==
Enderlin penned Alan Jackson's "Monday Morning Church" which went to number 5 on the Billboard Country Chart in 2004. "Last Call" was recorded by Lee Ann Womack and went to number 14 on the same chart in 2008.

== Artist ==
As an artist, Erin Enderlin has had two albums released, one recorded and produced by Jamey Johnson and Jim "Moose" Brown.
