= Jess Moskaluke =

Canadian country music singer (born 1990)

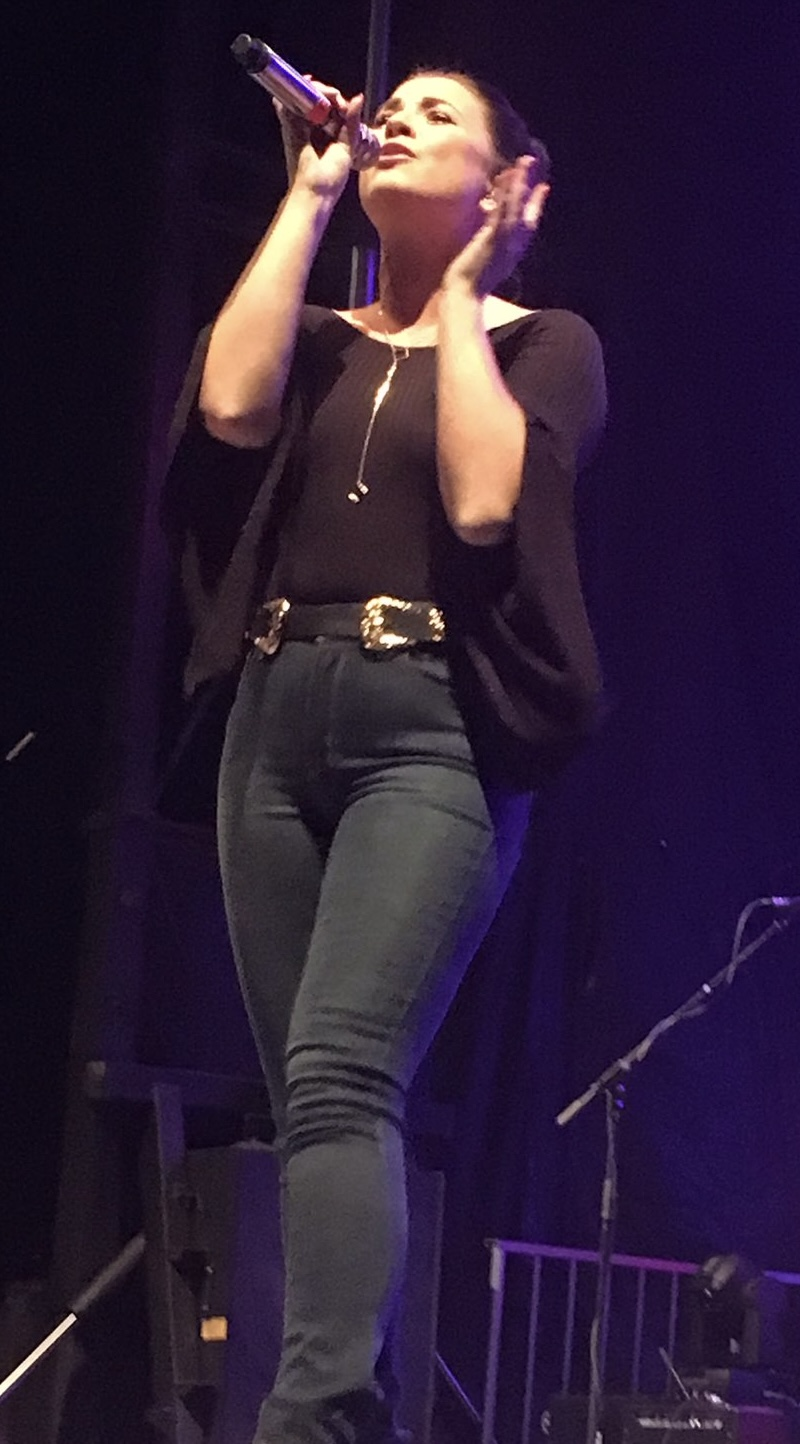
- Moskaluke in 2017

Background information
- Born: June 4, 1990 (age 36); Langenburg, Saskatchewan, Canada
- Genres: Country, country pop
- Occupation: Singer-songwriter
- Years active: 2012–present
- Label: MDM Recordings
- Website: jessmoskaluke.com

Jessica Moskaluke (born June 4, 1990) is a Canadian country singer and songwriter. She released her debut studio album, Light Up the Night in April 2014, which includes the platinum-certified single "Cheap Wine and Cigarettes". She has one number-one hit on the Billboard Canada Country chart with "Country Girls".

== Career ==
In June 2011, Moskaluke won the Next Big Thing contest, sponsored by Big Dog 92.7 and SaskMusic. In September 2011, she won the New Artist Showcase Award at the Canadian Country Music Association Awards. She was chosen to represent Canada at the Global Artist Party at the 2012 CMA Music Festival.

Moskaluke's debut single, "Catch Me If You Can", was released on June 4, 2012. The song's music video received regular airplay on CMT. It was followed by an EP, also titled Catch Me If You Can, which was released on September 4, 2012, by MDM Recordings and distributed by EMI Music Canada. Jeff DeDekker of the Leader-Post gave the EP four stars out of five, writing that "by using the full extent of her voice and also incorporating tenderness and fragility, Moskaluke is able to cover the complete spectrum of material." Casadie Pederson of Top Country also gave the EP four stars out of five, calling Moskaluke "one of the best young talents we've seen in a long time." The EP's second single, "Hit N Run", reached the top 40 on the Billboard Canada Country chart in 2013. Moskaluke was named Female Vocalist of the Year at the 2013 Saskatchewan Country Music Association Awards.

Moskaluke released the first single from her debut studio album, "Good Lovin'", in October 2013. It became her first single to reach the top 20 on the Billboard Canada Country chart. The album, Light Up the Night, was released on April 15, 2014. "Cheap Wine and Cigarettes" and "Used" were both released as singles from the album in 2014.

In February 2021, Moskaluke released her second studio album The Demos, which included her first number-one hit "Country Girls", as well as the singles "Halfway Home", "Mapdot", "Leave Each Other Alone", and "Nothin' I Don't Love About You". On September 29, 2023, she released the extended play Heartbreaker, which included the singles "Knock Off", "Heartbreaker", and "Go Get Er".

In 2025, Moskaluke released the singles "Life for Me" and "I Ain't Country" In the fall of 2025, she embarked on her headlining "Life for Me Tour" across Canada.

== Tours ==
- Mapdot (2022)
- Life For Me Tour (2025)

== Discography ==
=== Studio albums ===
Title	Details
Light Up the Night	Release date: April 15, 2014; Label: MDM Recordings
The Demos	Release date: February 19, 2021; Label: MDM Recordings

=== Compilation albums ===
Title	Details
The Vinyl	Release date: December 4, 2020; Label: MDM Recordings

=== Extended plays ===
Title	Details	Peak positions
Title	Details	CAN
Catch Me If You Can	Release date: September 4, 2012; Label: MDM Recordings	—
Kiss Me Quiet	Release date: September 25, 2015; Label: MDM Recordings	—
Past the Past	Release date: November 3, 2017; Label: MDM Recordings	87
A Small Town Christmas	Release date: October 5, 2018; Label: MDM Recordings	—
Heartbreaker	Release date: September 29, 2023; Label: MDM Recordings	—
"—" denotes releases that did not chart

=== Singles ===
==== As lead artist ====
===== 2010s =====
Year	Title	Peak chart positions		Certifications	Album
Year	Title	CAN	CAN Country	Certifications	Album
2012	"Catch Me If You Can"	—	49		Catch Me If You Can
2013	"Hit N Run"	—	37		Catch Me If You Can
2013	"Everything Falls"	—	—		—N/a
2013	"Good Lovin'"	—	17		Light Up the Night
2014	"Cheap Wine and Cigarettes"	48	11	MC: Platinum	Light Up the Night
2014	"Used"	—	13		Light Up the Night
2015	"Night We Won't Forget"	—	17		Light Up the Night
2015	"Kiss Me Quiet"	—	7	MC: Gold	Kiss Me Quiet
2016	"Take Me Home"	—	7	MC: Gold	Kiss Me Quiet
2016	"Elevator"	—	15		Kiss Me Quiet
2017	"Drive Me Away"	—	3		Past the Past
2017	"Kill Your Love"	—	16		Past the Past
2018	"Past the Past"	—	30		Past the Past
2018	"Camouflage"	—	7		Past the Past
2018	"Save Some of That Whiskey"	—	6		Past the Past
2019	"Country Girls"	— (Note: "Country Girls" did not enter the Canadian Hot 100, but did reach number 31 on the Canadian Digital Song Sales component chart.)	1	MC: Gold	The Demos
"—" denotes releases that did not chart

===== 2020s =====
Year	Title	Peak chart positions		Album
Year	Title	CAN Country	AUS Country	Album
2020	"Halfway Home"	11	4	The Demos
2020	"Mapdot"	15	44	The Demos
2021	"Leave Each Other Alone" (featuring Travis Collins)	35	29	The Demos
2021	"Nothin' I Don't Love About You"	13	—	The Demos
2022	"Knock Off"	6	8	Heartbreaker
2023	"Heartbreaker"	10	30	Heartbreaker
2023	"Go Get Er"	16	1	Heartbreaker
2024	"Secondhand You"	—	29	Heartbreaker
2025	"Life for Me"	13	3	TBA
2025	"I Ain't Country"	35	—	TBA
2026	"Last Rodeo"	47	—	TBA
"—" denotes releases that did not chart or were not released to that territory

==== Christmas singles ====
Year	Title	Peak chart positions	Album
Year	Title	CAN Country	Album
2023	"Counting Down Christmas"	44	A Small Town Christmas (Deluxe)
2023	"White Christmas"	49	A Small Town Christmas (Deluxe)
2023	"Little Drummer Boy"	53	A Small Town Christmas (Deluxe)

==== As featured artist ====
Year	Title	Peak chart positions		Certifications	Album
Year	Title	CAN Country	CAN	Certifications	Album
2012	"Storm Before the Calm" (Eppic featuring Jess Moskaluke)	—	—		Forever Imperfect
2015	"I'm an Open Road" (Paul Brandt featuring Jess Moskaluke)	7	93	MC: Gold	Borderlines
2020	"What the Whiskey Won't Do" (Alan Doyle featuring Jess Moskaluke)	—	—		Rough Side Out
"—" denotes releases that did not chart

=== Music videos ===
Year	Title	Director
2012	"Catch Me If You Can"	Jordan Eady
2012	"Thank God for Christmas"	Antonio Hrynchuk
2012	"Storm Before The Calm"	Tyler Ward
2014	"Cheap Wine and Cigarettes"	Joel Stewart
2014	"Used"	Marc André Debruyne
2014	"O Holy Night" (with The Lovelocks)	Joel Stewart
2015	"Night We Won't Forget"	Amit Dabrai
2015	"I'm an Open Road" (with Paul Brandt)	Sam Ciurdar
2015	"Kiss Me Quiet"	David Tenniswood
2016	"Take Me Home"	David Hustler
2016	"Elevator"	Ben Knechtel
2017	"Drive Me Away"	Ben Knechtel
2017	"Kill Your Love"	Joel Stewart
2018	"Past The Past"	Joel Stewart
2018	"Camouflage"	Wes Mack
2019	"Save Some Of That Whisky"	Ben Knechtel
2020	"Country Girls"	Stephano Barberis
2020	"Halfway Home"	
2020	"Mapdot"	Tanner Goetz
2021	"Leave Each Other Alone" (with Travis Collins)	Tanner Goetz
2021	"Nothin' I Don't Love About You"	
2022	"Knock Off"	Travis Nesbitt
2023	"Heartbreaker"	Andrew Freedom Parry
2025	"Life for Me"	Ryan Nolan

== Awards and nominations ==
Jess Moskaluke awards and nominations
Awards and nominations
Award	Wins	Nominations
Canadian Country Music Awards	5	23
Juno Awards	0	4
Saskatchewan Country Music Awards	16	17
Saskatchewan Music Awards	2	2
Western Canadian Music Awards	2	4

Totals (Note: Certain award groups do not simply award one winner. They acknowledge several different recipients, have runners-up, and have third place. Since this is a specific recognition and is different from losing an award, runner-up mentions are considered wins in this award tally. For simplification and to avoid errors, each award in this list has been presumed to have had a prior nomination.)
- Wins: 25
- Nominations: 50

Year	Award	Nominated work	Category	Result	Ref.
2013	Saskatchewan Country Music Awards	Herself	Female Vocalist of the Year	Won	
2014	Canadian Country Music Awards	Herself	Female Artist of the Year	Won	
2014	Canadian Country Music Awards	Herself	Rising Star	Nominated	
2014	Canadian Country Music Awards	Herself	Interactive Artist of the Year	Nominated	
2014	Saskatchewan Country Music Awards	Herself	Female Vocalist of the Year	Won	
2014	Saskatchewan Country Music Awards	"Good Lovin'"	Single of the Year	Won	
2015	Juno Awards	Herself	Breakthrough Artist of the Year	Nominated	
2015	Juno Awards	Light Up the Night	Country Album of the Year	Nominated	
2015	Canadian Country Music Awards	Herself	Female Artist of the Year	Won	
2015	Canadian Country Music Awards	Light Up the Night	Album of the Year	Nominated	
2015	Canadian Country Music Awards	"Cheap Wine and Cigarettes"	Single of the Year	Nominated	
2015	Saskatchewan Country Music Awards	Herself	Fan’s Choice Entertainer of the Year	Won	
2015	Saskatchewan Country Music Awards	Herself	Female Vocalist of the Year	Won	
2015	Saskatchewan Country Music Awards	"Cheap Wine and Cigarettes	Single of the Year	Won	
2015	Saskatchewan Country Music Awards	"Used"	Video of the Year	Won	
2015	Saskatchewan Country Music Awards	Light Up the Night	Album of the Year	Won	
2016	Canadian Country Music Awards	Herself	Female Artist of the Year	Won	
2016	Saskatchewan Country Music Awards	Herself (shared with Darlene Tuleta)	Female Vocalist of the Year	Won	
2016	Saskatchewan Country Music Awards	"Kiss Me Quiet"	Single of the Year	Won	
2017	Juno Awards	Country Album of the Year	Kiss Me Quiet	Won	
2017	Canadian Country Music Awards	Herself	Female Artist of the Year	Nominated	
2017	Canadian Country Music Awards	"Take Me Home"	Single of the Year	Nominated	
2017	Saskatchewan Country Music Awards	Herself	Fan's Choice Entertainer of the Year	Won	
2017	Saskatchewan Country Music Awards	Herself	Female Vocalist of the Year	Won	
2017	Saskatchewan Country Music Awards	"Take Me Home" (shared with Kelly Archer and Emily Shackleton)	Song of the Year (Composer)	Won	
2017	Saskatchewan Country Music Awards	"Take Me Home"	Single of the Year	Won	
2017	Saskatchewan Country Music Awards	"Take Me Home"	Video of the Year	Won	
2018	Canadian Country Music Awards	Album of the Year	Past the Past	Won	
2018	Canadian Country Music Awards	Herself	Fan's Choice Award	Nominated	
2018	Canadian Country Music Awards	Herself	Female Artist of the Year	Nominated	
2018	Canadian Country Music Awards	"Drive Me Away"	Single of the Year	Nominated	
2018	Canadian Country Music Awards	"Drive Me Away"	Video of the Year	Nominated	
2018	Canadian Country Music Awards	Herself (shared with Zach Abend and Corey Crowder)	Songwriter of the Year	Nominated	
2018	Saskatchewan Country Music Awards	Herself	Award of Achievement	Won	
2018	Saskatchewan Music Awards	Herself	Country Artist of the Year	Won	
2018	Western Canadian Music Awards	Herself	Country Artist of the Year	Won	
2019	Juno Awards	A Small Town Christmas	Country Album of the Year	Nominated	
2019	Canadian Country Music Awards	Herself	Female Artist of the Year	Nominated	
2019	Canadian Country Music Awards	Herself (shared with Jared Mullins and Corey Crowder)	Songwriter of the Year	Nominated	
2019	Canadian Country Music Awards	"Camouflage"	Video of the Year	Nominated	
2020	Canadian Country Music Awards	Herself	Female Artist of the Year	Nominated	
2020	Saskatchewan Country Music Awards	"Save Some of That Whiskey"	Single of the Year	Nominated	
2020	Western Canadian Music Awards	Herself	Country Artist of the Year	Won	
2021	Western Canadian Music Awards	Herself	Country Artist of the Year	Nominated	
2021	Canadian Country Music Awards	The Demos	Album of the Year	Nominated	
2021	Canadian Country Music Awards	Herself	Female Artist of the Year	Nominated	
2021	Canadian Country Music Awards	"Mapdot" (shared with Zac Abend and Liz Rose)	Songwriter of the Year	Nominated	
2021	Canadian Country Music Awards	"Mapdot"	Video of the Year	Nominated	
2021	Saskatchewan Music Awards	Herself	Country Artist of the Year	Won	
2022	Western Canadian Music Awards	Herself	Country Artist of the Year	Pending	
2025	Canadian Country Music Association	Herself	Female Artist of the Year	Nominated	
2025	Canadian Country Music Association	"Life for Me"	Video of the Year	Nominated	
