= MDM Recordings =

Canadian record label

- Founded: 2008
- Founder: Mike Denney
- Distributor: ADA Canada
- Genre: Country
- Country of origin: Canada
- Location: Toronto, Ontario
- Official website: http://www.mdmrecordings.net

MDM Recordings Inc. is a Canadian independent record label, distributor and artist management company founded by 2014 Canadian Country Music Association Record Company Person of the Year Mike Denney and distributed through ADA Canada, a division of Warner Music Group.

Founded in 2008 and based in Toronto, Ontario, MDM Recordings works primarily with Canadian Country music artists such as Juno Award nominee Chad Brownlee, 2014 CCMA Female Artist of the Year Jess Moskaluke and 2014 CCMA Discovery Award winners The Lovelocks.

MDM Recordings partnered with award-winning producer/musician Mitch Merrett in 2009, and launched new music publishing business Little Red Bungalow in partnership with CCS Rights Management in 2012. In 2014, MDM Recordings expanded operations to Australia with a new partnership with the Maven Agency (distributed by Sony Music Australia) as well as the United States through the addition of Nashville-based representative Chad Green.

In August 2014, Jess Moskaluke's single "Cheap Wine and Cigarettes" was certified Gold by Music Canada, marking a first for MDM Recordings, and making her the first solo female Canadian Country artist to achieve this milestone since Shania Twain.

In October 2014, MDM Recordings announced the first cross-Canada tour composed entirely of MDM Recordings artists. Chad Brownlee's headlining "When The Lights Go Down Tour", supported by Jess Moskaluke and Bobby Wills, travelled coast-to-coast beginning in March 2015.

== Artists ==
- Charlie Major
- Jess Moskaluke
- The Redhill Valleys
- Savannah Jade
- Josh Stumpf

== Past artists ==
- Don Amero
- Black Whiskey Mountain Rebellion
- Chad Brownlee
- Tim Chaisson
- Five Roses
- Hayley
- David James
- The Lovelocks
- Beverley Mahood
- Tyler Joe Miller
- Bryce Pallister
- Bobby Wills
