= Hearts on Fire =

Hearts on Fire may refer to:

== Albums ==
- Hearts on Fire (Baker Gurvitz Army album), or the title song, 1976
- Hearts on Fire (Colin James album), or the title song, 2015
- Hearts on Fire (Noel Pagan album), or the title song, 1993
- Hearts on Fire (EP), or the title song (see below), by Chad Brownlee, 2016
- Hearts on Fire, by Jetty Road, 2015
- Hearts on Fire, by Patsy Watchorn, 2003

== Songs ==
- "Hearts on Fire" (Bryan Adams song), 1987
- "Hearts on Fire" (Chad Brownlee song), 2015
- "Hearts on Fire" (The Common Linnets song), 2015
- "Hearts on Fire" (Cut Copy song), 2008
- "Hearts on Fire" (Eddie Rabbitt song), 1978
- "Hearts on Fire" (HammerFall song), 2002
- "Hearts on Fire" (Illenium, Dabin and Lights song), 2020
- "Hearts on Fire" (Steve Winwood song), 1988
- "Heart's on Fire" (John Cafferty song), 1985 song used in the film Rocky IV
- "Heart's on Fire" (Passenger song), 2014
- "Hearts on Fire", by Genesis, B-side of the single "Jesus He Knows Me"
- "Hearts on Fire", by Randy Meisner from One More Song
- "Hearts on Fire", by Walter Egan

== Companies ==
- Hearts on Fire (company), an American diamond manufacturer and jewellery design company

== See also ==
- Heart on Fire (disambiguation)
- Hearts Aflame (disambiguation)
- Hearts Afire, an American sitcom
