= Money on You =

"Money on You" may refer to:

- "Money on You" (Chris Blue song), 2017
- "Money on You" (Chad Brownlee song), 2020
