= Back in the Game (Chad Brownlee album) =

Studio album by Chad Brownlee
- Released: June 21, 2019 (EP); January 10, 2020 (album)
- Genre: Country; country pop
- Length: 22:50 (EP); 35:20 (album)
- Label: Universal Music Canada
- Producer: Todd Clark; Ben Glover; Ian Smith; Gavin Slate

Chad Brownlee chronology
Hearts on Fire (2016)	Back in the Game (2019)	Reason to Love (TBA)

Singles from Back in the Game
- 1. "Dear Drunk Me" Released: August 13, 2018; 2. "Forever's Gotta Start Somewhere" Released: January 4, 2019; 3. "The Way You Roll" Released: June 21, 2019

"Back in the Game (Deluxe Edition)"
- Deluxe edition cover

Singles from Back in the Game (Deluxe Edition)
- 1. "Money On You" Released: January 10, 2020

Back in the Game is an album by Canadian country music artist Chad Brownlee. It was released on June 21, 2019 via Universal Music Canada. It includes the #1 hit "Forever's Gotta Start Somewhere", as well as the singles "Dear Drunk Me" and "The Way You Roll". A deluxe edition featuring the single "Money On You" was released on January 10, 2020.

== Track listing (EP) ==
Back in the Game
No.	Title	Writer(s)	Length
1.	"Back in the Game"	Gavin Slate; Ian Smith; Todd Clark; Travis Wood	3:02
2.	"The Way You Roll"	Chad Brownlee; Gordie Sampson; Thomas Salter	2:54
3.	"My Revival"	Brownlee; Ben Glover; Dave Thomson; Hayley McLean	3:24
4.	"This Old Guitar"	Brownlee	3:43
5.	"Forever's Gotta Start Somewhere"	Cary Barlowe; Donovan Woods; Clark	3:09
6.	"Bourbon"	Brownlee; Glover; Tim Bruns	3:42
7.	"Dear Drunk Me"	Erik Dylan; Sampson; Salter	2:53
Total length:			22:50

== Track listing (Deluxe Edition) ==
Back in the Game (Deluxe Edition)
No.	Title	Writer(s)	Length
1.	"Money On You"	Brownlee; Slate; Clark; Wood	3:17
2.	"Back in the Game"	Slate; Smith; Clark; Wood	3:02
3.	"Lovin’ A Wild Thing"	Brownlee; Glover; Brian White; Jason Sever	3:28
4.	"Dear Drunk Me"	Dylan; Sampson; Salter	2:53
5.	"Rest Of Your Night"	Brownlee; Corey Crowder; Phil Barton	3:05
6.	"Bourbon"	Brownlee; Glover; Bruns	3:42
7.	"Something Real"	Brownlee; Kelly Archer; Nathan Spicer	2:45
8.	"The Way You Roll"	Brownlee; Sampson; Salter	2:54
9.	"My Revival"	Brownlee; Glover; Thomson; McLean	3:24
10.	"This Old Guitar"	Brownlee	3:43
11.	"Forever's Gotta Start Somewhere"	Barlowe; Woods; Clark	3:09
Total length:			35:20

== Charts ==
Chart performance for singles from Back in the Game
Year	Single	Peak chart positions		Certifications
Year	Single	CAN Country	CAN	Certifications
2018	"Dear Drunk Me"	3	90	MC: Gold
2019	"Forever's Gotta Start Somewhere"	1	89	MC: Platinum
2019	"The Way You Roll"	3	—	
2020	"Money On You"	7	96	

== Release history ==
Release formats for Back in the Game
Country	Date	Format	Label	Ref.
Various	June 21, 2019	Digital download	Universal Music Canada	
Various	June 21, 2019	Streaming	Universal Music Canada	
Various	July 26, 2019	Compact disc	Universal Music Canada	

Release formats for Back in the Game (Deluxe Edition)
Country	Date	Format	Label	Ref.
Various	January 10, 2020	Digital download	Universal Music Canada	
Various	January 10, 2020	Streaming	Universal Music Canada	
Various	May 15, 2020	Vinyl	Universal Music Canada	
