= Ben Glover =

- Born: Benjamin Allen Glover; June 1, 1978 (age 47); Loveland, Colorado
- Origin: Nashville, Tennessee
- Genres: CCM, Christian rock, blue-eyed soul, folk rock, soft rock, roots rock, blues, soul
- Occupation(s): Singer, songwriter, music producer
- Instrument: vocals
- Years active: 1999–present

Benjamin Allen Glover (born June 1, 1978) is a songwriter and producer hailing from Loveland, Colorado, a small city on the edge of the Rocky Mountains. Glover moved to Nashville, Tennessee in 2000 after signing his first publishing deal the year prior.

== Music career ==
Originally getting his start as an artist, Glover spent the early part of his career touring, but quickly discovered he preferred the lights of a studio to the ones on a stage so he chose to get off the road and focus his attention on the craft of writing and producing songs. The results of that decision proved successful as he has penned over thirty-five #1 hits in multiple genres of music and was named ASCAP's Christian Songwriter of the Year in 2010, 2012, 2013, 2015, and 2016.

Glover wrote the hit county songs, "Hard to Love" by Lee Brice and "Love Don't Run" by Steve Holy along with numerous hits in Christian music including, "All This Time" and "The Lost Get Found" by Britt Nicole, "Write Your Story" by Francesca Battistelli and Mandisa's songs "Stronger" and "Overcomer," The latter of which won a Grammy Award.

Along with his credits as a songwriter, Glover has achieved notable success as a producer, writing and producing for MercyMe, For King & Country, Danny Gokey, Mandisa, among others.

== Associated acts ==
Glover has had over 400 songs recorded in multiple genres of music by artists such as Chris Tomlin, MercyMe, David Crowder, Trace Adkins, Gloriana, Thompson Square, The Backstreet Boys, Amy Grant & James Taylor, Chad Brownlee, Marc Broussard, Clay Walker, Joy Williams, Brandon Heath, Josh Wilson, The Afters, Colton Dixon, Newsboys, Kari Jobe and many others.

== Dove Awards ==
Year	Song	Award	Writers	Artist	Result
2016	"Flawless"	Song of the Year	Barry Graul, Bart Millard, Ben Glover, David Garcia, Mike Scheuchzer, Nathan Cochran, Robby Shaffer, Solomon Olds	MercyMe	Nominated
2015	"Come As You Are"	Song of the Year	Ben Glover, Matt Maher, David Crowder	David Crowder	Nominated
2015	"Shoulders"	Pop/Contemporary Song of the Year	Joel Smallbone, Luke Smallbone, Ben Glover, Tedd Tjornhom	For King & Country	Nominated
2015	RUN WILD. LIVE FREE. LOVE STRONG.	Pop/Contemporary Album of the Year	Seth Mosley, Tedd Tjornhom, Matt Hales, Ben Glover	For King & Country	WON
2014	"Overcomer"	Song of the Year	David Garcia, Christopher Stevens, Ben Glover	Mandisa	Nominated
2013	"All I Can Do (Thank You)"	Song of the Year	Mike Grayson, Ben Glover, David Garcia	Mikeschair	Nominated
2013	"Live Like That"	Song of the Year	Dave Fray, Ben McDonald, Ben Glover	Sidewalk Prophets	Nominated
2013	"The Proof of Your Love"	Song of the Year	Joel Smallbone, Fred Williams, Luke Smallbone, Ben Glover, Mia Fieldes, Johnathan Lee	For King & Country	Nominated
2013	"All I Can Do (Thank You)"	Pop/contemporary Song of the Year	Mike Grayson, Ben Glover, David Garcia,	Mikeschair	Nominated
2013	"Crave"	Pop Contemporary Album of the Year	Shaun Shankel, Matt Hales, Ben Glover (producers)	For King & Country	Nominated
2012	"Someone Worth Dying For"	Pop/Contemporary Song of the Year	Ben Glover, Mike Grayson, Samuel Anton Tinnesz	Mikeschair	Nominated
2010	"Let The Waters Rise"	Song of the Year	Sam Tinnesz, Mike Grayson, Ben Glover	Mikeschair	Nominated
2010	"Let The Waters Rise"	Pop/Contemporary Song of the Year	Samm Tinnesz, Mike Grayson, Ben Glover	Mikeschair	Nominated

== Grammy Awards ==
Year	Song	Award	Writers	Artist	Result
2015	"Write Your Story"	Best Contemporary Christian Music Song	Francesca Battistelli, David Garcia, Ben Glover	Francesca Battistelli	Nominated
2015	"Come As You Are"	Best Contemporary Christian Music Song	David Crowder, Ben Glover, Matt Maher	David Crowder	Nominated
2015	"Shake"	Best Contemporary Christian Music Song	Nathan Cochran, David Garcia, Ben Glover, Barry Graul, Bart Millard, Solomon Olds, Mike Scheuchzer, Robby Shaffer	MercyMe	Nominated
2013	"Overcomer"	Best Contemporary Christian Music Song	David Garcia, Ben Glover & Christopher Stevens	Mandisa	Won
2013	"Overcomer"	Best Contemporary Christian Music Album	Ben Glover (Producer)	Mandisa	Won

== Radio singles ==
Song title	Artist
All I Can Do	Mikeschair
All This Time	Britt Nicole
Back To You	Mandisa
Before The Morning	Josh Wilson
Carry Me	Josh Wilson
Center Of It	Chris August
Closer	Shawn McDonald
Come As You Are	Crowder
Come Home	Luminate
Day After you	Chad Brownlee
Dear X You Don't Own Me	Disciple
Didn't I	James Wesley
Don't Try So Hard	Amy Grant
Every Good Thing	MercyMe
Glow In The Dark	Jason Gray
Greater	MercyMe
Hard To Love	Lee Brice
He Said	Group 1 Crew
His Kind Of Love	Group 1 Crew
I Refuse	Josh Wilson
It's Not Over Yet	For King & Country
Jesus Loves Me	Chris Tomlin
Listen	Chad Brownlee
Live Like That	Sidewalk Prophets
Love Don't Run	Steve Holy
Love Me Or Leave Me	Chad Brownlee
Middle Of Your Heart	For King & Country
More Of You	Colton Dixon
Overcomer	Mandisa
Proof Of Your Love	For King & Country
Save My Life	Sidewalk Prophets
Shoulders (On Your Shoulders)	For King & Country
Someone Worth Dying For	Mikeschair
Steady My Heart	Kari Jobe
Stronger	Mandisa
That Was Then, This Is Now	Josh Wilson
The Lost Get Found	Britt Nicole
Through All Of It	Colton Dixon
Waiting For Tomorrow	Mandisa
Write Your Story	Francesca Battistelli
You Loved Me First	Mikeschair
