= Love Me or Leave Me =

Love Me or Leave Me may refer to:

- "Love Me or Leave Me" (Donaldson and Kahn song), a popular 1920s song from the Broadway play Whoopee! and popularized by Ruth Etting
- "Love Me or Leave Me", a song by Kerli on the 2013 EP Utopia
- "Love Me or Leave Me", a song by Day6 from the 2020 EP The Book of Us: The Demon
- "Love Me or Leave Me", a song by Raven-Symoné from the 2008 album Raven-Symoné
- "Love Me or Leave Me", a song by Little Mix from the 2015 album Get Weird
- "Love Me or Leave Me", a song by Three Days Grace from the 2018 album Outsider
- Love Me or Leave Me (film), a 1955 biographical movie starring Doris Day as Ruth Etting
- Love Me or Leave Me (Doris Day album), based on the soundtrack of the 1955 film
- Love Me or Leave Me (Chad Brownlee album), 2012
- Love Me or Leave Me, a 1988 album from the group The Gyrlz that later became Terri & Monica
- Love Me or Leave Me (2010 film), a TV musical film starring Carl Anthony Payne II
- Love Me or Leave Me (TV series), a Taiwanese television drama
