= Heart on Fire =

Heart on Fire may refer to:

- "Heart on Fire" (Eric Church song), 2021
- "Heart on Fire" (Indiana song), 2014
- "Heart on Fire" (Ruslana song), 2008
- "Heart on Fire", a song by Clean Bandit from New Eyes, 2014
- "Heart on Fire", a song by Da Pump, 2020
- "Heart on Fire", a song by Little Simz from No Thank You, 2022
- Sacred Heart, a symbol often depicted in Christian art as a flaming heart

== See also ==
- Hearts on Fire (disambiguation)
