= Donovan Woods (musician) =

Canadian singer-songwriter

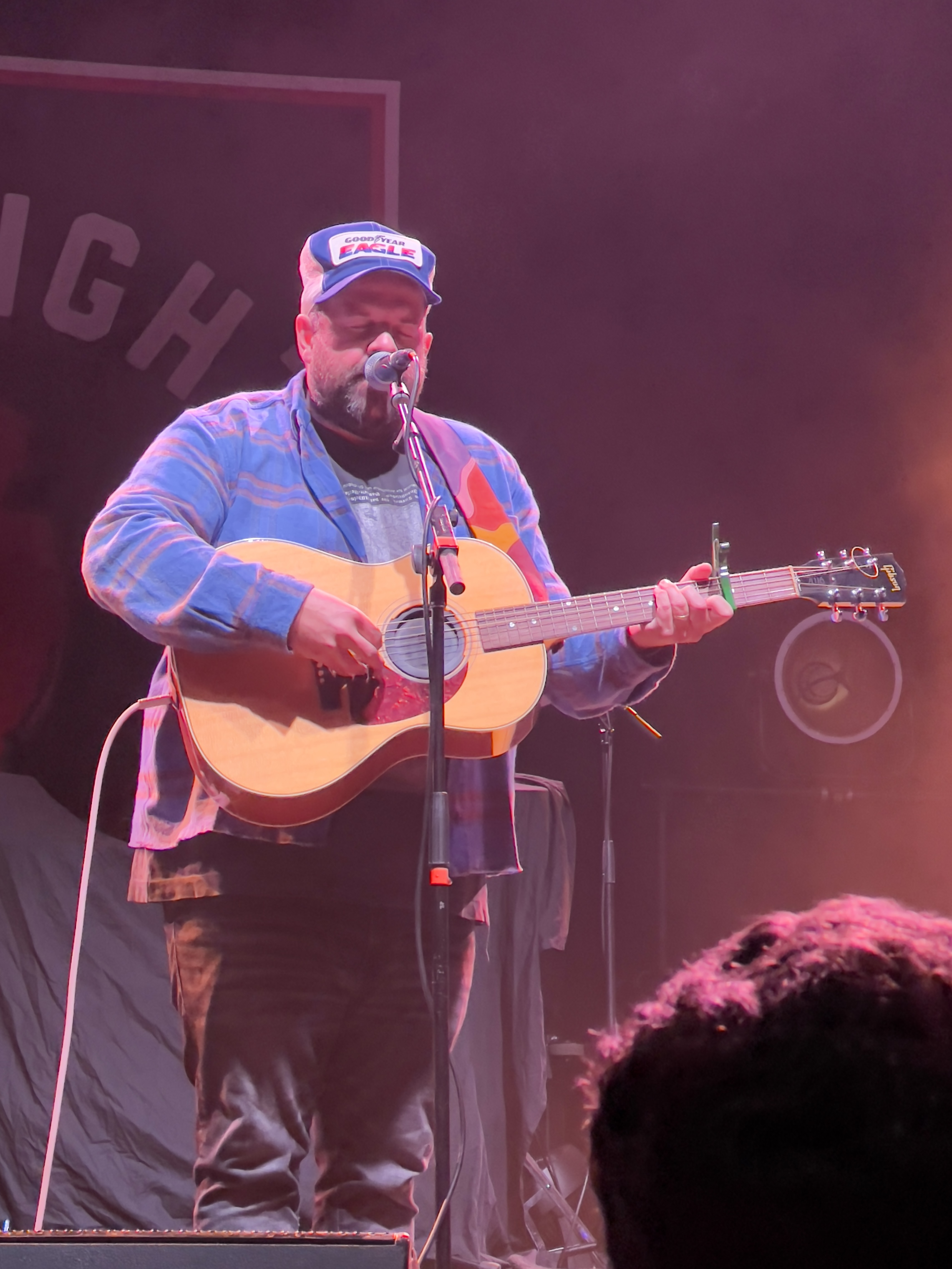
- Woods performing in 2023

Background information
- Born: Sarnia, Ontario, Canada
- Origin: Toronto, Ontario, Canada
- Genres: Folk, folk rock, country, country pop
- Occupation: Singer-songwriter
- Instruments: Vocals, guitar
- Years active: 2007–present
- Label: Meant Well Inc.
- Website: donovanwoods.net

Donovan Woods is a Canadian folk and country singer-songwriter. He has released several albums of folk and roots music, including the Juno Award-winning Both Ways.

== Early life ==
Woods was born and raised in Sarnia, Ontario. He began playing guitar and writing songs as a teenager.

== Career ==
Woods' first album, The Hold Up, was released in 2007.

His second album, The Widowmaker, was released in 2010, and his third album, Don't Get Too Grand, was released in 2013 and garnered Woods' first Juno Award nomination for Roots & Traditional Album of the Year: Solo.

His fourth album, Hard Settle, Ain't Troubled, was released February 26, 2016, and was a longlisted nominee for the 2016 Polaris Music Prize. At the 12th Canadian Folk Music Awards, Woods won the award for English Songwriter of the Year, and the album was nominated for Contemporary Album of the Year.

Woods' fifth full-length album Both Ways was released on April 20, 2018. At the Juno Awards of 2019, Both Ways won the Juno Award for Contemporary Roots Album of the Year. In May 2019 Woods released The Other Way, a companion album to Both Ways which featured more acoustic-based renditions of the prior album's songs. The Other Way included guest vocals from Tenille Townes on "I Ain't Ever Loved No One", which was a duet with Rose Cousins in its original Both Ways version.

The next full-length album, Without People, was released on November 6, 2020. The album featured guest vocals from both Katie Pruitt and Rhys Lewis as well as songwriting credits from Ashley Monroe, Tucker Beathard, Thomas Finchum and Ed Robertson of Barenaked Ladies. As part of the release, Woods launched the Donovan Woods With People Project, which featured dancers and visual artists from multiple countries creating pieces inspired by songs from the album. One of the project's featured artists was Brooklyn-based singer-songwriter, Ariana and the Rose.

On May 7, 2021, Woods released the song "IOWA" with Aoife O'Donovan. On March 18, 2022, Woods released his EP, Big Hurt Boy. He subsequently opened for Matt Nathanson on his "Some Mad Hope 15th Anniversary Tour" in the United States.

In 2023, he participated in an all-star recording of Serena Ryder's single "What I Wouldn't Do", which was released as a charity single to benefit Kids Help Phone's Feel Out Loud campaign for youth mental health.

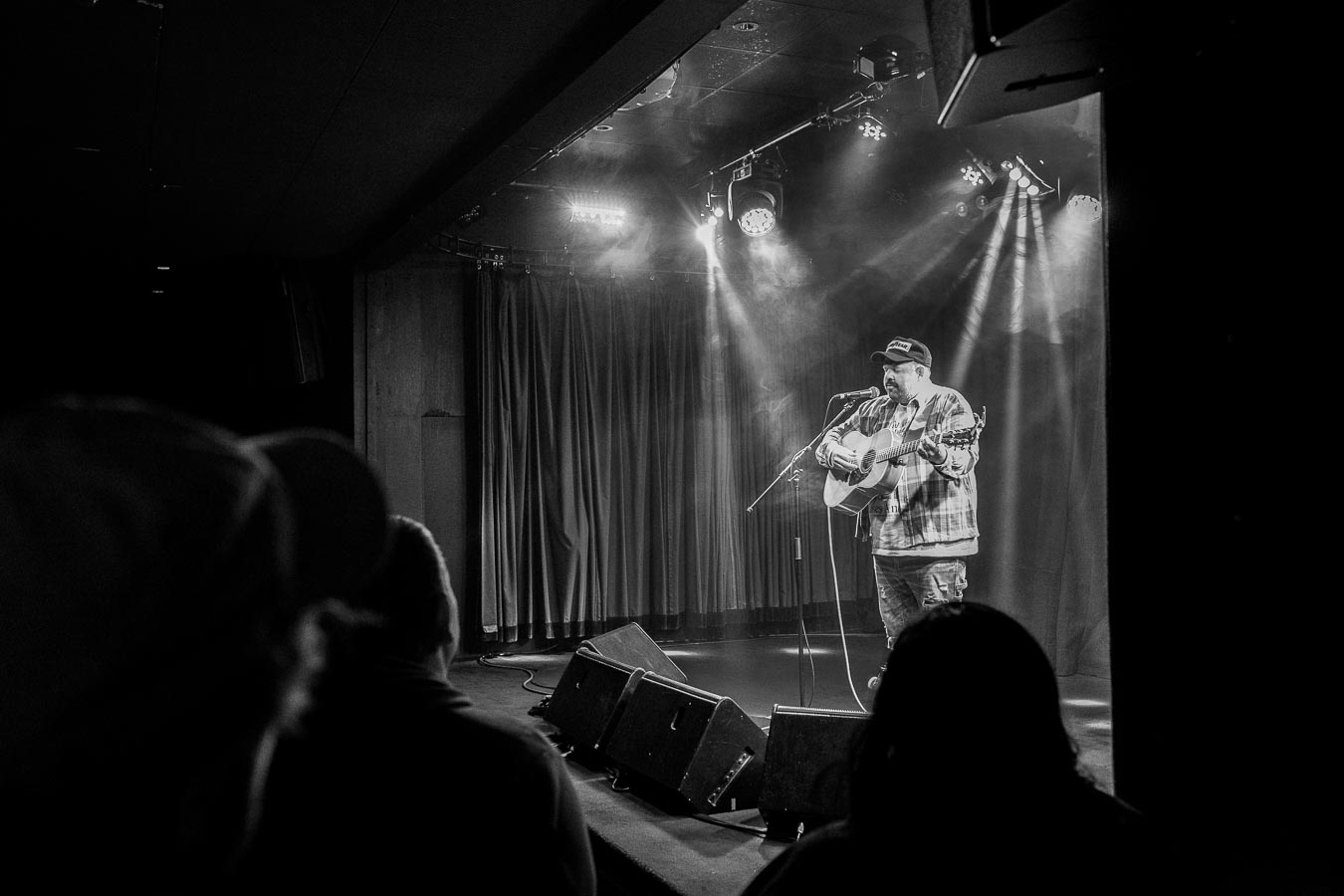
Donovan Woods performing at Northcote Social Club, Melbourne, during his first Australian tour, June 2024.

In June 2024, Woods undertook his first tour of Australia, performing seven shows in Perth, Adelaide, Melbourne, Belgrave, Newcastle, Sydney and Brisbane. The tour included a performance at Northcote Social Club in Melbourne on 15 June.

On July 12, 2024, his most recent album, "Things Were Never Good If They're Not Good Now" was released by End Times Music, an indie label founded by Woods and Michelle Szeto. The record features 11 songs and two bonus tracks. It was longlisted for the 2025 Polaris Music Prize.

In January 2026, Woods announced an EP, Squander Your Gifts, set to be released on February 27, 2026.

=== Songwriting ===
Woods' song "Portland, Maine" (co-written with Abe Stoklasa) has also been recorded by Tim McGraw. Woods' song "Leaving Nashville" (also co-written with Abe Stoklasa) has been recorded by Lady A singer Charles Kelley.

Woods was signed to Warner/Chappell Nashville in 2016.

In 2018, Woods was a SOCAN Songwriting Prize nominee as cowriter of James Barker Band's song "Chills". He has also co-written the number one Canada Country hits "Feels Like That" by the Reklaws and "Forever's Gotta Start Somewhere" by Chad Brownlee.

=== Film/TV Syncs ===
Woods' song "Brand New Gun" was featured in the movie Numb starring Matthew Perry. His song "Wait and See" was featured on Degrassi: The Next Generation, and his song "My Cousin Has a Grey Cup Ring" was used in commercials for the Grey Cup. "Grey Cup Ring" was inspired by Woods' father, who is a cousin of former Montreal Alouettes player Glen Weir. His song "Kennedy" was featured on an episode of The Good Doctor in 2017, "Don't Get Too Grand" was featured on Rookie Blue and "Portland, Maine" was featured on season 1 of Legacies in 2019. Woods' has had other placements in shows like Felicity, Less Than Kind and The Fosters.

Woods wrote "The Heart of Christmas" performed by Alicia Witt in the Hallmark movie, Our Christmas Love Song.

== Discography ==
Studio Albums
Title	Details
The Hold Up	Released: May 23, 2007; Label: SunnyLane Records
The Widowmaker	Released: September 30, 2010; Label: Meant Well
Don't Get Too Grand	Released: March 5, 2013; Label: Meant Well
Hard Settle, Ain't Troubled	Released: February 26, 2016; Label: Meant Well
Both Ways	Released: April 20, 2018; Label: Meant Well
The Other Way	Released: May 3, 2019; Label: Meant Well
Without People	Released: November 6, 2020; Label: Meant Well
Without People (Deluxe)	Released: March 26, 2021; Label: Meant Well
Things Were Never Good If They're Not Good Now	Released: July 12, 2024; Label: End Times Music

Singles & Extended Plays
Title	Details
"That Hotel"	Released: 2015; Formats: Single
"Portland, Maine"	Released: 2015; Formats: Single
They Are Going Away	Released: 2016; Formats: EP
"All Mine"	Released: 2017; Formats: Single
"The Worst Way"	Released: 2017; Formats: Single
The Wild Honey Pie Buzzsession	Released: 2018; Formats: Live Sessions
"Way Way Back"	Released: 2019; Formats: Single
"While All the While"	Released: 2019; Formats: Single
"IOWA" (with Aoife O'Donovan)	Released: May 7, 2021; Formats: Single
Big Hurt Boy	Released: March 18, 2022; Formats: EP
"I'm Around"	Released: October 20, 2023; Formats: Single
"Back for the Funeral"	Released: May 3, 2024; Formats: Single
Squander Your Gifts	Released: February 27, 2026; Formats: EP

== Awards and nominations ==
Award	Year	Category	Nominated work	Result	Ref
Canadian Country Music Awards	2021	Alternative Country Album of the Year	Without People	Nominated	
Juno Awards	2014	Roots & Traditional Album of the Year – Solo	Don't Get Too Grand	Nominated	
Juno Awards	2017	Songwriter of the Year	"Leaving Nashville", "What Kind of Love Is That", "They Don't Make Anything in That Town"	Nominated	
Juno Awards	2019	Songwriter of the Year	"Our Friend Bobby", "Truck Full of Money", "Next Year"	Nominated	
Juno Awards	2019	Contemporary Roots Album of the Year	Both Ways	Won	
Juno Awards	2022	Contemporary Roots Album of the Year	Without People	Nominated	
Juno Awards	2025	Contemporary Roots Album of the Year	Things Were Never Good if They're Not Good Now	Nominated	

== Great Lakes ranking ==
Every year Donovan Woods ranks the Great Lakes for charity.

Year	1	2	3	4	5	Ref
2025	Huron	Superior	Ontario	Michigan	Erie	
2024	Huron	Superior	Michigan	Ontario	Erie	
2023	Huron	Superior	Ontario	Michigan	Erie	
2022	Huron	Superior	Michigan	Ontario	Erie	
2021	Huron	Superior	Michigan	Ontario	Erie	
2020	Huron	Superior	Michigan	Ontario	Erie	
