= Hearts Aflame =

Hearts Aflame may refer to:

- Hearts Aflame (film), a 1923 silent film directed by Reginald Barker
- Hearts Aflame (novel), a 1987 romance novel by Johanna Lindsey

== See also ==
- Hearts Afire, a 1990s television sitcom
- Hearts on Fire (disambiguation)
