= I Hate You for It =

Single by Chad Brownlee

from the album Hearts on Fire
- Released: April 26, 2016
- Genre: Country rock
- Length: 3:32
- Label: MDM Recordings
- Songwriters: Chad Brownlee; Ben Glover; Mitch Merrett
- Producers: Ben Glover; Mitch Merrett

Chad Brownlee singles chronology
"Hearts on Fire" (2015)	"I Hate You for It" (2016)	"Somethin' We Shouldn't Do" (2016)

"I Hate You for It" is a song recorded by Canadian country artist Chad Brownlee for his first extended play, Hearts on Fire (2016). Brownlee co-wrote the song with the track's producers, Ben Glover and Mitch Merrett. It was released to Canadian country radio April 26, 2016 as the second single three days before the EP's release. "I Hate You for It" was certified Gold by Music Canada in January 2017 for digital sales of over 40,000 copies, becoming his first certified single.

== Content ==
"I Hate You for It" combines country vocals with influences of rock music. The song is about "[being] so in love with somebody that you facetiously hate the fact that they have control over your life." In an interview with Regina Leader-Post, Brownlee said that he and the song's co-writers "knew that it pushed the envelope, especially with the word 'hate' in the title," but that they were confident in the stylistic direction of the song and that he was attracted to recording it because of that edginess.

== Commercial performance ==
"I Hate You for It" debuted at number 36 on the Billboard Canada Country chart dated May 21, 2016 and reached a peak position of 8 on the chart dated August 6, 2016. This tied it with previous single "Hearts on Fire" as Brownlee's highest-charting singles to date, until "Somethin' We Shouldn't Do" peaked one position higher in 2017. "I Hate You for It" was the top-selling country single in Canada for 10 weeks. In January 2017, the single was certified Gold by Music Canada for verified sales of over 40,000 digital copies.

== Music video ==
The music video for "I Hate You for It" was directed by Stephano Barberis. A censored version premiered exclusively through CMT Canada before the full, uncensored version was released on July 11, 2016. Taking place in a strip club, the video features provocative shots of female dancers and "dark, moody visuals." The staff of Sounds Like Nashville deemed the video "steamy" and a good match for the song's lyrics, while other outlets voiced concern over the video's suitability for younger audiences.

== Charts ==
Chart (2016)	Peak position
Canada Country (Billboard)	8

== Certifications and sales ==
Region	Certification	Certified units/sales
Canada (Music Canada)	Gold	40,000^{‡}
^{‡} Sales+streaming figures based on certification alone.
