= Forever's Gotta Start Somewhere =

2019 song by Chad Brownlee

Single by Chad Brownlee

from the album Back in the Game
- Released: January 4, 2019
- Genre: Country
- Length: 3:09
- Label: Universal Music Canada
- Songwriters: Cary Barlowe; Donovan Woods; Todd Clark
- Producer: Todd Clark

Chad Brownlee singles chronology
"Dear Drunk Me" (2018)	"Forever's Gotta Start Somewhere" (2019)	"The Way You Roll" (2019)

Music video
- "Forever's Gotta Start Somewhere" on YouTube

"Forever's Gotta Start Somewhere" is a song recorded by Canadian country music artist Chad Brownlee. It was the second single off his fourth studio album Back in the Game. The song was co-written by Cary Barlowe, Donovan Woods, and Todd Clark. It became Brownlee’s first #1 hit on the Billboard Canada Country chart.

== Background ==
Brownlee stated "Forever’s Gotta Start Somewhere is about that bold first move in introducing yourself to someone new. For many this is a nerve racking experience, but in order for any relationship to happen there must first be a beginning. This is that initial step into what could potentially be a lifelong love. For me, these past few months have been a time of heavy goodbye’s, but I know all endings are necessary in order to usher in new beginnings. This song is about taking a chance and not looking back. Right now, that is the very credence of this next chapter in my life."

== Commercial performance ==
"Forever's Gotta Start Somewhere" was certified Gold by Music Canada on July 14, 2020, with over 40,000 sales, and then later reached Platinum certification on March 31, 2022, signifying 80,000 sale equivalent units. As of April 2021, the song had received over 16.2 million streams through Spotify.

== Music video ==
The official music video for "Forever's Gotta Start Somewhere" was directed by Ben Knechtel and premiered March 1, 2019.

== Chart performance ==
"Forever's Gotta Start Somewhere" reached a peak of number 1 on the Billboard Canada Country chart dated April 27, 2019, marking Brownlee's first chart-topper. It also peaked at number 89 on the Billboard Canadian Hot 100, his fifth-highest charting entry on that chart.

Chart (2019)	Peak position
Canada (Canadian Hot 100)	89
Canada Country (Billboard)	1

== Certifications ==
Region	Certification	Certified units/sales
Canada (Music Canada)	Platinum	80,000^{‡}
^{‡} Sales+streaming figures based on certification alone.
