= Fallin' Over You =

2014 song by Chad Brownlee

Single by Chad Brownlee

from the album The Fighters
- Released: March 4, 2014
- Genre: Country
- Length: 3:16
- Label: MDM; ZZZ
- Songwriter(s): Dennis Matkosky; Terry Sawchuk; Matt Alderman
- Producer(s): Mitch Merrett

Chad Brownlee singles chronology
"Where the Party At?" (2013)	"Fallin' Over You" (2014)	"Just Because" (2014)

Music video
- "Fallin' Over You" on YouTube

"Fallin' Over You" is a song recorded by Canadian country artist Chad Brownlee. The song was co-written by Dennis Matkosky, Terry Sawchuk, and Matt Alderman. It was the second single from Brownlee's third studio album The Fighters.

== Music video ==
The music video was directed by Carolyne Stossel and premiered on April 3, 2014. The video features Brownlee singing and playing the guitar in the air on a passenger plane, in a deserted area, and with his band on the back of a destroyed aircraft.

== Charts ==
"Fallin' Over You" reached a peak of #10 on Billboard Canada Country chart, becoming his sixth Top 10 hit. It peaked at #66 on the Canadian Hot 100, marking his highest charting entry there.

Chart (2014)	Peak position
Canada (Canadian Hot 100)	66
Canada Country (Billboard)	10
