= Brennley Brown =

American singer

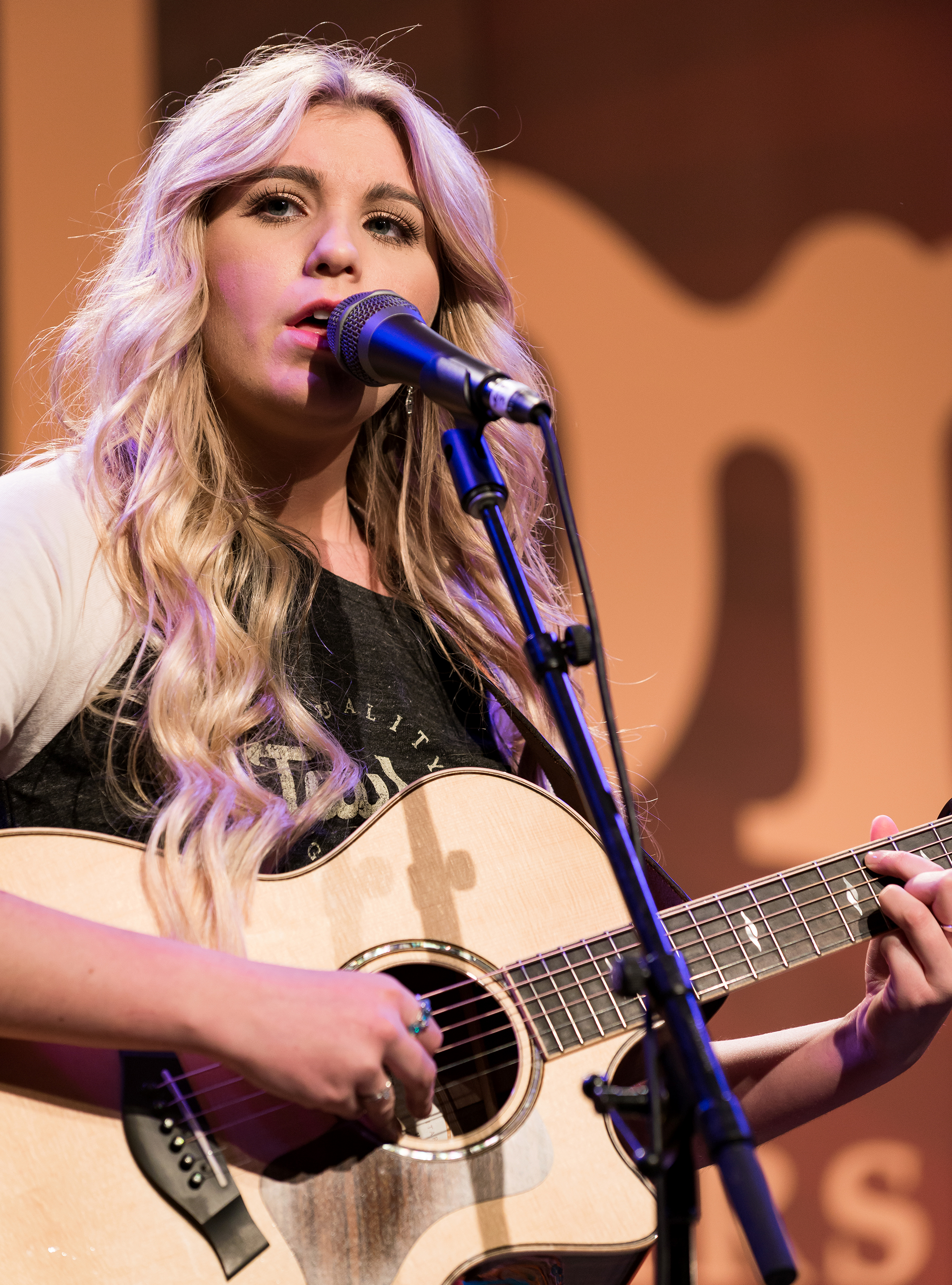
- Brown in 2018
- Born: January 24, 2002 (age 24); Huntington Beach, California
- Musical career
- Genres: Country; worship
- Years active: 2017–present
- Label: Independent

Brennley Brown (born January 24, 2002) is an American singer from Huntington Beach, California. She is best known for being a semi-finalist on the twelfth season of NBC's reality talent show The Voice.

After her time on The Voice, Brown began an independent music career. She released a single called "Keep Coming Back" on October 31, 2019. Her second single, "One More Hallelujah", was released in February 2020. A music video for "One More Hallelujah" was released on March 19, 2020. On August 6, 2020, at the age of 18, she released a live album titled The Balcony Sessions: Live from Alabama Street.

== Career ==
=== 2017: The Voice ===
Brown competed on season 12 of The Voice in 2017. She was then aged fifteen and sang country songs. Initially being coached on the team coached by Blake Shelton, she became a part of the team coached by Gwen Stefani, following her loss in the battles to Lauren Duski.

People magazine described her as "a standout performer". She would go on to advance to the week five semifinals, where she would be eliminated in the instant save portion.

=== 2017–present: Independent releases ===
After her appearance on The Voice, Brown's independent music career began.

On October 31, 2019, Brown published "Keep Coming Back", a love ballad. The song was a single released before her first EP, which was produced by Blake Shelton.

On August 6, 2020, at the age of 18, she released a live album titled The Balcony Sessions: Live from Alabama Street. The album was inspired by her performances on her home's balcony that she did when the COVID-19 pandemic in the United States started in March 2020. Those performances were attended by socially distanced crowds and lasted until May 2020. Grammy Award-winning music producer Luke Wooten produced the eight-track album. She had released her single "One More Hallelujah" in February 2020, before COVID plagued the United States. A music video for "One More Hallelujah" was released on March 19, 2020. Brown released an EP called Story Says on October 23, 2020.

=== Voice Acting ===
From 2019 through 2022, Brown voiced the main character of Leyla, a human girl who can speak to dragons, for six seasons on DreamWorks Dragons: Rescue Riders, a spinoff of the How to Train Your Dragon film franchise. Nicolas Cantu voiced her character's twin brother, Dak.

== Personal life ==
Brown is a member of the Harvest Christian Fellowship and was involved in leading their worship music online during COVID-19.

She is close friends with the American actor, voice actor, and YouTuber, Nicolas Cantu.
