= Dear Drunk Me =

2018 song by Chad Brownlee

Single by Chad Brownlee

from the album Back in the Game
- Released: August 13, 2018
- Genre: Country pop
- Length: 3:02
- Label: Universal Canada
- Songwriter(s): Erik Dylan; Gordie Sampson; Thomas Salter
- Producer(s): Todd Clark

Chad Brownlee singles chronology
| "Out of the Blue" (2017) | "Dear Drunk Me" (2018) | "Forever's Gotta Start Somewhere" (2019) |

Music video
- "Dear Drunk Me" on YouTube

"Dear Drunk Me" is a song recorded by the Canadian country music artist Chad Brownlee. It was co-written by Erik Dylan, Gordie Sampson and Tawgs Salter. It was the lead single from Brownlee's studio album Back in the Game, and his first major-label release with Universal Music Canada.

== Commercial performance ==
"Dear Drunk Me" reached a peak of #3 on Billboard Canada Country chart and was Brownlee's first Top 5 hit. It peaked at #90 on the Canadian Hot 100, which made it his first charting entry there since "When the Lights Go Down" in 2014. The song has been certified Gold by Music Canada.

== Music video ==
The official music video for "Dear Drunk Me" was premiered on ET Canada on September 12, 2018, and shows Brownlee acting in a drunk night filled with poor decisions. It was directed by Ben Knechtel.

== Charts ==
| Chart (2018) | Peak position |
|---|---|
| Canada (Canadian Hot 100) | 90 |
| Canada Country (Billboard) | 3 |

== Certifications ==
| Region | Certification | Certified units/sales |
|---|---|---|
| Canada (Music Canada) | Platinum | 80,000^{‡} |
^{‡} Sales+streaming figures based on certification alone.
