= Chris Blue =

American singer (born 1990)

- Born: January 15, 1990 (age 36); Glendale, Arizona, U.S.
- Origin: Knoxville, Tennessee, U.S.
- Genres: R&B; soul; gospel; pop
- Occupation: Singer
- Instrument: Vocals
- Years active: 2014–present
- Label: Republic Records

Chris Blue (born January 15, 1990) is an American soul and gospel singer. He was the winner of season 12 of the American talent competition The Voice at the age of 27. He was the last artist to sing during the blind auditions in his season and filled the last spot on Team Alicia.

== Life and career ==
=== Early life and career beginnings ===
Blue was born on January 15, 1990, in Glendale, Arizona, United States, to Ernest Blue Jr. and Janice Blue-Williams. He is the youngest of seven children. The family moved to Knoxville, Tennessee, when he was 10 years old. Blue started singing in church at the age of three. Blue started preaching at Peace and Goodwill Missionary Baptist Church in Knoxville, Tennessee, and was ordained at the age of 15. He eventually became a worship leader in the Cokesbury United Methodist Church. Choosing a music career from very early on, he formed the Blue Brothers with his siblings and later they appeared on BET's Bobby Jones Gospel show. He won the Voice-Off Knoxville competition in 2015. He toured locally as well as in England, The Bahamas, Jamaica and the Virgin Islands. Blue also attended Tennessee Temple University in Chattanooga, TN, and was actively involved in the campus worship ministry as well as the campus gospel choir.

=== The Voice (2017) ===
Blue auditioned in 2017 to compete in season 12 of The Voice. In the blind auditions, broadcast on March 14, 2017, on NBC, he sang "The Tracks of My Tears" from The Miracles and was the last competitor to perform in the Blind Auditions on episode 7 of the auditions. Alicia Keys was the only judge left with a place in her team and she chose Blue. Blue became part of Team Alicia by default.

He won the title for the season against Blake Shelton's finalist Lauren Duski who finished as runner-up.

The Voice performances

– Studio version of performance reached the top 10 on iTunes

Stage	Song	Original artist	Date	Order	Result
Blind Audition	"The Tracks of My Tears"	Smokey Robinson and The Miracles	March 14, 2017	7.9	Alicia Keys, the only judge with places left on team Joined Team Alicia by default
Battles (Top 48)	"Adorn" (vs. RJ Collins)	Miguel	March 21, 2017	10.2	Saved by Alicia
Knockouts (Top 32)	"Superstition" (vs. Quizz Swanigan)	Stevie Wonder	April 3, 2017	13.1	Saved by Alicia
Live Playoffs (Top 24)	"Love on the Brain"	Rihanna	April 17, 2017	17.7	Saved by Public Vote
Live Top 12	"Love and Happiness"	Al Green	April 24, 2017	19.6	Saved by Public Vote
Live Top 11	"When a Man Loves a Woman"	Percy Sledge	May 1, 2017	21.11	Saved by Public Vote
Live Top 10	"24K Magic"	Bruno Mars	May 8, 2017	23.5	Saved by Public Vote
Live Semifinals (Top 8)	"If I Ain't Got You" (duet with Vanessa Ferguson)	Alicia Keys	May 15, 2017	25.2	Saved by Public Vote
Live Semifinals (Top 8)	"Take Me to the King"	Tamela Mann	May 15, 2017	25.5	Saved by Public Vote
Live Finale (Final 4)	"Diamonds and Pearls" (with Alicia Keys)	Prince and The New Power Generation	May 22, 2017	27.3	Winner
Live Finale (Final 4)	"Money on You" (original song)	Chris Blue	May 22, 2017	27.6	Winner
Live Finale (Final 4)	"Rhythm Nation"	Janet Jackson	May 22, 2017	27.12	Winner

Non competition performances
Order	Collaborator(s)	Song	Original Artist
22.1	Vanessa Ferguson, Stephanie Rice and Alicia Keys	"(You Make Me Feel Like) A Natural Woman"	Aretha Franklin
28.7	Usher	"Everybody Hurts"	R.E.M.

== Personal life ==
Blue met his English wife Stephanie Dunkley in 2014.

== Discography ==
=== Albums ===
- 2017: The Complete Season 12 Collection (The Voice)
- 2019: Fresh Start
- 2019: One Light
- 2024: Foundations: The Hymns of My Heart

=== Singles ===
- 2017: "Money on You"
- 2017: "Blue Blood Blues"
- 2017: "Humanity"
- 2019: "You Are My Heaven"

Releases from The Voice

- 2017: "The Tracks of My Tears"
- 2017: "Adorn" (with RJ Collins)
- 2017: "Superstition"
- 2017: "Love on the Brain"
- 2017: "Love and Happiness"
- 2017: "When a Man Loves a Woman"
- 2017: "24K Magic"
- 2017: "If I Ain't Got You" (with Vanessa Ferguson)
- 2017: "Take Me to the King"
- 2017: "Diamonds and Pearls" (with Alicia Keys)
- 2017: "Rhythm Nation"
- 2017: "Money on You"

Awards and achievements
Preceded by Sundance Head	The Voice (American); Winner; 2017 (Spring)	Succeeded by Chloe Kohanski
Preceded by "Darlin' Don't Go"	The Voice (American); Winner's song "Money on You"; 2017 (Spring)	Succeeded by "Wish I Didn't Love You"
