= Hearts on Fire (EP) =

EP by Chad Brownlee
- Released: April 29, 2016
- Genre: Country
- Length: 23:52
- Label: MDM Recordings
- Producer: Scott Cooke; Ben Glover; Mitch Merrett

Chad Brownlee chronology
The Fighters (2014)	Hearts on Fire (2016)	Back in the Game (2019)

Singles from Hearts on Fire
- 1. "Hearts on Fire" Released: November 27, 2015; 2. "I Hate You for It" Released: April 26, 2016; 3. "Somethin' We Shouldn't Do" Released: October 4, 2016; 4. "Might As Well Be Me" Released: March 14, 2017; 5. "Out of the Blue" Released: July 18, 2017

Hearts on Fire is an extended play by Canadian country music artist Chad Brownlee. It was released on April 29, 2016, via MDM Recordings. It includes the singles "Hearts on Fire" and "I Hate You for It".

== Track listing ==
No.	Title	Writer(s)	Length
1.	"Hearts on Fire"	Erik Dylan; Angelo Petraglia	3:19
2.	"I Hate You for It"	Chad Brownlee; Ben Glover; Mitch Merrett	3:32
3.	"Somethin' We Shouldn't Do"	Matt Jenkins; Shane McAnally; Jimmy Robbins	3:12
4.	"Might as Well Be Me"	Glover; Russell Dickerson; Brian White	4:31
5.	"Out of the Blue"	Brownlee; Andrew DeRoberts; Dylan	3:04
6.	"Gone Gone"	Jenkins; Robbins	3:04
7.	"Damn the Radio"	Kelly Archer; Brownlee; Merritt	3:10
Total length:			23:52

== Chart performance ==
=== Album ===
Chart (2016)	Peak position
Canadian Albums (Billboard)	48

=== Singles ===
Year	Single	Peak positions
Year	Single	CAN Country
2015	"Hearts on Fire"	8
2016	"I Hate You for It"	8
2016	"Somethin' We Shouldn't Do"	7
2017	"Might As Well Be Me"	14
2017	"Out of the Blue"	18
