= The Voice (American TV series) season 12 =

The Voice
- Season 12
- Promotional poster featuring coaches Shelton, Stefani, Keys, and Levine
- Hosted by: Carson Daly
- Coaches: Adam Levine; Gwen Stefani; Alicia Keys; Blake Shelton
- No. of contestants: 48 artists
- Winner: Chris Blue
- Winning coach: Alicia Keys
- Runner-up: Lauren Duski
- No. of episodes: 28

Release
- Original network: NBC
- Original release: February 27 – May 23, 2017

Season chronology
- ← Previous; Season 11 Next → Season 13

The twelfth season of the American reality talent show The Voice premiered on February 27, 2017 on NBC. Adam Levine, Alicia Keys and Blake Shelton continued as coaches with Gwen Stefani returning after a two-season absence. Carson Daly continued as the show's host.

This is the first season iTunes bonuses were awarded for duet performances (seen in semifinals and finals), in addition to previous bonuses which were awarded during the live shows (including the finals which was intact since season 10).

Chris Blue was named the winner of the season, marking Alicia Keys' first win as a coach and the second female coach to win in the show's history, following Christina Aguilera and Blue's win being the third African-American male winner. For the first time, the last artist (and also the first artist receiving only one chair turn by default) selected in the Blind Auditions went on to win the entire season.

== Coaches and hosts ==
Coaches and Host of The Voice Season 12

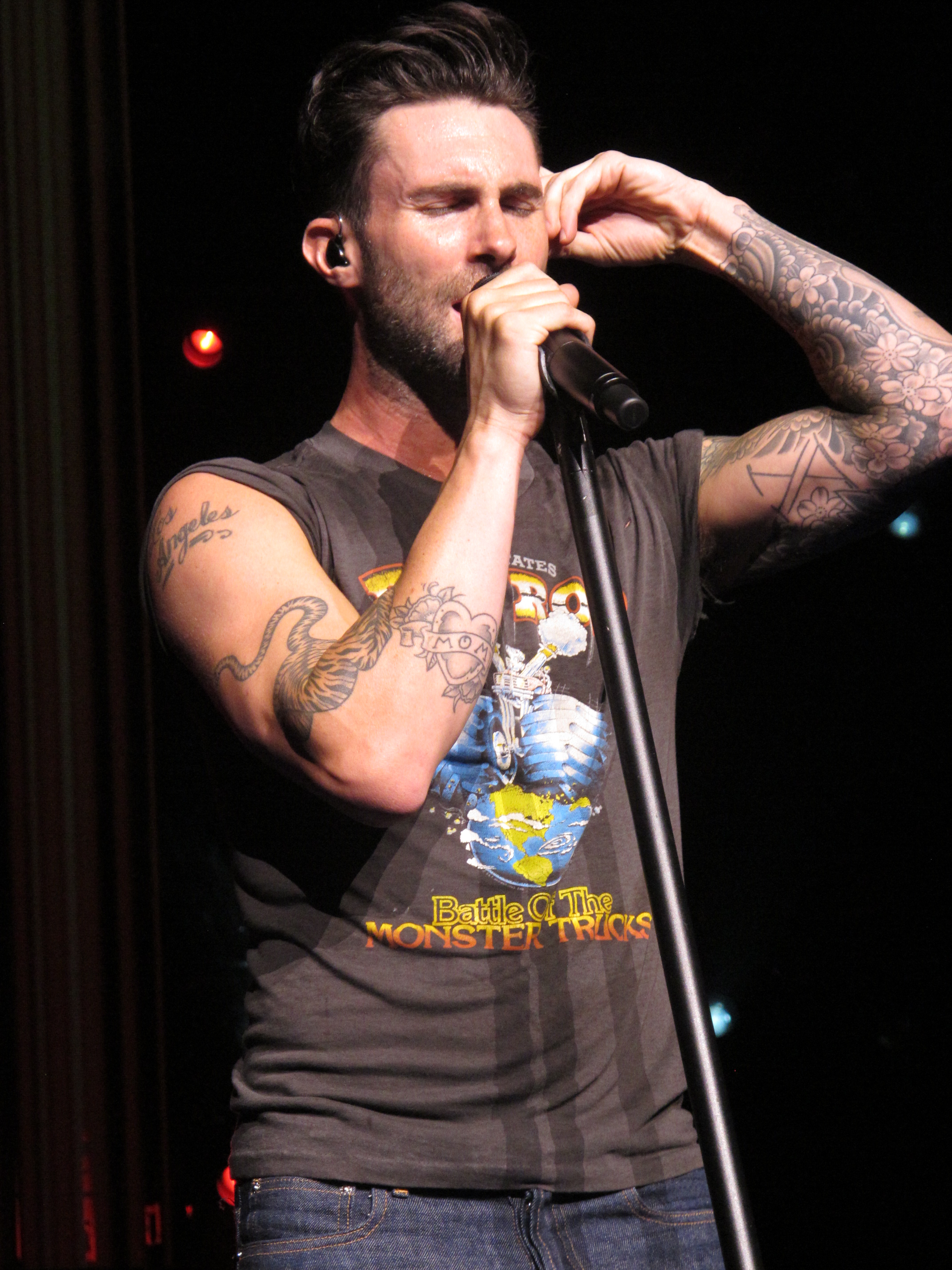
Adam Levine

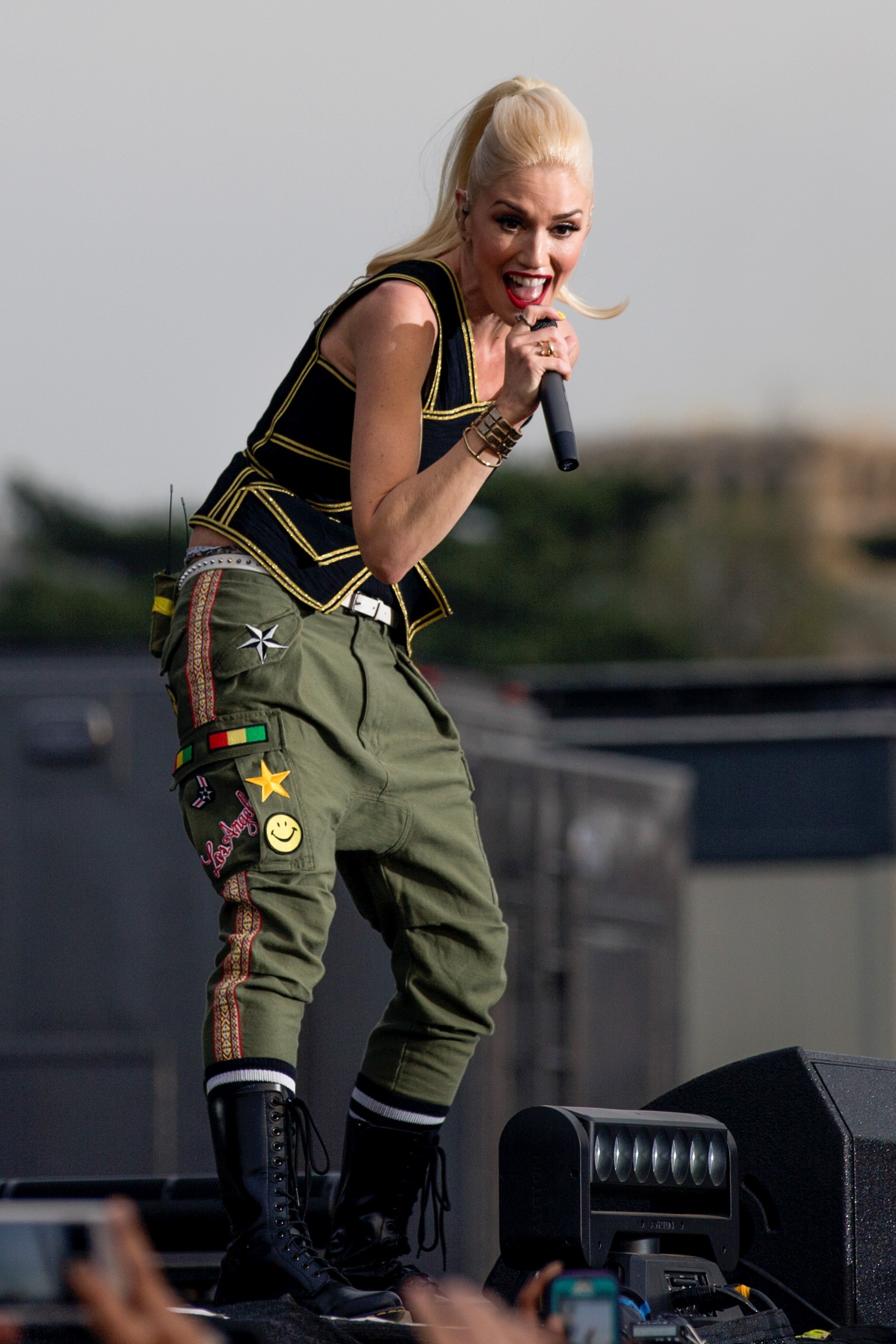
Gwen Stefani

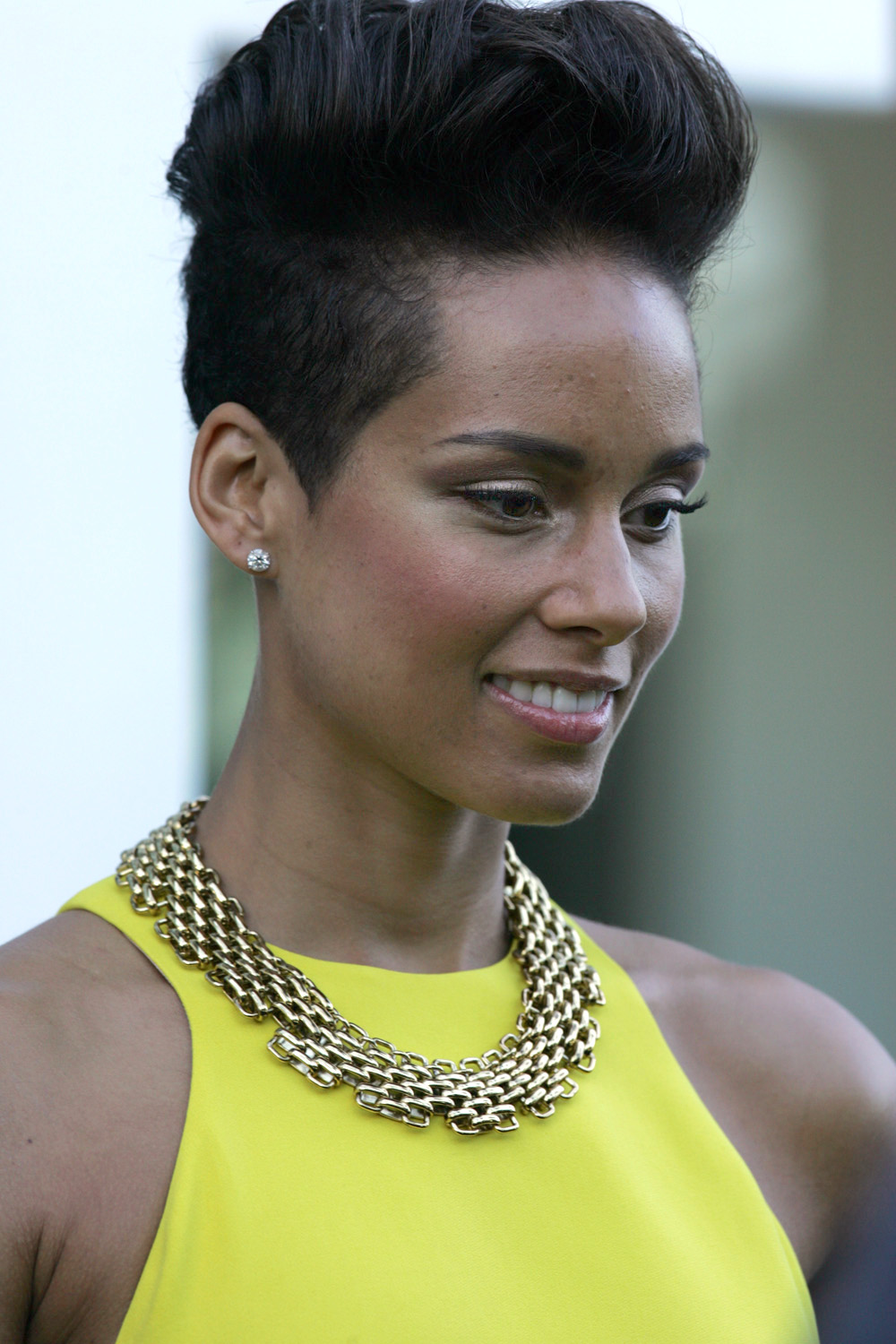
Alicia Keys

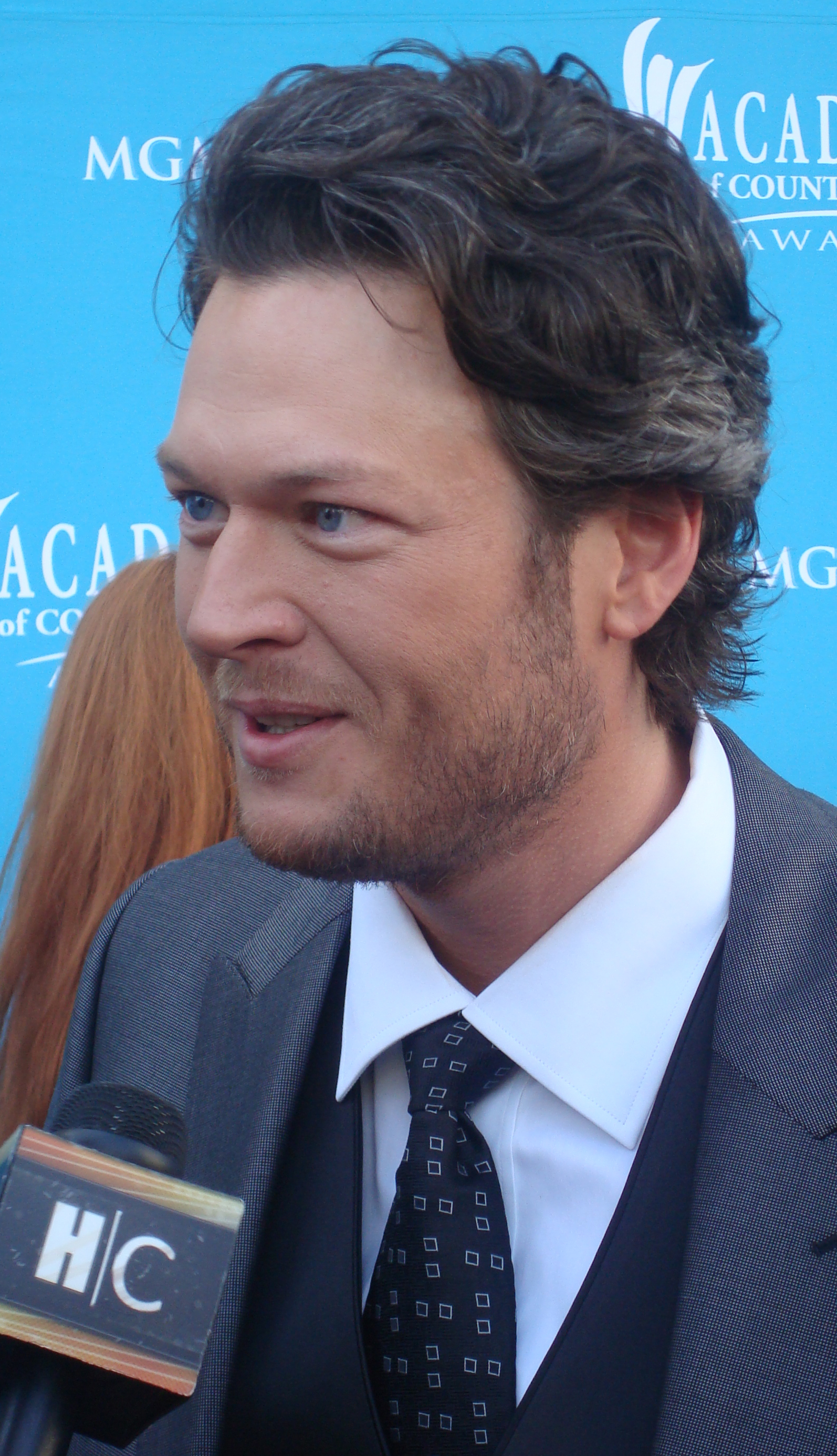
Blake Shelton

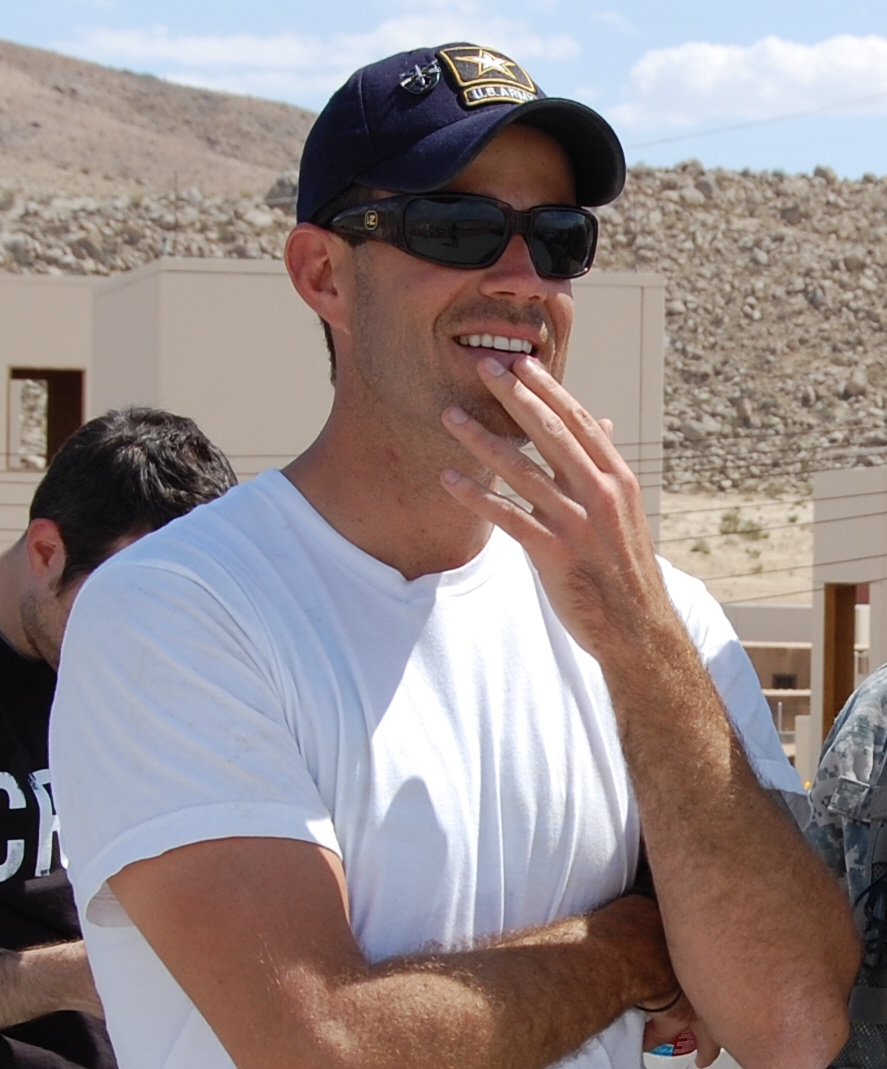
Carson Daly

There was a change in the coaching panel for the twelfth season. Gwen Stefani returned to the panel after a two-season hiatus, replacing Miley Cyrus along with returning coaches Adam Levine, Blake Shelton, and Alicia Keys while Carson Daly returned for his 12th season as host.

This season's Battle advisors were: John Legend for Team Adam; Celine Dion for Team Gwen; DJ Khaled for Team Alicia; Luke Bryan for Team Blake.

== Teams ==
Color key

- Winner
- Runner-up
- Third place
- Fourth place
- Eliminated in the Live Shows
- Eliminated in Live Playoffs
- Stolen in the Knockout rounds
- Eliminated in the Knockout rounds
- Stolen in the Battle rounds
- Eliminated in the Battle rounds

Coaches	Top 48 artists				
Adam Levine					
Adam Levine	Jesse Larson	Mark Isaiah	Lilli Passero	Hanna Eyre	**Johnny Hayes**
Adam Levine	Josh West	Malik Davage	Davina Leone	Autumn Turner	Taylor Alexander
Adam Levine	Gaby Borromeo	Sheena Brook	Kawan DeBose	Julien Martinez	Nala Price
Gwen Stefani					
Gwen Stefani	Brennley Brown	Hunter Plake	Troy Ramey	**Johnny Gates**	JChosen
Gwen Stefani	Quizz Swanigan	~~Stephanie Rice~~	~~Aaliyah Rose~~	Brandon Royal	~~Davina Leone~~
Gwen Stefani	~~Caroline Sky~~	Jozy Bernadette	Savannah Leighton	Kenny P.	Sammie Zonana
Alicia Keys					
Alicia Keys	Chris Blue	Vanessa Ferguson	Stephanie Rice	**Jack Cassidy**	Ashley Levin
Alicia Keys	Anatalia Villaranda	~~Lilli Passero~~	~~Quizz Swanigan~~	Dawson Coyle	~~Hunter Plake~~
Alicia Keys	~~Felicia Temple~~	~~Autumn Turner~~	RJ Collins	Lauryn Judd	Missy Robertson
Blake Shelton					
Blake Shelton	Lauren Duski	Aliyah Moulden	TSoul	Casi Joy	Aaliyah Rose
Blake Shelton	**Felicia Temple**	Caroline Sky	Enid Ortiz	Andrea Thomas	~~Brennley Brown~~
Blake Shelton	~~Dawson Coyle~~	~~Ashley Levin~~	Josh Hoyer	Valerie Ponzio	Micah Tryba
Note: Italicized names are stolen artists (names struck through within former teams). Bolded names are artists who received the Coach Comeback and advanced to the Live Playoffs.

== Blind auditions ==
Color key

✔	Coach pressed "I WANT YOU" button
	Artist defaulted to this coach's team
	Artist selected to join this coach's team
	Artist eliminated with no coach pressing "I WANT YOU" button

=== Episode 1 (Feb. 27) ===
The coaches performed "Waterfalls" at the start of the show.

Order	Artist	Age	Hometown	Song	Coach's and artist's choices			
Order	Artist	Age	Hometown	Song	Adam	Gwen	Alicia	Blake
1	JChosen (Joshua Hunter)	29	Albany, Georgia	"Sexual Healing"	✔	✔	✔	✔
2	Lauren Duski	25	Gaylord, Michigan	"You Were Meant for Me"	✔	✔	—	✔
3	Johnny Hayes	29	Mobile, Alabama	"Try a Little Tenderness"	✔	✔	—	—
4	Skyler Harris	25	Murfreesboro, Tennessee	"One and Only"	—	—	—	—
5	Anatalia Villaranda	16	Temecula, California	"Runaway Baby"	✔	✔	✔	✔
6	Stephanie Rice	27	Texarkana, Texas	"Piece By Piece"	—	✔	—	✔
7	Branden Martin	25	Owingsville, Kentucky	"Here's a Quarter (Call Someone Who Cares)"	—	—	—	—
8	Mark Isaiah	19	Mount Pocono, Pennsylvania	"Mercy"	✔	✔	—	—
9	Brennley Brown	14	Apple Valley, California	"Stupid Boy"	—	—	✔	✔
10	Shaun Chrisjohn	31	Philadelphia, Pennsylvania	"You Are the Best Thing"	—	—	—	—
11	Felicia Temple	28	Teaneck, New Jersey	"All I Could Do Was Cry"	—	✔	✔	✔

=== Episode 2 (Feb. 28) ===
Order	Artist	Age	Hometown	Song	Coach's and artist's choices			
Order	Artist	Age	Hometown	Song	Adam	Gwen	Alicia	Blake
1	Autumn Turner	25	Montclair, New Jersey	"Last Dance"	✔	✔	✔	✔
2	Jesse Larson	34	Minneapolis, Minnesota	"Jealous Guy"	✔	—	—	—
3	Aliyah Moulden	15	La Habra, California	"Hound Dog"	—	✔	✔	✔
4	Savannah Leighton	16	Spring Garden, Alabama	"Unconditionally"	—	✔	—	✔
5	Nick Townsend	23	Tekamah, Nebraska	"Writing's on the Wall"	—	—	—	—
6	Lilli Passero	26	Los Angeles, California	"A Love of My Own"	—	✔	✔	✔

=== Episode 3 (March 2) ===
Order	Artist	Age	Hometown	Song	Coach's and artist's choices			
Order	Artist	Age	Hometown	Song	Adam	Gwen	Alicia	Blake
1	Ashley Levin	23	Miami, Florida	"Let Him Fly"	—	✔	✔	✔
2	Brandon Royal	31	Saint Thomas, U.S. Virgin Islands	"Master Blaster (Jammin')"	—	✔	—	✔
3	Adam Pearce	30	New Orleans, Louisiana	"A Whiter Shade of Pale"	—	—	—	—
4	Julien Martinez	21	Oxnard, California	"Pride and Joy"	✔	—	—	✔
5	Quizz Swanigan	13	North Little Rock, Arkansas	"Who's Lovin' You"	—	✔	✔	—
6	Casi Joy	26	Kansas City, Missouri	"Blue"	✔	✔	✔	✔

=== Episode 4 (March 6) ===
Order	Artist	Age	Hometown	Song	Coach's and artist's choices			
Order	Artist	Age	Hometown	Song	Adam	Gwen	Alicia	Blake
1	Micah Tryba	24	Wheaton, Illinois	"I'm Every Woman"	—	✔	—	✔
2	Troy Ramey	32	New York City, New York	"Wild World"	✔	✔	✔	✔
3	Ericka Corban	31	Aberdeen, Washington	"Wade in the Water"	—	—	—	—
4	Jack Cassidy	18	Westlake Village, California	"One of Us"	✔	—	✔	—
5	Kawan DeBose	30	Miami, Florida	"Let's Get It On"	✔	✔	—	✔
6	Taylor Alexander	25	Flowery Branch, Georgia	"Believe"	✔	—	—	—
7	Gaby Borromeo	22	Seattle, Washington	"Happy"	✔	—	—	✔
8	Griffin Tucker	14	Dallas, Texas	"Heartbreak Hotel"	—	—	—	—
9	Missy Robertson	34	Sacramento, California	"Scars to Your Beautiful"	—	—	✔	✔
10	Aaliyah Rose	14	Provo, Utah	"Rise Up"	—	✔	—	—
11	Josh West	17	Glendale, Arizona	"Ordinary World"	✔	✔	✔	✔

=== Episode 5 (March 7) ===
Order	Artist	Age	Hometown	Song	Coach's and artist's choices			
Order	Artist	Age	Hometown	Song	Adam	Gwen	Alicia	Blake
1	Johnny Gates	31	Providence, Rhode Island	"Maggie May"	—	✔	✔	✔
2	Malik Davage	23	Washington, D.C.	"Sure Thing"	✔	—	—	—
3	Lauryn Judd	16	Draper, Utah	"Girls Just Want to Have Fun"	—	✔	✔	✔
4	Paul Adrian	20	Irving, Texas	"I Got a Woman"	—	—	—	—
5	Caroline Sky	16	San Anselmo, California	"Will You Love Me Tomorrow"	—	✔	—	✔
6	Josh Hoyer	40	Lincoln, Nebraska	"Oh Girl"	—	✔	—	✔

=== Episode 6 (March 13) ===
Order	Artist	Age	Hometown	Song	Coach's and artist's choices			
Order	Artist	Age	Hometown	Song	Adam	Gwen	Alicia	Blake
1	Kenny P. (Kenny Pengal)	30	Cleveland, Ohio	"Hello It's Me"	—	✔	—	✔
2	Enid Ortiz	25	Tampa, Florida	"All I Ask"	—	—	—	✔
3	RJ Collins	18	Chicago, Illinois	"Purpose"	✔	—	✔	—
4	Austin Tyler Jones	27	Columbia, Tennessee	"Alison"	—	—	—	—
5	TSoul (Terrance Pinkard)	29	Richmond, Virginia	"Take Me to the River"	✔	—	—	✔
6	Andrea Thomas	25	Fort Worth, Texas	"Baby Now That I've Found You"	—	—	—	✔
7	Davina Leone	24	Miami, Florida	"Cheap Thrills"	—	✔	—	—
8	Hanna Eyre	15	Laguna Niguel, California	"Blank Space"	✔	✔	—	✔
9	Casey Jamerson	26	Pendleton, Indiana	"Shadows of the Night"	—	—	—	—
10	Hunter Plake	20	Baton Rouge, Louisiana	"Carry On"	—	✔	✔	—
11	Nala Price	17	Sebring, Florida	"Send My Love (To Your New Lover)"	✔	✔	—	—
12	Sammie Zonana	24	Austin, Texas	"Dangerous Woman"	—	✔	—	—
13	Valerie Ponzio	32	El Paso, Texas	"Ring Of Fire"	✔	✔	✔	✔

=== Episode 7 (March 14) ===
Order	Artist	Age	Hometown	Song	Coach's and artist's choices			
Order	Artist	Age	Hometown	Song	Adam	Gwen	Alicia	Blake
1	Vanessa Ferguson	31	Greensboro, North Carolina	"Don't Let Me Down"	—	✔	✔	✔
2	Dawson Coyle	17	Williamstown, New Jersey	"Happiness"	—	—	—	✔
3	Jozy Bernadette	25	Grand Forks, North Dakota	"American Woman"	✔	✔	—	Team full
4	Stephen Bores	32	Arlington, Illinois	"Three Little Birds"	—	Team full	—	Team full
5	Sheena Brook	33	Fort Myers Beach, Florida	"Baby Girl"	✔	Team full	—	Team full
6	Meshale Akopian	21	Glendale, California	"Me and Bobby McGee"	Team full	Team full	—	Team full
7	Jacob Westfall	23	Portland, Oregon	"Bad Blood"	Team full	Team full	—	Team full
8	Lyndsey Highlander	24	Nashville, Tennessee	"Bring On the Rain"	Team full	Team full	—	Team full
9	Chris Blue	26	Knoxville, Tennessee	"The Tracks of My Tears"	Team full	Team full	✔	Team full

=== Episode 8 (March 15) ===
This episode covered "The Best of the Blind Auditions", which included a recap and a sneak peek for the battles.

== The Battles ==
The Battles round started with episode 9 and ended with episode 12 (broadcast on March 20, 21, 27, 28, 2017). Season twelve's advisors include: John Legend for Team Adam, Celine Dion for Team Gwen, DJ Khaled for Team Alicia and Luke Bryan for Team Blake. Like previous Battles, coaches can steal any two losing artists from another coach.

Color key:

Artist won the Battle and advanced to the Knockouts
Artist lost the Battle but was stolen by another coach and advanced to the Knockouts
Artist lost the Battle and was eliminated

Episode	Coach	Order	Winner	Song	Loser	'Steal' result			
Episode	Coach	Order	Winner	Song	Loser	Adam	Gwen	Alicia	Blake
Episode 9 (Monday, March 20, 2017)	Blake Shelton	1	Lauren Duski	"Better Man"	Brennley Brown	✔	✔	—	—N/a
Episode 9 (Monday, March 20, 2017)	Gwen Stefani	2	JChosen	"I Was Made to Love Her"	Kenny P.	—	—N/a	—	—
Episode 9 (Monday, March 20, 2017)	Alicia Keys	3	Anatalia Villaranda	"Tightrope"	Missy Robertson	—	—	—N/a	—
Episode 9 (Monday, March 20, 2017)	Adam Levine	4	Mark Isaiah	"Pillowtalk"	Gaby Borromeo	—N/a	—	—	—
Episode 9 (Monday, March 20, 2017)	Alicia Keys	5	Quizz Swaingan	"Titanium"	Felicia Temple	—	—	—N/a	✔
Episode 9 (Monday, March 20, 2017)	Blake Shelton	6	Casi Joy	"How Blue"	Ashley Levin	✔	✔	✔	—N/a
Episode 10 (Tuesday, March 21, 2017)	Gwen Stefani	1	Johnny Gates	"I Drove All Night"	Sammie Zonana	—	—N/a	—	—
Episode 10 (Tuesday, March 21, 2017)	Alicia Keys	2	Chris Blue	"Adorn"	RJ Collins	—	—	—N/a	—
Episode 10 (Tuesday, March 21, 2017)	Adam Levine	3	Josh West	"Everybody Wants to Rule the World"	Nala Price	—N/a	—	—	—
Episode 10 (Tuesday, March 21, 2017)	Gwen Stefani	4	Aaliyah Rose	"Treat You Better"	Savannah Leighton	—	—N/a	—	—
Episode 10 (Tuesday, March 21, 2017)	Blake Shelton	5	Andrea Thomas	"What Hurts the Most"	Micah Tryba	—	—	—	—N/a
Episode 10 (Tuesday, March 21, 2017)	Blake Shelton	6	Aliyah Moulden	"Walking on Sunshine"	Dawson Coyle	—	—	✔	—N/a
Episode 11 (Monday, March 27, 2017)	Blake Shelton	1	TSoul	"In the Midnight Hour"	Josh Hoyer	—	—	Team full	—N/a
Episode 11 (Monday, March 27, 2017)	Alicia Keys	2	Vanessa Ferguson	"Killing Me Softly with His Song"	Autumn Turner	✔	✔	Team full	—
Episode 11 (Monday, March 27, 2017)	Adam Levine	3	Johnny Hayes	"Hard to Handle"	Julien Martinez	—N/a	—	Team full	—
Episode 11 (Monday, March 27, 2017)	Gwen Stefani	4	Stephanie Rice	"The First Cut Is the Deepest"	Caroline Sky	—	—N/a	Team full	✔
Episode 11 (Monday, March 27, 2017)	Adam Levine	5	Malik Davage	"Love Me Now"	Kawan DeBose	—N/a	—	Team full	Team full
Episode 11 (Monday, March 27, 2017)	Blake Shelton	6	Enid Ortiz	"Love Triangle"	Valerie Ponzio	—	—	Team full	Team full
Episode 11 (Monday, March 27, 2017)	Adam Levine	7	Hanna Eyre	"Try"	Sheena Brook	—N/a	—	Team full	Team full
Episode 11 (Monday, March 27, 2017)	Gwen Stefani	8	Troy Ramey	"Angel Eyes"	Jozy Bernadette	—	—N/a	Team full	Team full
Episode 11 (Monday, March 27, 2017)	Alicia Keys	9	Jack Cassidy	"Dancing on My Own"	Hunter Plake	✔	✔	Team full	Team full
Episode 12 (Tuesday, March 28, 2017)	Alicia Keys	1	Lilli Passero	"Every Little Bit Hurts"	Lauryn Judd	—	Team full	Team full	Team full
Episode 12 (Tuesday, March 28, 2017)	Adam Levine	2	Jesse Larson	"Shameless"	Taylor Alexander	—N/a	Team full	Team full	Team full
Episode 12 (Tuesday, March 28, 2017)	Gwen Stefani	3	Brandon Royal	"In the Night"	Davina Leone	✔	Team full	Team full	Team full

== The Knockouts ==
The Knockouts round started with episode 13 and ended with episode 15 (broadcast on April 3, 4, 10, 2017). The coaches can each steal one losing artist. The top 20 contestants will then move on to the "Live Shows." Unlike previous Knockouts, there are no key advisors in this round. This was the only season in which all of the artists given the 'Coach Comeback' were from their current teams.

Color key:

Artist won the Knockout and advanced to the live shows
Artist lost the Knockout but was stolen by another coach and advanced to the live shows
Artist lost the Knockout and was originally eliminated but received the Coach Comeback and advanced to the Live Playoffs
Artist lost the Knockout and was eliminated

Episode	Coach	Order	Song	Artists		Song	'Steal' result			
Episode	Coach	Order	Song	Winner	Loser	Song	Adam	Gwen	Alicia	Blake
Episode 13 (Monday, April 3, 2017)	Alicia Keys	1	"Superstition"	Chris Blue	Quizz Swanigan	"Chains"	—	✔	—N/a	—
Episode 13 (Monday, April 3, 2017)	Adam Levine	2	"Bleeding Love"	Hanna Eyre	Autumn Turner	"Respect"	—N/a	Team full	—	—
Episode 13 (Monday, April 3, 2017)	Gwen Stefani	3	"I Want To Know What Love Is"	Hunter Plake	Johnny Gates	"Million Reasons"	—	Team full	—	—
Episode 13 (Monday, April 3, 2017)	Blake Shelton	4	"My Church"	Casi Joy	Felicia Temple	"My Heart Will Go On"	—	Team full	—	—N/a
Episode 13 (Monday, April 3, 2017)	Adam Levine	5	"Carry On Wayward Son"	Josh West	Johnny Hayes	"Statesboro Blues"	—N/a	Team full	—	—
Episode 13 (Monday, April 3, 2017)	Alicia Keys	6	"Fancy"	Ashley Levin	Lilli Passero	"Tears Dry On Their Own"	✔	Team full	—N/a	✔
Episode 14 (Tuesday, April 4, 2017)	Alicia Keys	1	"Two Black Cadillacs"	Anatalia Villaranda	Dawson Coyle	"Demons"	Team full	Team full	—N/a	—
Episode 14 (Tuesday, April 4, 2017)	Blake Shelton	2	"These Arms of Mine"	TSoul	Enid Ortiz	"When We Were Young"	Team full	Team full	—	—N/a
Episode 14 (Tuesday, April 4, 2017)	Gwen Stefani	3	"Up to the Mountain"	Brennley Brown	Aaliyah Rose	"Like I'm Gonna Lose You"	Team full	Team full	—	✔
Episode 15 (Monday, April 10, 2017)	Blake Shelton	1	"When You Say Nothing At All"	Lauren Duski	Andrea Thomas	"Cry"	Team full	Team full	—	Team full
Episode 15 (Monday, April 10, 2017)	Alicia Keys	2	"If I Were Your Woman"	Vanessa Ferguson	Jack Cassidy	"Unsteady"	Team full	Team full	—N/a	Team full
Episode 15 (Monday, April 10, 2017)	Adam Levine	3	"The Letter"	Jesse Larson	Davina Leone	"Toxic"	Team full	Team full	—	Team full
Episode 15 (Monday, April 10, 2017)	Adam Levine	4	"Love Yourself"	Mark Isaiah	Malik Davage	"Rock with You"	Team full	Team full	—	Team full
Episode 15 (Monday, April 10, 2017)	Gwen Stefani	5	"Without You"	JChosen	Brandon Royal	"Redemption Song"	Team full	Team full	—	Team full
Episode 15 (Monday, April 10, 2017)	Blake Shelton	6	"Before He Cheats"	Aliyah Moulden	Caroline Sky	"At Last"	Team full	Team full	—	Team full
Episode 15 (Monday, April 10, 2017)	Gwen Stefani	7	"Chandelier"	Troy Ramey	Stephanie Rice	"Safe & Sound"	Team full	Team full	✔	Team full
Episode 16 (Tuesday, April 11, 2017)	The sixteenth episode was a special one-hour episode titled "The Road to the Live Shows." The episode showed the best moments of the season so far, including the blind auditions, the journey of the top 20 contestants and some unseen footage.									

== Live shows ==
Color key:

Artist was saved by the Public's votes
Artist was saved by his/her coach or was placed in the bottom two, bottom three, or middle three
Artist was saved by the Instant Save
Artist's iTunes vote multiplied by 5 (except The Finals) after his/her studio version of the song reached iTunes top 10
Artist was eliminated

=== Week 1: Live Playoffs (April 17 & 18) ===
Playoff results was voted on in real time, exclusively through Twitter and The Voice app. 12 artists sang live on one of two shows and six were eliminated by the end of each night. As with Seasons 9 & 10, each coach brought back one eliminated artist of their choice to join the top 20 and compete in the Live Playoffs. The Monday's performance featured Teams Alicia and Blake, followed by Teams Adam and Gwen on Tuesday.

Episode	Coach	Order	Artist	Song	Result
Episode 17 (Monday, April 17, 2017)	Blake Shelton	1	Casi Joy	"Parachute"	Eliminated
Episode 17 (Monday, April 17, 2017)	Blake Shelton	2	Felicia Temple	"Defying Gravity"	Eliminated
Episode 17 (Monday, April 17, 2017)	Blake Shelton	3	Aaliyah Rose	"Brass in Pocket"	Eliminated
Episode 17 (Monday, April 17, 2017)	Blake Shelton	4	TSoul	"Knock on Wood"	Blake's choice
Episode 17 (Monday, April 17, 2017)	Blake Shelton	5	Aliyah Moulden	"Mercy"	Public's vote
Episode 17 (Monday, April 17, 2017)	Blake Shelton	6	Lauren Duski	"Someone Else's Star"	Public's vote
Episode 17 (Monday, April 17, 2017)	Alicia Keys	7	Chris Blue	"Love on the Brain"	Public's vote
Episode 17 (Monday, April 17, 2017)	Alicia Keys	8	Anatalia Villaranda	"Stand by Me"	Eliminated
Episode 17 (Monday, April 17, 2017)	Alicia Keys	9	Jack Cassidy	"Don't Let the Sun Go Down on Me"	Eliminated
Episode 17 (Monday, April 17, 2017)	Alicia Keys	10	Vanessa Ferguson	"Lean On"	Public's vote
Episode 17 (Monday, April 17, 2017)	Alicia Keys	11	Ashley Levin	"I Can't Stand the Rain"	Eliminated
Episode 17 (Monday, April 17, 2017)	Alicia Keys	12	Stephanie Rice	"Every Breath You Take"	Alicia's choice
Episode 18 (Tuesday, April 18, 2017)	Gwen Stefani	1	Johnny Gates	"Hands to Myself"	Eliminated
Episode 18 (Tuesday, April 18, 2017)	Gwen Stefani	2	Troy Ramey	"A Case of You"	Gwen's choice
Episode 18 (Tuesday, April 18, 2017)	Gwen Stefani	3	Quizz Swanigan	"My Girl"	Eliminated
Episode 18 (Tuesday, April 18, 2017)	Gwen Stefani	4	Brennley Brown	"Fly"	Public's vote
Episode 18 (Tuesday, April 18, 2017)	Gwen Stefani	5	JChosen	"Nothing Compares 2 U"	Eliminated
Episode 18 (Tuesday, April 18, 2017)	Gwen Stefani	6	Hunter Plake	"Elastic Heart"	Public's vote
Episode 18 (Tuesday, April 18, 2017)	Adam Levine	7	Johnny Hayes	"Ain't Too Proud to Beg"	Eliminated
Episode 18 (Tuesday, April 18, 2017)	Adam Levine	8	Hanna Eyre	"Skyscraper"	Eliminated
Episode 18 (Tuesday, April 18, 2017)	Adam Levine	9	Josh West	"More Than a Feeling"	Eliminated
Episode 18 (Tuesday, April 18, 2017)	Adam Levine	10	Mark Isaiah	"All Time Low"	Adam's choice
Episode 18 (Tuesday, April 18, 2017)	Adam Levine	11	Lilli Passero	"It's Too Late"	Public's vote
Episode 18 (Tuesday, April 18, 2017)	Adam Levine	12	Jesse Larson	"Sir Duke"	Public's vote

=== Week 2: Top 12 (April 24 & 25) ===
The Top 12 performed on Monday, April 24, 2017, with the results following on Tuesday, April 25, 2017. For the next two weeks, the bottom two artists with the fewest votes performed for the Instant Save with one artist being eliminated. For the first time on The Voice, Shania Twain - who advised all the members of the Top 12 - sat in with the other coaches on a fifth chair. iTunes multiplier bonuses was awarded to Brennley Brown (#7).

Episode	Coach	Order	Artist	Song	Result
Episode 19 (Monday, April 24, 2017)	Adam Levine	1	Jesse Larson	"Make You Feel My Love"	Public's vote
Episode 19 (Monday, April 24, 2017)	Adam Levine	2	Mark Isaiah	"One Dance"	Bottom two
Episode 19 (Monday, April 24, 2017)	Alicia Keys	3	Stephanie Rice	"White Flag"	Public's vote
Episode 19 (Monday, April 24, 2017)	Gwen Stefani	4	Troy Ramey	"Free Fallin'"	Bottom two
Episode 19 (Monday, April 24, 2017)	Blake Shelton	5	Aliyah Moulden	"(Love Is Like a) Heat Wave"	Public's vote
Episode 19 (Monday, April 24, 2017)	Alicia Keys	6	Chris Blue	"Love and Happiness"	Public's vote
Episode 19 (Monday, April 24, 2017)	Blake Shelton	7	Lauren Duski	"Lord, I Hope This Day Is Good"	Public's vote
Episode 19 (Monday, April 24, 2017)	Adam Levine	8	Lilli Passero	"Man! I Feel Like A Woman"	Public's vote
Episode 19 (Monday, April 24, 2017)	Gwen Stefani	9	Brennley Brown	"Long, Long Time"	Public's vote
Episode 19 (Monday, April 24, 2017)	Blake Shelton	10	TSoul	"Always on My Mind"	Public's vote
Episode 19 (Monday, April 24, 2017)	Gwen Stefani	11	Hunter Plake	"Somebody That I Used to Know"	Public's vote
Episode 19 (Monday, April 24, 2017)	Alicia Keys	12	Vanessa Ferguson	"A Song For You"	Public's vote
Episode 20 (Tuesday, April 25, 2017)
Episode 20 (Tuesday, April 25, 2017)	Instant Save performances				
Episode 20 (Tuesday, April 25, 2017)	Gwen Stefani	1	Troy Ramey	"Drift Away"	Eliminated
Episode 20 (Tuesday, April 25, 2017)	Adam Levine	2	Mark Isaiah	"When I Was Your Man"	Instant Save

Non-competition performances
Order	Performer	Song
20.1	Adam Levine and his team (Jesse Larson, Lilli Passero and Mark Isaiah)	"Hey Jude"^{1}
20.2	G-Eazy and Kehlani	"Good Life"
20.3	Blake Shelton and his team (Lauren Duski, Aliyah Moulden, and TSoul)	"Crippled Inside"

^{1} Performed as a tribute to season six contestant Christina Grimmie, who had been murdered the previous year.

=== Week 3: Top 11 (May 1 & 2) ===
The Top 11 performed on Monday, May 1, 2017, with the results following on Tuesday, May 2, 2017. iTunes multiplier bonuses were awarded to Lauren Duski (#3) and Hunter Plake (#10).

Episode	Coach	Order	Artist	Song	Result
Episode 21 (Monday, May 1, 2017)	Alicia Keys	1	Stephanie Rice	"Behind Blue Eyes"	Bottom two
Episode 21 (Monday, May 1, 2017)	Blake Shelton	2	Aliyah Moulden	"Take It Back"	Public's vote
Episode 21 (Monday, May 1, 2017)	Blake Shelton	3	TSoul	"Lay Me Down"	Public's vote
Episode 21 (Monday, May 1, 2017)	Adam Levine	4	Lilli Passero	"Town Without Pity"	Public's vote
Episode 21 (Monday, May 1, 2017)	Gwen Stefani	5	Hunter Plake	"All I Want"	Public's vote
Episode 21 (Monday, May 1, 2017)	Alicia Keys	6	Vanessa Ferguson	"Diamonds"	Public's vote
Episode 21 (Monday, May 1, 2017)	Blake Shelton	7	Lauren Duski	"Somewhere in My Broken Heart"	Public's vote
Episode 21 (Monday, May 1, 2017)	Adam Levine	8	Mark Isaiah	"How to Love"	Bottom two
Episode 21 (Monday, May 1, 2017)	Adam Levine	9	Jesse Larson	"Human"	Public's vote
Episode 21 (Monday, May 1, 2017)	Gwen Stefani	10	Brennley Brown	"River"	Public's vote
Episode 21 (Monday, May 1, 2017)	Alicia Keys	11	Chris Blue	"When a Man Loves a Woman"	Public's vote
Episode 22 (Tuesday, May 2, 2017)
Episode 22 (Tuesday, May 2, 2017)	Instant Save performances				
Episode 22 (Tuesday, May 2, 2017)	Alicia Keys	1	Stephanie Rice	"Issues"	Eliminated
Episode 22 (Tuesday, May 2, 2017)	Adam Levine	2	Mark Isaiah	"7 Years"	Instant Save

Non-competition performances
Order	Performer	Song
22.1	Alicia Keys and her team (Chris Blue, Vanessa Ferguson and Stephanie Rice)	"(You Make Me Feel Like) A Natural Woman"
22.2	Gwen Stefani and her team (Brennley Brown and Hunter Plake)	"Fix You"
22.3	Alisan Porter	"Deep Water"

=== Week 4: Top 10 (May 8 & 9) ===
The Top 10 performed Monday, May 8, 2017, with the results following on Tuesday, May 9, 2017. This week featured a double elimination and the bottom three artists were to perform again for the Instant Save. iTunes bonus multiplier were awarded to Plake (#9) and Duski (#10).

Episode	Coach	Order	Artist	Song	Result
Episode 23 (Monday, May 8, 2017)	Adam Levine	1	Jesse Larson	"Jungle Love"	Public's vote
Episode 23 (Monday, May 8, 2017)	Blake Shelton	2	Aliyah Moulden	"Jealous"	Public's vote
Episode 23 (Monday, May 8, 2017)	Alicia Keys	3	Vanessa Ferguson	"Doo Wop (That Thing)"	Bottom three
Episode 23 (Monday, May 8, 2017)	Adam Levine	4	Mark Isaiah	"Sign of the Times"	Bottom three
Episode 23 (Monday, May 8, 2017)	Alicia Keys	5	Chris Blue	"24K Magic"	Public's vote
Episode 23 (Monday, May 8, 2017)	Adam Levine	6	Lilli Passero	"Unforgettable"	Bottom three
Episode 23 (Monday, May 8, 2017)	Blake Shelton	7	Lauren Duski	"Tell Me Why"	Public's vote
Episode 23 (Monday, May 8, 2017)	Gwen Stefani	8	Hunter Plake	"Higher Love"	Public's vote
Episode 23 (Monday, May 8, 2017)	Blake Shelton	9	TSoul	"At This Moment"	Public's vote
Episode 23 (Monday, May 8, 2017)	Gwen Stefani	10	Brennley Brown	"Anyway"	Public's vote
Episode 24 (Tuesday, May 9, 2017)
Episode 24 (Tuesday, May 9, 2017)	Instant Save performances				
Episode 24 (Tuesday, May 9, 2017)	Adam Levine	1	Lilli Passero	"Stormy Weather"	Eliminated
Episode 24 (Tuesday, May 9, 2017)	Adam Levine	2	Mark Isaiah	"Sorry"	Eliminated
Episode 24 (Tuesday, May 9, 2017)	Alicia Keys	3	Vanessa Ferguson	"For Once in My Life"	Instant Save

Non-competition performances
Order	Performer	Song
23.1	Blake Shelton	"Every Time I Hear That Song"
24.1	Maren Morris	"I Could Use a Love Song"
24.2	Charlie Puth	"Attention"

=== Week 5: Semifinals (May 15 & 16) ===
The Top 8 performed on Monday, May 15, 2017, with the results following on Tuesday, May 16, 2017. For the first time, the duets between contestants were part of the competition and public voting, including the bonus awarded for that performance. In the semifinals, three artists would automatically move to next week's finale, the two artists with the fewest votes would be immediately eliminated and the middle three would contend for the remaining spot in the next week's finals via the Instant Save. iTunes bonus multipliers were awarded to Duski (#1), Chris Blue (#2), Aliyah Moulden (#7) and Plake (#10), and for the first time ever, a duet was awarded a bonus with performances for Vanessa Ferguson and Blue (#6).

With the eliminations of Brown and Plake, Stefani no longer has any artists on her team.

Episode	Coach	Order	Artist	Solo Song	Duet Song	Result
Episode 25 (Monday, May 15, 2017)	Gwen Stefani	1 (5)	Hunter Plake	"With or Without You"	"Let it Go"	Middle three
Episode 25 (Monday, May 15, 2017)	Blake Shelton	3 (7)	TSoul	"Ain't No Way"	"I Wish"	Eliminated
Episode 25 (Monday, May 15, 2017)	Gwen Stefani	4 (10)	Brennley Brown	"Suds in the Bucket"	"Good Hearted Woman"	Middle three
Episode 25 (Monday, May 15, 2017)	Blake Shelton	6 (10)	Lauren Duski	"Ghost in This House"	"Good Hearted Woman"	Public's vote
Episode 25 (Monday, May 15, 2017)	Alicia Keys	8 (2)	Chris Blue	"Take Me to the King"	"If I Ain't Got You"	Public's vote
Episode 25 (Monday, May 15, 2017)	Alicia Keys	9 (2)	Vanessa Ferguson	"Superstar"	"If I Ain't Got You"	Eliminated
Episode 25 (Monday, May 15, 2017)	Adam Levine	11 (7)	Jesse Larson	"I Was Wrong"	"I Wish"	Middle three
Episode 25 (Monday, May 15, 2017)	Blake Shelton	12 (5)	Aliyah Moulden	"I Can Only Imagine"	"Let it Go"	Public's vote
Episode 26 (Tuesday, May 16, 2017)
Episode 26 (Tuesday, May 16, 2017)	Instant Save performances					
Episode 26 (Tuesday, May 16, 2017)	Gwen Stefani	1	Brennley Brown	"Warrior"		Eliminated
Episode 26 (Tuesday, May 16, 2017)	Gwen Stefani	2	Hunter Plake	"Love Runs Out"		Eliminated
Episode 26 (Tuesday, May 16, 2017)	Adam Levine	3	Jesse Larson	"Tennessee Whiskey"		Instant Save

Non-competition performances
Order	Performer	Song
26.1	Big Boi featuring Adam Levine	"Mic Jack"
26.2	DNCE	"Kissing Strangers"

=== Week 6: Finale (May 22 & 23) ===
The Top 4 performed on Monday, May 22, 2017, with the final results following on Tuesday, May 23, 2017. Finalists performed a solo cover song, a duet with their coach, and an original song. iTunes bonus multipliers were awarded to Duski (#1 and #2), Blue (#3 and #9), Jesse Larson (#5) and Moulden (#7). All iTunes votes received for the five weeks leading up to the finale were cumulatively added to online and app finale votes for each finalist.

Coach	Artist	Order	Solo Song	Order	Duet Song (With coach)	Order	Original Song	Result
Blake Shelton	Aliyah Moulden	10	"Signed, Sealed, Delivered I'm Yours"	5	"Dancing in the Street"	1	"Never Be Lonely"	Third place
Adam Levine	Jesse Larson	2	"Takin' It to the Streets"	7	"Let's Go Crazy"	9	"Woman"	Fourth place
Alicia Keys	Chris Blue	12	"Rhythm Nation"	3	"Diamonds and Pearls"	6	"Money on You"	Winner
Blake Shelton	Lauren Duski	4	"The Dance"	8	"There's a Tear in My Beer"	11	"Deja Vu"	Runner-up

Non-competition performances
Order	Performer	Song
28.1	Luis Fonsi, Daddy Yankee and Mark Isaiah	"Despacito"
28.2	Rascal Flatts and Brennley Brown	"Yours If You Want It"
28.3	CeeLo Green and Jesse Larson	"Shining Star"
28.4	Little Big Town and Lauren Duski	"Better Man"
28.5	Gwen Stefani and Hunter Plake	"Don't Speak"
28.6	Zedd and Alessia Cara	"Stay"
28.7	Usher and Chris Blue	"Everybody Hurts"
28.8	Chris Stapleton	"Either Way"
28.9	Gladys Knight, TSoul and Vanessa Ferguson	"You're the Best Thing That Ever Happened to Me" / "If I Were Your Woman"
28.10	Miley Cyrus	"Malibu"
28.11	Alessia Cara and Aliyah Moulden	"Scars to Your Beautiful"
28.12	Jennifer Hudson	"Remember Me"
28.13	Chris Blue (winner)	"Money on You"

== Elimination chart ==
=== Overall ===
Color key
Artist's info

- Team Adam
- Team Gwen
- Team Alicia
- Team Blake

Result details

- Winner
- Runner-up
- Third place
- Fourth place
- Saved by Instant Save (via Twitter)
- Saved by the public
- Saved by his/her coach
- Eliminated

Live show results per week
Artists	Week 1 Playoffs	Week 2	Week 3	Week 4	Week 5	Week 6 Finale
Chris Blue	Safe	Safe	Safe	Safe	Safe	Winner
Lauren Duski	Safe	Safe	Safe	Safe	Safe	Runner-up
Aliyah Moulden	Safe	Safe	Safe	Safe	Safe	3rd place
Jesse Larson	Safe	Safe	Safe	Safe	Safe	4th place
Hunter Plake	Safe	Safe	Safe	Safe	Eliminated	Eliminated (Week 5)
Brennley Brown	Safe	Safe	Safe	Safe	Eliminated	Eliminated (Week 5)
Vanessa Ferguson	Safe	Safe	Safe	Safe	Eliminated	Eliminated (Week 5)
TSoul	Safe	Safe	Safe	Safe	Eliminated	Eliminated (Week 5)
Lilli Passero	Safe	Safe	Safe	Eliminated	Eliminated (Week 4)	
Mark Isaiah	Safe	Safe	Safe	Eliminated	Eliminated (Week 4)	
Stephanie Rice	Safe	Safe	Eliminated	Eliminated (Week 3)		
Troy Ramey	Safe	Eliminated	Eliminated (Week 2)			
Jack Cassidy	Eliminated	Eliminated (Week 1)				
Hanna Eyre	Eliminated	Eliminated (Week 1)				
Johnny Gates	Eliminated	Eliminated (Week 1)				
Johnny Hayes	Eliminated	Eliminated (Week 1)				
JChosen	Eliminated	Eliminated (Week 1)				
Casi Joy	Eliminated	Eliminated (Week 1)				
Ashley Levin	Eliminated	Eliminated (Week 1)				
Aaliyah Rose	Eliminated	Eliminated (Week 1)				
Quizz Swanigan	Eliminated	Eliminated (Week 1)				
Felicia Temple	Eliminated	Eliminated (Week 1)				
Anatalia Villaranda	Eliminated	Eliminated (Week 1)				
Josh West	Eliminated	Eliminated (Week 1)				

=== Team ===
Color key
Artist's info

- Team Adam
- Team Gwen
- Team Alicia
- Team Blake

Result details

- Winner
- Runner-up
- Third place
- Fourth Place
- Eliminated
- Artist Saved by Instant Save (via Twitter)
- Artist received one or more iTunes bonus that week
- Number of iTunes bonuses received
- Teams are in 3 artists
- No artists remaining on his/her team

Artist	Week 1 Playoffs	Week 2	Week 3	Week 4	Week 5	Week 6 Finale
Jesse Larson	Public's choice	Advanced	Advanced	Advanced	Advanced	Fourth place
Lilli Passero	Public's choice	Advanced	Advanced	Eliminated		
Mark Isaiah	Coach's choice	Advanced	Advanced	Eliminated		
Hanna Eyre	Eliminated					
Johnny Hayes	Eliminated					
Josh West	Eliminated					
Hunter Plake	Public's choice	Advanced	Advanced	Advanced	Eliminated	
Brennley Brown	Public's choice	Advanced	Advanced	Advanced	Eliminated	
Troy Ramey	Coach's Choice	Eliminated				
Johnny Gates	Eliminated					
JChosen	Eliminated					
Quizz Swanigan	Eliminated					
Chris Blue	Public's choice	Advanced	Advanced	Advanced	Advanced	Winner
Vanessa Ferguson	Public's choice	Advanced	Advanced	Advanced	Eliminated	
Stephanie Rice	Coach's Choice	Advanced	Eliminated			
Jack Cassidy	Eliminated					
Ashley Levin	Eliminated					
Anatalia Villaranda	Eliminated					
Lauren Duski	Public's choice	Advanced	Advanced	Advanced	Advanced	Runner-up
Aliyah Moulden	Public's choice	Advanced	Advanced	Advanced	Advanced	Third place
TSoul	Coach's Choice	Advanced	Advanced	Advanced	Eliminated	
Casi Joy	Eliminated					
Aaliyah Rose	Eliminated					
Felicia Temple	Eliminated					

Rank	Coach	Top 12	Top 11	Top 10	Top 8	Top 6	Top 4
1	Alicia Keys	3	3	2	2	1	1
2	Blake Shelton	3	3	3	3	2	2
3	Adam Levine	3	3	3	1	1	1
4	Gwen Stefani	3	2	2	2	2	0

== Contestants who appeared on previous shows or seasons ==
- Anatalia Villaranda was a Top 51 auditionee from the fifteenth season of American Idol.
- Johnny Hayes was on the eleventh season of The Voice but received no chair turns.
- Brennley Brown was on the eleventh season of America's Got Talent but was eliminated in the Judge Cuts round.
- Micah Tryba appeared on the Sing it On YouTube / docu-series in 2015. The show featured collegiate a cappella groups competing for the International Championship of Collegiate a Cappella.
- Griffin Tucker who failed to turn a chair, auditioned for the sixteenth season of American Idol and was eliminated during Hollywood Week.
- Nick Townsend who failed to turn a chair, auditioned for the seventeenth season of American Idol and was eliminated during Showcase Week.
- Aliyah Moulden stars on the web series Chicken Girls as Luna.
- Aaliyah Rose later went on Building the Band, where she became 1/4 of the vocal group SZN4. The group placed 2nd in the competition.

== Ratings ==
Episode		Original airdate	Production	Time slot (ET)	Viewers (in millions)	Adults (18–49)		Source
Episode		Original airdate	Production	Time slot (ET)	Viewers (in millions)	Rating	Share	Source
1	"The Blind Auditions Premiere, Night 1"	February 27, 2017	1201	Monday 8:00 p.m.	13.03	3.1	11	
2	"The Blind Auditions Premiere, Night 2"	February 28, 2017	1202	Tuesday 8:00 p.m.	11.42	2.6	9	
3	"The Blind Auditions Premiere, Night 3"	March 2, 2017	1203	Thursday 8:00 p.m.	10.69	2.3	8	
4	"The Blind Auditions, Part 4"	March 6, 2017	1204	Monday 8:00 p.m.	12.13	2.7	9	
5	"The Blind Auditions, Part 5"	March 7, 2017	1205	Tuesday 8:00 p.m.	11.62	2.6	9	
6	"The Blind Auditions, Part 6"	March 13, 2017	1206	Monday 8:00 p.m.	12.18	2.6	9	
7	"The Blind Auditions, Part 7"	March 14, 2017	1207	Tuesday 8:00 p.m.	11.71	2.5	9	
8	"The Best of the Blind Auditions"	March 15, 2017	1208	Wednesday 8:00 p.m.	7.63	1.6	6	
9	"The Battles Premiere, Part 1"	March 20, 2017	1209	Monday 8:00 p.m.	10.74	2.4	8	
10	"The Battles Premiere, Part 2"	March 21, 2017	1210	Tuesday 8:00 p.m.	10.84	2.3	9	
11	"The Battles, Part 3"	March 27, 2017	1211	Monday 8:00 p.m.	10.56	2.4	9	
12	"The Battles, Part 4"	March 28, 2017	1212	Tuesday 8:00 p.m.	10.22	2.1	8	
13	"The Knockouts Premiere, Part 1"	April 3, 2017	1213	Monday 8:00 p.m.	10.04	2.2	7	
14	"The Knockouts Premiere, Part 2"	April 4, 2017	1214	Tuesday 8:00 p.m.	9.53	1.9	7	
15	"The Knockouts, Part 3"	April 10, 2017	1215	Monday 8:00 p.m.	9.88	2.1	8	
16	"Road to the Live Shows"	April 11, 2017	1216	Tuesday 8:00 p.m.	7.76	1.6	7	
17	"The Live Playoffs, Night 1"	April 17, 2017	1217	Monday 8:00 p.m.	9.57	2.0	7	
18	"The Live Playoffs, Night 2"	April 18, 2017	1218	Tuesday 8:00 p.m.	8.85	1.8	7	
19	"Live Top 12, Performance"	April 24, 2017	1219	Monday 8:00 p.m.	9.27	1.9	7	
20	"Live Top 12, Results"	April 25, 2017	1220	Tuesday 8:00 p.m.	9.63	1.8	7	
21	"Live Top 11, Performance"	May 1, 2017	1221	Monday 8:00 p.m.	9.08	1.8	7	
22	"Live Top 11, Results"	May 2, 2017	1222	Tuesday 8:00 p.m.	8.82	1.6	7	
23	"Live Top 10, Performance"	May 8, 2017	1223	Monday 8:00 p.m.	9.34	1.9	7	
24	"Live Top 10, Results"	May 9, 2017	1224	Tuesday 8:00 p.m.	8.69	1.7	7	
25	"Live Top 8 Semi-Finals, Performance"	May 15, 2017	1225	Monday 8:00 p.m.	9.11	1.8	7	
26	"Live Top 8 Semi-Finals, Results"	May 16, 2017	1226	Tuesday 8:00 p.m.	8.65	1.5	7	
27	"Live Finale, Performance"	May 22, 2017	1227	Monday 8:00 p.m.	9.65	2.0	7	
28	"Live Finale Results"	May 23, 2017	1228	Tuesday 9:00 p.m.	9.35	1.9	7	
