= The Fighters (Chad Brownlee album) =

Studio album by Chad Brownlee
- Released: June 3, 2014
- Genre: Country
- Length: 37:31
- Label: MDM Recordings
- Producer: Mitch Merrett

Chad Brownlee chronology
Love Me or Leave Me (2012)	The Fighters (2014)	Hearts on Fire (2016)

Singles from The Fighters
- 1. "Where the Party At?" Released: September 2013; 2. "Fallin' Over You" Released: March 2014; 3. "Just Because" Released: July 2014; 4. "When the Lights Go Down" Released: December 2014

Professional ratings
Review scores
Source	Rating
Top Country	4/5 stars

The Fighters is the third studio album by Canadian country music artist Chad Brownlee. It was released on June 3, 2014 via MDM Recordings. The album includes the singles "Where the Party At?", "Fallin' Over You", "Just Because", and "When the Lights Go Down".

== Critical reception ==
Shenieka Russell-Metcalf of Top Country gave the album four stars out of five, writing that "the album as a whole provides listeners with strong vocals and well-crafted tracks from start to finish."

== Track listing ==
No.	Title	Writer(s)	Length
1.	"When the Lights Go Down"	Chad Brownlee, Mitch Merrett	3:09
2.	"Fallin' Over You"	Dennis Matkosky, Terry Sawchuk, Matt Alderman	3:16
3.	"The Fighters"	Brownlee, Merrett	3:48
4.	"Matches"	Brownlee, Merrett, Brian White	4:03
5.	"Stay"	Brownlee, Merrett, White	4:03
6.	"Left"	Adam Hambrick	3:23
7.	"Hello"	Ashley Gorley, Shane McAnally	3:14
8.	"Let 'Em Have It"	Brownlee, Merrett	3:32
9.	"Just Because"	Merrett, White	2:48
10.	"Where the Party At?"	Kelly Archer, Erik Dylan, Justin Weaver	3:11
11.	"We Don't Walk This Road Alone"	Brownlee, Merrett, White	3:04
Total length:			37:31

== Chart performance ==
=== Singles ===
Year	Single	Peak chart positions	
Year	Single	CAN Country	CAN
2013	"Where the Party At?"	13	100
2014	"Fallin' Over You"	10	66
2014	"Just Because"	11	98
2014	"When the Lights Go Down"	11	81
