= Chad Brownlee (album) =

Studio album by Chad Brownlee
- Released: August 31, 2010
- Genre: Country
- Length: 47:35
- Label: MDM Recordings
- Producer: Mitch Merrett

Chad Brownlee chronology
Chad Brownlee (2010)	Love Me or Leave Me (2012)

Singles from Chad Brownlee
- 1. "The Best That I Can (Superhero)" Released: October 2009; 2. "Hope" Released: February 8, 2010; 3. "Hood of My Car" Released: June 21, 2010; 4. "Day After You" Released: December 20, 2010; 5. "Carried Away" Released: May 16, 2011

Chad Brownlee is the debut studio album by Canadian country music artist Chad Brownlee. It was released on August 31, 2010, by MDM Recordings. The album's third single, "Hood of My Car", charted on the Canadian Hot 100.

== Track listing ==
No.	Title	Length
1.	"Lay Down the Tailgate"	4:00
2.	"The Best That I Can (Superhero)"	3:48
3.	"You're Not Alone"	3:49
4.	"Tell Me Something I Don't Know"	4:37
5.	"Hood of My Car"	3:19
6.	"Hope"	4:50
7.	"Re-Write Yesterday"	4:20
8.	"Carry On"	4:25
9.	"Day After You"	3:41
10.	"Another Now"	3:40
11.	"Another Page Is Written"	2:51
12.	"Carried Away"	4:15

== Chart performance ==
=== Singles ===
Year	Single	Peak positions	
Year	Single	CAN Country	CAN
2009	"The Best That I Can (Superhero)"	20	—
2010	"Hope"	47	—
2010	"Hood of My Car"	14	96
2010	"Day After You"	9	—
2011	"Carried Away"	19	—
"—" denotes releases that did not chart
