= Da Pump discography =

- Studio albums: 8
- Live albums: 1
- Compilation albums: 3
- Singles: 32
- Remix albums: 2

Since their major label debut in 1997, Japanese male vocal/dance unit Da Pump has released eight studio albums, two compilations, one live album, one remix album and twenty six singles. Two of their albums, Beat Ball (2000) and Da Best of Da Pump (2001) have topped the Oricon album charts. The latter album is their most commercially successful album having garnered over a million in sales.

== Albums ==
=== Studio albums ===
| Title | Album details | Peak chart positions | Certifications |
| Title | Album details | JPN | Certifications |
|---|---|---|---|
| Expression | Released: July 23, 1998; Label: Avex Trax; Format: CD | 3 | RIAJ: 2× Platinum |
| Higher and Higher! | Released: July 28, 1999; Label: Avex Trax; Format: CD | 2 | RIAJ: Platinum |
| Beat Ball | Released: July 19, 2000; Label: Avex Trax; Format: CD | 1 | RIAJ: Platinum |
| The Next Exit | Released: February 20, 2000; Label: Avex Trax; Format: CD | 3 | RIAJ: Platinum |
| Shippuu Ranbu -Episode II- (疾風乱舞 -Episode II-) | Released: July 7, 2004; Label: Avex Trax; Format: CD, CD+DVD | 5 | |
| Lequios | Released: December 28, 2005; Label: Avex Trax; Format: CD, CD+DVD | 44 | |
| Da Pop Colors | Released: March 23, 2022; Label: Sonic Groove; Format: CD+DVD, CD+Blu-ray | 10 | |
| Back 2 da Unity | Released: July 9, 2025; Label: Sonic Groove; Format: CD | 7 | |

=== Compilation albums ===
| Title | Album details | Peak chart positions | Certifications |
| Title | Album details | JPN | Certifications |
|---|---|---|---|
| Da Best of Da Pump | Released: February 28, 2001; Label: Avex Trax; Format: CD, CD+DVD | 1 | RIAJ: 3× Platinum |
| Da Best of Da Pump 2 plus 4 | Released: March 28, 2006; Label: Avex Trax; Format: CD, CD+DVD | 50 | |
| Thanx!!!!!!! Neo Best of Da Pump | Released: December 12, 2018; Label: Avex Trax; Format: CD, CD+DVD | 2 | RIAJ: Gold |

=== Remix albums ===
| Title | Album details | Peak chart positions | Certifications |
| Title | Album details | JPN | Certifications |
|---|---|---|---|
| Da Best Remix of Da Pump | Released: August 29, 2001; Label: Avex Trax; Format: CD | 3 | RIAJ: Gold |
| m.c.A・T Da Pump Mix | Released: March 17, 2021; Label: Avex Trax; Format: CD | 17 | |

=== Live albums ===
| Title | Album details | Peak chart positions |
| Title | Album details | JPN |
|---|---|---|
| Da Best of Da Pump Japan Tour 2003 Reborn | Released: November 27, 2003; Label: Avex Trax; Format: CD | 40 |

== Singles ==
| Title | Year | Peak chart positions | Album |
| Title | Year | JPN | Album |
|---|---|---|---|
| "Feelin' Good -It's Paradise-" | 1997 | 15 | Expression |
| "Love is the Final Liberty" | 1997 | 8 | Expression |
| "Stay Together" | 1998 | 16 | Expression |
| "Gokigendaze ~Nothing but Something~" (ごきげんだぜっ! 〜Nothing But Something〜) | 1998 | 18 | Expression |
| "Rhapsody in Blue" | 1998 | 8 | Expression |
| "Around the World" | 1998 | 10 | Higher and Higher! |
| "Joyful" | 1999 | 9 | Higher and Higher! |
| "Crazy Beat Goes On" | 1999 | 5 | Higher and Higher! |
| "We Can't Stop the Music" | 1999 | 4 | Beat Ball |
| "I Wonder..." | 2000 | 14 | Beat Ball |
| "Com'on! Be My Girl!" | 2000 | 10 | Beat Ball |
| "If..." | 2000 | 11 | Da Best of Da Pump |
| "Purple the Orion" | 2001 | 3 | Da Best of Da Pump |
| "Corazon" | 2001 | 4 | The Next Exit |
| "Steppin' and Shakin'" | 2001 | 5 | The Next Exit |
| "All My Love To You" | 2001 | 6 | The Next Exit |
| "Rain of Pain" | 2002 | 4 | Da Best of Da Pump 2 plus 4 |
| "Night Walk" | 2003 | 8 | Shippuu Ranbu -Episode II- |
| "Circle of Life" | 2003 | 16 | Da Best of Da Pump 2 plus 4 |
| "Get on the Dance Floor" | 2004 | 14 | Shippuu Ranbu -Episode II- |
| "Mune Kogasu..." (胸焦がす...) | 2004 | 6 | Lequios |
| "Like This" | 2005 | 19 | Lequios |
| "Bright! Our Future" | 2005 | 12 | Lequios |
| "Alright!" | 2006 | 21 | Non-album singles |
| "Christmas Night" | 2006 | 41 | Non-album singles |
| "Summer Rider" | 2009 | 22 | Non-album singles |
| "Can’t Get Your Love / If...arekarabokura" | 2011 | 46 | Non-album singles |
| "New Position" | 2014 | 11 | Non-album singles |
| "U.S.A." | 2018 | 7 | Da Pop Colors |
| "Sakura" (桜) | 2019 | 5 | Da Pop Colors |
| "P.A.R.T.Y. ～Universe Festival～" (P.A.R.T.Y. 〜ユニバース・フェスティバル〜) | 2019 | 3 | Da Pop Colors |
| "Heart on Fire" | 2020 | 4 | Da Pop Colors |
| "〜Fantasista〜 (ファンタジスタ〜) | 2020 | 7 | Da Pop Colors |
| "Dream on the Street" | 2021 | 1 | Da Pop Colors |
| "Tsumugi" (紡) | 2021 | 3 | Da Pop Colors |
| "Sunrise MooN ~Let's go to space~" (サンライズ・ムーン〜宇宙に行こう〜) | 2023 | 9 | Back 2 da Unity |
| "Use Your Body / E-NERGY BOYS" | 2024 | 8 | Back 2 da Unity |
