= Hearts on Fire (Chad Brownlee song) =

Single by Chad Brownlee

from the album Hearts on Fire
- Released: November 27, 2015
- Genre: Country
- Length: 3:14
- Label: MDM Recordings
- Songwriter(s): Erik Dylan; Angelo Petraglia

Chad Brownlee singles chronology
"Thinking Out Loud" (2015)	"Hearts on Fire" (2015)	"I Hate You for It" (2016)

"Hearts on Fire" is a song written by Erik Dylan and Angelo Petraglia, and recorded by Canadian country artist Chad Brownlee for his 2016 extended play of the same name. It was released November 27, 2015 by MDM Recordings Inc. as the record's lead single.

== Critical reception ==
Kerry Doole of New Canadian Music wrote that "Hearts on Fire" is "a well-constructed song that gradually builds in intensity," and "showcases Brownlee's virile and convincing vocals nicely."

== Music video ==
An accompanying music video was directed by Stephano Barberis and premiered December 9, 2015. It reached the top ten on CMT Canada's Chevy Top 20 Countdown.

== Charts ==
"Hearts on Fire" peaked at number eight on the Billboard Canada Country chart in March 2016, becoming Brownlee's highest-charting single at the time. This peak would later be surpassed by "Somethin' We Shouldn't Do" the following year.

Chart (2015–16)	Peak position
Canada Country (Billboard)	8
