= Money on You (Chris Blue song) =

Single by Chris Blue
- Released: May 22, 2017
- Recorded: 2017
- Genre: Dance soul
- Length: 3:14
- Label: Republic
- Songwriters: Mike Dupree; JHart; Scribz Riley; Talay Riley; Tinashe Sibanda
- Producers: Tinashe Sibanda; Mike Dupree

"Money on You" is a song by American soul singer Chris Blue. It was Blue's coronation single following his victory on the 12th season of the singing competition The Voice. The song was written by Mike Dupree, JHart, Scribz Riley, Talay Riley and Tinashe Sibanda.

== Live performances ==
Blue performed the song live for the first time in the grand finale of The Voice on May 23, 2017.

== Charts ==
Chart (2017)	Peak position
US Billboard Hot 100	66
US Hot R&B/Hip-Hop Songs (Billboard)	28

== Release history ==
Country	Date	Format	Label	Ref.
United States	May 22, 2017	Digital download	Republic Records	
