= Money on You (Chad Brownlee song) =

2020 song by Chad Brownlee

"Money On You"

Single by Chad Brownlee

from the album Back in the Game
- Released: January 10, 2020
- Genre: Country
- Length: 3:16
- Label: Universal Canada
- Songwriters: Chad Brownlee; Gavin Slate; Todd Clark; Travis Wood
- Producer: Todd Clark

Chad Brownlee singles chronology
| "The Way You Roll" (2019) | "Money On You" (2020) | "The Country Kind" (2023) |

Music video
- "Money On You" (Acoustic) on YouTube

"Money On You" is a song co-written and recorded by Canadian country artist Chad Brownlee. He wrote the song with Gavin Slate, Travis Wood, and producer Todd Clark. It was released as a single from the deluxe edition of Brownlee's studio album Back in the Game.

== Background ==
Brownlee stated that the song is "a fresh vibe musically you haven’t heard from me before about betting it all on a relationship". He said he picked the song to be a single largely because "the message is positive to help balance out all the negative content that we are bombarded with on a daily basis".

== Commercial performance ==
"Money On You" peaked at number seven on the Billboard Canada Country chart, marking Brownlee's thirteenth top ten hit. It also reached a peak of number 96 on the Canadian Hot 100.

== Charts ==
| Chart (2020) | Peak position |
|---|---|
| Canada (Canadian Hot 100) | 96 |
| Canada Country (Billboard) | 7 |
