= Hearts on Fire (company) =

American diamond manufacturer and jewelry design company

Hearts On Fire Company, LLC
- Company type: Subsidiary
- Industry: Retail
- Founded: 1996
- Founder: Glenn and Susan Rothman
- Headquarters: 36/F, New World Tower, Hong Kong, Hong Kong
- Number of locations: 690
- Area served: Worldwide
- Key people: Rita Maltez (Global President)
- Products: Jewelry
- Owner: Chow Tai Fook Jewellery Group Ltd.
- Number of employees: 197
- Website: www.heartsonfire.com

Hearts On Fire is a diamond jewelry brand marketed by the Chow Tai Fook Jewellery Group of Hong Kong. The brand was founded in 1996 in Boston, Massachusetts, United States, and purchased by Chow Tai Fook in 2014.

== Company history ==
- 1996: Hearts On Fire founded by Glenn and Susan Rothman in Boston, Massachusetts, United States
- 1998: The company established a presence to Asia-Pacific region and the Caribbean.
- 1999: The company launched its first collection of diamond jewelry, creating diamond rings and earrings.
- 2002: Hearts On Fire obtained a design patent for its "Dream" design, a 69-facet modified square cut.
- 2006: Partnered with lingerie company Victoria's Secret to create one of the world's most expensive bras, the Victoria's Secret Hearts On Fire Diamond Fantasy Bra, valued at US$6.5 million.
- 2008: Launched a diamond chandelier using more than 3,300 diamonds weighing over 1,000 carats to celebrate the 60th anniversary of the Emmy Awards.
- 2014: Hearts On Fire was sold to Chow Tai Fook Jewellery Group, one of the world's largest retailers of jewelry, for US$150 million.
- April 2021: Chow Tai Fook named Rita Maltez the Global President of Hearts On Fire
- May 2022: Chow Tai Fook named Rebecca Foerster President of Hearts On Fire, North America
- September 2023: Chow Tai Fook named Yunjo Lee, Chief Creative Officer of Hearts on Fire
