= Love Me or Leave Me (Chad Brownlee album) =

Studio album by Chad Brownlee
- Released: February 14, 2012
- Genre: Country
- Length: 37:55
- Label: MDM Recordings
- Producer: Mitch Merrett

Chad Brownlee chronology
Chad Brownlee (2010)	Love Me or Leave Me (2012)	The Fighters (2014)

Singles from Love Me or Leave Me
- 1. "Love Me or Leave Me" Released: September 2011; 2. "Smoke in the Rain" Released: February 13, 2012; 3. "Listen" Released: July 2012; 4. "Crash" Released: February 2013

Love Me or Leave Me is the second studio album by Canadian country music artist Chad Brownlee. It was released on February 14, 2012, by MDM Recordings. The album contains the singles, "Smoke in the Rain," "Listen", and Crash", which all charted on the Canadian Hot 100.

Love Me or Leave Me was nominated for Country Album of the Year at the 2013 Juno Awards.

== Track listing ==
No.	Title	Length
1.	"Crash"	3:33
2.	"Listen"	3:50
3.	"Love Me or Leave Me"	3:41
4.	"If It Was Up to Me"	3:38
5.	"Smoke in the Rain"	3:23
6.	"His Own Terms (Ballad of Eldon McCain)"	4:56
7.	"Gimme the Love"	3:21
8.	"Radio Up"	3:34
9.	"Leave Here Dying Young"	3:24
10.	"Wagon Wheel"	4:35

== Chart performance ==
=== Singles ===
Year	Single	Peak chart positions	
Year	Single	CAN Country	CAN
2011	"Love Me or Leave Me"	8	—
2012	"Smoke in the Rain"	8	74
2012	"Listen"	9	85
2013	"Crash"	10	91
"—" denotes releases that did not chart
