= Chad Brownlee =

Canadian musician (born 1984)

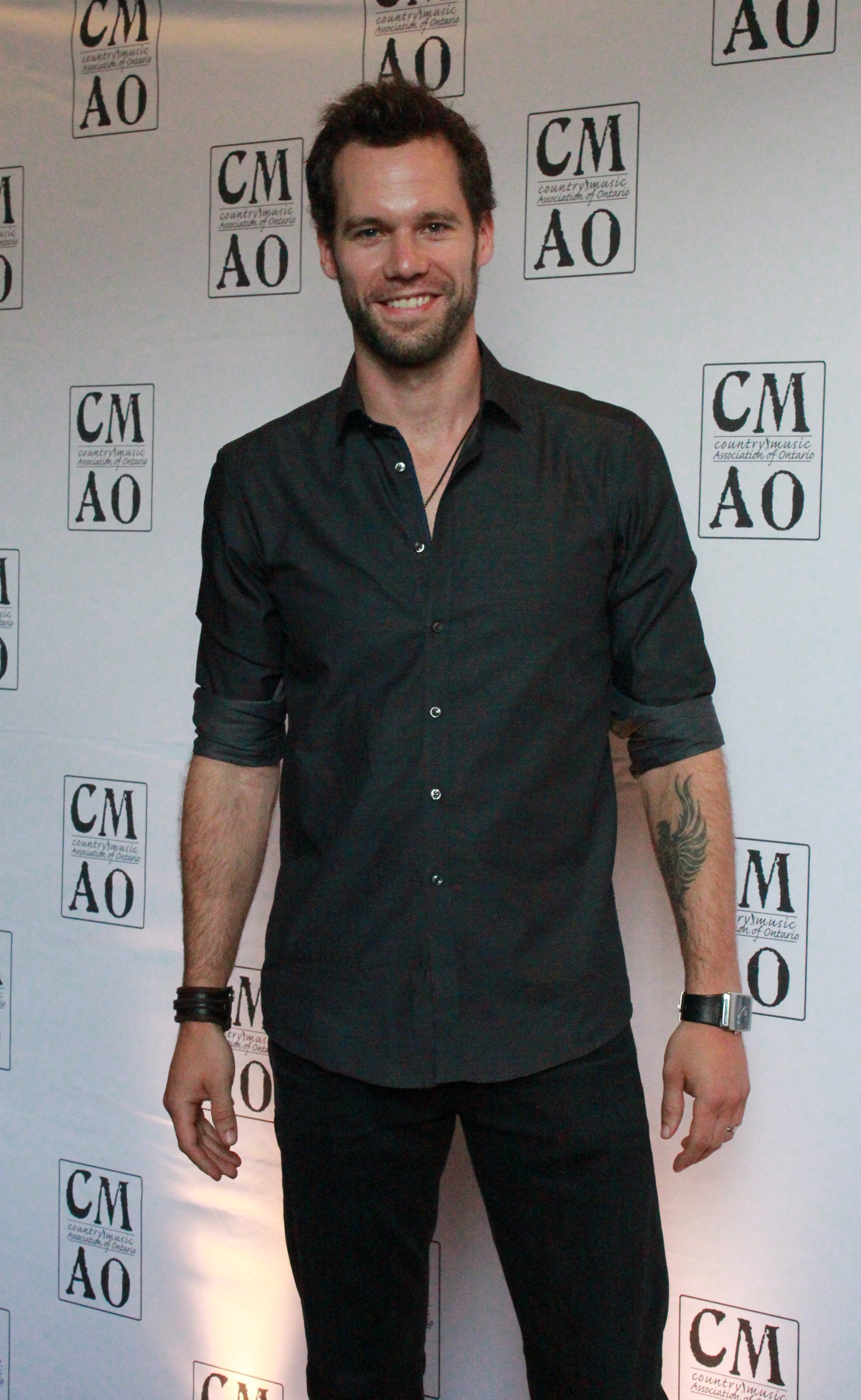
- Brownlee in 2015

Background information
- Born: July 12, 1984 (age 42)
- Origin: Kelowna, British Columbia, Canada
- Genres: Country; country pop; country rock
- Occupation: Singer-songwriter
- Instruments: Vocals, guitar
- Years active: 2003–present
- Label: Universal Music Canada • MDM Recordings
- Website: chadbrownlee.com
Ice hockey career
- Height: 6 ft 2 in (188 cm)
- Weight: 200 lb (91 kg; 14 st 4 lb)
- Position: Defenceman
- Shot: Right
- Played for: Idaho Steelheads
- NHL draft: 190th overall, 2003; Vancouver Canucks
- Playing career: 2007–2008

Chad Brownlee (born July 12, 1984) is a Canadian country music singer-songwriter. He has one #1 Canada Country hit with "Forever's Gotta Start Somewhere".

== Sports career ==
Brownlee was a draft pick for the Vancouver Canucks in 2003, going in the sixth round No. 190th overall. After four years of playing for the NCAA's Minnesota State Mavericks (located in Mankato, Minn.), Brownlee made his professional debut with the ECHL's Idaho Steelheads playing a lone season with the club in the 2007–08 season before ending his playing career.

== Music career ==
Following a series of injuries, he turned his attention to music the following year. His first single, "The Best That I Can (Superhero)", was released in November 2009. Brownlee's self-titled debut album, produced by Mitch Merrett, was released in August 2010 via MDM Recordings. He followed it up with Love Me or Leave Me in 2012. Brownlee was nominated for a Juno Award for Country Album of the Year on February 19, 2013. The awards took place on April 21 in Regina, Saskatchewan. Brownlee's third album, The Fighters, was released on June 3, 2014.

Brownlee landed his first No. 1 hit with "Forever's Gotta Start Somewhere" in April 2019. It was included on the EP Back in the Game, which was released on June 21, 2019, via Universal Music Canada. Brownlee extended that to become his fourth album on January 10, 2020. A July 2020 Nielsen Music study found Brownlee to be the eighth-highest played Canadian artist on domestic radio in the first half of 2020, ahead of Brett Kissel and JP Saxe, and behind Dallas Smith and Drake.

In 2023, Brownlee ended a prolonged hiatus and released the single "The Country Kind".

== Acting career ==
Brownlee's first role as an actor came in 2010 film Tooth Fairy as an unnamed hockey player with no lines. He appeared in the 2021 film Range Roads as Bruce, the ex-boyfriend of the main character Frankie.

== Discography ==
=== Albums ===
Title	Details
Chad Brownlee	Release date: August 31, 2010; Label: MDM Recordings
Love Me or Leave Me	Release date: February 14, 2012; Label: MDM Recordings/EMI
The Fighters	Release date: June 3, 2014; Label: MDM Recordings/Universal Music Canada
Back in the Game	Release date: June 21, 2019; Label: Universal Music Canada
Reason to Love	Release date: TBA; Label: Chad Brownlee Music Inc.

=== Extended plays ===
Title	Details	Peak positions
Title	Details	CAN
Hearts on Fire	Release date: April 29, 2016; Label: MDM Recordings/Universal Music Canada	48

=== Singles ===
Year	Title	Peak chart positions		Certifications	Album
Year	Title	CAN	CAN Country	Certifications	Album
2009	"The Best That I Can (Superhero)"	—	20		Chad Brownlee
2010	"Hope"	—	47		Chad Brownlee
2010	"Hood of My Car"	96	14		Chad Brownlee
2010	"Day After You"	—	9		Chad Brownlee
2011	"Carried Away"	—	19		Chad Brownlee
2011	"Love Me or Leave Me"	—	8		Love Me or Leave Me
2012	"Smoke in the Rain"	74	8		Love Me or Leave Me
2012	"Listen"	85	9		Love Me or Leave Me
2013	"Crash"	91	10		Love Me or Leave Me
2013	"Where the Party At?"	100	13		The Fighters
2014	"Fallin' Over You"	66	10		The Fighters
2014	"Just Because"	98	11		The Fighters
2014	"When the Lights Go Down"	81	11		The Fighters
2015	"Thinking Out Loud"	—	34		—N/a
2015	"Hearts on Fire"	—	8		Hearts on Fire
2016	"I Hate You for It"	—	8	MC: Gold	Hearts on Fire
2016	"Somethin' We Shouldn't Do"	—	7	MC: Gold	Hearts on Fire
2017	"Might As Well Be Me"	—	14		Hearts on Fire
2017	"Out of the Blue"	—	17		Hearts on Fire
2018	"Dear Drunk Me"	90	3	MC: Platinum	Back in the Game
2019	"Forever's Gotta Start Somewhere"	89	1	MC: Platinum	Back in the Game
2019	"The Way You Roll"	—	3	MC: Gold	Back in the Game
2020	"Money On You"	96	7		Back in the Game
2023	"The Country Kind"	—	—		TBA
2025	"Reason to Love"	—	46		TBA
"—" denotes releases that did not chart

=== Other charted songs ===
Year	Single	Peak chart positions	Album
Year	Single	CAN Country	Album
2012	"Christmas (Baby, Please Come Home)"	37	Non-album single

=== Music videos ===
Year	Video	Director
2010	"Hope"	CMT
2010	"Day After You"	Antonio Hrynchuk
2011	"Carried Away"	Antonio Hrynchuk
2011	"Christmas (Baby Please Come Home)"	Antonio Hrynchuk
2012	"Listen"	Carolyne Stossel
2013	"Crash"	Carolyne Stossel
2013	"Where the Party At?"	
2014	"Fallin' Over You"	Carolyne Stossel
2014	"We Don't Walk This Road Alone"	
2014	"Just Because"	
2014	"When the Lights Go Down"	Joey Boukadakis
2015	"Matches"	Joel Stewart
2015	"Hearts on Fire"	Stephano Barberis
2016	"I Hate You for It"	Stephano Barberis
2016	"Somethin' We Shouldn't Do"	Stephano Barberis
2017	"Might As Well Be Me"	Stephano Barberis
2017	"Out of the Blue"	
2018	"Dear Drunk Me"	Ben Knechtel
2019	"Forever's Gotta Start Somewhere"	Ben Knechtel
2019	"The Way You Roll"	Ben Knechtel

== Awards and nominations ==
Year	Association	Category	Result	Ref
2010	British Columbia Country Music Association	Male Vocalist of the Year	Won	
2010	British Columbia Country Music Association	Songwriter of the Year – "Hood of My Car" (with Mitch Merrett, Kelly Archer)	Won	
2010	Canadian Country Music Association	Rising Star	Nominated	
2011	British Columbia Country Music Association	Album of the Year – Chad Brownlee	Won	
2011	British Columbia Country Music Association	Entertainer of the Year	Won	
2011	British Columbia Country Music Association	Fans Choice Award	Nominated	
2011	British Columbia Country Music Association	Male Vocalist of the Year	Won	
2011	British Columbia Country Music Association	Single of the Year – "The Day After You"	Won	
2011	British Columbia Country Music Association	Video of the Year – "Carried Away"	Won	
2011	Canadian Country Music Association	Rising Star	Won	
2012	Canadian Country Music Association	Male Artist of the Year	Nominated	
2012	Canadian Country Music Association	Interactive Artist of the Year	Nominated	
2012	British Columbia Country Music Association	Entertainer of the Year	Won	
2012	British Columbia Country Music Association	Album of the Year – Love Me or Leave Me	Won	
2012	British Columbia Country Music Association	Single of the Year – "Love Me or Leave Me"	Won	
2012	British Columbia Country Music Association	Fans Choice Award	Won	
2012	British Columbia Country Music Association	Male Vocalist of the Year	Won	
2012	British Columbia Country Music Association	Songwriter of the Year – "Love Me or Leave Me" (with Mitch Merrett, Ben Glover)	Won	
2012	British Columbia Country Music Association	Video of the Year – "Listen"	Nominated	
2013	Juno Awards of 2013	Country Album of the Year – Love Me or Leave Me	Nominated	
2013	Canadian Country Music Association	Male Artist of the Year	Nominated	
2014	British Columbia Country Music Association	Album of the Year – The Fighters	Nominated	
2014	British Columbia Country Music Association	Entertainer of the Year	Nominated	
2014	British Columbia Country Music Association	Fans Choice Award	Nominated	
2014	British Columbia Country Music Association	Male Vocalist of the Year	Nominated	
2014	British Columbia Country Music Association	Single of the Year – "Fallin' Over You"	Nominated	
2014	British Columbia Country Music Association	Songwriter of the Year – "Just Because" (with Mitch Merrett, Brian White & Phil Barton)	Won	
2014	British Columbia Country Music Association	Video of the Year – "Fallin' Over You"	Nominated	
2014	British Columbia Country Music Association	Humanitarian of the Year	Nominated	
2015	British Columbia Country Music Association	Entertainer of the Year	Nominated	
2015	British Columbia Country Music Association	Fans Choice Award	Nominated	
2015	British Columbia Country Music Association	Male Vocalist of the Year	Nominated	
2015	British Columbia Country Music Association	Single of the Year – "When The Lights Go Down"	Nominated	
2015	British Columbia Country Music Association	Songwriter of the Year – "When The Lights Go Down" (with Mitch Merrett, Ben Glover)	Won	
2015	British Columbia Country Music Association	Songwriter of the Year – "Leave Your Lights On" (with Jeff Johnson & Phil Puxley)	Nominated	
2015	British Columbia Country Music Association	Video of the Year – "When The Lights Go Down"	Won	
2015	British Columbia Country Music Association	Humanitarian of the Year	Nominated	
2016	Canadian Country Music Association	Album of the Year – Hearts on Fire	Nominated	
2016	Canadian Country Music Association	CMT Video of the Year – "Hearts on Fire"	Nominated	
2016	British Columbia Country Music Association	Album of the Year – Hearts on Fire	Won	
2016	British Columbia Country Music Association	Male Vocalist of the Year	Won	
2016	British Columbia Country Music Association	Entertainer of the Year	Nominated	
2016	British Columbia Country Music Association	Fans Choice Award	Nominated	
2016	British Columbia Country Music Association	Single of the Year – "I Hate You For It"	Nominated	
2016	British Columbia Country Music Association	Songwriter of the Year	Nominated	
2017	Juno Awards	Country Album of the Year – Hearts on Fire	Nominated	
2017	Canadian Country Music Association	Fans' Choice Award	Nominated	
2017	Canadian Country Music Association	Male Artist of the Year	Nominated	

== Ice hockey career statistics ==
			Regular season					Playoffs
Season	Team	League	GP	G	A	Pts	PIM	GP	G	A	Pts	PIM
2001–02	Vernon Vipers	BCHL	55	6	12	18	62	—	—	—	—	—
2002–03	Vernon Vipers	BCHL	58	8	16	24	63	—	—	—	—	—
2003–04	Minnesota State University, Mankato	WCHA	35	2	1	3	44	—	—	—	—	—
2004–05	Minnesota State University, Mankato	WCHA	36	1	1	2	60	—	—	—	—	—
2005–06	Minnesota State University, Mankato	WCHA	29	1	1	2	47	—	—	—	—	—
2006–07	Minnesota State University, Mankato	WCHA	34	0	4	4	50	—	—	—	—	—
2007–08	Idaho Steelheads	ECHL	35	1	2	3	41	—	—	—	—	—
WCHA totals			134	4	7	11	201	—	—	—	—	—
