= Boots and Hearts Music Festival =

Country music festival in Ontario, Canada

Coordinates: 44.479240°N 79.519172°W

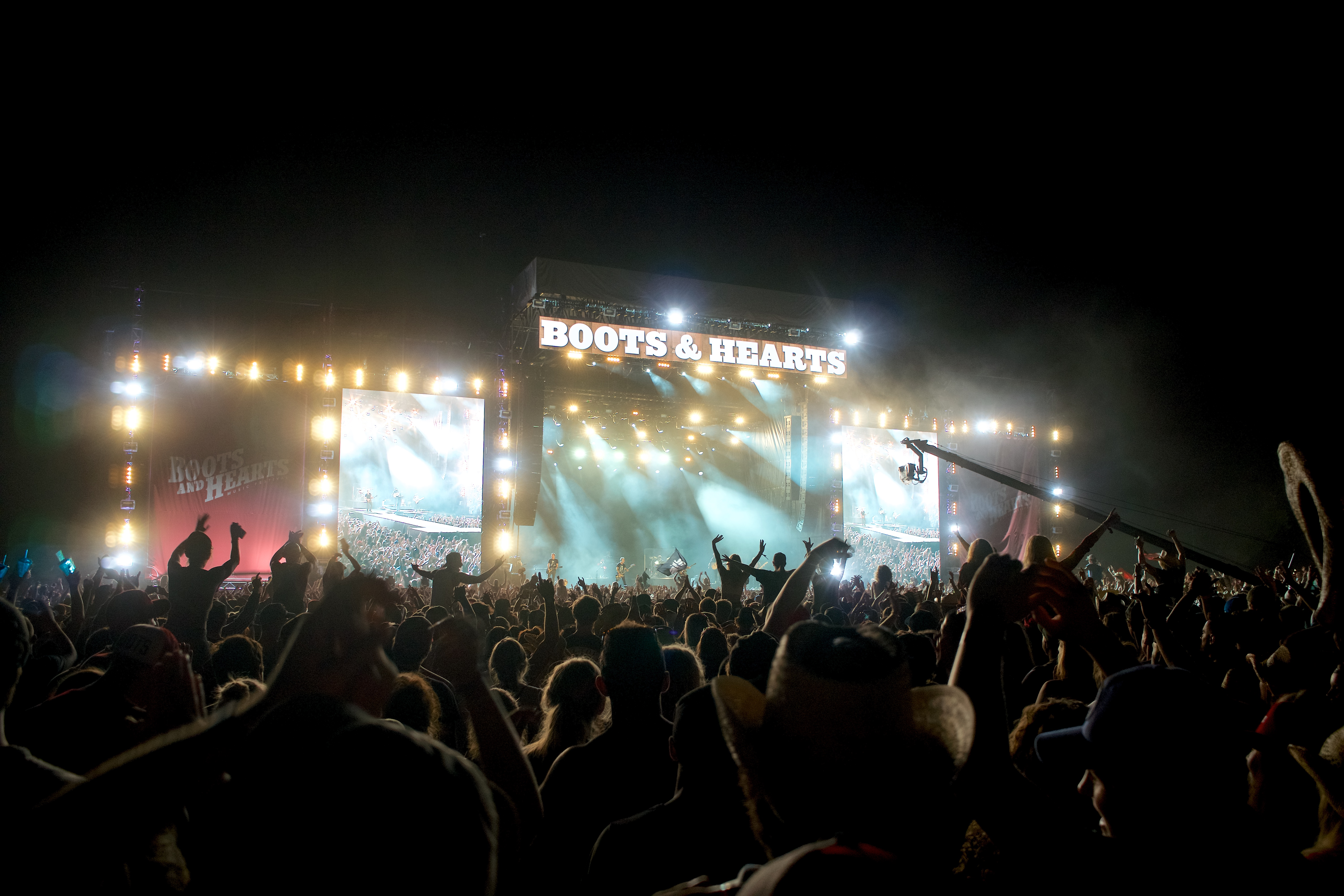
- Boots & Hearts Music Festival Summer 2016
- Genre: Music festival
- Locations: Burl's Creek Event Grounds, Oro-Medonte, Ontario, Canada
- Years active: 2012-19, 2022-
- Founders: Stan and Eva Dunford, Shannon McNevan
- Capacity: 45,000+
- Website: Official website

The Boots and Hearts Music Festival is a multi-day country music and camping festival produced by Republic Live Inc. and owned by Stan and Eva Dunford. The festival is held annually at the Burl's Creek Event Grounds in Oro-Medonte, Ontario, Canada, one hour north of Toronto, and takes place following the August long weekend. Since its inception in 2012, Boots and Hearts has grown to become Canada's largest country music festival and the second largest country music festival in North America behind only the CMA Music Festival.

Boots and Hearts was awarded the CCMA (Canadian Country Music Association) "Festival of the Year" Award in 2014, 2015, and 2016, as well as the Canadian Music Week "Festival of the Year" in 2015. In 2019 and 2020, they were nominated for "Festival of the Year" by the Academy of Country Music Awards.

The 2020 and 2021 editions of the event were cancelled due to the global COVID-19 coronavirus pandemic.

== History ==
Owned by Stan and Eva Dunford, under Republic Live Inc, Boots and Hearts took place for the first time in 2012 at Canadian Tire Motorsport Park in Bowmanville, Ontario based on the vision of Stan's nephew, Shannon McNevan. After reaching capacity at Motorsport Park they then purchased land to host large scale festivals and the festival moved to Burl's Creek Event Grounds in Oro-Medonte, Ontario.

=== Lineups ===
==== August 10–12, 2012 ====
Alabama, Big & Rich, Carrie Underwood, Kid Rock, Lionel Richie, Sheryl Crow, Tim McGraw

Canaan Smith, Charlie Major, Crystal Shawanda, Dallas Smith, Dance Y'all, Danny Michel, Derek Miller, Gord Downie & The Sadies, Hannah Chapplain, High Valley, Jason Jones, Jason McCoy, Jaydee Bixby, JT Hodges, Kevin Costner, Kira Isabella, Larry Berrio, Lauren Alaina, Leah Daniels, Lindsay Broughton, MacKenzie Porter, Makayla Lynn, Martha Meredith, Melissa Payne, Paul Brandt, Phil Vassar, Riot In The Valley, Shane Yellowbird, Stone Sparrows, Tebey, Terri Clark, The Hollowbodies, The Roughnotes, Tim Chaisson, Tim Hicks, Trish Stratus.

==== August 1–4, 2013 ====
Jason Aldean, The Band Perry, Rascal Flatts, Dierks Bentley, Miranda Lambert

MacKenzie Porter, Lindsay Broughton, Rob Carnegie, The Stone Sparrows, Tim Hicks, Emerson Drive, Catfish Willie & The Buckle Busters, Washboard Hank, Keith & Renee, The Heartbroken, Autumn Hill, David Nail, Whitney Rose, The Abrams Brothers, Melissa Payne, Devin Cuddy, Aaron Lewis, Parmalee, Cassadee Pope, Colt Ford, Dean Brody, The Stellas, Kira Isabella, Chad Brownlee, Joe Diffie, Duck Dynasty, Tebey, High Valley, Jason Blaine, Tate Stevens.

==== July 31 - August 3, 2014 ====
Toby Keith, Lee Brice, Luke Bryan, Hunter Hayes, Blake Shelton

Natalie Stovall and the Drive, Brett Kissel, Dallas Smith, The Stables, Alyssa Morrissey, Genevieve Fisher, Marshall Dane, Jordan McIntosh, Jess Moskaluke, Chris Stapleton, Sam Hunt, One More Girl, Deric Ruttan, The Road Hammers, Paul Brandt, Sawyer Brown, David Lee Murphy, Clare Dunn, Tim Hicks, Open Sky, Northern Road, Jordan McIntosh, Abrams Brothers, Dan + Shay, Tyler Farr, The Reklaws, Danielle Bradbery, Home Free, Neal McCoy, Gord Bamford.

==== August 6–9, 2015 ====
Brad Paisley, Eric Church, Florida Georgia Line, Thomas Rhett, Dallas Smith, Justin Moore

Emerson Drive, High Valley, Chad Brownlee, Frankie Ballard, The Road Hammers, David Nail, Maddie & Tae, Canaan Smith, Kira Isabella, The Stellas, Jess Moskaluke, Lennon and Maisy, Austin Webb, Blackjack Billy, Dylan Scott, Old Dominion, Small Town Pistols, MacKenzie Porter, The Reklaws, Wes Mack, Trinity Bradshaw, The Lovelocks, Leah Daniels, MacArthur Clark, Ty Baynton, Kaitlin Kozell, Tham Dang Rattlers, Genevieve Fisher, Melissa Payne, Jesse LaBelle, Open Sky, Kate Suhr, Abby Stewart.

==== August 4–7, 2016 ====
Blake Shelton, Tim McGraw, Dierks Bentley, Jake Owen, Sam Hunt, Chase Rice

Dean Brody, Tim Hicks, Diamond Rio, Emerson Drive, Chase Bryant, Dylan Scott, Jason Blaine, Cam, Alan Doyle and the Beautiful Gypsies, Tebey, Raquel Cole, River Town Saints, Autumn Hill, Meghan Patrick, Madeline Merlo, Lindsay Ell, Jojo Mason, Jason Benoit, Jordan McIntosh, David James, Aaron Pritchett, Lindsay Broughton, The Reklaws, The Dungarees, Cory Marquardt, Kaitlin Kozell, Brea Lawrenson, Johnson Crook, MacArthur Clark, James Barker Band.

==== August 10–13, 2017 ====
Luke Bryan, Keith Urban, Brantley Gilbert

Brett Eldredge, Eli Young Band, Dan + Shay, Frankie Ballard, Chad Brownlee, Jess Moskaluke, Kiefer Sutherland, Tucker Beathard, Drake White and The Big Fire, Aubrie Sellers, Cold Creek County, Endless Summer, Lindi Ortega, Brooke Eden, Midland, JJ Shiplett, The Abrams, Jessica Mitchell, Dani Strong, Kelly Prescot, Andrew Hyatt, Jesse Gold

==== August 9–12, 2018 ====
Florida Georgia Line, Alan Jackson, Thomas Rhett, Billy Currington, Dallas Smith, Brett Young

Midland, Locash, James Barker Band, The Washboard Union, Lindsay Ell, Russell Dickerson, Blackjack Billy, Meghan Patrick, Walker Hayes, Madeline Merlo, Jason Blaine, Aaron Goodvin, River Town Saints, Kira Isabella, Andrew Hyatt, Bobby Wills, Maggie Rose, Runaway June, Chris Buck Band, Petric, Jimmie Allen, Sons of Daughters, Ryan Robinette, Devin Dawson, Natasha Zimbaro, Genevieve Fisher, Sacha, The Wheat Kings, Jade Eagleson, The Redhill Valleys, Kelsi Mayne, Emma Wright

==== August 8–11, 2019 ====
Jason Aldean, Miranda Lambert, Cole Swindell, Maren Morris, Kip Moore, Kane Brown

Chase Rice, Michael Ray, Tim Hicks, Carly Pearce, Mitchell Tenpenny, Lanco, The Cadillac Three, Morgan Wallen, Dylan Scott, Ashley McBryde, Ryan Hurd, RaeLynn, Runaway June, Smithfield, Tyler Rich, Danielle Bradbery, Brandon Lay, The Wild Feathers, Jameson Rodgers, Hardy, Shawn Austin, Levi Hummon, Filmore, Drew Baldridge, MacKenzie Porter, Jake Rose, Eric Ethridge, The Abrams, Tenille Arts, Kris Barclay, Owen Barney, Justin Tyler, David Boyd Janes

==== August 6–9, 2020 ====
- Event cancelled due to COVID-19 coronavirus pandemic

==== August 5–8, 2021 ====
- Event cancelled due to COVID-19 coronavirus pandemic

==== August 4–7, 2022 ====
Shania Twain, Florida Georgia Line, Jake Owen, Lindsay Ell, Russell Dickerson, Dustin Lynch

Tyler Rich, Robyn Ottolini, Niko Moon, Meghan Patrick, Morgan Evans, MacKenzie Porter, Priscilla Block, Andrew Hyatt, Madison Kozak, Five Roses, Brittany Kennell, The Redhill Valleys, Morgan Wade, Steven Lee Olsen, Nate Smith, After Midtown, Sykamore, Kidd G, Jason Blaine, Shy Carter, Don Amero, David Boyd Janes, Jess & Tay, Callista Clark, Riley Taylor

==== August 10–13, 2023 ====
Tim McGraw, Keith Urban, Nickelback, Tim Hicks

Riley Green, Dallas Smith, Hardy, Josh Ross, Travis Denning, Tyler Joe Miller, Danielle Bradbery, Breland, Bailey Zimmerman, Cory Marks, Kylie Morgan, Tim & The Glory Boys, Matt Lang, Blanco Brown, Seaforth, Adam Doleac, Big Wreck, JJ Wilde, Ashland Craft, Owen Riegling, Ya'Boyz, Dan Davidson, Alli Walker, Nice Horse, Devon Cole, Raquel Cole, Graham Scott Fleming, Manny Blu, Teigen Gayse, Parker Graye

==== August 8-11, 2024 ====
Jason Aldean, Thomas Rhett, Cody Johnson

Carly Pearce, Matchbox Twenty, Brothers Osborne, Midland, Nate Smith, Emerson Drive, Needtobreathe, Jackson Dean, Megan Moroney, Chayce Beckham, Lonestar, Madeline Merlo, Alana Springsteen, Alexandra Kay, Hunter Brothers, Bryan Martin, Lauren Watkins, Jess Moskaluke, Redferrin, Nate Haller, Shantaia, Dillon James, Dayna Reid, Brian John Harwood, Alee, Texas King, Elyse Saunders, Kalsey Kulyk, Buck Twenty, Taylor-Rae

==== August 7-10, 2025 ====
Hardy, Sam Hunt, Bailey Zimmerman, Justin Moore

Koe Wetzel, Chase Rice, Tyler Hubbard, Daughtry, Meghan Patrick, High Valley, Owen Riegling, Cameron Whitcomb, Dylan Marlowe, Tyler Joe Miller, Stephen Wilson Jr., Default, Andrew Hyatt, The Band Perry, Noeline Hofmann, Kolby Cooper, Austin Snell, Hannah McFarland, Mackenzie Carpenter, Sarah Vanderzon, Lakeview, Hailey Benedict, Sacha, Sully Burrows, Jessie T, Karli June, Kelsi Mayne, Zach McPhee, Lowell Lawson, Allison Daniels, Vavo, Down with Webster

==== August 7-9, 2026 ====
Jonas Brothers, Rascal Flatts, The Chicks, Tucker Wetmore, Jessie Murph, Russell Dickerson

Max McNown, James Barker Band, Ashley Cooke, Sam Barber, Waylon Wyatt, Carolyn Dawn Johnson, Brett Kissel, Dasha, Kaitlin Butts, Mitch Zorn, Savannah Jade, Thelma & James, Tony Stevens, The Jack Wharff Band, Emily Ann Roberts, School House

== See also ==
- List of country music festivals
- List of folk festivals
