= Wide Mouth Mason discography =

Band discography

- Studio albums: 7
- Live albums: 1
- Compilation albums: 2
- Singles: 19

This is the discography of the Canadian rock band Wide Mouth Mason.

== Studio albums ==
| Year | Details | Peak chart positions | Certifications | Tracks |
| Year | Details | CAN | | Tracks |
|---|---|---|---|---|
| 1996 | The Nazarene: Released: May 28, 1996; Label: Independent | - | | Track listing: "My Old Self"; "Midnight Rain"; "All It Amounts To"; "Corn Rows"; "Mary Mary"; "The Preacher Man"; "The Game"; "Sister Sally"; "Tell Me"; "Black Pepper Joe"; "Tom Robinson"; "River Song" (hidden track) |
| 1997 | Wide Mouth Mason: Released: March 25, 1997; Label: Warner Music Canada | 90 | MC: Gold | Track listing: "My Old Self"; "Midnight Rain"; "Tom Robinson"; "The River Song"; "This Mourning"; "The Preacherman's Song"; "The Game"; "All It Amounts To"; "Corn Rows"; "Sister Sally"; "Tell Me"; "Mary Mary"; "My Old Self" (live) (Japanese release) |
| 1999 | Where I Started: Released: March 9, 1999; Label: Warner Music Canada | 44 | MC: Gold | Track listing: "Why"; "Alone"; "Burn"; "Companion (Lay Me Down)"; "Half A Chance"; "Empty Seat"; "Crystal Ball"; "King of Poison"; "Sugarcane"; "Where I Started"; "Old"; "Falling Down" |
| 2000 | Stew: Released: July 25, 2000; Label: Warner Music Canada | 29 | | Track listing: "Who's There?"; "She's Alone"; "Once You Got It"; "Smile"; "Bushi Su"; "Change"; "Watchewan"; "Mad Doctor"; "Exquisite (It's Late)"; "Sleepwalker"; "Breathe Out"; "Ease Your Mind"; "Fa Na Na" |
| 2002 | Rained Out Parade: Released: August 27, 2002; Label: Warner Music Canada | 54 | | Track listing: "Bootleggin'"; "My New Self"; "Lagavulin"; "Rained Out Parade"; "Reconsider"; "Puppet in a Clown Show"; "Come Out To Go"; "O."; "Dry You Up"; "Alright, Alright"; "Always, Never, Only"; "My Imagination"; "Scratch"; "40 Watt Moon" |
| 2005 | Shot Down Satellites: Released: August 30, 2005; Label: Curve | - | | Track listing: "I Love Not Loving You"; "Unfolding"; "Everybody's Right"; "Really Wrong"; "Phantom Limb"; "Shot Down Satellites"; "Worse Than Before"; "Rust"; "Moment That You Came"; "Wide Eyed"; "Eleven"; "Please Go Home"; "It's So Bad" |
| 2011 | No Bad Days: Released: July 12, 2011; Label: Bread and Water | - | | Track listing: "More of It"; "Get a Hold of You"; "Go Tell It to the Waterfall"; "Only a Secret if You Keep It"; "Drive"; "Shut Up and Kiss Me"; "Sweet Little Thing"; "Only the Young Die Good"; "Burn It Down"; "Listen Sister"; "What'd I Do"; "The Night Fell" |
| 2023 | Late Night Walking: Released: September 8, 2023; Label: We Are Busy Bodies | - | | Track listing: "Habitual"; "Obvious"; "Long Distance Love"; "Other Side of Tonight"; "You Pushed Me"; "Minus Two Minutes"; "Unshoot a Gun"; "My Old Mistakes"; "Cold Tea"; "Raw Deal" |

== Live albums ==
| Year | Details | Peak chart positions | Certifications | Tracks |
| Year | Details | CAN | | Tracks |
|---|---|---|---|---|
| 2009 | Live! Montreux, Switzerland: Released: November 10, 2009; CD + DVD | - | | Track listing: "Indecision"; "Tom Robinson"; "Castles Made of Sand"; "Corn Rows"; "Midnight Rain"; "Tell Me"; "Sister Sally"; "Why"; "Oh Mother"; "Companion"; "This Mourning"; "Mary Mary" |

== Compilation albums ==
| Year | Details | Peak chart positions | Certifications | Tracks |
| Year | Details | CAN | | Tracks |
|---|---|---|---|---|
| 2002 | Greatest Hits: Released: December, 2002; China only release | - | | Track listing: "Change" (remix); "Smile"; "Companion"; "My Imagination"; "Bushi Su"; "Why"; "This Mourning"; "Rained Out Parade"; "All It Amounts To"; "Half a Chance"; "Ease Your Mind"; "Billie Jean" (bonus track) |
| 2005 | The Essentials: Released: August 30, 2005; Label: Warner Music Canada | - | | Track listing: "Midnight Rain"; "Change"; "My Old Self"; "Reconsider"; "The River Song"; "Why"; "Half a Chance"; "This Mourning"; "Sugarcane"; "Smile"; "Rained Out Parade"; "Ease Your Mind" |

== Singles ==
| Year | Title | Peak chart positions | | Album |
| Year | Title | CAN | CAN Rock/Alt. | Album |
|---|---|---|---|---|
| 1997 | "Midnight Rain" | 7 | - | Wide Mouth Mason |
| 1997 | "My Old Self" | - | 11 | Wide Mouth Mason |
| 1997 | "This Mourning" | 26 | 43 | Wide Mouth Mason |
| 1998 | "The Game" | 39 | - | Wide Mouth Mason |
| 1999 | "Why" | 15 | 5 | Where I Started |
| 1999 | "Companion (Lay Me Down)" | 51 | 8 | Where I Started |
| 1999 | "Sugarcane" | 51 | 12 | Where I Started |
| 2000 | "Half a Chance" | - | 16 | Where I Started |
| 2000 | "Smile" | - | 3 | Stew |
| 2000 | "Change" | 36 | - | Stew |
| 2000 | "Ease Your Mind" | - | - | Stew |
| 2002 | "Rained Out Parade" | - | - | Rained Out Parade |
| 2002 | "Reconsider" | - | - | Rained Out Parade |
| 2003 | "Bootleggin" | - | - | Rained Out Parade |
| 2005 | "I Love Not Loving You" | - | - | Shot Down Satellites |
| 2006 | "Phantom Limb" | - | - | Shot Down Satellites |
| 2011 | "When I Fell For You" | - | - | Non-album singles |
| 2020 | "Who Do You Get Your Love From" | - | - | Non-album singles |
| 2018 | "Christmas Wish List" | - | - | Non-album singles |
| 2023 | "You Pushed Me" | - | - | Late Night Walking |
| 2023 | "My Own Mistakes" | - | - | Late Night Walking |
| 2023 | "Other Side of Tonight" | - | - | Late Night Walking |
