= Hailey Benedict =

Canadian country singer and songwriter (2002-)

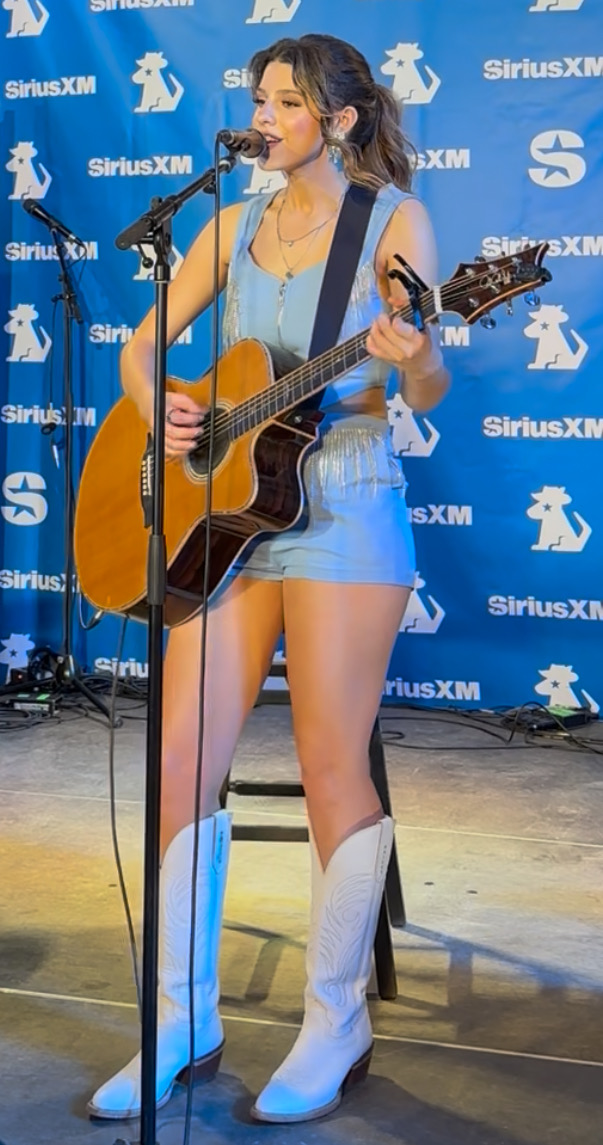
- Benedict performing in Oro-Medonte, Ontario, at the Boots and Hearts Music Festival in 2025

Background information
- Born: May 10, 2002 (age 24)
- Origin: St. Albert, Alberta, Canada
- Genre: Country
- Occupations: Singer, songwriter
- Instruments: Guitar, vocals
- Years active: 2014-present
- Labels: Big Loud; Local Hay; Mercury; Republic; Sakamoto
- Website: Official website

Hailey Benedict (born May 10, 2002) is a Canadian country music singer and songwriter from St. Albert, Alberta. She is currently signed to Big Loud Records and its imprint Local Hay. She has charted on Canada Country with the singles "Wanted You To", "Damn You July", and "Things My Mama Says".

== Biography ==
=== Early life ===
Benedict has been performing since she was just six years old. In 2014, she won Country Music Alberta's Fan's Choice award, and was also named the winner of the youth Junior Talent Search at the Big Valley Jamboree. In 2016, Benedict and her sister were invited on stage by Keith Urban during a concert at Rogers Place in Edmonton, Alberta. After telling Urban that she wanted to be a singer-songwriter, he allowed her to perform one of her original songs, "Clean Slate", for the crowd. In 2017, Benedict was named the Grand Winner of Big Valley Jamboree's 2017 ATB Homegrown Talent Stage, and was also named a recipient of the Global Women of Vision award. She graduated from Paul Kane High School in St. Albert in 2020.

=== 2021-present ===
In August 2021, Benedict independently released her debut Canadian radio single "Wanted You To", which later reached a peak of number 25 on the Canadian country airplay chart. She subsequently signed a management deal with GPS Artist Management in July 2022. Later that year, Benedict won "Interactive Artist of the Year" at the 2022 Canadian Country Music Awards. In early 2023, Benedict supported Aaron Goodvin as an opening act on his "It's the Ride Tour" across Canada. In June 2023, she released the single "Damn You July" through the label Sakamoto Music. In September 2023, Benedict won the SiriusXM Top of the Country competition. In December 2023, she released her first Christmas single, "Freeze".

In September 2024, Benedict signed a record deal and a publishing deal with Big Loud and Local Hay. That same month, she was nominated for "Breakthrough Artist or Group of the Year" at the 2024 Canadian Country Music Awards. In October 2024, Benedict released the single "Things My Mama Says". The song later became Benedict's first top ten hit on the Billboard Canada Country chart. She was nominated for Female Artist of the Year at the 2025 Canadian Country Music Association Awards.

== Discography ==
=== Singles ===
Title	Year	Peak chart positions	Album
Title	Year	CAN Country	Album
"Wanted You To"	2021	25	Non-album singles
"Damn You July"	2023	49	Non-album singles
"Things My Mama Says"	2024	6	Non-album singles
"Carl Dean"	2025	56	Non-album singles
"Party Without You"	2026	33	Non-album singles

=== Christmas singles ===
Title	Year	Peak chart positions	Album
Title	Year	CAN Country	Album
"Freeze"	2023	44	Non-album single

=== Music videos ===
Title	Year	Director
"Wanted You To"	2021	Bryton Udy
"Level Up"	2022	Not listed
"Freeze"	2023	Codi McIvor

== Awards and nominations ==
Year	Award	Category	Nominated work	Result	Ref
2014	Country Music Alberta	Fans' Choice	—N/a	Won	
2019	Country Music Alberta	Horizon Youth Award	—N/a	Won	
2022	Canadian Country Music Association	Interactive Artist or Group of the Year	—N/a	Won	
2022	Canadian Country Music Association	Rising Star	—N/a	Nominated	
2022	Country Music Alberta	Horizon Female Artist of the Year	—N/a	Won	
2022	Country Music Alberta	Horizon Single of the Year	"Wanted You To"	Won	
2022	Western Canadian Music Awards	Country Artist of the Year	—N/a	Nominated	
2023	Country Music Alberta	Interactive Artist of the Year	—N/a	Won	
2023	Country Music Alberta	Songwriter(s) of the Year	"Level Up"	Won	
2023	Country Music Alberta	Video of the Year	"Wanted You To"	Won	
2024	Canadian Country Music Association	Breakthrough Artist or Group of the Year	—N/a	Nominated	
2024	Country Music Alberta	Horizon Female Artist of the Year	—N/a	Won	
2024	Country Music Alberta	Interactive Artist of the Year	—N/a	Won	
2024	Country Music Alberta	Single of the Year	"Damn You July"	Won	
2025	Country Music Alberta	Single of the Year	"Things My Mama Says"	Won	
2025	Canadian Country Music Association	Female Artist of the Year	—N/a	Nominated	
