= Jason Jones =

Jason Jones may refer to:

== Sports ==
- Jason Jones (baseball) (born 1976), American baseball outfielder
- Jason Jones (wide receiver) (born 1983), gridiron football wide receiver
- Jason Jones (defensive end) (born 1986), National Football League player

== Music ==
- Jason Jones (musician) (born 1978), former lead singer of the band Drowning Pool
- Jason Jones (country singer) (born 1994), country music artist
- Jason Jones (The Voice singer)

== Other ==
- Jason Jones (actor), Canadian-American actor and comedian
- Jason Jones (activist) (born 1964), Trinidadian activist
- Jason Jones (activist/filmmaker) (born 1971), American film producer and anti-abortion activist
- Jason Jones (programmer) (born 1971), computer game programmer, co-founder of Bungie
- Jason Jones, suspected of an association with the murder of Jim Kitterman, another American in Baghdad
- Jason Jones, bouncer, convicted of murder of Nisha Patel-Nasri in 2006
