= Small Leaks Sink Ships =

American indie rock band

- Origin: Phoenix, Arizona, Arizona
- Genres: indie rock, post-rock, Electric
- Members: London VanRooy; Judd Hancock; Jim Mandel; Ryan Garner
- Website: www.smallleaks.com

Small Leaks Sink Ships is an American indie rock band formed in 2006 in Phoenix, Arizona. It is known or its electric musical style and poetic lyrics.

== History ==
Small Leaks Sink Ships was founded by London VanRooy, Judd Hancock, Ryan Garner and Jim Mandel. The band released its debut album, Until the World Is Happy: Wake Up You Sleepy Head Sun in 2006, blending indie rock, post-rock and experimental rock. Reviewing it for AllMusic, Stewart Mason described it as a "rather frustrating album . . . the overall feel is that of a modern indie rock version of Abacab-era Genesis: fairly appealing pop songs dressed up with prog rock fripperies that end up making it all sound kind of pretentious." Small Leaks Sink Ships continued to refine their style with subsequent releases including Oak Street Basement (2011) and Face Yourself and Remove Your Sandals. (2015)

In 2017, the band released a new album, Golden Calf. According to reviews, this album marked an evolution in the band's sound, incorporating intricate arrangements, ambient textures and introspective lyrics as well as a new found art pop structure.

== Musical style and influence ==
Small Leaks Sink Ships' sound is characterized by intricate guitar work and dynamic emotive vocals. The bands music often explores themes of self-discovery, introspection and the complexities of human emotions.

The bands musical influences diverse, ranging from post-rock pioneers like Godspeed and Mogwai to indie rock acts as Modest Mouse and now leaning into more modern sounds such as Young Fathers and Alan Rayman.

== Discography ==
- 2007: Until the World is Happy; Wake Up You Sleepyhead Sun
- 2011: Oak Street Basement
- 2014: Living Room Sessions
- 2015: Face Yourself and Remove Your Sandals
- 2017: Golden Calf
- 2018: "Polaroid People" (EP)
- 2023: Low Tide

== Members ==
- London VanRooy – drums, vocals, synth
- Ryan Garner – guitar, piano
- Judd Hancock – vocals, guitar, piano
- Jim Mandel, Jr. – bass

== See also ==
- Experimental rock
- List of indie rock bands
- Post-rock music
