= Flannel Jimmy =

Canadian rock band

- Origin: Nanaimo, British Columbia, Canada
- Years active: 1998–2004
- Labels: Nettwerk
- Past members: Andrew Babuin; Alex Maher; Alex Escott; Ryan Stewart; Mario Vaira

Flannel Jimmy were a Canadian rock band who originated in Nanaimo and Vancouver, British Columbia. They signed to Nettwerk Records in the early 2000s and toured Canada to support their debut album, which was produced by Allan Rodger.

== History ==
Frontman and lead singer–guitarist Andrew Babuin started the band in 1998 in his hometown of Nanaimo, along with saxophonist Alex Maher. When Babuin moved to Vancouver to study forestry. at the University of British Columbia, he met bassist Alex Escott and drummer Ryan Stewart, who were then added to the lineup. Soon after, guitarist Mario Vaira, who was from Nanaimo and had played in high school jazz bands with Maher, completed the quintet. They released their self-titled album in 2001. The band opened for Wide Mouth Mason and Colin James, and for The Proclaimers on their Canadian tour. They played Canadian Music Week in Toronto in 2002.

Their influences include the Dave Matthews Band, Paul Simon, and Spirit of the West.

Alex Maher and Mario Vaira went on to form the band DNA6, in 2004.
