= Where I Started =

Studio album by Wide Mouth Mason
- Released: March 9, 1999
- Recorded: Greenhouse Studios, Vancouver, B.C.
- Genre: Rock, blues rock
- Length: 47:25
- Label: Warner Music Canada
- Producer: David Leonard

Wide Mouth Mason chronology
| Wide Mouth Mason (1997) | Where I Started (1999) | Stew (2000) |

Professional ratings
Review scores
| Source | Rating |
|---|---|
| Allmusic | 3.5/5 stars |
| Medicine Hat News | 5/5 stars |

Where I Started is the third studio album by Canadian rock band Wide Mouth Mason. The album produced four successful singles, "Why", "Companion (Lay Me Down)", "Sugarcane", and "Half A Chance". The album won the award for "Outstanding Rock Recording" at the 1999 Prairie Music Awards. The album was certified Gold in Canada in December 2002. A live version of the song "King Of Poison" was featured on MuchMusic's live compilation album, Much at Edgefest '99.

== Track listing ==
1. Why - 2:57
2. Alone - 3:01
3. Burn - 4:48
4. Companion (Lay Me Down) - 3:01
5. Half A Chance - 4:06
6. Empty Seat - 4:06
7. Crystal Ball - 4:03
8. King Of Poison - 3:20
9. Sugarcane - 4:25
10. Where I Started - 5:07
11. Old - 3:46
12. Falling Down - 4:45
