= Much at Edgefest '99 =

Compilation album by Various artists
- Released: June 1999
- Length: 72:08
- Label: MCA/Universal

"Much @ Edgefest '99" is a compilation album distributed by MuchMusic, promoting the 1999 Edgefest touring rock festival. The album consists primarily of previously unreleased recordings (remixes, live versions, B-sides, etc.) by the bands that toured with Edgefest that year. The album peaked at #8 on the RPM Canadian Albums Chart and was certified Gold by the CRIA in 2000.

== Track listing ==
1. Hole - Best Sunday Dress - 4:24
2. Silverchair - Freak - 3:47
3. Age of Electric - Remote Control - 3:40
4. Creed - My Own Prison (Acoustic Version) - 4:37
5. Moist - Morphine - 5:34
6. Sloan - Glad to Be Here - 2:51
7. Treble Charger - Scatterbrain (Concentrated Mix) - 3:56
8. Big Wreck - Ill Advice - 4:04
9. Collective Soul - Shine - 5:06
10. Matthew Good Band - Fated - 3:04
11. The Watchmen - I'm Blind - 4:46
12. Wide Mouth Mason - King of Poison (Live) - 3:42
13. Blur - Girls & Boys - 4:50
14. Rascalz - The Man That I Am - 3:30
15. Elastica - Connection - 2:20
16. Holly McNarland - The Box (Live) - 4:04
17. The Tea Party - Life Line - 4:35
18. Econoline Crush - Surefire (Never Enough) Fahrenheit 451 Remix - 3:18
