= WayHome Music & Arts Festival =

Former event in Oro-Medonte, Ontario, Canada

Coordinates: 44.479240°N 79.519172°W

WayHome Music & Arts
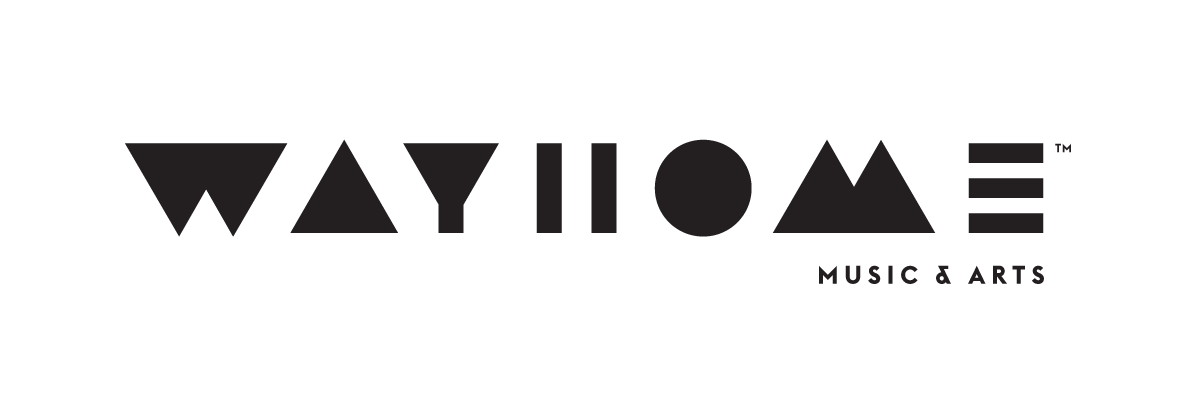
- Genre: Music festival
- Locations: Burl's Creek Event Grounds, Oro-Medonte, Ontario
- Years active: 2015–2017
- Website: wayhome.com

WayHome Music and Arts was a music and arts festival held at Burl's Creek Event Grounds in Oro-Medonte, Ontario, Canada. The festival was held in 2015, 2016, and 2017.

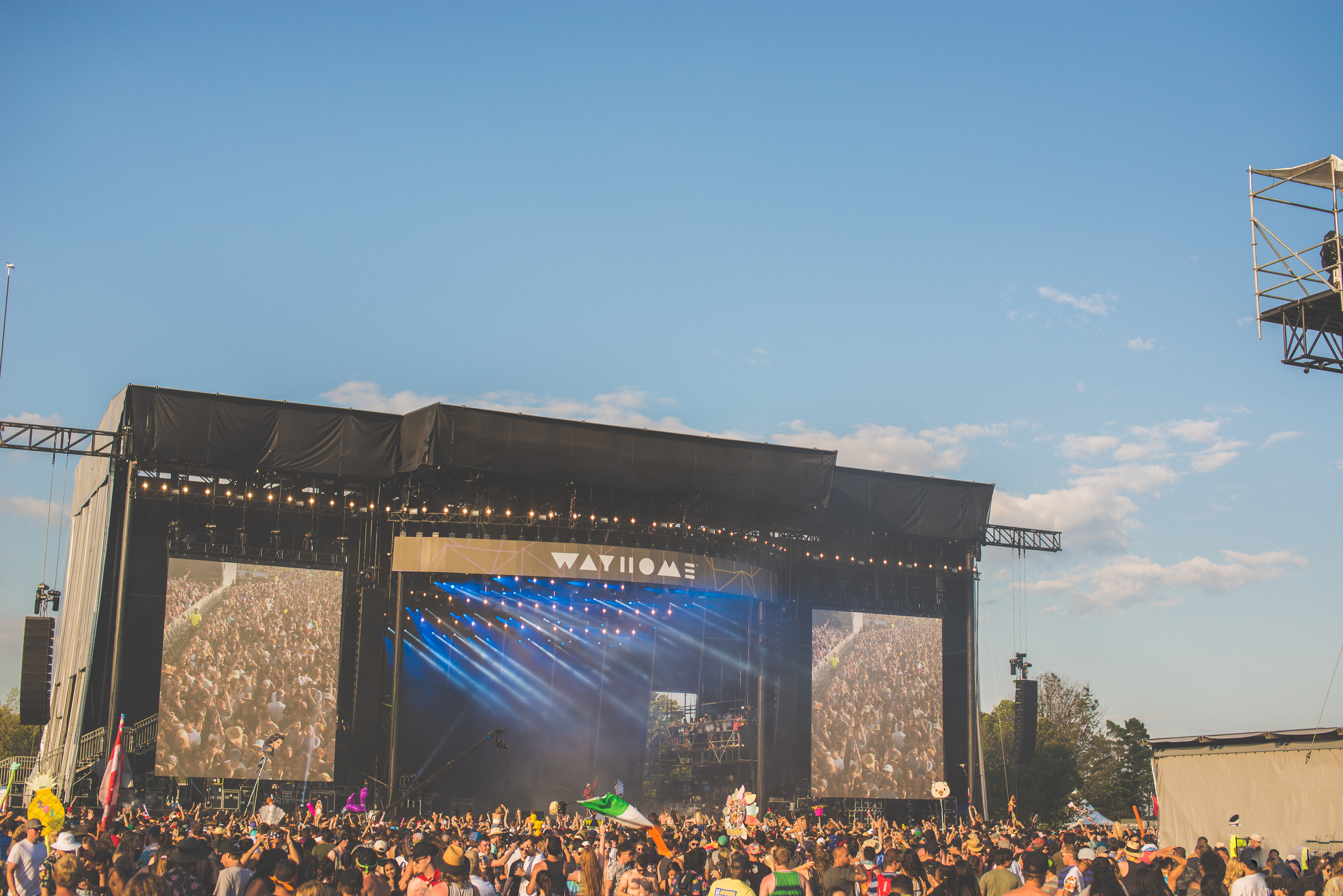
Wayhome 2017

== 2015 line-up ==
=== July 24 ===
Neil Young, Alt-J, Hozier, The Decemberists, Girl Talk, Future Islands, The Gaslight Anthem, Hey Rosetta!, G-Eazy, Courtney Barnett, Fucked Up, Thousand Foot Krutch, Delta Spirit, Rhiannon Giddens, Lukas Nelson & Promise of the Real, Viet Cong, Com Truise, Dwayne Gretzky, Slow Magic, Bear Mountain, Lowell, For Esmé, Saxsyndrum, The Huaraches, Cross Dog, MacArthur Clark

=== July 25 ===
Kendrick Lamar, Modest Mouse, Bassnectar, Run the Jewels, ODESZA, Sylvan Esso, Danny Brown, Manchester Orchestra, The Rural Alberta Advantage, Big K.R.I.T., Timber Timbre, The Lone Bellow, Django Django, The Growlers, METZ, Alvvays, How to Dress Well, SZA, Broncho, The Highest Order, Dear Rouge, Kevin Garrett, The Beaches, Tomi Swick, Teen Violence, Broken Social Scene (replaced Passion Pit, due to illness)

=== July 26 ===
Sam Smith, Brandon Flowers, St. Vincent, Vance Joy, The Sheepdogs, Walk the Moon, Kaytranada, Cold War Kids, July Talk, Yukon Blonde, Sloan, Broods, Chad VanGaalen, Evening Hymns, Highs, Brave Shores, Weaves, The Ascot Royals, Zorch, Amos the Transparent, Lost Cousins

== 2016 line-up ==
=== July 22 ===
Headliner: LCD Soundsystem

Metric, CHVRCHES, Gary Clark, Jr., Mac DeMarco, Rae Sremmurd, Wolf Parade, Foals, Nathaniel Rateliff & The Night Sweats, Matt and Kim, Tory Lanez, Keys N Krates, AlunaGeorge, Unknown Mortal Orchestra, The Struts, Femi Kuti & The Positive Force, Shad, FIDLAR (cancelled due to illness), Tourist, Marian Hill, Bombino, LANY, White Lung, BRAIDS, River Tiber, Tennyson.

=== July 23 ===
Headliner: Arcade Fire

Major Lazer, M83, FKA twigs, Chet Faker, Arkells, The Last Shadow Puppets, Kurt Vile & The Violators, Third Eye Blind, X Ambassadors, Bahamas, A Tribe Called Red, Half Moon Run, Phosphorescent, BADBADNOTGOOD, Patrick Watson, Vince Staples, Savages, GoldLink (cancelled due to "logistical issues"), Lindsey Stirling, Noah Gundersen, Banners, Young Empires, Mothers, Little Scream, Boom Forest.

=== July 24 ===
Headliner: The Killers.

HAIM, Ray LaMontagne, Beirut, Stars, The Arcs, Glass Animals, BØRNS, MØ, Lucius, Oh Wonder, Robert DeLong, Coleman Hell, White Denim, Black Mountain, Dilly Dally, All Them Witches, Bishop Briggs, The Paper Kites, Allie X.

== 2017 line-up ==
Friday, July 28

WayHome	WayBright	WayAway
Flume; Cage The Elephant; Phantogram; Dashboard Confessional; San Fermin; Noname; Belle Game	Justice; The Shins; Foster The People; Constantines; The Naked and Famous; Allan Rayman; Picture This; Grace Mitchell	Danny Brown; Illenium; Poliça; Tanya Tagaq; Andy Shauf; Pat Lok; Margaret Glaspy; Haerts; Gabrielle Shonk

Saturday, July 29

WayHome	WayBright	WayAway
Imagine Dragons; Vance Joy; Schoolboy Q; Death From Above 1979; Jahkoy; NOBRO	Marshmello; Solange; Jazz Cartier; Royal Blood; Honne; Darcys; Charlotte Cardin	Russ; Mura Masa; Pup; Louis the Child; Houndmouth; THEY.; MAGIC GIANT; Blossoms; Flakes

Sunday, July 30

WayHome	WayBright	WayAway
Frank Ocean; Porter Robinson; Banks; Mutemath; The Drums; Skott	Tegan and Sara; Charles Bradley & His Extraordinaires; Mitski; Jagwar Ma; The Dirty Nil; Colony House; Clairmont the Second	Car Seat Headrest; Daniel Caesar; Hundred Waters; Rag'n'Bone Man; Harrison Brome; Begonia

== See also ==
- List of festivals in Ontario
