= Burl's Creek Event Grounds =

Outdoor event venue in Ontario, Canada

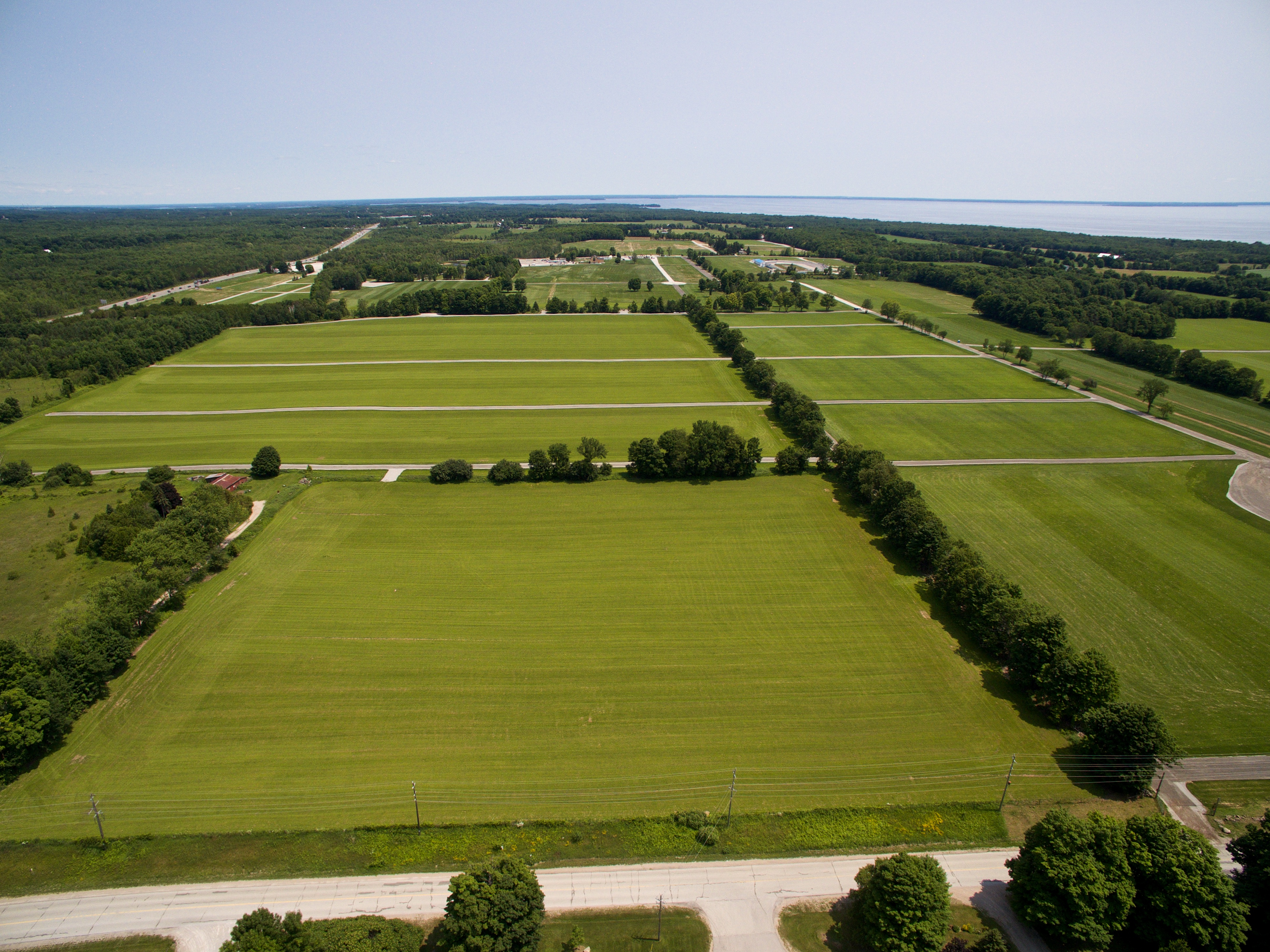
- View of the site in 2015

- Location of Oro-Medonte, Ontario
- Address: 180 Line 8 South
- Location: Oro-Medonte, Ontario, Canada
- Coordinates: 44.479240°N 79.519172°W
- Owner: Stan Dunford
- Capacity: 100,000
- Type: Open-air
- Events: Country music, alternative music, arts & entertainment
- Record attendance: 71,000 (Canada Rocks, 2019)
- Acreage: 585

Construction
- Opened: 1985

Website
- burlscreek.com

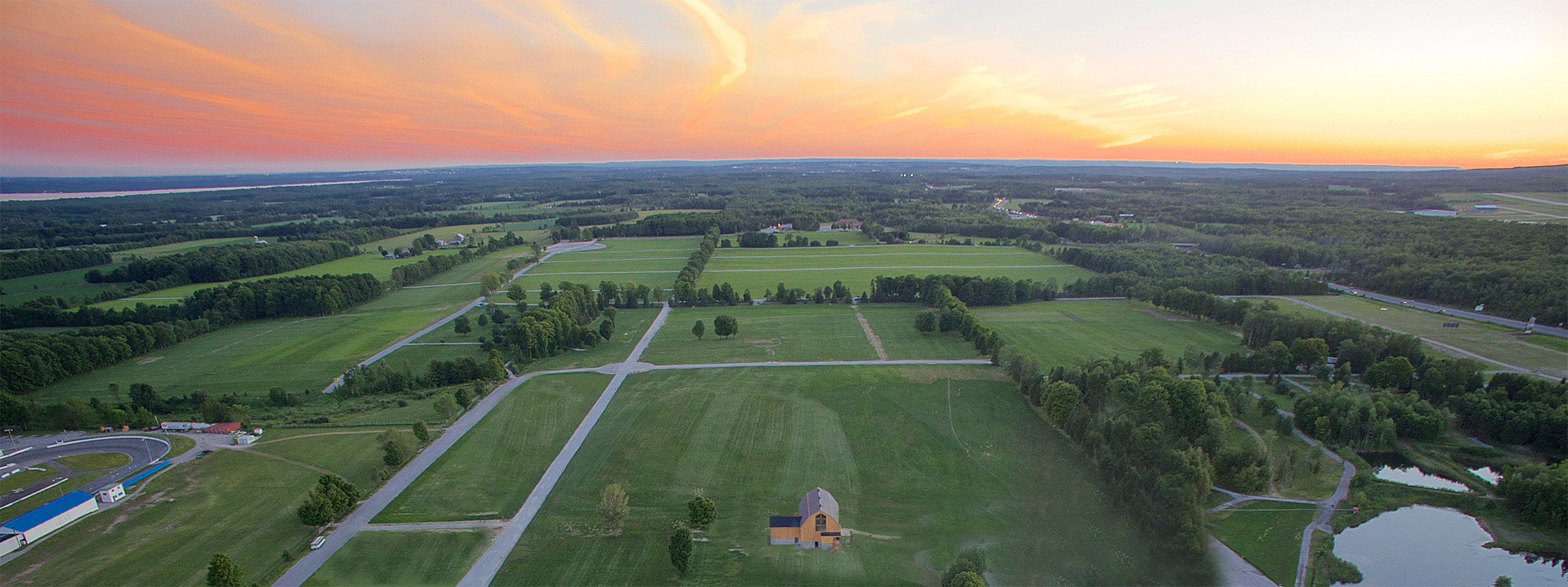
Burl's Creek Event Grounds in 2015

Burl's Creek Event Grounds is a large-scale outdoor music venue in Oro-Medonte township, north of Barrie, Ontario, Canada. It is located on the south side of Highway 11 on Oro-Medonte's 8th Line, between Barrie and Orillia. It most notably holds the Boots and Hearts Music Festival in August each summer, and the Barrie Automotive Flea Market each June and September.

== Description ==
Spanning over 600 acres (240 ha), Burl's Creek Event Grounds is the largest outdoor event venue in Canada. It can host more than 100,000 people and park 33,000 cars. Operating as an event park since 1984, Burl's Creek changed ownership in 2014. Subsequent site alterations and landscaping developed three natural turf amphitheatres for concert viewing. A 1930s-era timber-framed barn was retrofitted into a centrepiece. Cat 5 Fibre cable was installed throughout the grounds, which are serviced by an independent cellular system. In addition to the Cat 5, the event grounds owns 1,200 garbage cans, 225 portable toilets, 45 picnic tables, and 3 shower trailers. Burl's Creek also offers camping on unzoned lands in conjunction with festivals. Celebrity TV personality Todd Jenereaux has assumed the position of EVP of Burl's Creek since 2017.

Burl's Creek is located just east of Ontario Highway 11 between Oro-Medonte Line 8 and Oro-Medonte Line 7, north of Barrie. The grounds are accessed via three separate concession roads with connection to two Highway 11 interchanges, and Ridge Road, which runs from Barrie to Orillia. The venue is one hour from the Greater Toronto Area, 45 minutes to Muskoka, and under 15 minutes to Barrie or Orillia. Simcoe North Regional Airport is nearby.

Burl's Creek owners purchased the legendary Barrie Speedway which sat adjacent to Burl's Creek property on Line 8 in Oro Medonte for decades. The Speedway was purchased in 2015 and demolished to make way for additional parking and camping lands for future music festivals. Prior to the closure of Barrie Speedway Burl's Creek held a private race with a number of local celebrities in attendance, most notably Joe Pileggi who came in second place while driving a police car.

After Burl's Creek received full zoning of their lands in 2018, Burl's Creek issued a number of sanctions towards The Township of Oro Medonte and several township staff and council members. These sanctions were in response to numerous fines and penalties the township issued to Burl's Creek from 2015-2016. In addition to these sanctions a half a dozen mandates were also implemented by Burl's Creek towards all neighbouring properties that surround the event grounds. These mandates were implemented to prevent local townspeople from using the event grounds lands for personal use on foot or utility vehicles.

== Events ==
The grounds have been home to the WayHome Music & Arts Festival, the Boots and Hearts Music Festival, the OK Friday Farmer's Market, The Big Feastival Canada, the Huronia Fur and Feathers Swap Sale, and the long-running spring and fall Barrie automotive flea markets. In 2019, it hosted the "Canada Rocks" Festival which was headlined by The Rolling Stones.

=== WayHome Music & Arts Festival - 2015–2017 ===
The WayHome Music & Arts Festival is a three-day music and arts camping festival produced by Republic Live and held in Oro-Medonte, Ontario, at Burl's Creek Event Grounds between Barrie and Orillia. Owned by Stan and Eva Dunford, WayHome Music & Arts was first held in July, 2015 with an announced 35,000 attendees.

In its inaugural year, WayHome featured headliners Neil Young, Sam Smith, Kendrick Lamar, along with Alt-J, Modest Mouse, Hozier and many more. In its second year, WayHome Music and Arts 2016 featured LCD Soundsystem, Arcade Fire and The Killers, in addition to performances by Major Lazer, M83, Haim, Metric, Chvrches, Ray LaMontagne, and 60+ more artists. The festival offers multiple stages, a variety of late-night spectacles and experiences, international and local cuisine, an on-site locally produced farmers' market, original art installations - past artists include internally acclaimed artist such as; DoLab and Angus Watt, and more to 40,000+ fans over the course of the weekend. WayHome Music and Arts was recently awarded the New Kid on the Block (Best New Festival) award and was nominated for Major Festival of the Year at the 2016 Canadian Music Awards. WayHome Music & Arts 2017 took place from July 28–30, 2017. It featured Imagine Dragons, Frank Ocean, Flume, Justice, Solange, Marshmello, Vance Joy, Schoolboy Q, Tegan and Sara, The Shins and others.

=== Boots and Hearts Music Festival ===
2015–present

The Boots and Hearts Music Festival is Canada's largest multi-day country music and camping festival produced by Republic Live Inc. and owned by Stan and Eva Dunford. It is held annually at the Burl's Creek Event Grounds. Since its inception in 2012, Boots and Hearts has become Canada's largest country music festival and considered the second-largest music festival in North America behind only the CMA Music Festival. The festival offers Emerging Artist Showcase, multiple stages, meet and greets, VIP offers, and is attended by 45,000+ festival-goers over the course of four days. Boots and Hearts was awarded the CCMA (Canadian Country Music Association) "Festival of the Year" Award in 2014, 2015, and 2016, as well as the Canadian Music Week "Festival of the Year" in 2015, with repeat nominations in 2016, 2017, and 2018. Boots and Hearts has seen the acts of world-renowned artists such as Carrie Underwood, Luke Bryan, Blake Shelton, Toby Keith, Jason Aldean, Miranda Lambert, Tim McGraw, Rascal Flatts, Brad Paisley, Eric Church, Florida Georgia Line and many other country music stars. The 2017 edition of Boots and Hearts Music Festival took place from August 10–13, 2017 and featured Luke Bryan, Keith Urban, Brantley Gilbert, Brett Eldredge, Eli Young Band and Dan + Shay.

=== The Big Feastival Canada 2017 ===
The Big Feastival was an idea originally conceived by Jamie Oliver in the UK in 2011. The event was designed and built around food, music and fun for the entire family. IMG produced the hugely successful event in the UK since 2012 and brought this unique festival format to Canada. Held August 18–20, 2017, it showcased the country's top culinary talent, including Canadian celebrity chef, television personality, and restaurateur Chuck Hughes. Activities included culinary workshops, educational sessions, live cooking demonstrations in the Big Kitchen and artisanal products at the Producer's Market. The 2017 edition of The Big Feastival featured Weezer, Ben Harper, The Strumbellas, Basia Bulat, Choir!Choir!Choir!, De La Soul, Dwayne Gretzky, Magic! and Wintersleep.

=== OK Friday ===
2015–present

The OK Friday Barn Fair is a community-driven art and farmers market held seasonally at Burl's Creek Event Grounds. In collaboration with Southern Georgian Bay Farmers Markets, OK Friday sells a wide range of farm fresh produce and a variety of ready-to-eat items, alongside local bakeries, artisanal producers, and craft makers.

=== Event history ===
- WayHome Music & Arts Festival 2015–2017
- Boots and Hearts Music Festival 2015–present
- OK Friday Farmer's Market 2015–present
- The Big Feastival Canada 2017
- Huronia Fur & Feathers 1995–2017
- Spring Automotive Flea Market 1984–2017
- Fall Automotive Flea Market 1984–2017
- The Tragically Hip 2012
- Zombie Dash 2012
- CMT Music Festival 2011
- Toby Keith 2009
- Jack Johnson 2008
- The Rolling Stones – No Filter Tour 2019
- Big Sky Music Festival 2019
- All Your Friends Fest 2024–present
