= Neverland (Andrew Hyatt song) =

2020 song by Andrew Hyatt

Single by Andrew Hyatt

from the EP Neverland
- Released: November 18, 2020
- Genre: Country
- Length: 3:26
- Label: 604
- Songwriter(s): Erik Dylan Anderson; Michael Tyler Spragg; Danick Dupelle
- Producer(s): Scott Cooke

Andrew Hyatt singles chronology
"I Needed That" (2020)	"Neverland" (2020)	"Close to You" (2022)

Music video
- "Neverland" on YouTube

"Neverland" is a song recorded by Canadian country music artist Andrew Hyatt. The song was written by Erik Anderson, Michael Spragg, and Danick Dupelle, while Scott Cooke produced the track. It is the title track and third single off Hyatt's 2020 extended play Neverland.

== Background ==
Although Hyatt did not write the song, he felt an attachment to it upon hearing it. He described "the idea of 'Neverland'" as "something that seems unattainable". Hyatt felt a personal connection, once being told by a guidance counsellor in high school that being a musician was "not a real job". To him, the idea of "Neverland" represents the "journey of taking everybody's no's and proving them wrong" and the song connected with him through the sense of "reaching that seemingly unattainable goal".

== Critical reception ==
Joshua Murray and Trish Cassling of The Reviews Are In spoke favourably of the song, stating that when Hyatt "starts laying out his feelings it never feels like he’s pandering or trying too hard", adding that on "Neverland" it "hits hard in the heart".

== Music video ==
The official music video for "Neverland" premiered on September 18, 2020.

== Charts ==
Chart performance for "Neverland"
Chart (2021)	Peak position
Canada (Canadian Hot 100)	88
Canada Country (Billboard)	13
