= Things My Mama Says =

2024 song by Hailey Benedict

Single by Hailey Benedict
- Released: October 4, 2024
- Genre: Country
- Length: 2:52
- Label: Local Hay; Big Loud; Mercury; Republic
- Songwriter(s): Hailey Benedict; Ava Suppelsa; Clara Park
- Producer(s): Scott Cooke; Joey Moi

Hailey Benedict singles chronology
"Damn You July" (2023)	"Things My Mama Says" (2024)	"Carl Dean" (2025)

Visualizer
- "Things My Mama Says" on YouTube

"Things My Mama Says" is a song recorded by Canadian country singer Hailey Benedict. She wrote the song with Ava Suppelsa and Clara Park, while Scott Cooke and Joey Moi produced the track. It marked her first release after signing with Big Loud Records and its Canadian imprint Local Hay.

== Background and content ==
In a press release, Benedict shared how she learned of her mother's cancer diagnosis the same day that she signed her record deal with Big Loud. She stated that her mother has always been one of her biggest supporters, and despite her diagnosis, she encouraged Benedict to continue pursuing her dreams and move to Nashville. Shortly thereafter, she wrote "Things My Mama Says" in around two hours during a co-writing session with Ava Suppelsa and Clara Park, taking inspiration from the real-life feelings and situation that she was dealing with.

Benedict described "Things My Mama Says" as "[illustrating] the irony of how our mothers spend their lives worrying about us, and then one day, the roles reverse". At first, she was hesitant to release such a personal song, but she later realized how other people had similar emotions, and hoped that listeners could "relate to the song in their own way, drawing from their own relationships with loved ones".

== Critical reception ==
Rosie Long Decter of Billboard Canada framed the song as a "heartfelt reflection on lessons learned". Chad Carlson of Today's Country Magazine favourably reviewed the track, calling it "an irresistibly-relatable track that invites the listener into the heart and mind of the narrator, ebbing and flowing its way through an array of thoughts and emotions from start to finish". He praised the lyrics as "forthcoming and honest" and the tempo as "ear-pleasing," while noting how the song still "[maintains] focus on lyrical significance of the subject matter".

== Accolades ==
Year	Award	Category	Result	Ref
2025	Country Music Alberta	Single of the Year	Won	

== Music video ==
The official visualizer for "Things My Mama Says" premiered on YouTube on October 4, 2024, the day of the song's release. Benedict released an official lyric video on the same day.

== Credits and personnel ==
Credits adapted from AllMusic.

- Austin Brown – assistant engineer
- Ava Suppelsa – composition
- Bryan Sutton – keyboards
- Clara Park – composition
- Dave Cohen – pedal steel guitar
- Hailey Benedict – composition, lead vocals
- Jerry Roe – drums
- Jimmie Lee Sloas — bass guitar
- Joey Moi — executive producer
- Josh Ditty — recording
- Justin Schipper — backing vocals
- Kristen Rogers — acoustic guitar
- Ryan Yount — assistant engineer
- Scott Cooke — mixing, production
- Ted Jensen — mastering engineer
- Tom Bukovac — electric guitar

== Chart performance ==
"Things My Mama Says" debuted as the most-added song on Canadian country radio in October 2024. It later reached a peak of number six on Billboard Canada Country for the week of March 22, 2025, its twenty-second week on the chart. The song marked Benedict's first career top ten hit.

Chart performance for "Things My Mama Says"
Chart (2025)	Peak position
Canada Country (Billboard)	6
