= The Abrams =

Canadian country band

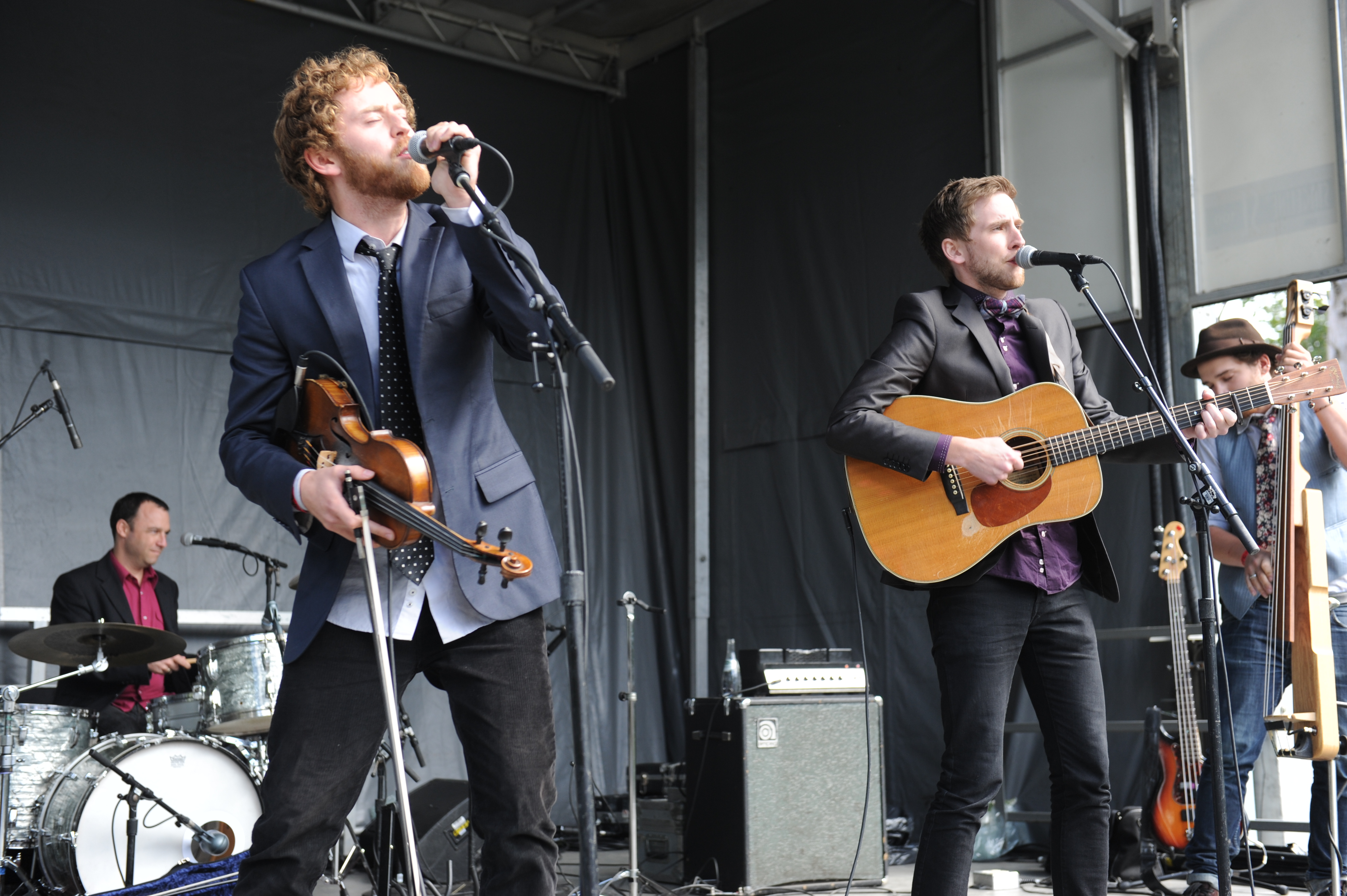
- The Abrams Brothers at the Toronto International Film Festival, Canadian Film Centre Annual BBQ 2012

Background information
- Origin: Kingston, Ontario, Canada
- Genres: Country, bluegrass, folk
- Label: Warner Music
- Members: John Abrams; James Abrams
- Website: www.theabramsmusic.com

The Abrams (formerly The Abrams Brothers) are a Canadian country band composed of fourth-generation musicians John Abrams and James Abrams. They have performed with acts such as John Hammond, Feist, Dean Brody, The Chicks, Nitty Gritty Dirt Band, and Luke Combs.

== Biography ==
The Abrams have been performing together since John was 11 and James was 9. In 2005, the group was named Emerging Artist of the Year at the Canadian Bluegrass Music Awards. In 2006, they received the Daniel Pearl Memorial Violin. The Abrams Brothers at age 12 and 15, were the youngest Canadian duo to play the esteemed Grand Ole Opry stage in Nashville, Tennessee.

The Abrams released a Bob Dylan and Arlo Guthrie tribute album entitled Blue On Brown in 2009. Arlo Guthrie responded to the record by saying the band was "way too young to be playing that good. I know I will be hearing from The Abrams Brothers for a long time to come."

The band released their first album of original material Northern Redemption in 2011 on Fontana North/United For Opportunity. The album was produced by Canadian singer-songwriter/producer Chris Brown formerly of The Bourbon Tabernacle Choir, whose credits include The Barenaked Ladies, Ani DiFranco, and Tony Scherr.

The Abrams have been involved in many community service projects in their hometown of Kingston, Ontario, including the Robinson Community Garden, which supplies the local Salvation Army, Boys and Girls Club, and Martha's Table. In spring 2012 they launched the Musicville Ontario initiative, in which they donated $1000 to a local music education charity.

The Abrams released their major label debut EP on May 20, 2016, via Warner Music Canada. The EP was produced by Gavin Brown at Noble Street Studios in Toronto, Ontario. The first single from the album, "Fine" was released April of that year. The album earned the band a CMAO win for Roots Artist/Group of the Year.

On May 15, 2019, The Abrams released a brand new single, "Sounds Good To Me," produced by Matt Rovey, who has worked with Zac Brown Band and Alan Jackson. A new collection of music will be released later in 2019.

== Members ==
- John Abrams – vocals, guitar
- James Abrams – vocals, violin

== Discography ==
The Abrams discography
- Studio albums: 4
- Extended plays: 1
- Live albums: 7
- Singles: 5
- Music videos: 6

=== Albums ===
==== Studio albums ====
Title	Album details
Carrying On	Released: 2004; Label: MasterShield; Format: CD
Iron Sharpens Iron	Released: 2006; Label: MasterShield; Format: CD
Blue On Brown	Released: July 22, 2008; Label: United For Opportunity; Format: CD
Northern Redemption	Released: June 11, 2011; Label: United For Opportunity; Format: CD, digital download

== Extended plays ==
Title	Album details
The Abrams	Released: May 20, 2016; Label: Warner Music; Format: CD, digital download
Reminder	Released: September 20, 2019; Label: Warner Music; Label: CD Digital download, streaming

== Singles ==
Title	Year	Album
"Mermaid Town"	2010	Non-album single
Fine	2016	The Abrams
Spend Your Life With Me	2016	The Abrams
Champion	2017	The Abrams
Sounds Good To Me	2019	Reminder

== Music videos ==
Title	Year	Album
Viva la Vida	2009	Northern Redemption
Mermaid Town	2010	—N/a
Northern Redemption	2012	Northern Redemption
Fine	2016	The Abrams
Champion	2016	The Abrams
Spend Your Life With Me	2017	The Abrams

== Awards and nominations ==
Year	Award	Category	Nominee/Work	Result	Ref
2017	CMAO Awards	Roots Artist or Group of the Year	The Abrams	Won	
2017	CMAO Awards	Group or Duo of the Year	The Abrams	Nominated	
2017	CMAO Awards	Rising Star Award	The Abrams	Nominated	
2023	Country Music Association of Ontario	Roots Artist or Group of the Year	The Abrams	Nominated	
