= Andrew Hyatt =

Canadian singer-songwriter

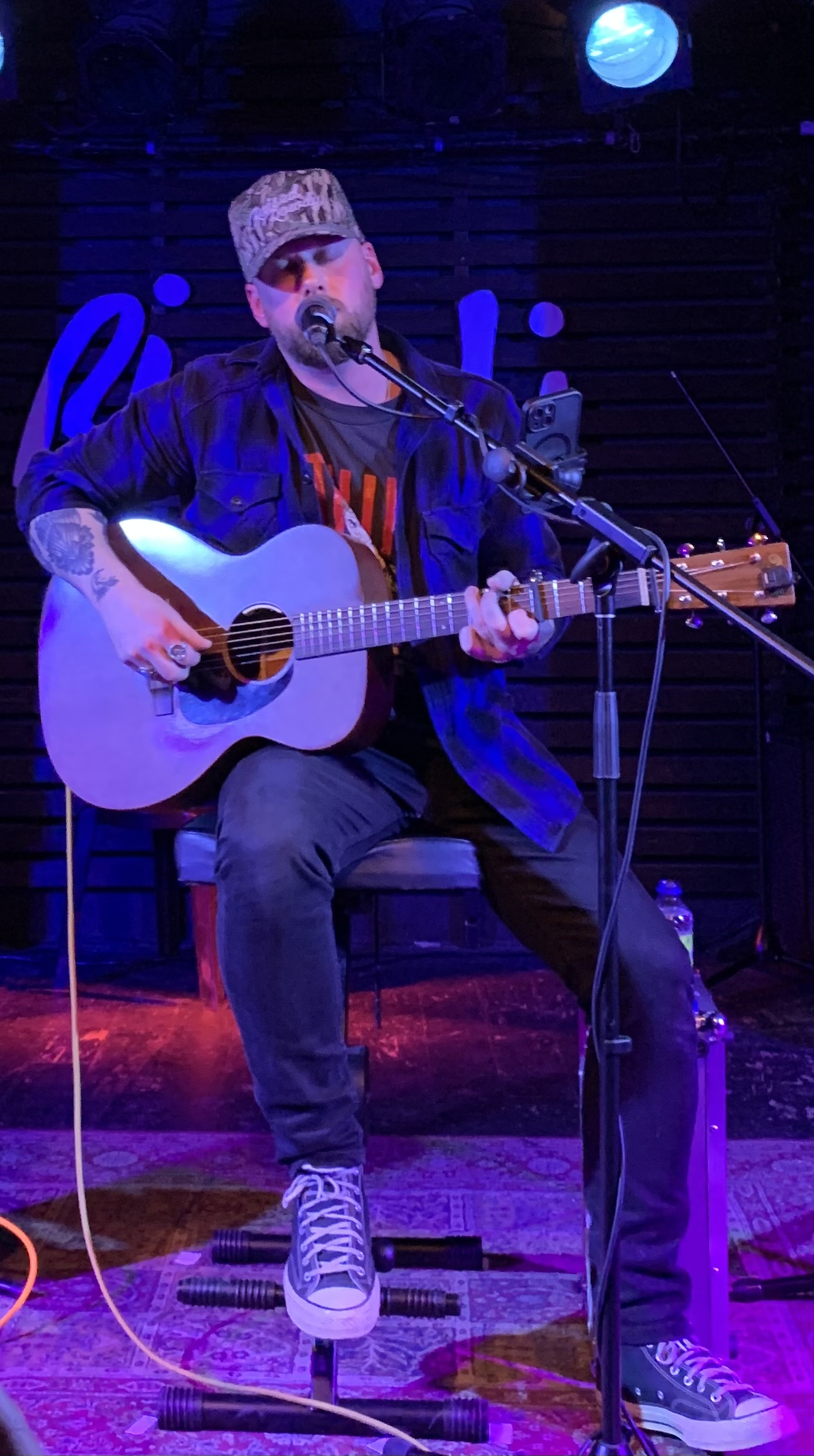
- Hyatt performing in Toronto, Ontario, in March 2025

Background information
- Born: May 7, 1987 (age 39); Sudbury, Ontario, Canada
- Genres: Country; country rock; americana
- Occupation: Singer-songwriter
- Years active: 2012–present
- Labels: 604; Wax
- Website: www.theandrewhyatt.com

Andrew Hyatt is a Canadian country singer-songwriter from Sudbury, Ontario, most noted as a CCMA winner for Rising Star of the Year at the 2022 Canadian Country Music Awards. He has released one studio album Iron & Ashes, and seven extended plays, and has charted multiple top twenty singles on the Billboard Canada Country chart, including "Neverland".

== Biography ==
After finishing high school, Hyatt briefly worked as a youth pastor at a church. He then worked as an iron worker at a nickel mine in his hometown of Sudbury for three years. After leaving that job, Hyatt went to school for record production, then enrolled at a school for policing. In his late teens and early twenties, he performed in a Christian rock band. After the band broke up, Hyatt began a solo career and released his debut EP Never Back Down in 2015 on Wax Records.

Hyatt released his full-length debut album Iron & Ashes in May 2017. The album included his first charting single "On Me". In late 2017, he signed with 604 Records and released the single "Do It With You", which later became his first top ten single on the Billboard Canada Country airplay chart. Hyatt won the SiriusXM "Top of the Country" competition. He received three nominations at the Country Music Association of Ontario awards in 2018, for Male Artist of the Year, Album of the Year and Rising Star of the Year. Hyatt released the companion EPs Cain in 2018 and Abel in 2019. Hyatt supported the EPs by touring as an opening act for Dean Brody and Tim Hicks.

In 2020, Hyatt had begun a 36-date tour opening for Gord Bamford when the COVID-19 pandemic shut down the tour. He turned to further recording, releasing the EP Neverland in 2020. It included the singles "Didn't Know Me", "I Needed That", and "Neverland", the latter of which became Hyatt's first song to chart on the all-genre Canadian Hot 100. In 2021, he released The Wanderspace Sessions featuring three stripped-down versions of his singles. That year, he also released the EP Wild Flowers, which was the follow-up to Neverland. He was a nominee for "Rising Star" at the 2021 Canadian Country Music Awards.

In 2022, Hyatt released the EP Four Good Years. It was subsequently nominated for "Album of the Year" at the 2023 Canadian Country Music Awards. In January 2024, he released the EP L Is For. In the spring of 2024, Hyatt embarked on "The Country Mixtape Tour" across Canada as a co-headliner alongside Shawn Austin and Tyler Joe Miller.

In February 2025, Hyatt released the song "Between the Lines", part of an EP titled "Andrew Hyatt and the Ten Year War". He embarked on a headlining tour of the same name in Ontario in March 2025. Hyatt received nominations for four awards at the 2025 CMAOntario Awards, including Male Artist of the Year.

== Discography ==
=== Studio albums ===
Title	Details
Iron & Ashes	Released May 12, 2017; Label: Wax; Format: Vinyl, digital download, streaming

=== Extended plays ===
Title	Details
Never Back Down	Released: September 25, 2015; Label: Wax; Format: Digital download, streaming
Cain	Released: October 19, 2018; Label: 604; Format: CD, digital download, streaming
Abel	Released: April 19, 2019; Label: 604; Format: Digital download, streaming
Neverland	Released: October 30, 2020; Label: 604; Format: CD, digital download, streaming
Wild Flowers	Released: May 28, 2021; Label: 604; Format: Digital download, streaming
Four Good Years	Released: May 6, 2022; Label: 604; Format: CD, digital download, streaming
L Is For	Released: January 5, 2024; Label: 604; Format: Digital download, streaming
Andrew Hyatt and the Ten Year War	Released: August 29, 2025; Label: 604; Format: Digital download, streaming, vinyl

=== Singles ===
List of singles, with selected peak chart positions
Year	Title	Peak chart positions		Album
Year	Title	CAN	CAN Country	Album
2014	"Love Drunk"	—	—	Never Back Down
2015	"Livin' the Dream"	—	—	Never Back Down
2016	"MGR (Me and a Girl and a Radio)"	—	—	Iron & Ashes
2016	"That's How I'm Livin'"	—	—	Iron & Ashes
2017	"On Me"	—	11	Iron & Ashes
2017	"Do It with You"	—	8	Non-album single
2018	"Habit"	—	14	CAIN
2018	"My Kind of Crazy"	—	48	CAIN
2019	"Didn't Know Me"	—	17	Neverland
2020	"I Needed That"	—	30	Neverland
2020	"Neverland"	88	13	Neverland
2022	"Close to You"	—	39	Four Good Years
2022	"Four Good Years"	—	31	Four Good Years
2023	"Still Somethin'"	—	—	Four Good Years
2024	"L Is For"	—	43	L Is For
2025	"Sometimes It Don't"	—	—	Non-album singles
2026	"Time After Time" (with Meghan Patrick)	—	42	Non-album singles
"—" denotes releases that did not chart

==== Christmas singles ====
Year	Single
2019	"Have Yourself a Merry Little Christmas"
2020	"Put a Bow on It"
2021	"Santa Is a Good Ole Boy"
2022	"All We Need"
