= Allan Rayman =

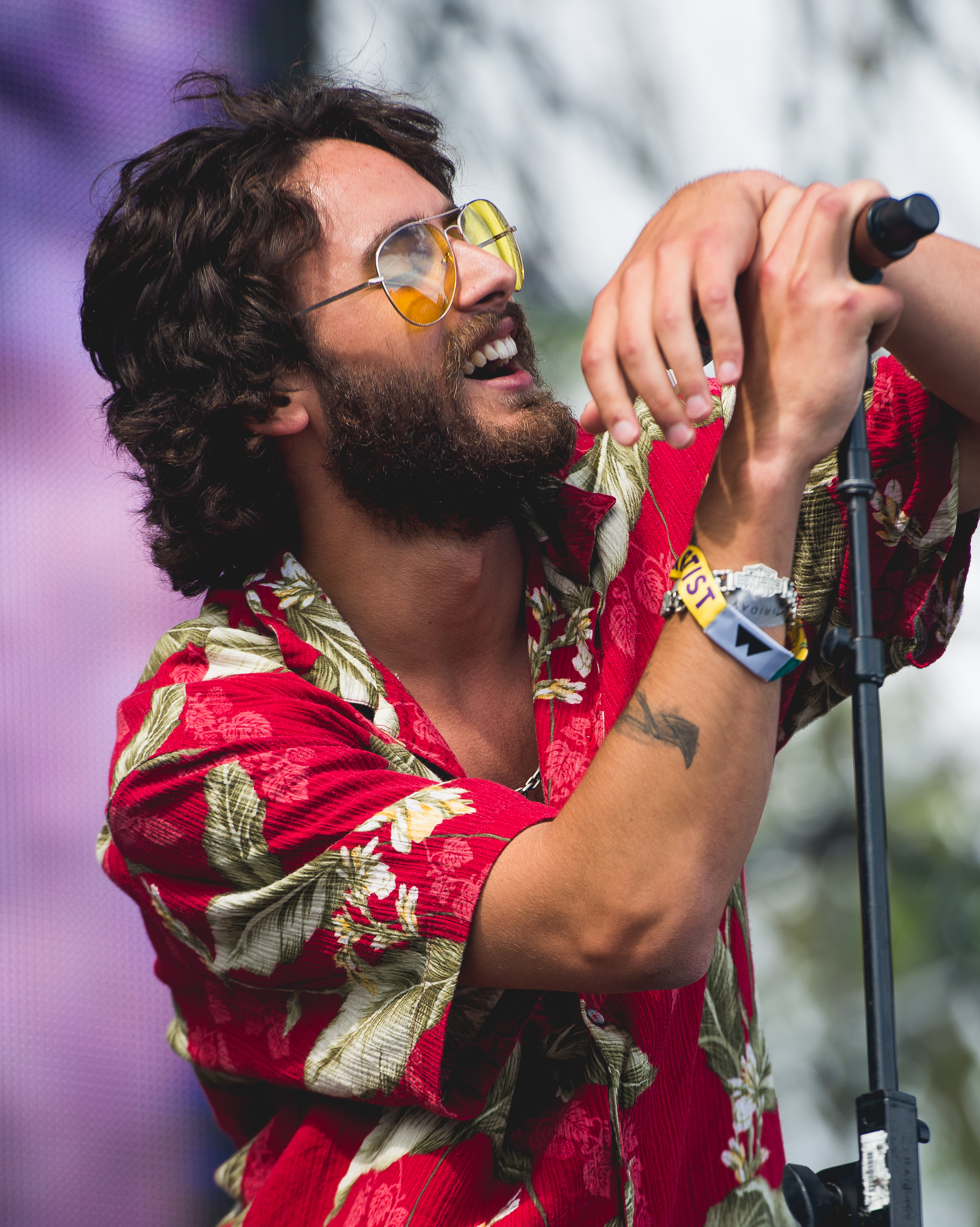
- Rayman performing at the WayHome Music & Arts Festival 2017

Background information
- Genres: Alternative R&B, hip hop, grunge, alternative rock
- Occupation: Singer
- Years active: 2013–present
- Label: Communion Records
- Website: https://allanrayman.com

Allan Rayman is a singer/songwriter based in Toronto, Ontario, Canada. He is signed to Communion Music and has released six albums: Hotel Allan (2016), Roadhouse 01 (2017), Harry Hard-on (2018), Christian (2020), Roadhouse 02 (2022), and The All Allan Hour (2024), as well as many EPs, including Courtney (2017) and Verona's Mixtape (2020).

He promoted the release of Roadhouse 01 with performances for CBC Music's First Play Live Sessions on January 24, 2017, and Billboard's Live Sessions on February 23, 2017.

He received a Juno Award nomination for Breakthrough Artist of the Year at the Juno Awards of 2018.

== Discography ==
=== Albums ===
- Hotel Allan (2016)
- Roadhouse 01 (2017)
- Harry Hard-on (2018)
- Christian (2020)
- Roadhouse 02 (2022)
- The All Allan Hour (2024)
- #1 Girl (2025)

=== EPs ===
- Courtney (2017)
- Verona's Mixtape (2020)
- Books / Waste My Time (2021)
- Rider & Frank Unplugged (2023)
- Chapter 1 (2024)
- Chapter 2 (2024)
- Chapter 3 (2024)

=== Live albums ===
- Unplugged at CBC (2017)
- Live in Minneapolis 12/11/19 (2020)
- Verona Unplugged (2020)

=== Non-album and non-EP singles ===
- "All At Once" (2016)
- "Much Too Much" (2016)
- "Poison" (2019)
- "Pretty Bug (feat. James Vincent McMorrow)" (2020)
- "The Bird & the Cage" (2021)
- "Lyla Emily" (2021)
