= Larry Berrio =

Canadian country music singer

- Born: Larry Barriault
- Origin: Sudbury, Ontario, Canada
- Genres: Country, Country rock
- Occupation: Singer-songwriter
- Instruments: Vocals, guitar, harmonica
- Years active: 1996–present
- Labels: Rock Town Promotions / Independent
- Website: www.larryberrio.com

Larry Berrio (born Larry Barriault in Sudbury, Ontario, Canada) is a Canadian country music singer-songwriter. Berrio's debut album, RPM, was released in March 2009 by 306 Records. The album was produced and recorded with Gil Grand and Brady Seals together with band members from Jason Aldean's band in Nashville. He was the featured artist online CMT from 13 to 26 July 2009. His single "In the Rough" became the new intro song for Canada in the Rough when season 6 was launched in January 2010.

Berrio released his second album in February 2015. The new record is produced by Brian Allen and engineered by Jason Barry out of Barrytones Studios.

== Discography ==
=== Albums ===
Title	Details
Angelic 2 The Core	Release date: 24 March 2009; Label: 306 Records

=== Extended plays ===
Title	Details
The Journey	To be released; Label: Rock Town Promotions

=== Singles ===
Year	Single	Album
2008	"Boots or Hearts"	RPM
2009	"Boomerang"	RPM
2009	"Hay Hay Hay"	RPM
2009	"In the Rough"	RPM
2010	"Rock Town"	RPM
2010	"Cut the Dust"	RPM
2012	"Family BBQ"	The Journey
2014	"No Guts, No Glory"	The Journey
2015	"Get It Right the First Time"	The Journey
2015	"Hooked"	The Journey

=== Music videos ===
Year	Video	Director
2010	"Rock Town"	Adrian Cox
2014	"No Guts, No Glory"	Ian Johnson
