= River Town Saints =

Canadian country music group

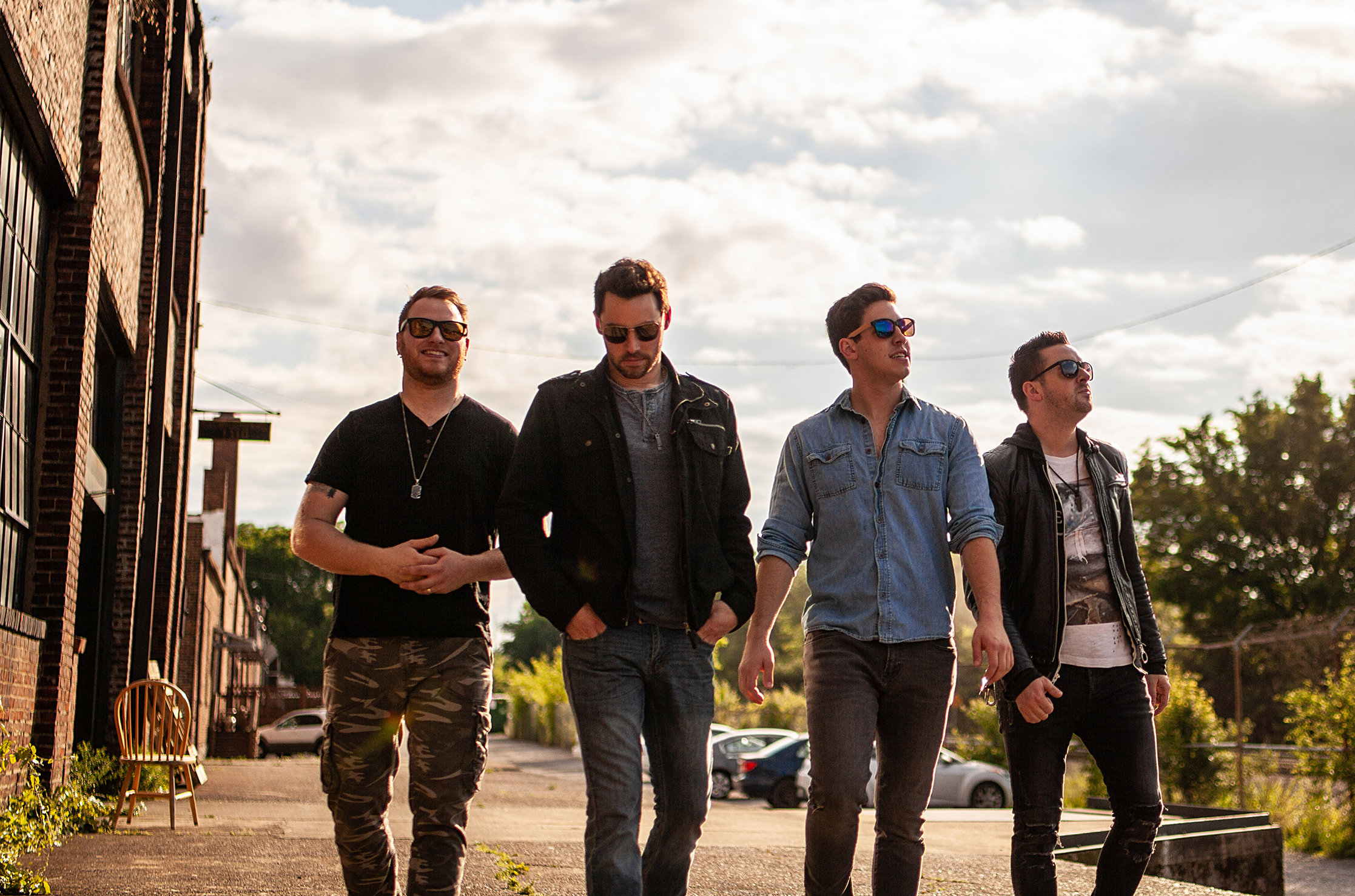
- River Town Saints walking in Nashville

Background information
- Origin: Arnprior, Ontario, Canada
- Genres: Country
- Years active: 2013–present
- Labels: Sakamoto Music; Open Road Recordings
- Members: Chris McComb; Jeremy Bortot; Chase Kasner
- Past members: Chris Labelle; Daniel Di Giacomo; Jordan Potvin; Cory Apolcer; Holt Stuart-Hitchcox
- Website: www.rivertownsaints.com

River Town Saints is a Canadian country music group from Arnprior, Ontario, composed of Chris McComb, Jeremy Bortot, Jordan Potvin, Chase Kasner, and Joey Patrois. Labelle, McComb and Bortot formed the trio Labelle in 2014, later adding Potvin and Daniel DiGiacomo and changing their name to River Town Saints. On February 21, 2019, DiGiacomo died unexpectedly at the age of 31. Afterwards, the band added Chase Kasner. Patrois initially filled in on bass before joining the band officially a short while later.

The group began playing shows around their hometown in 2014. They signed to Open Road Recordings in July 2015 and released their debut single, "A Little Bit Goes a Long Way", in November of that same year. The song debuted on the Billboard Canada Country chart in January 2016, eventually peaking at #31. A music video, filmed in Ottawa, premiered on CMT the following month. Their follow up single, "Cherry Bomb", released May 6, 2016, saw greater success, peaking at #24 on the Billboard Canadian Country Charts. The band released their third single "Bonfire" in January 2017, and it was their first song to debut on the Canadian Country Top 40, coming in at #39 its first week on radio. It went on to become the band's first Top 10 hit in April 2017, peaking at #9.

In 2016, the band was nominated for the CCMA award in the Rising Star category. Their album River Town Saints was released on June 9, 2017.

In 2019, their lead singer Chris Labelle left the band to pursue a solo career, and the band's bass player, Dan Di Giacomo, died unexpectedly. The band reformed with a new lead singer, Chase Kasner, and a new bass player, Joe Patrois. Cory Apolcer has been their drummer since 2021 and Holt Stuart-Hitchcox has been their bass player since 2025. In 2025, Cory and Holt left the band due to irreconcilable differences.

== Discography ==
=== Studio albums ===
Title	Details
River Town Saints	Release date: June 9, 2017; Label: Open Road Recordings; Formats: CD, digital download

=== Singles ===
Year	Single	Peak positions	Album
Year	Single	CAN Country	Album
2015	"A Little Bit Goes a Long Way"	31	River Town Saints
2016	"Cherry Bomb"	24	River Town Saints
2016	"Bonfire"	9	River Town Saints
2017	"Woke Up Like This"	32	River Town Saints
2018	"You Get to Me"	38	—N/a
2021	"Long Time Coming"	41	Long Time Coming
2021	"What Ya Doin' Tonight"	46	Non-album singles
2022	"Name Drop"	—	Non-album singles
2023	"She Got That"	—	Non-album singles
2024	"Lying in Bed" (featuring Kaylee Bell)	—	Non-album singles

=== Music videos ===
Year	Video
2015	"A Little Bit Goes a Long Way"
2016	"Cherry Bomb"
2016	"Bonfire"
2017	"Woke Up Like This"
2018	"You Get to Me"
2020	"Long Time Coming"
2021	"What Ya Doin' Tonight"

== Awards and nominations ==
Year	Association	Category	Result	Ref
2016	Canadian Country Music Association Awards	Rising Star	Nominated	
2017	Country Music Association of Ontario Awards	Single of the Year - "Cherry Bomb"	Won	
2017	Country Music Association of Ontario Awards	Group or Duo of the Year	Nominated	
2017	Country Music Association of Ontario Awards	Rising Star Award	Nominated	
2017	Country Music Association of Ontario Awards	Fan's Choice	Nominated	
2017	Country Music Association of Ontario Awards	Music Video of the Year - "Cherry Bomb"	Nominated	
2018	Canadian Radio Music Awards	Best New Group or Solo Artist: Country - "Bonfire"	Won	
2023	Country Music Association of Ontario	Group or Duo of the Year	Nominated	
2025	Country Music Association of Ontario	Group or Duo of the Year	Nominated	
