= Oro-Medonte =

Township in Simcoe County, Ontario, Canada

- Township (lower-tier)
- Township of Oro-Medonte
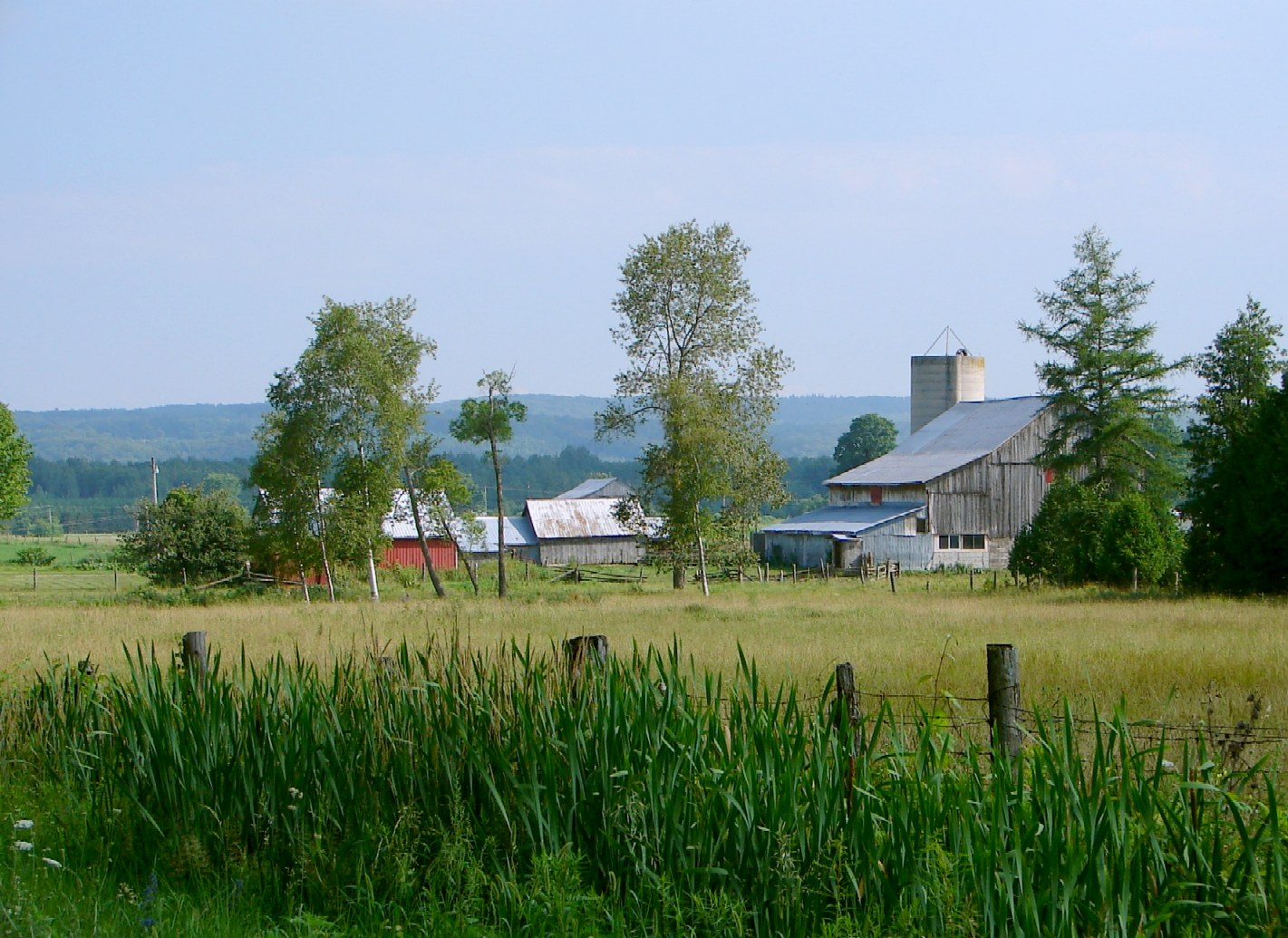
- Rural scene near Mount St. Louis
- Motto: Proud Heritage, Exciting Future
- Location within Simcoe County Location within Southern Ontario
- Coordinates: 44°34′N 79°35′W
- Country: Canada
- Province: Ontario
- County: Simcoe
- Incorporated: January 1, 1994

Government
  - Mayor: Randy Greenlaw
  - Deputy Mayor: Peter Lavoie
  - Councillors: List: Lori Hutcheson; John Bard; David Clark; Peter Lavoie; Rich Schell; Robert Young
  - MPs: Doug Shipley
  - MPPs: Doug Downey, Jill Dunlop

Area
  - Land: 585.42 km^{2} (226.03 sq mi)

Population (2021)
  - Total: 23,017
  - Density: 35.8/km^{2} (93/sq mi)
- Time zone: UTC-5 (Eastern (EST))
  - Summer (DST): UTC-4 (EDT)
- Postal code FSA: L0L, L3V
- Area codes: 705, 249, 683
- Website: www.oro-medonte.ca

Oro-Medonte is a township in south-central Ontario, Canada, on the northwestern shores of Lake Simcoe in Simcoe County.

The two townships of Oro and Medonte were originally incorporated on January 1, 1850. They were amalgamated, as well as Hawkstone Police Village (incorporated in 1922), on January 1, 1994, under a restructuring of Simcoe County. It is divided into lines based on the concession system implemented by the British colonial government in the mid-18th century. Currently there are 15 lines that are now streets and highway exits off Highway 11.

== Geography ==
=== Communities ===
The township comprises the communities of:

- Barrillia Park
- Bass Lake Park
- Baywood Park
- Big Cedar Estates
- Braestone
- Carley
- Carthew Bay
- Cedarmont Beach
- Coulson
- Craighurst
- Creighton
- Crown Hill
- Eady
- East Oro
- Edgar
- Eight Mile Point
- Fair Valley
- Fergus Hill Estate
- Knox Corners
- Forest Home
- Foxmead
- Guthrie
- Hawkestone
- Hawkestone Beach
- Hobart
- Horseshoe Valley
- Jarratt
- Lakeview
- Martinville
- Mitchell Square
- Moons Beach
- Moonstone
- Mount St. Louis
- Oro Beach
- Oro Lea Beach
- Oro Park
- Oro Station
- Palm Beach
- Parkside Beach
- Prices Corners
- Roberta Park
- Rugby
- Shanty Bay
- Simcoeside
- Sugar Bush
- Vasey
- Waddington Beach
- Warminster

=== Climate ===
Climate data for Oro-Medonte
Month	Jan	Feb	Mar	Apr	May	Jun	Jul	Aug	Sep	Oct	Nov	Dec	Year
Record high °C (°F)	10.0 (50.0)	13.0 (55.4)	23.0 (73.4)	29.5 (85.1)	32.5 (90.5)	34.0 (93.2)	37.5 (99.5)	34.0 (93.2)	32.5 (90.5)	27.0 (80.6)	21.5 (70.7)	17.0 (62.6)	37.5 (99.5)
Mean daily maximum °C (°F)	−3.6 (25.5)	−2.7 (27.1)	2.9 (37.2)	10.7 (51.3)	18.2 (64.8)	22.5 (72.5)	25.7 (78.3)	24.2 (75.6)	19.3 (66.7)	12.2 (54.0)	5.8 (42.4)	−0.7 (30.7)	11.2 (52.2)
Daily mean °C (°F)	−8.4 (16.9)	−7.7 (18.1)	−2.1 (28.2)	5.7 (42.3)	12.9 (55.2)	17.1 (62.8)	20.6 (69.1)	19.4 (66.9)	14.8 (58.6)	8.2 (46.8)	2.2 (36.0)	−4.8 (23.4)	6.5 (43.7)
Mean daily minimum °C (°F)	−13.1 (8.4)	−12.6 (9.3)	−7.0 (19.4)	0.8 (33.4)	7.5 (45.5)	11.5 (52.7)	15.5 (59.9)	14.6 (58.3)	10.2 (50.4)	3.9 (39.0)	−1.3 (29.7)	−8.8 (16.2)	1.8 (35.2)
Record low °C (°F)	−37.0 (−34.6)	−37.0 (−34.6)	−30.0 (−22.0)	−15.0 (5.0)	−3.5 (25.7)	0.5 (32.9)	7.0 (44.6)	4.0 (39.2)	−3.0 (26.6)	−6.0 (21.2)	−9.0 (15.8)	−35.0 (−31.0)	−37.0 (−34.6)
Average precipitation mm (inches)	103.1 (4.06)	68.1 (2.68)	71.3 (2.81)	72.2 (2.84)	77.6 (3.06)	76.4 (3.01)	77.4 (3.05)	102.4 (4.03)	95.5 (3.76)	89.7 (3.53)	102.5 (4.04)	107.3 (4.22)	1,043.2 (41.07)
Average rainfall mm (inches)	13.9 (0.55)	15.4 (0.61)	38.4 (1.51)	60.9 (2.40)	77.3 (3.04)	76.4 (3.01)	77.4 (3.05)	102.4 (4.03)	95.3 (3.75)	86.5 (3.41)	77.1 (3.04)	29.6 (1.17)	750.6 (29.55)
Average snowfall cm (inches)	89.2 (35.1)	59.6 (23.5)	32.9 (13.0)	11.3 (4.4)	0.4 (0.2)	0 (0)	0 (0)	0 (0)	0 (0)	3.2 (1.3)	25.4 (10.0)	77.7 (30.6)	292.6 (115.2)
Average precipitation days (≥ 0.2 mm)	16.9	11.8	12.4	12.0	12.8	11.7	9.8	12.5	13.6	15.3	15.7	16.9	161.3
Average rainy days (≥ 0.2 mm)	2.6	2.3	6.5	10.6	12.7	11.7	9.8	12.5	13.6	15.0	12.3	4.5	114.2
Average snowy days (≥ 0.2 cm)	14.8	10.2	6.5	2.2	0.17	0	0	0	0	0.73	4.7	13.4	52.7
Source: Environment Canada

== History ==
First Nations had long established encampments and trails on the bank of Hawkestone Creek, Ridge Road, Mount St. Louis, and throughout the Township of Oro-Medonte.

The Huron village of Cahiagué (near Hawkestone) was the capital village of the Ahrendarrhonon (Rock) nation. In 1615, Samuel de Champlain estimated the village to comprise 200 houses.

The War of 1812 drew attention to the militarily strategic region between Lake Simcoe and Georgian Bay. To provide supplies to the excellent harbour at Penetanguishene, a road of about 35 km was surveyed c. 1813 between the two bodies of water. That road did not actually become a functional road for about 30 years after it was surveyed. In the meantime, townships were created and surveyed on both sides of the Penetanguishene Rd c. 1820. Oro Township was one of those townships. Although there is no documentation about the origin of the name "Oro" it is assumed it came from the Spanish word for gold.

After the War of 1812, Sir Peregrine Maitland, then Lieutenant-Governor of Upper Canada, offered Black veterans grants of land in what was to become the Township of Oro. This was in the area between Kempenfelt Bay on Lake Simcoe and Penetanguishene Bay on Lake Huron's Georgian Bay.

In the 1830s, Richard Hodges established a landing for settlers, mainly from the British Isles, who after arriving by lake steamer, on Lake Simcoe, followed these trails to their settlement in search of independence and land ownership.

Craighurst started as a small community on the Penetanguishene Road in the 1830s. Its post office was established in the 1850s, at its peak in the late 19th century, Craighurst had four hotels, three churches, and a school house.

A thriving community of a tavern, hotel, store and the first post office was located near the lake east of the creek at Hodges' Landing. The first postmaster was Charles Bell. Two dams and three mills sawed logs and ground grains. It is thought that the first mill was established by John Williamson who subsequently built the large brick house on the North-East corner of the Ridge Road and Line No. 11 South. In 1856 a new wharf was constructed and the name was changed from Hodges' Landing to Hawkestone.

The establishment of Shanty Bay was strongly influenced by the Underground Railroad. Many African-American refugees first settled near the water in shanties (small homes), contributing toward the name of the village. Lucius Richard O'Brien (1832–1899), the noted oil and watercolour landscape painter was from Shanty Bay. His father founded the village. Shanty Bay also has one of Canada's oldest "Rammed Earth Construction" churches, St. Thomas Anglican Church, built between 1838 and 1841 and dedicated in 1842. The Church was officially opened on February 27, 1842

In 1866–67, a drill-shed was erected in East Oro by the Oro Company, 35th Battalion the Simcoe Foresters. At this time when the Fenian raids were alarming the country, eight company drill-sheds were built in Simcoe County, the county paying $390 and the government $250 for each. The company was manned by pioneer men of Oro. Local Wm.E. O'Brien of Shanty Bay became Lieutenant Colonel of the Battalion in 1882. This East Oro drill-shed served Oro Company until the start of the 20th century and was dismantled around 1918.

The Toronto, Simcoe and Muskoka Junction Railway was built through the area in 1871. Its route was roughly parallel to the lakeshore, passing through Shanty Bay, Oro Station, and Hawkestone. An extensive station complex evolved at Hawkestone, with a freight shed, stockyards and a massive water tower to supply the requirements of the steam locomotives. The railway was incorporated as a company in 1869 as an extension connecting the Northern Railway of Canada to the Muskoka region and Lake Muskoka, and eventually reached Gravenhurst in 1875. However, financial problems led to increasing integration and eventual merger under the Northern Railway of Canada, which itself went through numerous mergers, becoming part of the Grand Trunk and, later, the Canadian National Railways. In the Canadian National (CN) system, the line through Oro was a part of the Newmarket Subdivision. The section of the line through the township was abandoned in 1996.

A branch of the Canadian Pacific Railway was built through Craighurst in the early 20th century, opening from Bolton to Craighurst in November 1906, when a station was opened. On July 19, 1907, the track was extended to Bala and by June 1908, the line was completed to Sudbury. This is now the MacTier Subdivision, a part of the railway's main line between the east and west.

Edgar was the site of a cold war radar station from 1952 to 1964.

In 1959, the Ukrainian National Federation (UNF) purchased the "Pugsley Farm" property located on the East half of Lot 23 and Lot 24 in Hawkestone. The 200 acres (0.81 km^{2}) were developed into a large recreation area and children's camp where members of the UNF and their families have spent their summers on the shores of Lake Simcoe. A portion of the property was subdivided into 100 lots of 0.5 acres (0.0020 km^{2}) and sold to members of the UNF who built summer homes and cottages adjacent to the UNF. The entire property was named "Sokil", which is the Ukrainian word for "Hawk" in reference to the village of Hawkestone where the community was established. Today the private subdivision is maintained by the UNF, which manages the non-municipal water system, roads and other related issues as well as the recreation area and children's camp, where three children's summer camps run throughout the summer, along with weekend overnight camping area, seasonal cabin rentals and a seasonal trailer park. The property also hosts the St. John the Baptist Ukrainian Catholic chapel where services are conducted each Sunday throughout the summer season.

=== Black history ===
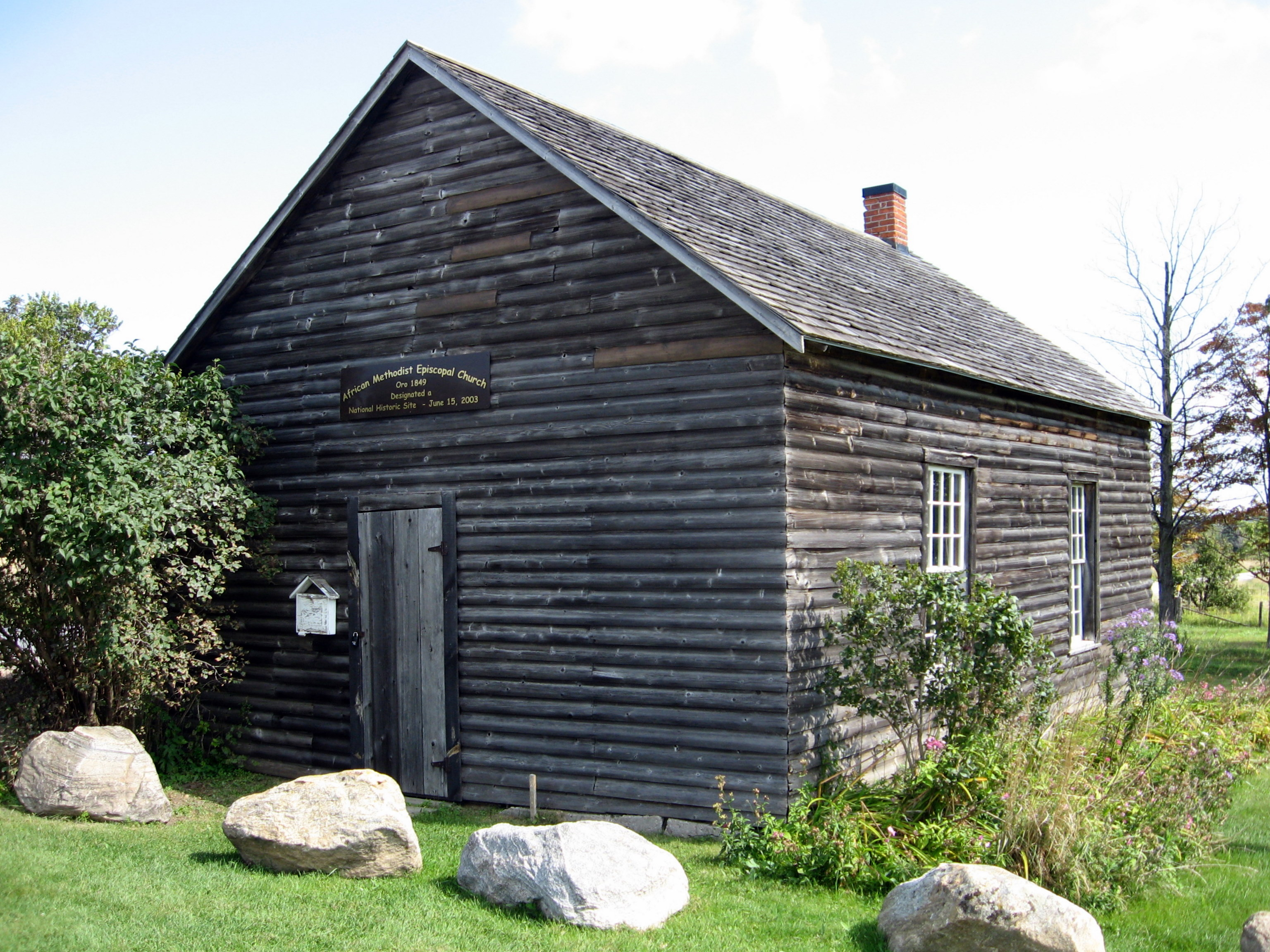
Oro African Methodist Episcopal Church National Historic Site

In 1819, a landmark decision was made in Fort York (now Toronto) to grant land to Black militiamen of Captain Runchey's Company of Coloured Men on an equal basis as it would be granted to Whites. The land designated for Black settlement was in Oro Township. Within a few years all Blacks of any origin could acquire land in Oro Township on an equal basis as any other settler.

There was a military strategy behind the decision. Settlers would provide support for the fort at Penetanguishene by providing food and other local supplies, and, if the war with the U.S. again broke out, the trained militiamen could be armed to defend the region.

Although for years folklore suggested that the Oro Black Settlement was populated by escaped slaves coming to Oro via the underground railroad (UGRR), documentation suggests all Black settlers were freemen. Further, the 1819 settlement preceded by about a decade what is commonly consider the beginning of the UGRR.

The blocks of land on the Penetanguishene Road, were at the time being granted to settlers of European origin. In that one or more Blacks had already established successful farms further east, a road was surveyed parallel to that road and named Wilberforce in honour of William Wilberforce, the British parliamentarian who worked so hard to abolish slavery. The Blacks were settled along this new road.

The Oro Black Settlement grew to about 90 families, then diminished as the settlers found steady income elsewhere (mainly on railway trains and ships on the Great Lakes). The last Oro Black retired to Barrie in the 1940s, and when he died, he was buried in the cemetery beside the Oro African Church.

The Oro African Methodist Episcopal Church School was a rural segregated Black school established in 1849 in Oro-Medonte, alongside the Oro African Methodist Episcopal Church. The school served the children of African Canadian settlers who had been granted land in the Oro settlement by the British colonial government. Operated in tandem with the church, it provided basic literacy and religious education in a log structure built by the community itself. As one of the few early schools for Black students in rural Upper Canada, it reflects the intersection of race, land access, and education in early 19th-century Ontario. The Oro Methodist Episcopal African Church was built out of logs by the Oro Black Settlers and was finished in 1849. It is likely the oldest log African Church still standing in North America. In 2003, it was designated a Canadian national historic site, mainly due to the link the Oro settlers had to the War of 1812. The church had fallen into disrepair, but since the summer of 2015 work has begun on restoring it.

== Demographics ==
In the 2021 Census of Population conducted by Statistics Canada, Oro-Medonte had a population of 23,017 living in 8,636 of its 9,510 total private dwellings, a change of 9.4% from its 2016 population of 21,036. With a land area of 585.42 km^{2} (226.03 sq mi), it had a population density of 39.3/km^{2} (101.8/sq mi) in 2021.

Canada census – Oro-Medonte community profile

	2021	2016	2011
Population	23,017 (+9.4% from 2016)	21,036 (+4.8% from 2011)	20,078 (+0.2% from 2006)
Land area	585.42 km^{2} (226.03 sq mi)	587.08 km^{2} (226.67 sq mi)	586.90 km^{2} (226.60 sq mi)
Population density	39.3/km^{2} (102/sq mi)	35.8/km^{2} (93/sq mi)	34.2/km^{2} (89/sq mi)
Median age	47.6 (M: 47.2, F: 48.4)	47.5 (M: 47.4, F: 47.7)
Private dwellings	9,510 (total) 8,636 (occupied)	9,013 (total)	8,565 (total)
Median household income	$114,000	$95,667

References: 2021 2016 2011

Historical census populations – Oro-Medonte

Year	Pop.	±%
1991	15,713	—
1996	16,698	+6.3%
2001	18,315	+9.7%
2006	20,031	+9.4%

Year	Pop.	±%
2011	20,078	+0.2%
2016	21,036	+4.8%
2021	23,017	+9.4%

Source: Statistics Canada

== Local government ==
The township council is composed of a mayor and six councillors who each represent one of six wards. The members of the council from the elections of October 24, 2022 are:

- Mayor: Randy Greenlaw
- Deputy Mayor: Peter Lavoie (2022-2024), Lori Hutcheson (2024-2026)
- Councillors:
  - Ward 1: Lori Hutcheson
  - Ward 2: John Bard
  - Ward 3: David Clark
  - Ward 4: Peter Lavoie
  - Ward 5: Richard Schell
  - Ward 6: Robert Young

The mayor and deputy mayor also represents the Township at meetings of Simcoe County Council.

== The Battle of Burl's Creek ==
The Battle of Burl's Creek is the title given by journalist Barbara Kay to the current protest and legal battle between Stan Dunford, Republic Live, The Municipal Government of Oro-Medonte, SaveOro and The West Oro Ratepayers Association (WORA).

Burl's Creek Event Grounds is a grounds located on the south side of Highway 11 on Oro-Medonte's 8th Line. It was established in 1994 by Don Hanney, a local businessman, as an event grounds to host small country events such as agricultural fairs, farmers' markets and Highland games. Burl's Creek has also hosted events like the Barrie Auto Flea Market. In 2015 Burl's Creek Event Grounds was sold to Dunford, as well as many other adjacent lots totaling 560 acres. Dunford started to develop the land to make way for a much larger event park.

Several residents of Oro-Medonte have communicated their concerns with the Township Council and have joined together under the organization of SaveOro. In the spring of 2015 the township council passed temporary bylaws that would allow Burl's Creek Event Grounds to use the 560-acre site for camping and parking, but the bylaw was rescinded by council but not before SaveOro had filed a court application. According to Deputy Mayor Ralph Hough, "there was a process in the planning act that we missed so it was never legal".

The venue was scheduled to use the 560 acres for two concerts in the summer of 2015: Wayhome Music Festival featuring Neil Young and Boots and Hearts Music Festival. The temporary bylaw was rescinded and so the concerts remained on the original 94 acres. As of July 26, 2015, the current struggle was continuing between all of the parties.

As of June 2023, this festival has been held in Oro-Medonte in consecutive years since moving from the Bowmanville Area, with a show planned for August 10–13. The event was cancelled in both 2020 & 2021 due to the COVID-19 pandemic.

== Recreation ==
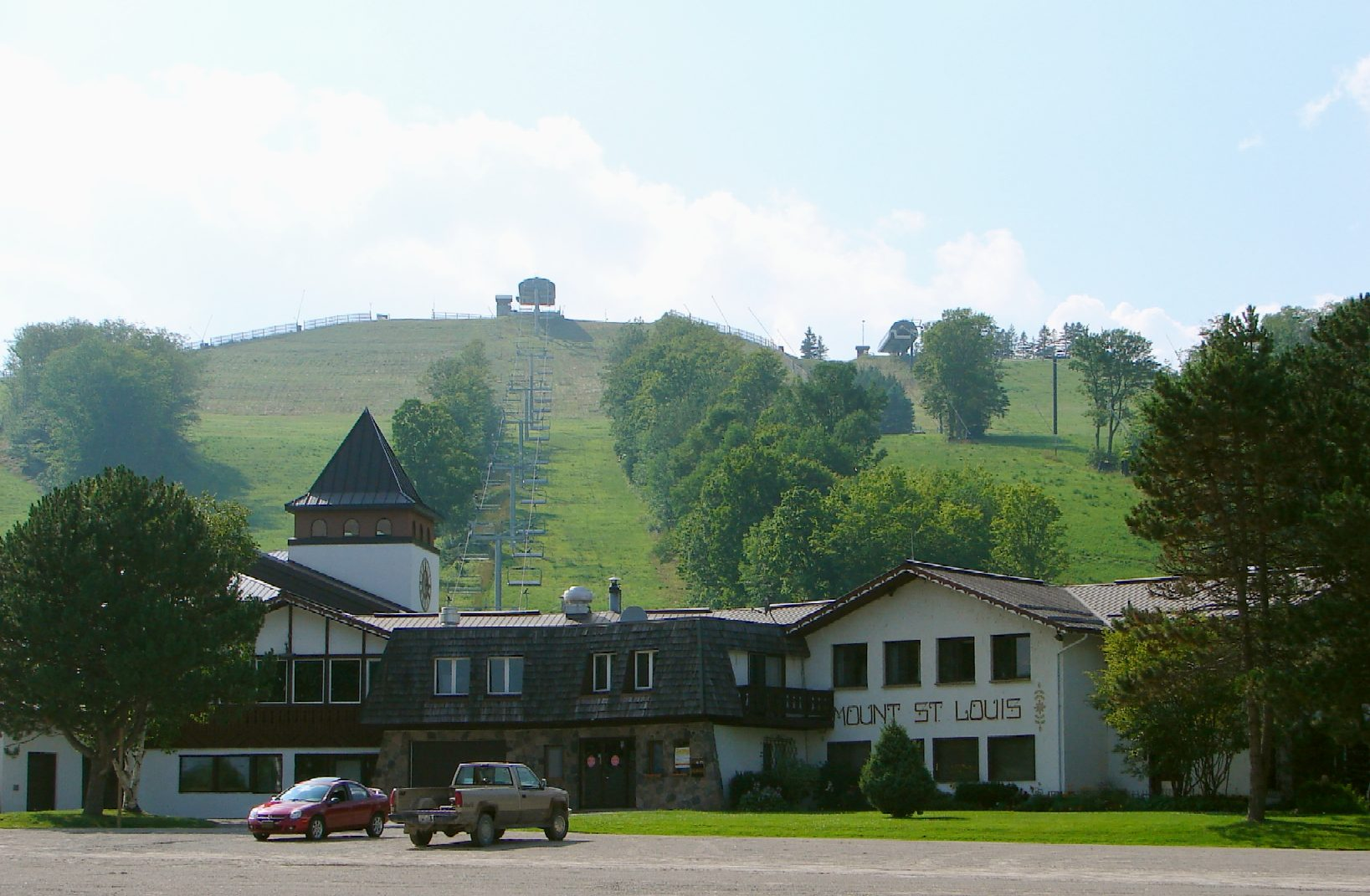
Mount St. Louis Moonstone ski resort

In September 1996, the last Canadian National train passed through the township. In 1998, the land used for the railway was acquired by city council for a shared-use recreational trail stretching from Barrie to Orillia. Sections are used in the winter season by the Ontario Federation of Snowmobile Clubs.

Bass Lake Provincial Park and the Copeland Forest Resources Management Area are located within the township. Three major ski resorts, Mount St. Louis Moonstone, Horseshoe Valley Resort, and Hardwood Ski and Bike, are also located within Oro-Medonte.

== Transportation ==
=== Roads ===
Highway 400, Highway 11 and Highway 12 pass through Oro-Medonte. Penetanguishene Road, a historic colonization road and a former part of Highway 93, defines most of Oro-Medonte's boundary with the neighbouring township of Springwater.

=== Railways ===
The Toronto, Simcoe and Muskoka Junction Railway (TS&MJ) was formed in 1869. Its line headed northeast from a junction at Allandale (now part of Barrie), curving around the tip of Lake Simcoe and passing through the townships which would eventually become Oro-Medonte on its way to Orillia, Washago, and ultimately Gravenhurst. Construction began in 1870, and in 1871 the company was leased to the Northern Railway of Canada and operated as a wholly owned subsidiary thereafter. Service began along the line later that year, with the first known railway station in the township being located at Hawkestone. A basic wooden station building was constructed in 1871, with more outbuildings constructed later. The Northern Railway of Canada would engage in a number of upgrades to the line throughout the early 1870s, such as the extension from Washago to Gravenhurst, as well as conversion of the line from 1,676 mm (5 ft 6 in) Provincial gauge to the 1,435 mm (4 ft 8 1/2 in) standard gauge. In 1875, the line was incorporated into the Northern Railway of Canada and became its Muskoka Branch.

The Northern Railway of Canada was purchased in 1888 by the Grand Trunk Railway (GTR), which in turn undertook improvements such as building a stockyard at Shanty Bay, followed by a passenger station and stable in 1898. At Hawkestone, the Grand Trunk renovated the existing station in 1900 as well as constructing a large stockyard in 1905. In 1917, not long before the Grand Trunk's amalgamation into Canadian National Railways (CN Rail), one of its trains derailed in front of Hawkestone station. Soon after, the line came under Canadian National ownership and formed a component of its Newmarket Subdivision.

The Great Depression saw a slump in rail traffic, and by the mid-1930s, the new owners of the line, CN Rail, had begun to strip back service. The station agent at Hawkestone was removed and replaced with a caretaker in 1936. In 1963–64, CN made a number of abrupt cuts to service, cancelling all service to Shanty Bay and Oro Station, and putting the station building at Hawkestone up for sale. Hawkestone still appeared intermittently on CN train timetables for the next few years, but disappeared for the last time in 1968. The station building was demolished around 1969. Canada's Board of Transport Commissioners had contacted the Township of Oro in 1964 asking if it objected to the removal of Oro's station, but no reply from the township is on file, and the station was demolished in 1966. Carthew also disappeared from timetables in 1973.

Despite the elimination of passenger service in the township, CN passenger and freight trains continued to travel along the line on their way to Orillia. This would continue with the consolidation of passenger services under Via Rail. In 1995, CN successfully applied to the Canadian Transport Commission to abandon the line. The last passenger train to travel the line was Via Rail No. 1 in 1996, the Canadian, headed west to Vancouver. By the end of the year, the line north of Barrie was abandoned, along with Via Rail service to Barrie and Orillia, and the route of the Canadian was shifted to the east shore of Lake Simcoe, to follow the CN Bala Subdivision through Washago. This ended over 125 years of railway operations and history in the township. Today, the former right of way of the rail line has been converted into the Oro-Medonte Rail Trail, a recreational multi-use trail.

=== Bus ===
Starting in August 2019, public transit service returned to Oro-Medonte when Simcoe County LINX Route 3 began operations, connecting Barrie to Orillia along Highway 11, with a single stop in the township at the Lake Simcoe Regional Airport in Oro Station. Ontario Northland intercity motor coaches also travel along the Highway 11 corridor, but travel express through the township and make no stops.

=== Air ===
The Lake Simcoe Regional Airport is located in the township near the community of Guthrie.

== See also ==
- List of townships in Ontario
