= Wide Mouth Mason (album) =

Studio album by Wide Mouth Mason
- Released: March 25, 1997 (Canada); July 8, 1997 (U.S.)
- Recorded: Greenhouse Studios, Vancouver, B.C.
- Genre: Hard rock, Blues-rock
- Length: 48:30
- Label: Warner Music Canada
- Producer: Joel Van Dyke, Wide Mouth Mason

Wide Mouth Mason chronology
The Nazarene (1996)	Wide Mouth Mason (1997)	Where I Started (1999)

Professional ratings
Review scores
Source	Rating
Allmusic	3.5/5 stars

Wide Mouth Mason is the second studio album by the Canadian blues-rock band Wide Mouth Mason and the first to be released on a major label. The band re-recorded most of their independent first album, The Nazarene, for inclusion on the album as well as the new song "This Mourning". The album was certified Gold in Canada on March 11, 1998 on the strength of the singles "Midnight Rain", "My Old Self", "This Mourning" and "The Game".

== Track listing ==
All songs were written by Wide Mouth Mason.

1. "My Old Self" - 3:48
2. "Midnight Rain" - 3:47
3. "Tom Robinson" - 2:59
4. "The River Song" - 3:23
5. "This Mourning" - 4:55
6. "The Preacherman's Song" - 3:04
7. "The Game" - 3:57
8. "All It Amounts To" - 4:29
9. "Corn Rows" - 4:17
10. "Sister Sally" - 5:25
11. "Tell Me" - 3:34
12. "Mary Mary" - 4:15

== Personnel ==
- Shaun Verreault - guitars, vocals
- Earl Pereira - bass guitar, backing vocals
- Safwan Javed - drums, backing vocals

Additional musicians:

- Tanya Hancheroff - backing vocals on tracks 5, 8 and 9
- Mike Kalanj - hammond organ on tracks 10 and 12
- Mike Weaver - rhodes on track 9
- Natasha Boyko - cello on track 4
- Kilarney Secondary High School Choir - backing vocals on track 8
- Colin James - dobro on track 6
