= Lindsay Broughton =

Canadian country music singer-songwriter

- Origin: Brooklin, Ontario, Canada
- Genres: Country
- Occupation: Singer-songwriter
- Years active: 2012–present
- Labels: Curve Music
- Website: lindsaybroughton.com

Lindsay Broughton (born in Brooklin, Ontario) is a Canadian country music singer-songwriter. Broughton is signed to Curve Music with distribution through Sony Music Canada. She has charted three singles on the Billboard Canada Country chart.

Broughton released her self-titled extended play on August 14, 2012. In 2013, she won the Country Music Association of Ontario Rising Star award. She was nominated for Female Artist of the Year in 2014. Her full-length debut album, Take Me There, was released on November 11, 2014.

== Discography ==
=== Extended plays ===
Title	Details
Lindsay Broughton	Release date: August 14, 2012; Label: Curve Music

=== Studio albums ===
Title	Details
Take Me There	Release date: November 11, 2014; Label: Curve Music

=== Singles ===
Year	Single	Peak positions	Album
Year	Single	CAN Country	Album
2012	"Holdin' On to You"	—	Lindsay Broughton
2012	"Restless at the Rain"	—	Lindsay Broughton
2012	"River Wide Enough Song"	45	Take Me There
2013	"Now You Don't"	—	Take Me There
2013	"Never Saw It Coming"	49	Take Me There
2014	"Take Me There"	50	Take Me There
2014	"Stay with Me"	—	Take Me There
2016	"We Don't Mix"	—	TBD
"—" denotes releases that did not chart

=== Music videos ===
Year	Video	Director
2013	"River Wide Enough Song"	
2014	"Never Saw It Coming"	Tom Sokalski
2014	"Take Me There"	Harv Glazer

== Awards and nominations ==
Year	Association	Category	Result
2015	Canadian Country Music Association	Rising Star	Nominated
