= Curve Music =

- Founded: 2002
- Founder: Brian Hetherman
- Distributor(s): Warner Music Canada
- Genre: Americana, Country, Roots Rock, Folk Rock
- Country of origin: Canada
- Location: Toronto, Ontario, Canada
- Official website: www.curvemusic.com

Curve Music is an independent record label based in Toronto, Ontario.

== Artists ==
=== Current artists ===
- Suitcase Sam
- Scott B. Sympathy
- Pretty Archie
- The Weight Band
- Garth Hudson
- Driveway
- Jack Connely
- Holly McNarland
- Lindsay Broughton
- Tom Taylor
- Western Swing Authority

=== Former artists ===
- The Dead South
