= Wide Mouth Mason =

Canadian rock band formed 1995

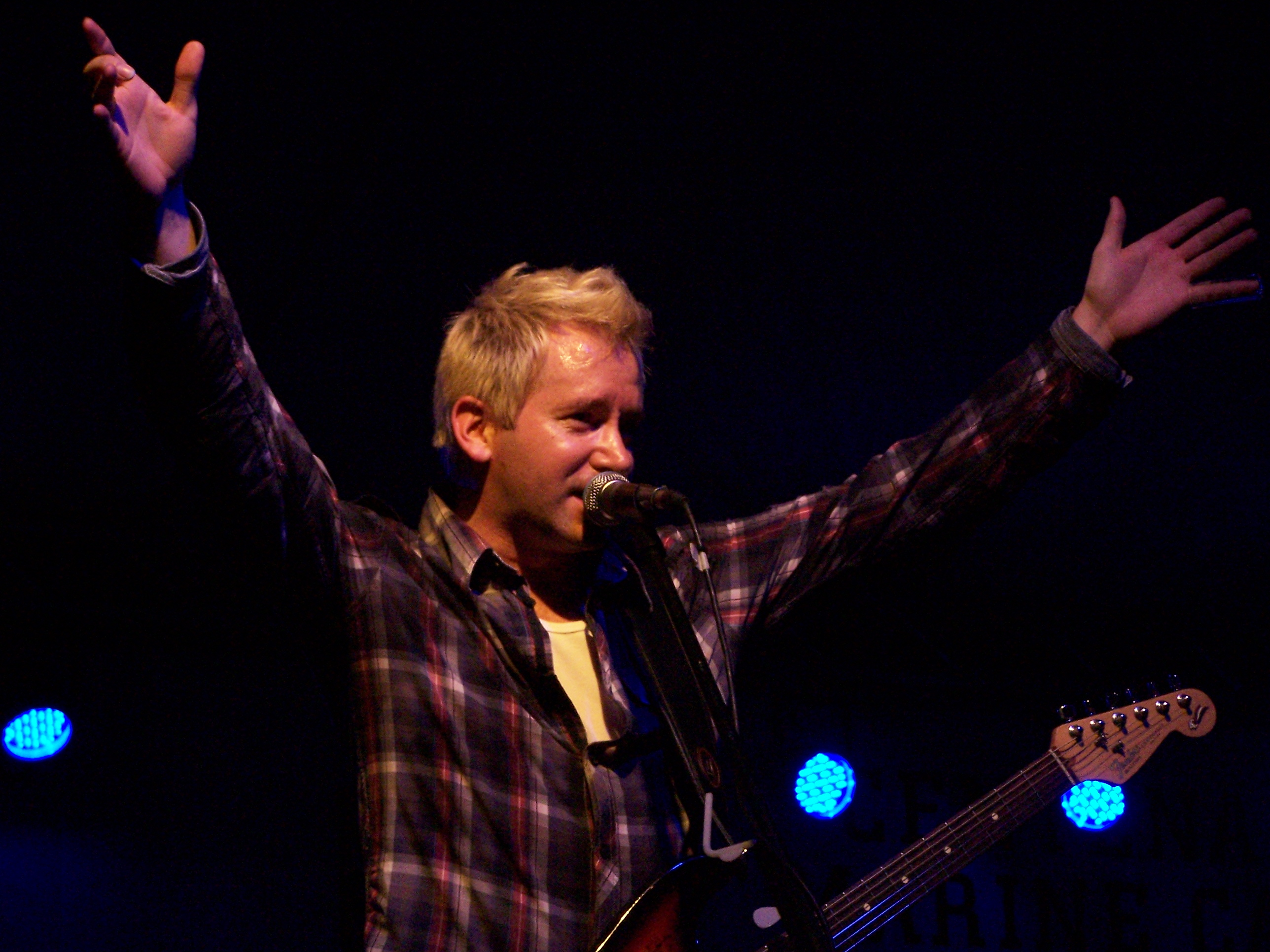
- Verreault of Wide Mouth Mason in 2010

Background information
- Origin: Saskatoon, Saskatchewan, Canada
- Genres: Hard rock, blues rock, alternative rock, jam band
- Years active: 1995–present
- Labels: Warner Music Canada, Curve Music, Universal Music Group
- Members: Shaun Verreault; Safwan Javed
- Past members: Earl Pereira; Gordie Johnson
- Website: widemouthmason.com

Wide Mouth Mason is a Canadian blues-based rock band, consisting of Shaun Verreault (lead vocals, guitar), and Safwan Javed (percussion, backing vocals). Former bassist Earl Pereira was also co-founder of Wide Mouth Mason. The band hails from Saskatoon, Saskatchewan, and has been active since 1995.

== Career ==
Wide Mouth Mason took its name from the jar of the same name, and independently released its first album, The Nazarene in 1996. Although only 2,500 copies were pressed, it still drew interest from the major labels. The band would re-record much of The Nazarene at Greenhouse Studios. The re-recorded tracks and new material attracted the attention of Warner Music Canada, who signed the band to a record deal. The new album would be the band's eponymous major-label debut; it was released in 1997 in Canada and the U.S., and a year later in Japan. It established the group's fusion of pop/rock/blues, and yielded the hit singles "Midnight Rain", "My Old Self", and "This Mourning". The album went Gold in Canada, and the band was nominated for Best New Group at the 1998 Juno Awards.

Wide Mouth Mason released a new album in 1999 with Where I Started, a continuance of its prior sound, but adding elements of jazz and world music. The band returned to Greenhouse Studios to record and mix the album. The band performed at the Rivoli in Toronto in March that year to publicize the release of the album. The album, like its predecessor, attained Gold status in Canada. Its lead single, "Why", backed with scratches and cuts from childhood friend and DJ Muchi Mambo, was a hit in Canada, and was followed by two other hits, "Companion (Lay Me Down)" and "Sugarcane".

In 2000, the band quickly followed up with the album Stew. It was more pop-oriented than the band's previous efforts, but also eclectic, hence the title of the album. The single "Smile" charted well in Canada, the follow-up "Change" was popular on MuchMusic, and the album was nominated for Best Rock Album at the 2001 Junos. From March to May 2001, Wide Mouth Mason opened for AC/DC on their Stiff Upper Lip World Tour.

Wide Mouth Mason returned in 2002 with two albums. The first, Rained Out Parade, featured a heavier emphasis on the blues, a deliberate lo-fi production style, and the featured title track. It received a 2003 Juno nomination for Rock Album of the Year. The second album, Greatest Hits, was released exclusively in China.

When its contract with Warner expired, the band signed a license agreement with Curve Music in 2004. The following year, the band would again release two albums, this time on the same day. One was The Essentials, a greatest-hits album, and the other was Shot Down Satellites, a new studio release featuring a hard rock-centred style and the single "I Love Not Loving You". The disc was produced by the band and their former co-manager, Ross Damude.

In 2006, Shaun Verreault released his solo debut, The Daggerlip Sketches, focusing on acoustic-guitar-based material. It featured new songs and stripped-down versions of familiar material from his band. In early 2008, the Wide Mouth Mason's official website announced that Verreault was releasing a second solo album, titled Two Steel Strings, and that the full band was writing new material for a future release Since then, Earl Pereira left the band to concentrate on his own band, The Steadies (formerly Mobadass), which he has fronted since 2005.

In 2010, Wide Mouth Mason supported ZZ Top with Grady/Big Sugar front-man Gordie Johnson on bass. In March 2011, the band announced that Johnson would be joining the band full-time.

Wide Mouth Mason recorded their first album in five years in late 2010 with Gordie Johnson producing. The band has been playing many of these unrecorded songs live over the last year. The album entitled No Bad Days was released on July 12, 2011.

In 2019, the group released the heavily blues-influenced album I Wanna Go with You. The record prominently features Verreault's "Tri-Slide" technique, using three slides on his fretting hand and playing more lap-steel and dobro-style instruments.

In 2023, the band released the album Late Night Walking on streaming platforms, CD, and vinyl. The album was recorded by Ryan Dahle at his studio on Mayne Island, British Columbia, with Gordie Johnson playing bass.

== Discography ==
- The Nazarene (1996)
- Wide Mouth Mason (1997)
- Where I Started (1999)
- Stew (2000)
- Rained Out Parade (2002)
- Shot Down Satellites (2005)
- No Bad Days (2011)
- I Wanna Go with You (2019)
- Late Night Walking (2023)

== See also ==
- Music of British Columbia
- Music of Saskatchewan
