= Jason Jones (country singer) =

American country music singer (born 1979)

- Born: October 17, 1979 (age 46); Tallahassee, Florida
- Genres: Country
- Occupation: Singer
- Instrument: Vocals
- Years active: 2011-present
- Label: Warner Bros.

Jason Jones (born October 17, 1979 in Tallahassee, Florida) is an American country music singer. He is signed to Warner Bros. Records Nashville, and made his chart debut in May 2011 with the single "Ferris Wheel". The song is included on a six-song digital extended play, released on May 31.

== Biography ==
Jones said that he was introduced to country music while driving between Florida and Georgia. He formed a rock band in high school, and later dropped out of Florida State University to move to Nashville, Tennessee to begin his musical career. In Nashville, he joined a band which performed at the Wildhorse Saloon, and signed to a songwriting contract with Warner/Chappell.

Jones was slated to be working with songwriter and producer Brett Beavers on his debut album, which would have been titled Ferris Wheel. The album's title track was released in May 2011, and it entered the Hot Country Songs charts at number 59 for the chart dated June 11, 2011.

== Personal life ==
Jones resides in Tennessee. He is married and he has three sons.

== Discography ==
=== Extended plays ===
Title	Details
Jason Jones	Release date: May 31, 2011; Label: Warner Bros. Records

=== Singles ===
Year	Single	Peak positions
Year	Single	US Country
2009	"Unlikely Angel"	—
2011	"Ferris Wheel"	43
"—" denotes releases that did not chart

=== Music videos ===
Year	Video	Director
2011	"Ferris Wheel"	Kristin Barlowe
