= 2022 Canadian Country Music Awards =

Music awards ceremony in Canada

- Date: September 11, 2022
- Venue: Scotiabank Saddledome; Calgary, Alberta
- Hosted by: Tenille Townes, Blanco Brown

Television/radio coverage
- Network: Global

The 2022 Canadian Country Music Awards, honouring achievements in Canadian country music, were presented on September 11, 2022 at the Scotiabank Saddledome in Calgary, Alberta, and broadcast by the Global Television Network. The ceremony was hosted by Tenille Townes and Blanco Brown.

Nominees were announced on July 20. A week later, the Canadian Country Music Association revised the nominations to add several more nominees in various categories, noting tabulation errors caused by the increasingly fragmented release strategies used by the modern music industry.

== Nominees and winners ==
=== Music ===
Entertainer of the Year	Album of the Year
Tenille Townes; Tenille Arts; James Barker Band; Brett Kissel; Dallas Smith	Tenille Townes, Masquerades; Don Amero, Nothing Is Meaningless; Gord Bamford, Diamonds in a Whiskey Glass; Jade Eagleson, Honkytonk Revival; Meghan Patrick, Heart On My Glass
Male Artist of the Year	Female Artist of the Year
Dallas Smith; Dean Brody; Jade Eagleson; Brett Kissel; Tyler Joe Miller	Tenille Townes; Tenille Arts; Lindsay Ell; Robyn Ottolini; Meghan Patrick; MacKenzie Porter
Group or Duo of the Year	Interactive Artist or Group of the Year
The Reklaws; High Valley; Hunter Brothers; James Barker Band; Tim and the Glory Boys	Hailey Benedict; Aaron Goodvin; Hunter Brothers; James Barker Band; The Reklaws
Rising Star	Fans' Choice
Andrew Hyatt; Hailey Benedict; Nate Haller; Josh Ross; Sacha	Dallas Smith; Tenille Arts; Dean Brody; Jade Eagleson; High Valley; James Barker Band; Brett Kissel; Tyler Joe Miller; Robyn Ottolini; The Reklaws; Tenille Townes
Alternative Country Album of the Year	Single of the Year
Corb Lund, Songs My Friends Wrote; Jason Blaine, Diamonds in the Desert; Kyle McKearney, Down-Home; Twin Kennedy, Homebound; Stompin' Tom Connors, Unreleased Songs from the Vault Collection. Vol 4: Let's Smile Again	Tenille Townes, "Girl Who Didn't Care"; Jade Eagleson, "All Night to Figure It Out"; Aaron Goodvin, "Boy Like Me"; Brett Kissel, "Make a Life, Not a Living"; Jade Eagleson and Dean Brody, "More Drinkin' Than Fishin'"; James Barker Band, "Over All Over Again"; Shawn Austin feat. Chris Lane, "Tailgate to Heaven"
Songwriter of the Year	Video of the Year
Steph Jones, David Pramik, Tenille Townes — Tenille Townes, "Girl Who Didn't Care"; Will Bundy, MacKenzie Porter, Lydia Vaughan — MacKenzie Porter, "Pickup"; Matthew Cardinal, Doc de Groot, Jay Der, Jeff Dick, Mike Nash, Aaron Pollock, Chris Yurchuck — The Prairie States, "Rebel Phase"; Lindsay Ell, Jordan Schmidt, Geoffrey Warburton — Lindsay Ell, "Right on Time"; Monty Criswell, Tim Hicks, Deric Ruttan — Tim Hicks, "Whiskey Does"	Nice Horse, "High School"; Tenille Townes, "Girl Who Didn't Care"; Gord Bamford, "Heaven on Dirt"; Jade Eagleson and Dean Brody, "More Drinkin' Than Fishin'"; MacKenzie Porter, "Pickup"; Steven Lee Olsen, "Relationship Goals"; Tim Hicks, "Whiskey Does"
Top Selling Canadian Album of the Year	Top Selling Canadian Single of the Year
Jade Eagleson, Honkytonk Revival	The Reklaws and Sacha, "What the Truck"
Guitar Player of the Year	Bass Player of the Year
Matt McKay; Ryan Davidson; Tara McLeod; Chad Murphy; Brennan Wall	Brandi Sidoryk; Lisa Dodd; Justin Kudding; Mark Rynkun; Holt Stuart-Hitchcox
Steel Guitar Player of the Year	Drummer of the Year
Mitch Jay; Chris Altmann; Doug Johnson	Matthew Atkins; Spencer Cheyne; Flavio Cirillo; Rich DaSilva; Krista Wodelet
Fiddle Player of the Year	Keyboard Player of the Year
Denis Dufresne; Linsey Beckett; Tyler Beckett; Julie Kennedy; Mike Sanyshyn	Brendan Waters; Mike Little; Scott Wilkinson
Specialty Instrument Player of the Year	Top Selling International Album
Mitch Jay; Johnny Gasparic; Shane Guse; Connor Riddell; Katie Rox	Morgan Wallen, Dangerous: The Double Album

=== Radio ===
Radio Station of the Year, Large Market	Radio Station of the Year, Medium/Small Market
CFCW – Edmonton, AB; CHKX-FM – Hamilton, ON; CJJR-FM – Vancouver, BC; CJKX-FM – Oshawa, ON; CKKL-FM – Ottawa, ON	CHCQ-FM – Belleville, ON; CJXL-FM – Moncton, NB; CKDK-FM – Woodstock, ON; CKGY-FM – Red Deer, AB; CKLJ-FM – Olds, AB
Radio Personality of the Year
Paul Ferguson, CHCQ-FM; Wendy Boomer, CKBY-FM; Shannon Ella, Pure Country; Jason McCoy, Pure Country; Greg Shannon and Stella Stevens, CFCW

=== Industry ===
Booking Agency of the Year	Country Music Program or Special of the year
Sakamoto Agency; Action Entertainment Collaborative; The Feldman Agency; Invictus Entertainment Group; Paquin Artists Agency	Pure Country Top 50 of 2021; Christmas Time With Tenille Townes; A Kissel Country Christmas; The Road Less Travelled; Wise Woman, The Show
Management Company of the Year	Music Publishing Company of the Year
Starseed Entertainment; Big Loud Management; The Core Entertainment; Invictus Entertainment Group; MDM Artist Management Services	Anthem Entertainment; Big Loud Publishing; Sony ATV Music Publishing; Warner Chappell Music Canada
Record Company of the Year	Industry Person of the Year
Warner Music Canada; Big Loud Records; MDM Recordings Inc.; Sony Music Entertainment Canada Inc.; Universal Music Canada	Brianne Deslippe – Big Loud Records; Paul Biro – Sakamoto Agency; Steve Coady – Warner Music Canada; Mike Denney – MDM Recordings Inc.; Bobby Wills – Willing Entertainment
Creative Director(s) of the Year	Recording Studio of the Year
Austin Chaffe; Alee; Chris Cavill, Chris Doi, Kyle McKearney, Jeffrey Ojeda; Mitchell Nevins; Bronwin Parks	MCC Recording Studio; Barrytone Studios; Bart McKay Productions; OCL Studios; Revolution Recording
Record Producer of the Year	Retailer of the Year
Joey Moi — Dallas Smith, "Hide from a Broken Heart"; Dan Davidson — Hailey Benedict, "Wanted You To"; Danick Dupelle — Tyler Joe Miller, "Wild As Her"; Danick Dupelle, Tebey Ottoh — Tebey, "What Was I Drinking"; Deric Ruttan — Tim Hicks, "Whiskey Does"	Apple Music; Amazon Music; Spotify Canada Inc.
Talent Buyer or Promoter of the Year	Video Director of the Year
Paul Biro – Sakamoto Agency; Dan Clapson – Blue Jay Sessions; Jim Cressman – Invictus Entertainment Group; Brooke Dunford – Republic Live; Adam Oppenheim – Stampede Entertainment Inc.	Ben Knechtel — "More Drinkin' Than Fishin'" (Jade Eagleson & Dean Brody); "Pretty Please" (Sacha), "She Don't Know" (Jade Eagleson); "Somewhere to Drink" (Nate Haller, The Reklaws, Brett Kissel); "Trust Issues" (Robyn Ottolini); Stephano Barberis — "Best of Me" (Josh Ramsay feat. Dallas Smith); "Can’t Beat the View" (Chris Buck Band), "Rattlesnake Bite" (Kadooh); "Weather Man" (Danielle Ryan); Codi McIvor — "Grass Roots" (Drew Gregory); "If I Got You" (Jordyn Pollard), "Level Up" (Hailey Benedict), "Shittin’ in the Barn" (Drew Gregory); "When God Made Country Music" (Drew Gregory); Travis Nesbitt — "Chop Suey" (The Dead South); "Drink Along Song" (Gord Bamford); "People Are Strange" (The Dead South); "Soundtrack to the End of the World" (The Congregation); Ryan Nolan — "Had a Good Weekend" (Shantaia); "Let You" (Don Amero & Raquel Cole); "Our Days Are Numbered" (Five Roses); "The Highway" (Terri Clark); "Three Quarter Time" (Callie McCullough)
