= Do It Anyway =

Do It Anyway may refer to:

- Do It Anyway (album), 2023 album by Jade Eagleson
  - "Do It Anyway" (Jade Eagleson song), title song from the 2023 album
- "Do It Anyway" (Ben Folds Five song), 2012 single by Ben Folds Five from the album The Sound of the Life of the Mind
- "Do it anyway", paraphrase of The Paradoxical Commandments associated with Mother Teresa
