= Bruce County (From the Beginning) =

2024 album by Owen Riegling

Studio album by Owen Riegling
- Released: May 24, 2024 (EP); November 1, 2024 (album)
- Genre: Country
- Length: 19:17 (EP); 41:36 (album)
- Label: Universal Music Canada
- Producer: Brad Hill

Owen Riegling chronology
Empty Room (2020)	Bruce County (From the Beginning) (2024)	In the Feeling (2026)

Singles from Bruce County (From the Beginning)
- 1. "Love (The Sweater Song)" Released: June 23, 2023; 2. "Old Dirt Roads" Released: August 10, 2023; 3. "Moonshines" Released: August 5, 2024

"Bruce County" (EP)
- EP cover

Bruce County (From the Beginning) is the debut studio album by Canadian country music artist Owen Riegling. It was produced by Brad Hill and released on November 1, 2024, via Universal Music Canada. The album includes the singles "Love (The Sweater Song)", "Old Dirt Roads", and "Moonshines". It is an expansion of Riegling's extended play Bruce County, which was released on May 24, 2024. The EP won Album/EP of the Year at the 2025 Country Music Association of Ontario Awards, and the album won Album of the Year at the 2025 CCMA Awards.

== Background and release ==
In a press release announcing the Bruce County EP, Riegling stated "These songs mean a lot to me, they tell the story of where I'm from, how I was raised and make me feel right at home". He named the release after Bruce County, Ontario, where he grew up, and remarked that "Bruce County is as much a part of me as my last name". The four tracks included on the EP were all recorded in Nashville, Tennessee.

Bruce County (From the Beginning) included the four tracks from the EP, along with the totality of Riegling's original songs released on Universal Music Canada, and one new track "The Call".

== Track listing ==
Bruce County
No.	Title	Writer(s)	Length
1.	"Moonshines"	Owen Riegling; Daryl Scott; Jesse Slack	3:44
2.	"Dan"	Riegling; Scott; Slack	5:02
3.	"Bud Light the Way"	Riegling	3:10
4.	"Old Dirt Roads"	Riegling	3:48
5.	"Dan - Single Version"	Riegling; Scott; Slack	3:32
Total length:			19:17

Bruce County (From the Beginning)
No.	Title	Writer(s)	Length
1.	"Moonshines"	Owen Riegling; Daryl Scott; Jesse Slack	3:44
2.	"Home Less"	Riegling; Scott; Slack	3:28
3.	"In My Head Again"	Riegling; Dave Sampson	4:12
4.	"Weekend You"	Riegling; Aaron Pollock; Lydia Sutherland	3:37
5.	"Bud Light the Way"	Riegling	3:10
6.	"Love (The Sweater Song)"	Riegling	2:47
7.	"Church"	Riegling; Scott; Slack	3:31
8.	"Old Dirt Roads"	Riegling	3:48
9.	"A Part of Me"	Riegling	3:15
10.	"Dan"	Riegling; Sampson; Scott	5:02
11.	"The Call"	Riegling	4:59
Total length:			41:36

== Personnel ==
Credits adapted from AllMusic.

- Austin Addams – guitar
- Rich Brinsfield – bass, bass guitar
- Mike Cervantes – master engineering
- Jeff Coggins – guitar
- Jim Cooley – mixing
- Tim Denbo – bass, bass guitar
- David Dorn – keyboards
- Andy Ellison – steel guitar
- Tim Galloway – guitar
- Brad Hill – master engineering, production, programming, recording
- Will Houchens – keyboards
- Billy Justineau – keyboards
- Nathan Keeterle – guitar
- Troy Keller – background vocals
- Matt King – drums
- Phil Lawson – drums
- Sol Littlefield – electric guitar, guitar
- Mike Melancon – drums
- Carl Miner – acoustic guitar, banjo, guitar
- Juma Molina – banjo
- Kristian Montano – master engineering
- Jordan Orbek – mixing
- Justin Ostrander – guitar
- Riley Owens – assistant engineer
- Owen Riegling – background vocals, bass guitar, drums, guitar, mixing, primary vocals, production, programming, recording
- Kristen Rogers – background vocals
- Scotty Sanders – pedal steel, steel guitar
- Jimmy Thow – background vocals, banjo, bass guitar, producer, programming, recording

== Charts ==
=== Singles ===
Title	Year	Peak chart positions		Certifications
Title	Year	CAN	CAN Country	Certifications
"Love (The Sweater Song)"	2023	—	29	
"Old Dirt Roads"	2023	69	2	MC: Platinum
"Moonshines"	2024	94	2	
"—" denotes releases that did not chart

== Accolades ==
Year	Association	Category	Nominated work	Result	Ref
2024	Country Music Association of Ontario	Single of the Year	"Old Dirt Roads"	Nominated	
2024	Canadian Country Music Association	Songwriter(s) of the Year	"Old Dirt Roads"	Won	
2025	Country Music Association of Ontario	Album/EP of the Year	Bruce County	Won	
2025	Country Music Association of Ontario	Music Video of the Year	"Moonshines"	Nominated	
2025	Country Music Association of Ontario	Single of the Year	"Moonshines"	Won	
2025	Country Music Association of Ontario	Songwriter(s) of the Year	"Moonshines"	Won	
2025	Canadian Country Music Association	Album of the Year	Bruce County (From the Beginning)	Won	
2025	Canadian Country Music Association	Single of the Year	"Moonshines"	Nominated	
2025	Canadian Country Music Association	Songwriter(s) of the Year	"Moonshines"	Nominated	

== Release history ==
Release formats for Bruce County
Country	Date	Format	Label	Ref.
Various	May 24, 2024	Digital download	Universal Music Canada	
Various	May 24, 2024	Streaming	Universal Music Canada	

Release formats for Bruce County (From the Beginning)
Country	Date	Format	Label	Ref.
Various	November 1, 2024	Digital download	Universal Music Canada	
Various	November 1, 2024	Streaming	Universal Music Canada	
Various	November 8, 2024	CD	Universal Music Canada	
Various	November 8, 2024	Vinyl	Universal Music Canada	
