= Do It Anyway (Jade Eagleson song) =

2024 single by Jade Eagleson

Single by Jade Eagleson with Jake Worthington
- Released: July 19, 2024
- Genre: Country; traditional country
- Length: 2:52 (solo version): 2:50 (collaborative version)
- Label: Starseed
- Songwriters: Ashley Gorley; Chase McGill; Matt Jenkins
- Producer: Todd Clark

Jade Eagleson singles chronology
"Telluride" (2024)	"Do It Anyway" (2024)	"Worth the Double" (2025)

Acoustic Performance Video
- "Do It Anyway" on YouTube

"Do It Anyway" is a song recorded by Canadian country music artist Jade Eagleson. The song was written by Ashley Gorley, Chase McGill, and Matt Jenkins, while Todd Clark produced the track. The solo version of the song was the title track on Eagleson's 2023 album Do It Anyway, while a re-recorded version with American country artist Jake Worthington was released as a single to Canadian country radio in 2024.

== Background ==
While Eagleson did not write the song, he stated that it "deeply resonates" with him, and that he felt as though it was written about him. Eagleson stated that he "grew up always being country and being very true to that even though a lot of people made fun of that back in the day, but it’s cool now, which is awesome". Eagleson described the writers of the song, Ashley Gorley, Chase McGill, and Matt Jenkins, as "legends", calling it an "added bonus" to be able to record a song of theirs.

In a press release, Jake Worthington remarked that it was an "easy yes" when Eagleson asked him to join on a new version of the song, stating that he was an Eagleson's style of music, which Worthington termed "good ole country music". Eagleson told Beatroute that he was "really excited" to have Worthington on the song, as they shared a similar rural background.

== Critical reception ==
Mary Claire Crabtree of Whiskey Riff opined that Eagleson and Worthington are "two of the smoothest voices in country music", and referred to "Do It Anyway" as a "magical duet" that is a "nod to old-school traditions". Madeleine O'Connell of Country Now stated that Eagleson "couldn't have selected a better duet partner than Worthington", noting how both artists have "built a career on staying true to themselves in their music".

An uncredited review from Country Evolution called "Do It Anyway" described the original solo version as a "classic honky-tonk anthem that showcases Eagleson’s powerful vocals and prowess". The author also spoke positively about the use of the fiddle in the song, while opining that "Eagleson and Worthington’s voices blend seamlessly, creating a rich and harmonious sound that evokes the classic country duets of the 90s".

== Live performance ==
Eagleson and Worthington performed "Do It Anyway" at the 2024 Canadian Country Music Awards at Rogers Place in Edmonton, Alberta. The show was broadcast live by the CTV Television Network in Canada, and their performance was later uploaded to YouTube.

== Accolades ==
Year	Association	Category	Result	Ref
2025	Canadian Country Music Association	Musical Collaboration of the Year	Nominated	

== Music video ==
The official visualizer for the solo version of "Do It Anyway" was directed by Austin Chaffe and premiered on September 29, 2023. Eagleson and Worthington filmed an acoustic performance of their collaborative version, and it premiered on October 7, 2024.

== Charts ==
Chart performance for "Do It Anyway"
Chart (2024)	Peak position
Australia Country Hot 50 (The Music)	27
Canada Country (Mediabase)	5
