= 2025 Canadian Country Music Association Awards =

Annual Canadian country music award ceremony

- Date: September 13, 2025
- Venue: Prospera Place; Kelowna, British Columbia
- Hosted by: Tom Green
- Most wins: Josh Ross (5)
- Most nominations: Brett Kissel; Josh Ross; Cameron Whitcomb; (6 each)

Television/radio coverage
- Network: CTV

The 2025 Canadian Country Music Association Awards, honouring achievements in Canadian country music, were presented on September 13, 2025, at Prospera Place in Kelowna, British Columbia. For the third year in a row, they were broadcast by CTV over its television network, website, and mobile app.

The ceremony was hosted by Canadian comedian and actor Tom Green. The performers were Cameron Whitcomb, Madeline Merlo and Tyler Joe Miller, Dallas Smith with Alexandra Kay, Sacha with Restless Road, Thelma & James, Jade Eagleson, Noeline Hofmann, James Barker Band, Meghan Patrick, and Josh Ross.

Nominees were announced by the CCMA on July 17. Josh Ross, Cameron Whitcomb, and Brett Kissel tied for the most nominations with six each.

This year marks the first in which the Francophone Artist of the Year Award was presented to a solo act, duo, or group that performs and records primarily in the French language. The majority of awards were handed out at the CCMA Music Industry Gala Dinner & Awards on September 12, 2025, with the remaining eight awards being reserved for the television broadcast.

== Nominees and winners ==
=== Artist ===
Entertainer of the Year	Album of the Year
Josh Ross; Jade Eagleson; MacKenzie Porter; Owen Riegling; Cameron Whitcomb	Owen Riegling, Bruce County (From the Beginning); Matt Lang, All Night Longer; Tyler Joe Miller, Going Home; Meghan Patrick, Golden Child; Brett Kissel, Let Your Horses Run – The Album
Male Artist of the Year	Female Artist of the Year
Jade Eagleson; Brett Kissel; Tyler Joe Miller; Josh Ross; Cameron Whitcomb	MacKenzie Porter; Hailey Benedict; Madeline Merlo; Jess Moskaluke; Sacha
Francophone Artist of the Year	Group or Duo of the Year
Salebarbes; Francis Degrandpré; Fred Dionne; Sara Dufour; Vince Lemire	James Barker Band; High Valley; The Reklaws; Tim and the Glory Boys; The Washboard Union
Breakthrough Artist or Group of the Year	Fans' Choice
Cameron Whitcomb; Noeline Hofmann; Zach McPhee; Sacha; Tony Stevens	Cameron Whitcomb; Jade Eagleson; High Valley; Brett Kissel; Tyler Joe Miller; MacKenzie Porter; Owen Riegling; The Reklaws; Josh Ross; Dallas Smith
Single of the Year	Musical Collaboration of the Year
Josh Ross, "Single Again"; The Reklaws, "I Grew Up on a Farm"; Brett Kissel, "Let Your Horses Run"; Owen Riegling, "Moonshines"; Cameron Whitcomb, "Quitter"	Madeline Merlo feat. Dustin Lynch, "Broken Heart Thing"; Jade Eagleson feat. Jake Worthington, "Do It Anyway"; Meghan Patrick with Caitlyn Smith, "Stoned Alone"; Josh Ross feat. Julia Michaels, "Want This Beer"; Dan Davidson with Tim Hicks and Max Jackson, "Won't Forget"; Dean Brody with James Barker Band, "Your Mama Would Hate Me"
Songwriter of the Year	Video of the Year
Kelly Archer, Travis Denning, Chris Stevens — "I'm Gonna Love You" (Cody Johnson and Carrie Underwood); Elizabeth Lowell Boland, Beyoncé, Ryan Beatty, Terius “The-Dream” Gesteelde-Diamant, Leven Kali, Shawntoni Ajanae Nichols, Raphael Saadiq — "Bodyguard" (Beyoncé); Ben Cottrill, David Schaeman, Nolan Sipe, Cameron Whitcomb — "Quitter" (Cameron Whitcomb); Madeline Merlo, Zach Crowell, Lalo Guzman, James McNair, Michael Tyler — "Broken Heart Thing" (Madeline Merlo feat. Dustin Lynch); Owen Riegling, Daryl Scott, Jesse Slack — "Moonshines" (Owen Riegling)	Josh Ross, "Single Again"; Sacha, "Hey Mom I Made It"; Brett Kissel, "Let Your Horses Run"; Jess Moskaluke, "Life for Me"; Alli Walker, "Ride It Out"
Alternative Country Album of the Year	Top Selling Canadian Single of the Year
Jake Vaadeland, One More Dollar to Go; Wyatt C. Louis, Chandler; Noeline Hofmann, Purple Gas; Riley Taylor, Story to Tell; Kyle McKearney, To the River	Josh Ross, "Single Again"
Top Selling Canadian Album of the Year	Top Selling Album of the Year
Josh Ross, Complicated	Post Malone, F-1 Trillion

=== Musician ===
Bass Player of the Year	Drummer Player of the Year
Lisa Dodd; Ben Miller; Lisa Jacobs; Brandi Sidoryk; Holt Stuart-Hitchcox	Rich DaSilva; Matt Atkins; Flavio Cirillo; Brendan Lyons; Joseph Poulin; Greg Williamson
Fiddle Player of the Year	Guitar of the Year
Tyler Beckett; Linsey Beckett; Denis Dufresne; Jesse Grandmont; Catherine Robertson	Chris Bray; Russell Broom; Ryan Davidson; Marcus Ramsay; Brennan Wall
Keyboard Player of the Year	Specialty Instrument Player of the Year
Brendan Waters; Ben Cottrill; Matt Koebel; Brendon Schmidt	Tyler Vollrath; Denis Dufresne; Johnny Gasparic; Shane Guse
Steel Guitar Player of the Year
Matt McKay; Michael Eckert; Bruce Hoffman; Kevin Neal; Marcus Ramsay

=== Radio ===
Radio Station of the Year, Large Market	Radio Station of the Year, Medium/Small Market
CFCW — Edmonton, Alberta; CHKX-FM — Hamilton, Ontario; CISN-FM — Edmonton, Alberta; CJJR-FM — Vancouver, British Columbia; CKKL-FM — Ottawa, Ontario	CIGV-FM — Kelowna, British Columbia; CFCH-FM — North Bay, Ontario; CHAT-FM — Medicine Hat, Alberta; CHCQ-FM — Belleville, Ontario; CICX-FM — Orillia, Ontario

=== Industry ===
Booking Agency of the Year	Country Club of the Year
Paquin Entertainment Group; Action Entertainment Group; Fame Group Agency; The Feldman Agency; Invictus Entertainment Group	The King Eddy — Calgary, Alberta; Cook County Saloon — Edmonton, Alberta; Ranchman's Cookhouse and Dancehall — Calgary, Alberta
Country Festival, Fair or Exhibition of the Year	Country Music Program or Special of the Year
Boots and Hearts Music Festival — Oro-Medonte, Ontario; Big Valley Jamboree — Camrose, Alberta; Calgary Stampede — Calgary, Alberta; Cavendish Beach Music Festival — Cavendish, Prince Edward Island; LASSO Montreal — Montreal, Quebec	Pure Country Top 50 Countdown (iHeartRadio Canada); Heartstrings & Honkytonks (CFCW & SILVERFLOW Productions); A Kane Brown Christmas Special (Sony Music Entertainment Canada Inc.); A Kissel Country Christmas (Brett Kissel, Abbey White); On the Porch with Front Porch Music (Front Porch Music)
Management Company of the Year	Music Publishing Company of the Year
The Core Entertainment; MDM Artist Management Services; RLive Management; Starseed Entertainment; Willing Entertainment	Anthem Entertainment Group; Big Loud Publishing; Sony Music Publishing; Universal Music Publishing; Warner Chappell Music Canada
Record Company of the Year	Industry Person of the Year
Universal Music Canada; Big Loud Records; Sony Music Entertainment (Canada) Inc.; Starseed Records; Willing Records	Lindsay Hyslop (BBR Music Group); Justin Clark (Big Loud Records); Warren Copnick (Sony Music Entertainment (Canada) Inc); Joelle Proulx (Agence Ranch); Kevin White (Universal Music Canada)
Creative Team or Director of the Year	Recording Studio of the Year
Stephane Lamontagne, JF Galipeau; Robert Adam, Bryan Francisco, Brandynn L.P, Alyssa Gibson (Duotone Studio); Austin Chaffe; Kyle McKearney, Jeff Ojeda, Roberta Landreth; Connor Scheffler, Andrew Parry	Revolution Recording — Toronto, Ontario; 80A Studios — Toronto, Ontario; Manicdown Studios — Vancouver, British Columbia; MCC Recording Studio — Calgary, Alberta; OCL Studios — Chestermere, Alberta
Record Producer of the Year	Retailer or Commercial Platform of the Year
Joey Moi — Quit!! (Hardy); Russell Broom, Kyle McKearney – To The River (Kyle McKearney); Danick Dupelle — All Night Longer (Matt Lang); Karen Kosowski — "First Time Living" (Alli Walker) and "Whether You Love Me or Not" (Meghan Patrick); Dan Swinimer — "He's the One" (Savannah Jade) and "When I Hear That Song" (Tony Stevens)	SiriusXM Canada; Amazon Music; Apple Music; Spotify Canada Inc.
Talent Buyer or Promoter of the Year	Country Personality(ies) of the Year
Denise Ross (Live Nation Entertainment); Paul Biro (Sakamoto Agency); Jim Cressman (Invictus Entertainment Group); Brooke Dunford (Republic Live); Adam Oppenheim (Stampede Entertainment)	Jason McCoy (CICX-FM); Dan Davidson & Stella Stevens (CFCW); Tracy Lynn (CFWC-FM); Sam McDaid (CIKZ-FM); Paul McGuire (CFXJ-FM)
Video Director of the Year	Innovative Campaign of the Year
Ben Knechtel — "Outliving" (The Reklaws), "Remind Me Again" (Zach McPhee), "Youth" (Sully Burrows); Gord Bamford, Codi McIvor — "Just Getting Started" (Gord Bamford); Alexandre Blais, Alexandre Charron — "He's the One" (Savannah Jade); Travis Nesbitt — "Won't Forget" (Dan Davidson, Tim Hicks & Max Jackson); Alex P. Smith — "You Didn't Hear It From Me" (James Barker Band)	Outliving (For Mom) EP Launch Campaign — The Reklaws, Starseed Entertainment; "Wheels of Steel"- A Cross Canada Journey on the Open Rails — Cameron Nickerson; "Golden Child: The Making Of" — Meghan Patrick; "SOUTHERN DRAW(L)" The Broadway Interviews — Paige Penney and W/FRNDS; "Ride It Out" – A Cultural Moment, Not Just a Song — Alli Walker
Gary Slaight Music Humanitarian Award
Craig Senyk

== Performances ==
Performer(s)	Song
James Barker Band	"Somebody I Know"
Tom Green	"Get Er Done Tonight"
Madeline Merlo; Tyler Joe Miller	"Broken Heart Thing"
Jade Eagleson	"Worth the Double"
Thelma & James	"Happy Ever After You"
Meghan Patrick	"Golden Child"
Dallas Smith; Alexandra Kay	"How Do You Miss Me"
Noeline Hofmann	"Purple Gas"
Sacha; Restless Road	"Shooting Star"
Josh Ross	"Hate How You Look"
Cameron Whitcomb	"Quitter"

== See also ==
- 2025 in Canadian music
- 2025 in country music
