= Outta Yours =

2023 song by Steven Lee Olsen

Single by Steven Lee Olsen
- Released: January 27, 2023
- Genre: Country
- Length: 2:58
- Label: Universal Canada; The Core
- Songwriter(s): Corey Crowder; Brandon Day; Steven Lee Olsen
- Producer(s): Brandon Day; Steven Lee Olsen

Steven Lee Olsen singles chronology
"Nashville or Nothing" (2022)	"Outta Yours" (2023)	"Out Here" (2023)

Visualizer
- "Outta Yours" on YouTube

"Outta Yours" is a song recorded by Canadian country music artist Steven Lee Olsen. He co-wrote the song with Corey Crowder and Brandon Day, while he also co-produced it with Day.

== Background ==
Olsen and his frequent collaborators Brandon Day and Corey Crowder wrote "Outta Yours" while on a writing retreat in Georgia. It was the first song the trio wrote, and Olsen believed it was a "standout".

== Live performance ==
Olsen performed a live acoustic rendition of "Outta Yours" at the studio of CJJR-FM in Vancouver, during a stop on the Old Dominion "No Bad Vibes Tour", where he was an opening act.

== Music video ==
Olsen released a visualizer for "Outta Yours" on January 26, 2023.

== Accolades ==
Year	Association	Category	Result	Ref
2024	Canadian Country Music Association	Single of the Year	Nominated	

== Credits and personnel ==
Credits adapted from AllMusic.

- Jim Cooley – mixing
- Corey Crowder – composition
- Nathan Dantzler – master engineering
- Brandon Day – composition, guitar, production, programming, recording
- Miles McPherson – drums
- Steven Lee Olsen – composition, primary vocals, production
- Alex Wright – keyboard

== Track listings ==
Digital download – single

1. "Outta Yours" – 2:59

Digital download – single

1. "Outta Yours" (acoustic) – 3:15
2. "Outta Yours" – 2:59

== Charts ==
"Outta Yours" peaked at number five on the Canada Country chart for the week of July 29, 2023. It also peaked at number 86 on the Canadian Hot 100 for the same week, and was Olsen's first appearance on the all-genre chart since "Raised by a Good Time" in 2015.

Chart performance for "Outta Yours"
Chart (2023)	Peak position
Canada (Canadian Hot 100)	86
Canada Country (Billboard)	5

== Certifications ==
Certifications for "Outta Yours"
Region	Certification	Certified units/sales
Canada (Music Canada)	Gold	40,000^{‡}
^{‡} Sales+streaming figures based on certification alone.
