= What You're Made Of =

What You're Made Of may refer to:

- What You're Made Of (Lucie Silvas song), 2004
- What You're Made Of (Lindsey Stirling song), 2020
- What You're Made Of, a song by Steven Lee Olsen from the EP Relationship Goals
