= Relationship Goals =

Relationship Goals may refer to:

- "Relationship Goals" (song), 2021 Steven Lee Olsen song
- Relationship Goals (film), a 2026 American romantic comedy
- "Relationship Goals" (Grand Army), television episode
