= Owen Riegling =

Canadian country singer-songwriter

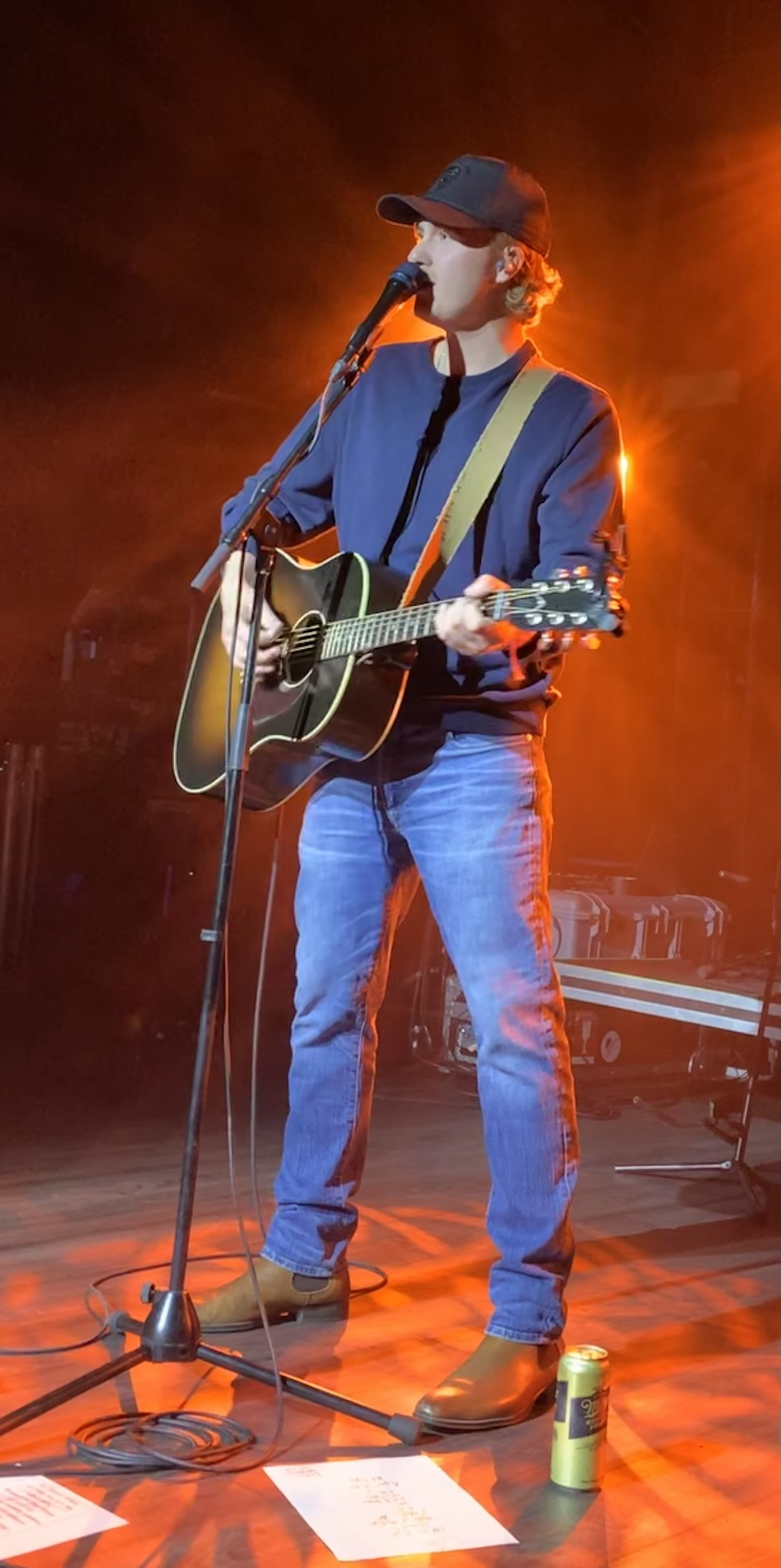
- Riegling performing in 2022

Background information
- Born: Owen Michael Riegling; 1998 or 1999 (age 27–28)
- Origin: Mildmay, Ontario, Canada
- Genres: Country; country rock; traditional country
- Occupation: Singer-songwriter
- Instruments: Guitar, vocals
- Years active: 2019–present
- Labels: Big Loud; Universal Music Canada
- Website: Official website

Owen Michael Riegling (born 1998) is a Canadian country music singer and songwriter. He is currently signed to Universal Music Canada and Big Loud Records. He has charted multiple singles including "Old Dirt Roads", "Moonshines", "Taillight This Town", and "Love Hate Love". He released his debut album Bruce County (From the Beginning) in 2024. His second album In the Feeling was released in April 2026.

== Early life ==
Riegling grew up on a 100-acre farm in Mildmay, Ontario. He began playing the guitar at eleven years old, after receiving one as a Christmas gift. He performed for the first time as part of his guitar teacher Roger Williamson's band, before progressing to play covers of Eric Church songs at local venues. Riegling initially attended business school after high school, but realized he enjoyed playing music more. He elected to attend the Ontario Institute of Audio Recording Technology for music production, after he had won a free recording session in a contest.

== Career ==
In July 2019, Riegling independently released the song "Smoke Man". The song was included on his debut extended play Empty Room, which was released on September 4, 2020. In August 2022, Riegling won the Boots and Hearts Emerging Artist Showcase contest, securing him a single release with Universal Music Canada, songwriting sessions, and a trip to Nashville.

In June 2023, Riegling signed a record deal with Universal Music Canada and released his debut radio single "Love (The Sweater Song)". He was also nominated for "Rising Star" at the CMA Ontario Awards. In August 2023, Riegling released the song "Old Dirt Roads", which later became his second single at Canadian country radio. In October 2023, he was an opening act for American country artist Tyler Hubbard on his solo headlining tour in Canada. Later that fall, Riegling joined Robyn Ottolini as the opening act for the Canadian dates on her "All My Friends Are Hot Tour". In 2024, he joined Chase Rice's "Get Western Tour" as an opening act for most of the Canadian dates. On May 24, 2024, Riegling released the extended play Bruce County, which included the single "Moonshines". He was nominated in four categories at the 2024 Canadian Country Music Awards, and won Breakthrough Artist of the Year and Songwriter of the Year. In the late fall of 2024, Riegling embarked on his debut headling tour across Canada, "The Old Dirt Road Trip". He released his debut album Bruce County (From the Beginning) on November 1, 2024.

In August 2025, Riegling signed a U.S. record deal with Big Loud Records, in conjunction with Universal Music Canada. He released the single "Taillight This Town" in October 2025. Riegling released his second album In the Feeling on April 17, 2026. The album included the single "Love Hate Love". He will support the album with his headlining "In the Feeling Tour" with twenty-six dates across Canada and the United States in the summer and fall of 2026.

== Personal life ==
Riegling married his longtime girlfriend Liv in 2024.

== Tours ==
- Buckle Up Tour (2024)
- The Old Dirt Road Trip (2024)
- In the Feeling Tour (2026)

== Discography ==
=== Studio albums ===
List of albums, with selected details
Title	Details
Bruce County (From the Beginning)	Release date: November 1, 2024; Label: Universal Music Canada; Format: CD, vinyl, digital download, streaming
In the Feeling	Release date: April 17, 2026; Label: Universal Music Canada / Big Loud Records; Format: CD, vinyl, digital download, streaming

=== Extended plays ===
List of EPs, with selected details
Title	Details
Empty Room	Release date: September 4, 2020; Label: Independent; Format: Digital download, streaming
Bruce County	Release date: May 24, 2024; Label: Universal Music Canada; Format: Digital download, streaming

=== Singles ===
==== As lead artist ====
List of singles, with selected peak chart positions
Title	Year	Peak chart positions		Certifications	Album
Title	Year	CAN	CAN Country	Certifications	Album
"Love (The Sweater Song)"	2023	—	29		Bruce County (From the Beginning)
"Old Dirt Roads"	2023	69	2	MC: 2× Platinum	Bruce County (From the Beginning)
"Moonshines"	2024	94	2	MC: Platinum	Bruce County (From the Beginning)
"Taillight This Town"	2025	60	8		In the Feeling
"Love Hate Love"	2026	51	4		In the Feeling
"Me Without My Hometown"	2026	80	18		In the Feeling
"—" denotes releases that did not chart

==== As featured artist ====
Title	Year	Artist	Peak chart positions		Album
Title	Year	Artist	CAN Country	UK Country	Album
"Coming Home to You (Bigger Houses)"	2024	MacKenzie Porter	12	25	Non-album single

=== Music videos ===
List of music videos
Title	Year	Director
"Love (The Sweater Song)"	2023	Ryan Nolan
"Home Less"	2024	Connor Scheffler
"In My Head Again"	2024	Connor Scheffler
"Moonshines"	2024	Connor Scheffler

== Awards and nominations ==
List of awards and nominations received by Owen Riegling
Year	Association	Category	Nominated work	Result	Ref
2023	Country Music Association of Ontario	Rising Star	—N/a	Nominated	
2024	Country Music Association of Ontario	Breakthrough Artist of the Year	—N/a	Won	
2024	Country Music Association of Ontario	Male Artist of the Year	—N/a	Won	
2024	Country Music Association of Ontario	Single of the Year	"Old Dirt Roads"	Nominated	
2024	Canadian Country Music Association	Breakthrough Artist or Group of the Year	—N/a	Won	
2024	Canadian Country Music Association	Entertainer of the Year	—N/a	Nominated	
2024	Canadian Country Music Association	Male Artist of the Year	—N/a	Nominated	
2024	Canadian Country Music Association	Songwriter(s) of the Year	"Old Dirt Roads"	Won	
2025	Juno Awards	Breakthrough Artist or Group of the Year	—N/a	Nominated	
2025	Country Music Association of Ontario	Album/EP of the Year	Bruce County	Won	
2025	Country Music Association of Ontario	Fans' Choice	—N/a	Won	
2025	Country Music Association of Ontario	Male Artist of the Year	—N/a	Won	
2025	Country Music Association of Ontario	Music Video of the Year	"Moonshines"	Nominated	
2025	Country Music Association of Ontario	Single of the Year	"Moonshines"	Won	
2025	Country Music Association of Ontario	Songwriter(s) of the Year	"Moonshines" (with Daryl Scott, Jesse Slack)	Won	
2025	Canadian Country Music Association	Album of the Year	Bruce County (From the Beginning)	Won	
2025	Canadian Country Music Association	Entertainer of the Year	—N/a	Nominated	
2025	Canadian Country Music Association	Fans' Choice	—N/a	Nominated	
2025	Canadian Country Music Association	Single of the Year	"Moonshines"	Nominated	
2025	Canadian Country Music Association	Songwriter(s) of the Year	"Moonshines" (with Daryl Scott, Jesse Slack)	Nominated	
