= She Don't Know =

2022 single by Jade Eagleson

Single by Jade Eagleson

from the album Honkytonk Revival
- Released: January 30, 2022
- Genre: Country
- Length: 3:24
- Label: Starseed
- Songwriters: James Barker; Jonathan Singleton; Travis Wood
- Producers: Todd Clark; Travis Wood

Jade Eagleson singles chronology
"More Drinkin' Than Fishin'" (2021)	"She Don't Know" (2022)	"Shakin' in Them Boots" (2022)

Music video
- "She Don't Know" on YouTube

"She Don't Know" is a song recorded by Canadian country artist Jade Eagleson. The song was written by James Barker, Jonathan Singleton, and Travis Wood, while Wood produced the track with Todd Clark. It is the third single from his second album Honkytonk Revival.

== Background ==
Eagleson stated that when he was finishing up Honkytonk Revival, he realized he hadn't included a love song on the album. He decided to include "She Don't Know", saying "the lyrics in it are what really hit me because my love language isn’t words," adding "I might clean the kitchen and I’ll think that’s romantic, in my mind. So, when I heard this, I just had to sing this one". He said that he can "relate to this song on a very human level".

== Critical reception ==
Cal Gratton of CJVR FM said that "She Don't Know" is a song that "gives a voice to all the quiet, stoic lovers," noting Eagleson's "smooth vocals" that "clearly articulates the love he holds for his wife". Natalli Amato of The Boot referred to the song as a "heartfelt love song" that shows Eagleson is "on track to make his mark on mainstream country music". She stated that he "retains his originality" with a "stripped-down, classic country sound" that is also "reminiscent of Luke Combs". Kim Hughes of Parton and Pearl stated that the track "boasts clever wordplay" and "[frames] Eagleson’s booming, bracing baritone in tender sentiment". Nanci Dagg of Canadian Beats Media said that Eagleson "has pulled out all the stops for couples around the world to celebrate their love for one another" with the release of "She Don't Know".

== Commercial performance ==
"She Don't Know" reached a peak of number one on the Billboard Canada Country chart for the week dated June 4, 2022. It marked Eagleson's third consecutive chart-topper, and fourth overall. This makes Eagleson the first male Canadian country artist to land three consecutive number ones off his second studio album, and only the second Canadian ever to achieve this feat after Shania Twain. The song also peaked at number 57 on the Canadian Hot 100 for the same week, surpassing Eagleson's previous career high mark set by "All Night to Figure It Out in 2021. It has been certified Platinum by Music Canada.

== Music video ==
The official music video for "She Don't Know" premiered on People.com on April 26, 2022. It features Eagleson, his wife Marina, and their son Levi. The video was directed by Ben Knechtel, and was shot entirely on iPhones. Eagleson also released a video of himself performing "She Don't Know" live from the farm he grew up on in Bailieboro, Ontario alongside guitarists Ben Miller and Chris Bray.

== Accolades ==
Year	Association	Category	Result	Ref
2023	Country Music Association of Ontario	Single of the Year	Nominated	
2023	Canadian Country Music Association	Video of the Year	Nominated	

== Charts ==
Chart performance for "She Don't Know"
Chart (2022)	Peak position
Canada (Canadian Hot 100)	57
Canada Country (Billboard)	1

== Certifications ==
Region	Certification	Certified units/sales
Canada (Music Canada)	Platinum	80,000^{‡}
^{‡} Sales+streaming figures based on certification alone.
