= Do It Anyway (album) =

2023 studio album by Jade Eagleson

Studio album by Jade Eagleson
- Released: September 29, 2023
- Genre: Country; neotraditional country
- Length: 41:15
- Label: Starseed
- Producer: Chris Bray; Todd Clark; Ben Miller; Travis Wood

Jade Eagleson chronology
Honkytonk Revival (2021)	Do It Anyway (2023)

Singles from Do It Anyway
- 1. "Shakin' in Them Boots" Released: August 5, 2022; 2. "Rodeo Queen" Released: March 11, 2023; 3. "Telluride" Released: January 8, 2024

Do It Anyway is the third studio album by Canadian country music artist Jade Eagleson. It was produced by Todd Clark, Chris Bray, and Ben Miller, and was released via Starseed Records on September 27, 2023. The album includes the singles "Shakin' in Them Boots", "Rodeo Queen", and "Telluride". It won Album of the Year at the 2024 Canadian Country Music Awards.

== Background and content ==
Eagleson stated that "putting this album out is equal parts terrifying and unbelievably rewarding, because it's a collection of songs that really share who I am at my core". He remarked that it was a dream come true to have Musicians Hall of Fame inductees Paul Franklin and Brent Mason play on the album, and that all of the session players "really complemented the sound of this record".

Eagleson chose to re-record a new version of his song "Still Gonna Be You" from his debut album, as well as a country music cover of the 2014 One Direction pop hit "Steal My Girl" for Do It Anyway. The album's release was preceded by its two lead radio singles, and the promotional singles "Honky Talkin'" and "Neon Dreamin'". Eagleson's longtime collaborator Todd Clark produced every track on the album except "Steal My Girl", which was produced by Eagleson's band members Chris Bray and Ben Miller. Performance credits on the track include Kevin "The General" Neal on pedal steel and dobro, Rich Da Silva on drums, and Linsey Beckett on fiddle.

== Critical reception ==
James Daykin of Entertainment Focus favourably reviewed the album, referring to it as a "harmonious blend of contemporary and timeless elements," adding that it "delves into life's fundamental aspects: love, family, and personal development". He noted a similar feel to the music of Brooks and Dunn and Dierks Bentley, while opining that Eagleson has "an old soul and a glittering career ahead". An uncredited review from All Country News stated that "from barn burners, tender moments to a reimagined One Direction cover, this album has something for every country fan". The review highlighted "A Lot in a Little Town" as a "career maker", while also noting that the album has a "balance between old school traditionalism with modern storylines". Mary Claire Crabtree of Whiskey Riff favorably reviewed Do It Anyway, calling it "a well-rounded album that you won't want to skip through", while noting it "is filled with fiddle riffs, steel guitar, some light-hearted tracks, and also a few serious lyrics". She also stated that the album "shows that Eagleson is ready to hang with the big dogs of country music".

== Track listing ==
No.	Title	Writer(s)	Length
1.	"Neon Dreamin'"	Dylan Guthro; Kelly Archer; Gordie Sampson	3:27
2.	"Shakin' in Them Boots"	Jacob Durrett; Blake Pendergrass; James Barker	2:49
3.	"Telluride"	Pendergrass; John Pierce; Travis Wood	3:04
4.	"Still Gonna Be You (Jade's Version)"	Wood; Jade Eagleson; Todd Clark; Gavin Slate	3:24
5.	"A Lot in a Little Town"	Wood; Summer Overstreet; Jacob Davis	2:58
6.	"Whiskey Around It"	Eagleson; Clark; Wood	3:06
7.	"Do It Anyway"	Chase McGill; Matt Jenkins; Ashley Gorley	2:52
8.	"Rodeo Queen"	Eagleson; Daryl Scott	3:02
9.	"Steal My Girl"	Wayne Hector; John Ryan; Ed Drewett; Julian Bunetta; Louis Tomlinson; Liam Payne	3:48
10.	"Some Cowboy"	Eagleson; Derek Bahr; Dave Sampson	2:47
11.	"Honky Talkin'"	Joe Fox; Griffen Palmer; Geoff Warburton	2:53
12.	"Coulda Fooled Me"	Eagleson; Clark; Wood	3:20
13.	"That's What Love Looks Like"	Larry Fleet; Will Bundy	3:41
Total length:			41:15

== Charts ==
=== Singles ===
Chart performance for singles from Do It Anyway
Year	Single	Peak positions		Certifications
Year	Single	CAN Country	CAN	Certifications
2022	"Shakin' in Them Boots"	2	94	MC: Platinum
2023	"Rodeo Queen"	5	—	MC: Gold
2024	"Telluride"	2	—	
"—" denotes releases that did not chart

=== Promotional singles ===
Year	Single
2023	"Honky Talkin'"
2023	"Neon Dreamin'"

== Release history ==
Release formats for Do It Anyway
Country	Date	Format	Label	Ref.
Various	September 29, 2023	Digital download	Starseed Records	
Various	September 29, 2023	Streaming	Starseed Records	

== Awards and nominations ==
Year	Association	Category	Nominated work	Result	Ref.
2024	Juno Awards	Country Album of the Year	Do It Anyway	Nominated	
2024	Country Music Association of Ontario	Album / EP of the Year	Do It Anyway	Nominated	
2024	Country Music Association of Ontario	Single of the Year	"Rodeo Queen"	Nominated	
2024	Country Music Association of Ontario	Songwriter(s) of the Year	"Rodeo Queen"	Nominated	
2024	Canadian Country Music Association	Album of the Year	Do It Anyway	Won	
2024	Canadian Country Music Association	Innovative Campaign of the Year	Do It Anyway Album Setup & Release Campaign	Nominated	
2024	Canadian Country Music Association	Single of the Year	"Rodeo Queen"	Nominated	
2024	Canadian Country Music Association	Songwriter(s) of the Year	"Rodeo Queen"	Nominated	
