= Sacha (singer) =

Canadian country singer and songwriter

- Born: Montreal, Quebec, Canada
- Origin: Warkworth, Ontario, Canada
- Genres: Country
- Occupations: Singer; songwriter
- Instruments: Guitar; vocals
- Years active: 2013–present
- Labels: Sony Music Canada; Starseed Records
- Website: Official website

Sacha Visagie, known mononymously as Sacha (or SACHA), is a Canadian country music singer and songwriter from Warkworth, Ontario. She is currently signed to Sony Music Canada. She has charted several singles in Canada, including "Hey Mom I Made It", "Til I Don't", "Shooting Star", and "What the Truck".

== Early life ==
Sacha and her family moved to Warkworth from Montreal, Quebec, when she was a toddler. She lived with her twin sister, two brothers, mother, and stepfather, and they were the only black family in the town. Around the time of junior high school, Sacha and her family moved to Oshawa, Ontario. She cites Patsy Cline and Taylor Swift as two artists she listened to and was inspired by as a child.

== Career ==
In 2013, Sacha released an anti-bullying-themed song "Stix N Stones", which garnered some online attention and led to performing at different schools. The song was included on her debut independent album Just Like You in 2014. During her first trips to Nashville, Tennessee, she stayed at a house belonging to SOCAN, which allowed Canadian songwriters to stay for free in support of their career. In 2016, she won a competition titled "Canada's Next Country Star".

In 2020, Sacha independently released an extended play The Best Thing. The EP included the single "Standards", which was her first top 50 song at Canadian country radio. In 2021, Sacha was named one of CMT's "Next Women of Country". That same year, she collaborated with The Reklaws on the promotional single "What the Truck". The song went on to become the fastest Canadian country song to achieve 1 Million domestic streams and was later certified Platinum by Music Canada. In early 2022, Sacha performed as an opening act for Maddie & Tae on their "All Song No Static Tour" in the United States.

In February 2022, Sacha released the extended play We Did on Starseed Records. The EP's title track, "We Did", became her first top 30 single on Canada Country. In September 2022, she won the annual year-long SiriusXM "Top of the Country" competition. That same month, Sacha received a nomination for "Rising Star" at the 2022 Canadian Country Music Awards, and won "Top Selling Canadian Single of the Year" for "What the Truck" with the Reklaws. In October 2022, she released the single "Call It Country", which featured fellow Canadian country artist Jade Eagleson. In February 2023, Sacha released her first pop single "Confident", featuring Canadian singer Tyler Shaw. In May 2023, she released a solo country version of "Confident", which was included on an extended play of the same name, and was released to Canadian country radio.

In September 2023, Sacha signed a record deal with Sony Music Canada. In early 2024, she was one of several Black female country artists that received an increase in streaming numbers and social media followers after the release of Beyoncé's album Cowboy Carter, according to Time. In April 2024, Sacha released her debut major-label single "Hey Mom I Made It", which became her first top 20 song at Canadian country radio. In January 2025, she released the extended play Where to Start, which included "Hey Mom I Made It" and the single "Til I Don't".

She received a Juno Award nomination for Breakthrough Artist or Group of the Year at the Juno Awards of 2026.

== Discography ==
=== Albums ===
Title	Details
Just Like You	Release date: October 6, 2014; Label: Sacha; Format: Digital download, streaming
Woman in the Mirror	Release date: May 30, 2025; Label: Sony Music Canada; Format: Digital download, streaming

=== Extended plays ===
Title	Details
The Best Thing	Release date: July 24, 2020; Label: Independent; Format: Digital download, streaming
We Did	Release date: February 4, 2022; Label: Starseed Records; Format: Digital download, streaming
Confident	Release date: May 5, 2023; Label: Starseed Records; Format: Digital download, streaming
Where to Start	Release date: January 31, 2025; Label: Sony Music Canada; Format: Digital download, streaming

=== Singles ===
Year	Title	Peak chart positions	Album
Year	Title	CAN Country	Album
2020	"Standards"	43	The Best Thing
2022	"We Did"	28	We Did
2022	"Call It Country" (featuring Jade Eagleson)	50	Non-album single
2023	"Confident" (solo or featuring Tyler Shaw)	42	Confident
2024	"Hey Mom I Made It"	8	Where to Start
2025	"Til I Don't"	17	Where to Start
2025	"Shooting Star" (with Restless Road)	18	Woman in the Mirror

=== Promotional singles ===
Year	Title	Peak chart positions		Certifications	Album
Year	Title	CAN Digital	CAN Country	Certifications	Album
2021	"What the Truck" (with the Reklaws)	25	—	MC: Platinum	We Did
2024	"High Life"	—	—		Where to Start
2025	"Where Are You Christmas"	—	46		Non-album promotional single
"—" denotes releases that did not chart.

=== Christmas singles ===
Year	Title
2024	"Rockin' Around the Christmas Tree"

=== Music videos ===
Year	Title	Director
2020	"Cheers"	Travis Didluck
2021	"Standards"	Travis Didluck
2022	"Pretty Please"	Ben Knechtel
2023	"Confident" (featuring Tyler Shaw)	Ben Knechtel
2024	"Hey Mom I Made It"	Jeff Johnson
2024	"High Life"	Not listed
2025	"Til I Don't"	Alex Ayala

== Awards and nominations ==
Year	Association	Category	Nominated work	Result	Ref
2022	CCMA	Rising Star	—N/a	Nominated	
2024	CCMA	Songwriter(s) of the Year (with Shawn Chambliss, Jake Saghi)	"Hey Mom I Made It"	Nominated	
2025	Canadian Country Music Association	Breakthrough Artist or Group of the Year	—N/a	Nominated	
2025	Canadian Country Music Association	Female Artist of the Year	—N/a	Nominated	
2025	Canadian Country Music Association	Video of the Year	"Hey Mom I Made It"	Nominated	
2026	Juno Awards	Breakthrough Artist or Group of the Year	—N/a	Nominated	
