= Max Jackson =

Australian musical artist

- Born: 11 November 1991 (age 35)
- Origin: Coonamble, New South Wales
- Genre: Country
- Occupations: Singer, songwriter
- Instruments: Vocals; guitar
- Label: ABC Music (2023–present)
- Website: www.maxjackson.com.au

Max Jackson (born 11 November 1991) is an Australian country music singer-songwriter. At the 2025 Country Music Awards of Australia, she won Female Artist of the Year.

== Life and career ==
=== Early life ===
Jackson grew up in Coonamble, New South Wales. She has one sister. She was inspired by artists including Gina Jeffreys, Beccy Cole, Adam Harvey and Troy Cassar-Daley and international artists Dolly Parton and Shania Twain. Her family moved to Newcastle, New South Wales and she commenced singing at local music nights, scoring her first professional gig at age 13. Jeffrey's husband and musical producer Rod McCormack began mentoring Jackson shortly after.

=== 2017–present: Career beginnings ===
In November 2017, Jackson released a Christmas album, I Love Christmas and single "Under the Christmas Tree".

In February 2020 Jackson released the album Life of the Party. Country Music Capital News' described the songs on the album as "carefully crafted, nuanced and expertly woven together".

In January 2022, Jackson won the 2022 Toyota Star Maker award and flew to Nashville, USA as part of her prize.

In January 2023, Jackson released the 4-track EP Out Here. Jackson signed with ABC Music in 2023.

At the 2025 Country Music Awards of Australia, Jackson won Female Artist of the Year and Single of the Year for "Little More Country".

Jackson's third studio album Dangerous in Denim will be released in February 2026.

== Personal life ==
Jackson married Jeremy Minett in Wallalong, New South Wales on 9 September 2022. The live in the Hunter Valley.

== Discography ==
=== Albums ===
List of albums, with selected details
Title	Details	Peak chart positions
Title	Details	AUS
I Love Christmas	Released: November 2017; Label: Pistol; Formats: CD, digital download	—
Life of the Party	Released: February 2020; Label: Sonic Timber; Formats: CD, digital download	—
Dangerous in Denim	Released: February 2026; Label: ABC Music; Formats: CD, digital download	54

=== Extended plays ===
List of EPs, with selected details
Title	Details
Out Here	Released: January 2023; Label: Max Jackson; Formats: CD, digital download
Little More Country Sessions	Released: 24 March 2025; Label: Max Jackson, ABC Music; Formats: digital download

== Awards and nominations ==
=== ARIA Music Awards ===
The ARIA Music Awards is an annual awards ceremony that recognises excellence, innovation, and achievement across all genres of Australian music.

Year	Nominee / work	Award	Result	Ref.
2026	Dangerous in Denim	Best Country Album	Nominated	

=== Country Music Awards of Australia ===
The Country Music Awards of Australia (CMAA) (also known as the Golden Guitar Awards) is an annual awards night held in January during the Tamworth Country Music Festival, celebrating recording excellence in the Australian country music industry. They have been held annually since 1973.

Awards wins for Max Jackson
Year	Nominee / work	Award	Result (wins only)	Ref.
2022	Max Jackson	Star Maker Award	Won	
2024	Max Jackson	New Talent of the Year	Won	
2025	"Little More Country"	Single of the Year	Won	
2025	Max Jackson	Female Artist of the Year	Won	
2026	Max Jackson	Female Artist of the Year	Won	

=== Canadian Country Music Association Awards ===
Year	Nominee / work	Award	Result	Ref.
2025	"Won't Forget" (with Dan Davidson, Tim Hicks)	Musical Collaboration of the Year	Nominated	
