= Hey Mom I Made It =

2024 song by Sacha

Single by Sacha

from the EP Where to Start
- Released: April 26, 2024
- Genre: Country; country pop
- Length: 2:49
- Label: Sony Music Canada
- Songwriter(s): Sacha Visagie; Jake Saghi; Shawn Chambliss
- Producer(s): James Robbins; Eric Arjes

Sacha singles chronology
"Confident" (2023)	"Hey Mom I Made It" (2024)	"Til I Don't" (2025)

Music video
- "Hey Mom I Made It" on YouTube

"Hey Mom I Made It" is a song recorded by Canadian country artist Sacha. She wrote the song with Jake Saghi and Shawn Chamblis, while Jimmy Robbins and Eric Arjes produced the track. Sacha and her co-writers received a nomination for "Songwriter(s) of the Year" at the 2024 Canadian Country Music Awards for writing the song. It was the lead single off her 2025 extended play, Where to Start.

== Background ==
Sacha told CBC Music that the song's theme is about how she "overcame personal and professional setbacks to find joy in her life". In a press release, she added that she "wanted to make a song that inspires others to not give up on their dreams", and that she sought to "make a song that was both powerful and vulnerable". The song marked Sacha's debut major label release with Sony Music Canada after signing with them the year prior.

== Accolades ==
Year	Association	Category	Result	Ref
2024	Canadian Country Music Association	Songwriter(s) of the Year	Nominated	
2025	Country Music Association of Ontario	Single of the Year	Nominated	
2025	Canadian Country Music Association	Video of the Year	Nominated	

== Music video ==
The official music video for "Hey Mom I Made It" premiered on YouTube on July 10, 2024. The video was directed by Jeff Johnson, and also premiered the same day in the United States on CMT and on the Paramount Times Square Billboard in New York City.

== Charts ==
Chart performance for "Hey Mom I Made It"
Chart (2024)	Peak position
Canada Country (Billboard)	8
UK Country Airplay (Radiomonitor)	20
