= Tony Stevens (Canadian singer) =

Canadian country singer and songwriter

- Born: 1984 (age 41–42); Coquitlam, British Columbia, Canada
- Origin: Surrey, British Columbia, Canada
- Genre: Country
- Occupations: Singer, songwriter
- Instruments: Guitar, vocals
- Years active: 2019-present
- Label: Willing Entertainment / Universal Music Canada
- Website: Official website

Anthony Steven Petrunia, known professionally as Tony Stevens, is a Canadian country music singer and songwriter from Surrey, British Columbia. He is currently signed to Willing Entertainment. He has charted with the singles "Tomorrow Today", "Whiskey in Colorado", and "When I Hear That Song".

== Early life ==
Stevens was raised in Coquitlam, British Columbia, but moved to Surrey when he was thirteen years old. In his twenties, he elected not to pursue a full-time music career as he was working a career in construction, got married, and was starting a family. In 2013, Stevens suffered a serious brain injury in a wakeboarding accident in Tulameen. After recovering, he began thinking once again about pursuing a career as a musician, and eventually began the process of doing so.

== Career ==
In 2022, Stevens released the song "Cochrane Avenue". The next year, he released "Tomorrow Today", his first single to Canadian country radio. The song would later reach the top 50 on the Billboard Canada Country chart. In 2024, he was a semi-finalist in the SiriusXM Top of the Country competition. Stevens also released the single "Whiskey in Colorado" in January 2024. The song went on to reach the number eight on the Canada Country chart, while Stevens and his co-writers received a nomination for Songwriter(s) of the Year at the 2024 Canadian Country Music Awards for writing it. Later that year, he released a follow-up single "When I Hear That Song". Both songs were included on Stevens' debut album, Days Like This, which was released in May 2025. Stevens was nominated for Breakthrough Artist or Group of the Year at the 2025 Canadian Country Music Association Awards.

== Discography ==
=== Albums ===
Title	Details
Days Like This	Release date: May 9, 2025; Label: Willing Entertainment; Format: Digital download, streaming

=== Singles ===
Title	Year	Peak chart positions	Album
Title	Year	CAN Country	Album
"Tomorrow Today"	2023	47	Days Like This
"Whiskey in Colorado"	2024	8	Days Like This
"When I Hear That Song"	2024	36	Days Like This
"You Problem"	2025	54	Days Like This
"Nothing on Me"	2026	34	Non-album single

== Awards and nominations ==
Year	Association	Category	Nominated work	Result	Ref
2024	Canadian Country Music Association	Songwriter of the Year	"Whiskey in Colorado" (with Dan Swinimer, Wes Mack, David Borus)	Nominated	
2025	Canadian Country Music Association	Breakthrough Artist or Group of the Year	—N/a	Nominated	
