= Love Hate Love (song) =

2026 single by Owen Riegling

Single by Owen Riegling

from the album In the Feeling
- Released: February 13, 2026
- Genre: Country pop
- Length: 2:55
- Label: Universal Canada; Big Loud
- Songwriters: Owen Riegling; Oscar Charles; Luke Laird; Luke Preston
- Producer: Oscar Charles

Owen Riegling singles chronology
"Taillight This Town" (2025)	"Love Hate Love" (2026)	"Me Without My Hometown" (2026)

Visualizer
- "Love Hate Love" on YouTube

"Love Hate Love" is a song recorded by Canadian country music artist Owen Riegling. He wrote the song with Luke Preston, Luke Laird, and Oscar Charles, the latter of whom produced the track. It is the second single off Riegling's 2026 album In the Feeling.

== Background ==
Riegling and his collaborators wrote "Love Hate Love" in May 2025. He remarked that it felt "special" the day they wrote it, and added that it is "definitely an animated version of my relationship but there is a lot of truth to it".

== Critical reception ==
An uncredited review from Hot Country 93.9 opined that "Love Hate Love" "showcases [Riegling's] big stage energy and evolving confidence". Top Country named the song their "Pick of the Week" for March 25, 2026, stating that it "carries a modern country sound, but still feels grounded in real emotion, built around the push and pull that comes with complicated relationships."

== Music video ==
The official visualizer for "Love Hate Love" was directed by Connor Scheffler and premiered on YouTube on February 13, 2026, concurrently with the song's release.

== Credits and personnel ==
Credits adapted from Apple Music.

- Oscar Charles – drums, percussion, background vocals, production, recording engineer
- Chris Henderson – mastering engineer
- Jeff Huskins – immersive mixing engineer
- Luke Preston – background vocals, acoustic guitar, bass guitar, 12-string electric guitar
- Owen Riegling – vocals, acoustic guitar
- Jordan Rigby – mixing engineer, recording engineer

== Charts ==
Chart performance for "Love Hate Love"
Chart (2026)	Peak position
Canada (Canadian Hot 100)	51
Canada Country (Billboard)	4
