= Moonshines =

2024 single by Owen Riegling

Single by Owen Riegling

from the album Bruce County (From the Beginning)
- Released: August 5, 2024
- Genre: Country; country rock
- Length: 2:48 (radio edit / bootleg version); 3:44 (original / album version)
- Label: Universal Canada
- Songwriters: Owen Riegling; Daryl Scott; Jesse Slack
- Producer: Brad Hill

Owen Riegling singles chronology
"Old Dirt Roads" (2023)	"Moonshines" (2024)	"Coming Home to You (Bigger Houses)" (2024)

Music video
- "Moonshines" on YouTube

"Moonshines" is a song recorded by Canadian country music artist Owen Riegling. He wrote the song with Daryl Scott and Jesse Slack, while it was produced by Brad Hill. It was the second single off his debut major-label extended play Bruce County.

== Critical reception ==
An uncredited article from Harmony Hay described "Moonshines" as "not just a song", but "a vivid painting of life away from the city lights, where the making of moonshine isn't just a job, but a family heritage and a source of pride", noting the use of "stark imagery".

== Live performances ==
On November 17, 2024, Riegling performed "Moonshines" during the kickoff show at the 111th Grey Cup at BC Place in Vancouver, British Columbia. The game was broadcast in Canada on CTV, TSN, and RDS, and on CBS Sports Network in the United States, while Riegling's performance was later uploaded to YouTube.

== Accolades ==
Year	Association	Category	Result	Ref
2025	Country Music Association of Ontario	Music Video of the Year	Nominated	
2025	Country Music Association of Ontario	Single of the Year	Won	
2025	Country Music Association of Ontario	Songwriter(s) of the Year	Won	
2025	Canadian Country Music Association	Single of the Year	Nominated	
2025	Canadian Country Music Association	Songwriter(s) of the Year	Nominated	

== Music video ==
The official visualizer for "Moonshines" was directed by Connor Scheffler and premiered on YouTube on May 24, 2024.

== Track listings ==
Digital download – single

1. "Moonshines" (Bootleg Version) – 2:48
2. "Moonshiness" – 3:44

== Charts ==
Chart performance for "Moonshines"
Chart (2024–2025)	Peak position
Canada (Canadian Hot 100)	94
Canada Country (Mediabase)	2

== Certifications ==
Certifications for "Moonshines"
Region	Certification	Certified units/sales
Canada (Music Canada)	Platinum	80,000^{‡}
^{‡} Sales+streaming figures based on certification alone.
