= Got Your Name on It =

2018 song by Jade Eagleson

Single by Jade Eagleson

from the album Jade Eagleson
- Released: May 18, 2018
- Genre: Country
- Length: 3:08
- Label: Universal Canada
- Songwriters: Jade Eagleson; Todd Clark; Gavin Slate; Travis Wood
- Producers: Todd Clark; Gavin Slate

Jade Eagleson singles chronology
"Got Your Name on It" (2018)	"Count the Ways" (2019)

Music video
- "Got Your Name On It" on YouTube

"Got Your Name on It" is the debut single by Canadian country artist Jade Eagleson. He co-wrote the track with Travis Wood, as well as the track's producers Todd Clark and Gavin Slate. It was the lead single from Eagleson's debut self-titled extended play, and album Jade Eagleson.

== Critical reception ==
Front Porch Music referred to the song as a "light-hearted profession of love", noting its "versatile" sound that has "mainstream quality” but "stays true to Eagleson’s traditional roots".

== Commercial performance ==
"Got Your Name on It" peaked at number six on the Billboard Canada Country chart for the week of November 3, 2018, giving Eagleson his first top ten. It reached #90 on the Canadian Hot 100, and was certified Platinum by Music Canada.

== Music video ==
The official music video for "Got Your Name on It" premiered on Wide Open Country on July 6, 2018. It was directed by Ben Knechtel and shot on location at Eagleson's grandparents' farm in Bailieboro, Ontario. It features a young boy singing the song to a girl, before eventually growing up and featuring Eagleson singing to actress Marina Paquin. The two had never met prior to the filming of the video, and they would go on to date and then marry. Eagleson's parents both make cameo appearances in the video. The video became the first song from a Canadian-signed artist in any genre to be featured on YouTube Trending's 'Artist On The Rise'. It subsequently received more views than any other Canadian country music video of all-time.

== Chart performance ==
Chart (2018)	Peak position
Canada (Canadian Hot 100)	90
Canada Country (Billboard)	6

== Certifications ==
Region	Certification	Certified units/sales
Canada (Music Canada)	Platinum	80,000^{‡}
^{‡} Sales+streaming figures based on certification alone.
