= Taillight This Town =

2025 single by Owen Riegling

Single by Owen Riegling

from the album In the Feeling
- Released: October 3, 2025
- Genre: Country
- Length: 3:06
- Label: Universal Canada; Big Loud
- Songwriters: Owen Riegling; Kyle Sturrock; Jimi Bell
- Producer: Oscar Charles

Owen Riegling singles chronology
"Coming Home to You (Bigger Houses)" (2025)	"Taillight This Town" (2025)	"Love Hate Love" (2026)

Visualizer
- "Taillight This Town" on YouTube

"Taillight This Town" is a song recorded by Canadian country music artist Owen Riegling. He wrote the song with Kyle Sturrock and Jimi Bell, while Oscar Charles produced the track. It is the lead single off Riegling's second album, In the Feeling.

== Background ==
"Taillight This Town" marked Riegling's first new song in nearly a year. He described the song as being "about new beginnings, about leaving behind what's familiar to chase something new, while still carrying the pieces of where you come from". The song also marked Riegling's first release after signing a U.S. record deal with Big Loud.

== Critical reception ==
Heather Taylor-Singh of Billboard Canada called the track "uplifting", opining that it "[captures] the energy of fresh starts and coming of age", noting the use of "warm electric guitar and crashing drums".

== Music video ==
The official visualizer for "Taillight This Town" premiered on YouTube on October 22, 2025.

== Credits and personnel ==
Credits adapted from Apple Music.

- Oscar Charles – drums, synthesizer, bass guitar, production
- Chris Henderson – master engineering
- Jeff Huskins – immersive mixing engineering
- Rob McNelley – electric guitar
- Owen Riegling – vocals, electric guitar, acoustic guitar
- Jordan Rigby – mix engineering, recording engineering

== Charts ==
Chart performance for "Taillight This Town"
Chart (2026)	Peak position
Canada (Canadian Hot 100)	60
Canada Country (Billboard)	8
