= Close (Jade Eagleson song) =

2020 song by Jade Eagleson

Single by Jade Eagleson

from the album Jade Eagleson
- Released: April 24, 2020
- Genre: Country
- Length: 3:04
- Label: Universal Canada
- Songwriter(s): Jade Eagleson; Todd Clark; Gavin Slate; Travis Wood
- Producer(s): Todd Clark; Gavin Slate

Jade Eagleson singles chronology
"Lucky" (2019)	"Close" (2020)	"All Night to Figure It Out" (2021)

Music video
- "Close" on YouTube

"Close" is a song co-written and recorded by Canadian country artist Jade Eagleson. He co-wrote the track with Gavin Slate and Travis Wood, as well as the track's producer Todd Clark. It was the fourth single from Eagleson's debut studio album Jade Eagleson.

== Background ==
Eagleson remarked that "A little piece of my heart went into writing this song. It describes the kind of love that changes your world, the type of love that when you find it, you know nothing can make you feel the way it does".

== Live performance ==
Eagleson performed "Close" on ET Canada and the CCMA Foundation's "Canada Together: In Concert" event in April 2020, during the COVID-19 pandemic.

== Commercial performance ==
"Close" reached a peak of number eight on the Billboard Canada Country chart for the week of October 24, 2020, giving Eagleson his fourth consecutive top ten hit to start his career. It also reached #88 on the Canadian Hot 100, and was certified Gold by Music Canada.

== Music video ==
The official music video for "Close" premiered on June 8, 2020.

== Credits and personnel ==
Credits adapted from AllMusic.

- Jade Eagleson – lead vocals, backing vocals, songwriting
- Todd Clark — backing vocals, production, engineering, guitar, keyboard, programming, songwriting
- Owen Lewis - editing, engineering
- Tony Lucido – bass guitar
- Andrew Mendelson – master engineering
- Justin Niebank - mixing
- Justin Ostrander – guitar
- Jerry Roe – drums
- Justin Schipper – banjo, steel guitar, mandolin
- Gavin Slate – backing vocals, guitar, programming, songwriting
- Travis Wood – backing vocals, songwriting

== Charts ==
Chart (2020)	Peak position
Canada (Canadian Hot 100)	88
Canada Country (Billboard)	8

== Certifications ==
Region	Certification	Certified units/sales
Canada (Music Canada)	Gold	40,000^{‡}
^{‡} Sales+streaming figures based on certification alone.
