= CJOJ-FM =

Radio station in Belleville, Ontario

Coordinates: 44.16899°N 77.38577°W

- Belleville, Ontario; Canada
- Broadcast area: Belleville-Quinte West
- Frequency: 95.5 MHz
- Branding: Hits 95.5

Programming
- Format: Adult hits

Ownership
- Owner: Starboard Communications
- Sister stations: CHCQ-FM

History
- First air date: 1990

Technical information
- Class: C1
- ERP: 23,000 watts average 35,000 watts peak
- HAAT: 152.5 metres (500 ft)

Links
- Website: hits955.ca

CJOJ-FM (95.5 MHz) is a Canadian radio station in Belleville, Ontario, known as Hits 95.5. It airs an adult hits format. It is owned by Starboard Communications, which also owns sister station CHCQ-FM.

== History ==
On November 13, 1990, Twigg Communications Ltd. received CRTC approval to operate a new FM station at 102.3 MHz in Belleville, Ontario. The new station would offer a format targeted at 12- to 34-year-olds (Group II hard rock). On October 30, 1992, the CRTC approved an application by Belleville Radio Limited to move CJOJ-FM's frequency from 102.3 MHz to its current 95.5 MHz frequency. CJOJ began on-air tests in October 1993 and signed on the air as OJ 95 on December 1 that same year. The 95.5 frequency was once occupied by CJBC-FM-1, which moved to 94.3 FM. The former 102.3 frequency is now occupied by CKJJ.

On July 26, 2002, the CRTC approved the application by John Sheratt to acquire CJOJ from Belleville Radio Ltd. and CHCQ-FM from CHCQ Ltd. Anthony Zwigg, owned both Belleville Radio Limited and CHCQ Limited. Mr. Sherratt, had been assisting Mr. Zwigg in establishing CHCQ and in the operation of CJOJ. As he became more involved in these activities, Mr. Sherratt decided to make an offer to Mr. Zwigg for the purchase of the two stations. Sherratt's company was Starboard Communications Ltd. On October 23, 2002, Starboard Communications received CRTC approval to decrease CJOJ's power from 50,000 watts to 42,000 watts ERP, and to relocate the transmitter to a site near Oak Lake in Stirling, approximately 25 kilometres west of the existing site.

On February 7, 2003, CJOJ dropped its adult contemporary format and switched to adult hits branded as Classic Hits 95.5. By 2008, it was known as just 95.5. Around 2009 or 2010, the station rebranded as 95.5 Hits FM, sticking with the adult hits/classic hits format.

On May 19, 2015, the CRTC approved Starboard's application to decrease CJOJ's effective radiated power (ERP) from 42,000 to 23,000 watts (64,000 to 35,000 watts Max. ERP).

CJOJ is currently owned by Starboard Communications, along with CHCQ-FM.
