= Alli Walker =

Canadian country musician

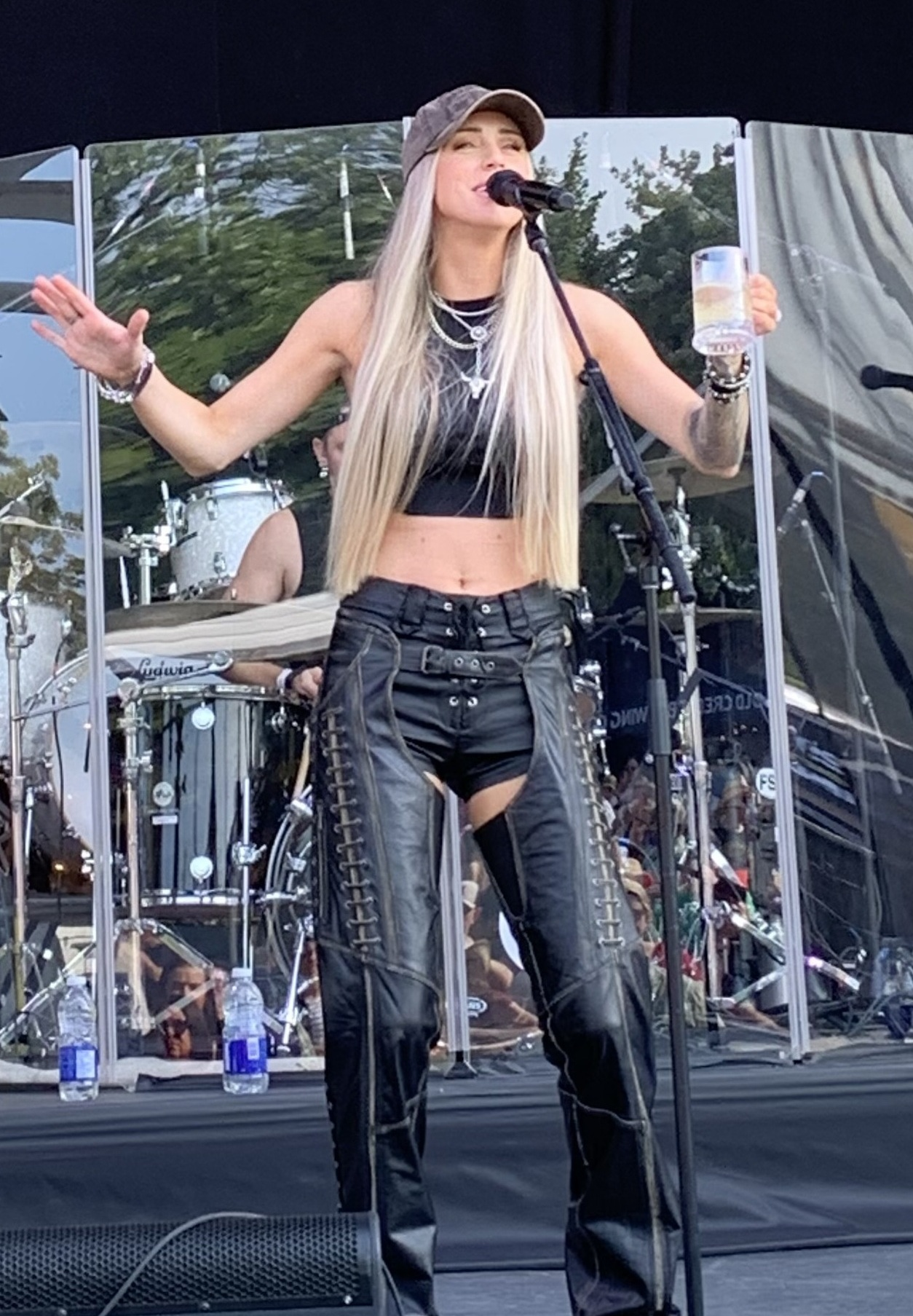
- Walker performing at Toronto's Festival of Beer in 2024

Background information
- Born: July 30, 1990 (age 36)
- Origin: Summerside, Prince Edward Island, Canada
- Genres: Country; country rock
- Occupation: Singer-songwriter
- Instruments: Vocals; bagpipes; guitar
- Years active: 2009–present
- Labels: 604, Records Nashville
- Website: alliwalker.com

Alli Jean Walker is a Canadian country music singer from Summerside, Prince Edward Island. She has released two albums: The Basement Sessions: What I've Learned So Far in 2019 and Growing Up in 2023.

== Early life ==
Walker grew up in Prince Edward Island. After learning the piano and drums, she learned how to play the bagpipes, and attended several international bagpiping competitions. Walker turned down a scholarship to the University of Arkansas, as she was inspired by Taylor Swift to pursue a career in country music. She attended the University of Prince Edward Island for one year as a vocal major, but elected to drop out as the program was focused on classical training. In 2009, Walker moved to Toronto, Ontario to pursue a career in country music and modelling. She met her husband at a Rascal Flatts concert soon after moving to Toronto.

== Career ==
After ten years of developing her music, Walker released her debut album The Basement Sessions: What I've Learned So Far on September 13, 2019. She recorded the songs in the basement of her home with her husband.

Shortly thereafter, Walker and her husband moved to Kelowna, British Columbia. She subsequently released her second album Growing Up on March 10, 2023. The album included the single "Red Wine or Whiskey", and several previously released songs including "Country Music", "Maybe I'm Still Drunk", and a female point-of-view version of "Sand in My Boots".

Later that year, Walker released the song "The Whiskey's Gone". The song garnered significant attention on social media, and Walker subsequently moved with her husband to Nashville, Tennessee, at the end of the year, and released the song "Hung Up". In March 2024, Walker signed her first record deal with RECORDS Nashville and released the song "I Like Big Trucks". In April 2024, Walker received a significant amount of media attention after she performed her song "Creek" at a Nashville Predators playoff hockey game and drank beer from the mouth of a dead catfish. A video of the incident was later shown on Hockey Night in Canada as well as an ESPN national broadcast in the United States. Walker received a nomination for Female Artist of the Year at the 2024 Canadian Country Music Awards.

In 2025, Walker released the single "First Time Living", which featured American country artist Gretchen Wilson. In September 2025, Walker signed a record deal with 604 Records, exclusively for releases in Canada and Australia.

== Discography ==
=== Studio albums ===
Title	Details
The Basement Sessions: What I've Learned So Far	Release date: September 13, 2019; Label: Independent; Format: CD, digital download, streaming
Growing Up	Release date: March 10, 2023; Label: Independent; Format: Digital download, streaming

=== Singles ===
Year	Title	Peak chart positions	Album
Year	Title	CAN Country	Album
2022	"Red Wine or Whiskey"	—	Growing Up
2025	"First Time Living" (with Gretchen Wilson)	43	Non-album single

=== Other charted songs ===
Year	Title	Peak chart positions	Album
Year	Title	CAN Country	Album
2024	"I Like Big Trucks"	52	Non-album single

=== Featured singles ===
Year	Title	Artist	Album
2024	"Girls at the Bar"	Lydia Sutherland	Pretty Girls Don't Cry

=== Music videos ===
Year	Video	Director
2019	"Fight Till the End"	Eric Paul
2019	"Sunny Day"	Eric Paul
2021	"Country Music"	Derek Lamoureux
2022	"Maybe I'm Still Drunk"	Derek Lamoureux
2022	"Home Town Home"	Derek Lamoureux
2022	"Red Wine or Whiskey"	Derek Lamoureux
2022	"Same Stars"	Derek Lamoureux
2023	"Good Ol' Days"	Evan Berg / Jordan Ambrosio
2023	"The Whiskey's Gone"	P.J. Brown
2024	"Nashville"	Justin Key
2025	"Ride It Out"	Connor Scheffler

== Awards and nominations ==
Year	Association	Category	Nominated work	Result	Ref
2024	Canadian Country Music Association	Female Artist of the Year	—N/a	Nominated	
2025	Canadian Country Music Association	Innovative Campaign of the Year	"Ride It Out" – A Cultural Moment, Not Just a Song	Nominated	
2025	Canadian Country Music Association	Video of the Year	"Ride It Out"	Nominated	
