= Count the Ways =

2019 song by Jade Eagleson

Single by Jade Eagleson

from the album Jade Eagleson
- Released: February 15, 2019
- Genre: Country
- Length: 3:15
- Label: Universal Canada
- Songwriter(s): Jade Eagleson; Todd Clark; Gavin Slate; Travis Wood
- Producer(s): Todd Clark; Gavin Slate

Jade Eagleson singles chronology
"Got Your Name on It" (2018)	"Count the Ways" (2019)	"Lucky" (2019)

Music video
- "Count the Ways" on YouTube

"Count the Ways" is a song co-written and recorded by Canadian country artist Jade Eagleson. He wrote the track with Travis Wood, and the track's producers Todd Clark and Gavin Slate. It was the second single from Eagleson's debut studio album Jade Eagleson.

== Commercial performance ==
"Count the Ways" reached a peak of number four on the Billboard Canada Country chart for the week of July 20, 2019, marking Eagleson's second consecutive top ten hit after debuting with "Got Your Name on It" in 2018. It has been certified Platinum by Music Canada.

== Music video ==
The official music video for "Count the Ways" premiered on April 24, 2019, and was directed by Ben Knechtel. It was shot in both Toronto, Ontario and at The Golden Wheel in Peterborough, Ontario, a spot in which Eagleson previously played for the kitchen staff at early in his music career.

== Credits and personnel ==
Credits adapted from Jade Eagleson CD booklet.

- Jade Eagleson – lead vocals
- Todd Clark — backing vocals, guitar, keyboard, drums, programming, production, engineering
- Matty Green — mixing
- Tony Lucido — bass guitar
- Gavin Slate — backing vocals, guitar, programming, production
- Derek Wells — guitar
- Travis Wood — guitar

== Charts ==
Chart (2019)	Peak position
Canada Country (Billboard)	4

== Certifications ==
Region	Certification	Certified units/sales
Canada (Music Canada)	Platinum	80,000^{‡}
^{‡} Sales+streaming figures based on certification alone.
