= Honkytonk Revival =

2021 studio album by Jade Eagleson

Studio album by Jade Eagleson
- Released: November 12, 2021
- Genre: Country; neotraditional country
- Length: 24:56
- Label: Starseed
- Producer: Todd Clark; Gavin Slate

Jade Eagleson chronology
Jade Eagleson (2020)	Honkytonk Revival (2021)	Do It Anyway (2023)

Singles from Jade Eagleson
- 1. "All Night to Figure It Out" Released: February 12, 2021; 2. "More Drinkin' Than Fishin'" Released: July 23, 2021; 3. "She Don't Know" Released: January 23, 2022

Honkytonk Revival is the second studio album by Canadian country artist Jade Eagleson. It was released on November 12, 2021 via Starseed Records. The album features three singles: "All Night to Figure It Out", "More Drinkin' Than Fishin', and "She Don't Know". Each single reached number one on the Canada Country chart, making Eagleson the second Canadian country artist to land three consecutive number ones from their second studio album, following Shania Twain who accomplished this feat with The Woman in Me in 1995. The album was named "Top Selling Canadian Album" at the 2022 Canadian Country Music Awards.

== Background ==
Eagleson aimed to return to the sound of neotraditional country with the release of Honkytonk Revival, citing George Strait, Alan Jackson, Randy Travis, and Shania Twain as artists he listened to growing up that influenced the sound of this album. He remarked that it was "important to have the same sounds" as his "heroes" on the album, and was pleased to have Brent Mason playing lead guitar on the tracks. Eagleson noted that he is "very big" on "making people smile" with his music.

== Critical reception ==
Kim Hughes of Parton and Pearl reviewed the album favourably, stating that it is "studiously well-crafted," "buoyed by the top tools of the trade and by a slick 90s-era country sensibility," while noting the prevalence of "fiddles, dobro, [and] steel guitars". She said that while the lyrics are "built for belted singalongs," they are also "especially compelling on closer listen". Eric Volmers of the Calgary Herald stated that Eagleson is "blessed with an earthy baritone that makes every word convey old-school authenticity, which perhaps lets him get away with having his tongue planted in his cheek on many of those drinking songs" on the album.

== Track listing ==
Honkytonk Revival
No.	Title	Writer(s)	Length
1.	"Whiskey Thinks I Am"	Jade Eagleson, Daryl Scott	3:28
2.	"Hangover Like You"	Daniel Tashian, John Osborne	2:50
3.	"She Don't Know"	Jonathan Singleton, James Barker, Travis Wood	3:24
4.	"Big"	Ashley Ray, Derrick Southerland, Jamie Moore	3:30
5.	"Rather Be Single"	Geoff Warburton, Griffen Palmer	2:49
6.	"All Night to Figure It Out"	Ben Stennis, Brad Rempel, Jeremy Spillman	2:50
7.	"More Drinkin' Than Fishin'" (with Dean Brody)	Wood, Gavin Slate, Jenna Walker, Stuart Walker	2:59
8.	"I Don't Drink"	Eagleson, Scott, Kyle Renton	3:03
Total length:			24:56

== Charts ==
=== Singles ===
Year	Single	Peak positions		Certifications
Year	Single	CAN Country	CAN	Certifications
2021	"All Night to Figure It Out"	1	67	MC: Gold
2021	"More Drinkin' Than Fishin'" (with Dean Brody)	1	81	MC: Gold
2022	"She Don't Know"	1	57	MC: Gold
"—" denotes releases that did not chart

== Awards and nominations ==
Year	Award	Category	Work	Result	Ref
2022	Country Music Association of Ontario	Album of the Year	Honkytonk Revival	Nominated	
2022	Country Music Association of Ontario	Music Video of the Year	"More Drinkin' Than Fishin'"	Nominated	
2022	Canadian Country Music Association	Album of the Year	Honkytonk Revival	Nominated	
2022	Canadian Country Music Association	Single of the Year	"All Night to Figure It Out"	Nominated	
2022	Canadian Country Music Association	Single of the Year	"More Drinkin' Than Fishin'" (with Dean Brody)	Nominated	
2022	Canadian Country Music Association	Video of the Year	"More Drinkin' Than Fishin'" (with Dean Brody)	Nominated	
2022	Canadian Country Music Association	Top Selling Canadian Album of the Year	Honkytonk Revival	Won	
2023	Juno Awards	Country Album of the Year	Honkytonk Revival	Nominated	

== Release history ==
Release formats for Honkytonk Revival
Country	Date	Format	Label	Ref.
Various	November 12, 2021	Digital download	Starseed Records	
Various	November 12, 2021	Streaming	Starseed Records	
