= Shakin' in Them Boots =

2022 single by Jade Eagleson

Single by Jade Eagleson

from the album Do It Anyway
- Released: August 5, 2022
- Genre: Country
- Length: 2:49
- Label: Starseed
- Songwriter(s): James Barker; Blake Pendergrass; Jacob Durrett
- Producer(s): Todd Clark

Jade Eagleson singles chronology
"She Don't Know" (2022)	"Shakin' in Them Boots" (2022)	"Call It Country" (2022)

Music video
- "Shakin' in Them Boots" on YouTube

"Shakin' in Them Boots" is a song recorded by Canadian country music singer Jade Eagleson. The song was written by James Barker of the James Barker Band along with Blake Pendergrass and Jacob Durrett, while Todd Clark produced the track. It is the lead single off Eagleson's third studio album Do It Anyway.

== Background ==
Eagleson described the song as a "fun one" that is driven by the fiddle, while adding that "there aren’t a ton of up-tempo songs out there that have country roots like this" which is why he knew he "had to put it out". He stated that he and his band love to play the song live and remarked that he hoped listeners would "have as much fun listening to it as we’ve been having playing it".

== Critical reception ==
Migs Lava of Canadian Beats Media reviewed the song favourably, saying that it "brings the sounds of Eagleson’s traditional seven-piece band to life with the harmonies of the timeless neo-traditional country he’s become known for". James Daykin of Entertainment Focus called the track a "barn burner" that is "sure to get anyone’s toe tapping during the first listen," adding that it "will naturally fall into the next line dancing playlist with its fast paced, swingin’ round the room tempo."

== Commercial performance ==
"Shakin' in Them Boots" peaked at number two on the Billboard Canada Country chart for the week of December 17, 2022, after 18 weeks on the chart. This marked Eagleson's eighth-consecutive top ten hit since his debut single in 2018. The song also peaked at number 94 on the Canadian Hot 100 for the week of October 15, 2022. It has been certified Platinum by Music Canada.

== Live performance ==
Eagleson performed "Shakin' in Them Boots" live at the 2023 Canadian Country Music Awards at the FirstOntario Centre in Hamilton, Ontario on September 16, 2023. The show was broadcast live on CTV in Canada, and his performance was later uploaded to YouTube.

== Music video ==
The official music video for "Shakin' in Them Boots" premiered on CMT on November 14, 2022. The video was directed by Ben Knechtel, and produced by Silent K. Eagleson remarked that he believed the video "brings the song to life by how energetic it is from start to finish," adding that "the song itself is very fast-paced and upbeat, and the video matches that perfectly" and that he always wanted to "release a song we could do a proper two-step to". He remarked that he admired how Shania Twain would tell the story of her songs in her videos and how he "wanted to bring some of that energy into this project".

== Charts ==
Chart performance for "Shakin' in Them Boots"
Chart (2022)	Peak position
Canada (Canadian Hot 100)	94
Canada Country (Billboard)	2

== Certifications ==
Certifications for "Shakin' in Them Boots"
Region	Certification	Certified units/sales
Canada (Music Canada)	Platinum	80,000^{‡}
^{‡} Sales+streaming figures based on certification alone.
