= Rodeo Queen (song) =

2023 single by Jade Eagleson

Single by Jade Eagleson

from the album Do It Anyway
- Released: March 11, 2023
- Genre: Country; neotraditional country
- Length: 3:02
- Label: Starseed
- Songwriters: Jade Eagleson; Daryl Scott
- Producer: Todd Clark

Jade Eagleson singles chronology
"Call It Country" (2022)	"Rodeo Queen" (2023)	"Telluride" (2024)

Visualizer
- "Rodeo Queen" on YouTube

"Rodeo Queen" is a song co-written and recorded by Canadian country music singer Jade Eagleson. He wrote the song with Daryl Scott, while longtime collaborator Todd Clark produced the track. It is the second single off Eagleson's upcoming third studio album, Do It Anyway, which was released in September 2023.

== Background ==
Eagleson stated that he was watching the television series Yellowstone with his wife and his friend Daryl Scott, and realized that there was not a lot of "old" country music being made now that resembled that of Lefty Frizell or Roy Rogers. He and Scott then decided to sit down and write a song with that in mind, and wrote "Rodeo Queen".

Eagleson referenced how he grew up listening to Alan Jackson, Keith Whitley, and Randy Travis, and remarked how he always wanted to release his version of "the classic sound". He stated that he "wanted to remind everyone how much fun country music can be" and took inspiration from seeing the rodeo when he lived in Alberta with his wife.

== Critical reception ==
Mary Claire Crabtree of Whiskey Riff favourably reviewed "Rodeo Queen", stating it is "quick-paced, has a great twang, hits a fun, light-hearted message, and has all the elements of a classic jukebox hit," and noted the use of steel guitar and fiddle. She stated that the song is "solid start for [Eagleson] as he becomes more established in the [United States]". Taylor Jean of Front Porch Music described the song as "a honky-tonk tune that is bringing back everything modern country music has been lacking". Nanci Dagg of Canadian Beats Media stated that the track "brings a country lifestyle story back to country music and embraces a high-energy tempo," and noted the influence of western swing. Jeffrey Kurtis of Today's Country Magazine framed the song as a "bold stamp as [Eagleson] continues to make his mark as the leader of the charge for the honky-tonk flared traditional country music lovers". Gabby Shukin of CJVR called the track "upbeat and fun". Eric Zisman of Country Swag stated that Eagleson "creates music that speaks to the soul of country music and lyrics that attract more fans" and that "Rodeo Queen" is "just an example of that".

== Accolades ==
Year	Association	Category	Result	Ref.
2024	Country Music Association of Ontario	Single of the Year	Nominated	
2024	Country Music Association of Ontario	Songwriter(s) of the Year	Nominated	
2024	Canadian Country Music Association	Single of the Year	Nominated	
2024	Canadian Country Music Association	Songwriter(s) of the Year	Nominated	

== Charts ==
Chart performance for "Rodeo Queen"
Chart (2023)	Peak position
Canada Country (Billboard)	5

== Certifications ==
Region	Certification	Certified units/sales
Canada (Music Canada)	Gold	40,000^{‡}
^{‡} Sales+streaming figures based on certification alone.
