= Jade Eagleson =

Canadian country singer and songwriter (born 1994)

- Eagleson performing at Las Vegas Motor Speedway in 2026

Background information
- Born: May 23, 1994 (age 32)
- Origin: Bailieboro, Ontario, Canada
- Genres: Country; neotraditional country
- Occupations: Singer, songwriter
- Years active: 2017–present
- Labels: BBR; BMG Nashville; Starseed; Umusic
- Website: jadeeagleson.com

Jade Eagleson (born May 23, 1994) is a Canadian country singer and songwriter from Bailieboro, Ontario. He has released three albums: Jade Eagleson (2020), Honkytonk Revival (2021), and Do It Anyway (2023). He has also released twelve singles, achieving five number one Canada Country hits with "Lucky", "All Night to Figure It Out", "More Drinkin' Than Fishin'", "She Don't Know" and "Telluride".

== Early life ==
Eagleson was born and raised on his grandparents's farm in Bailieboro, Ontario. He tended crops and raised livestock with his father before initially heading to Alberta for work at age 19. He then elected to move back to Bailieboro and pursue a career in country music. Eagleson cites Paul Brandt as one of his biggest musical influences, while also viewing Alan Jackson, Randy Travis, George Strait, and Shania Twain as major idols.

== Career ==
=== 2017–2020: Early career and self-titled album ===
In 2017, Eagleson won the Emerging Artist Showcase at the Boots and Hearts Music Festival. In May 2018, Eagleson released "Got Your Name on It", his debut single on Umusic. It would peak at #6 on the Billboard Canada Country chart and at #90 on the Canadian Hot 100. The song has been certified Platinum by Music Canada. Later that year, Eagleson released his debut self-titled extended play. The EP included Eagleson's second single "Count the Ways", which was also certified Platinum by Music Canada and peaked at #4 on the Canada Country chart.

In October 2019, Eagleson released his third single "Lucky". Eagleson was then awarded "Rising Star" at the 2019 CCMA Awards. "Lucky" then became Eagleson's first #1 hit on the Canada Country chart in 2020. In April 2020, Eagleson released his fourth single "Close", which would peak at #8 on the Canada Country chart, and #88 on the Canadian Hot 100 (a new career high). His debut studio album Jade Eagleson was released on July 24, 2020 and included all four of his previous singles.

=== 2021–present: Honkytonk Revival and Do It Anyway ===
In February 2021, Eagleson independently released the single "All Night to Figure It Out". It would become his second Number One Canada Country hit. Shortly after, he released the single "More Drinkin' Than Fishin'", a collaboration with fellow Canadian country artist Dean Brody. On November 12, 2021, Eagleson released his second studio album, Honkytonk Revival, which included "All Night to Figure It Out" and "More Drinkin' Than Fishin'" as well as the single "She Don't Know". As a result of each single off the album reaching number one, Eagleson joined Shania Twain as the only Canadian country artists to ever land three consecutive chart-toppers from their second studio album.

In August 2022, he released the single "Shakin' in Them Boots". At the 2022 Canadian Country Music Awards, Eagleson was awarded the Top Selling Canadian Album of the Year for Honkytonk Revival, and received six other nominations. In March 2023, he released the single "Rodeo Queen". Both singles are included on his third studio album Do It Anyway, which was released on September 29, 2023. At the 2023 Canadian Country Music Awards, Eagleson was named "Entertainer of the Year" and "Male Artist of the Year". According to Mediabase, he was the most played domestic artist and the eight-most played artist overall on Canadian country radio in 2023. "Telluride" became the fourth radio single off Do It Anyway in 2024.

In the summer of 2024, Eagleson supported Cody Johnson as an opening act on the Canadian dates of his "The Leather Tour". In July 2024, he released a new version of the song "Do It Anyway" featuring American country artist Jake Worthington. Eagleson won "Album of the Year" at the 2024 Canadian Country Music Awards for Do It Anyway. In October 2024, he made his debut performance at the Grand Ole Opry. That same month, Eagleson released the songs "Worth the Double" and "Welcome to Rock Bottom", the former of which became a radio single in 2025.

In early 2026, Eagleson embarked on his debut headlining tour, the "Coming Soon to a Honkytonk Near You Tour", across Canada and the United States.

== Personal life ==
Eagleson married his girlfriend Marina Paquin in 2019. Later that year, Marina gave birth to their first son. The couple’s second son was born in 2024. They currently live in Nashville, Tennessee. Eagleson met Paquin on the set of the music video for his debut single "Got Your Name on It". He considers himself a "proud Christian".

== Tours ==
- Coming Soon to a Honkytonk Near You Tour (2026)

== Discography ==
=== Albums ===
Title	Details
Jade Eagleson	Release date: July 24, 2020; Label: Universal Music Canada; Format: CD, digital download, streaming
Honkytonk Revival	Release date: November 12, 2021; Label: Starseed Records; Format: Digital download, streaming
Do It Anyway	Release date: September 29, 2023; Label: Starseed Records; Format: Digital download, streaming

=== Extended plays ===
Title	Details
Jade Eagleson	Release date: October 17, 2018; Label: Universal Music Canada; Format: CD, digital download, streaming
Neon Dreamin'	Release date: August 23, 2023; Label: Starseed Records; Format: Digital download, streaming

=== Singles ===
==== As lead artist ====
Year	Title	Peak positions		Certifications	Album
Year	Title	CAN	CAN Country	Certifications	Album
2018	"Got Your Name on It"	90	6	MC: Platinum	Jade Eagleson
2019	"Count the Ways"	—	4	MC: Platinum	Jade Eagleson
2019	"Lucky"	—	1	MC: Gold	Jade Eagleson
2020	"Close"	85	8	MC: Gold	Jade Eagleson
2021	"All Night to Figure It Out"	67	1	MC: Gold	Honkytonk Revival
2021	"More Drinkin' Than Fishin'" (with Dean Brody)	81	1	MC: Gold	Honkytonk Revival
2022	"She Don't Know"	57	1	MC: Platinum	Honkytonk Revival
2022	"Shakin' in Them Boots"	94	2	MC: Platinum	Do It Anyway
2023	"Rodeo Queen"	—	5	MC: Gold	Do It Anyway
2024	"Telluride"	—	1		Do It Anyway
2024	"Do It Anyway" (with Jake Worthington)	—	5		Non-album singles
2025	"Worth the Double"	—	6		Non-album singles
2026	"Coming Soon to a Honky Tonk Near You" (with Midland)	—	24		TBA
"—" denotes releases that did not chart

==== Christmas singles ====
Year	Title	Peak chart positions	Album
Year	Title	CAN Country	Album
2023	"Joy to the World"	30	Non-album single

==== As featured artist ====
Year	Title	Artist	Peak positions	Album
Year	Title	Artist	CAN Country	Album
2022	"Call It Country"	Sacha	50	Non-album single

=== Music videos ===
Year	Video	Director
2018	"Got Your Name on It"	Ben Knechtel
2019	"Count the Ways"	Ben Knechtel
2019	"Still Gonna Be You"	Ben Knechtel
2020	"Close"	
2021	"All Night to Figure It Out"	Ben Knechtel
2021	"More Drinkin' Than Fishin'" (with Dean Brody)	Ben Knechtel
2022	"She Don't Know"	Ben Knechtel
2022	"Shakin' in Them Boots"	Ben Knechtel

== Awards and nominations ==
Year	Association	Category	Nominated work	Result	Ref
2019	Canadian Country Music Association	Rising Star	—N/a	Won	
2020	Country Music Association of Ontario	Male Artist of the Year	—N/a	Nominated	
2020	Country Music Alberta	Male Artist of the Year	—N/a	Nominated	
2020	Country Music Alberta	Single of the Year	"Lucky"	Nominated	
2021	Juno Awards of 2021	Country Album of the Year	Jade Eagleson	Nominated	
2021	Country Music Association of Ontario	Album of the Year	Jade Eagleson	Nominated	
2021	Country Music Association of Ontario	Fans' Choice	—N/a	Nominated	
2021	Country Music Association of Ontario	Male Artist of the Year	—N/a	Nominated	
2021	2021 Canadian Country Music Awards	Fans' Choice	—N/a	Nominated	
2022	Country Music Association of Ontario	Album of the Year	Honkytonk Revival	Nominated	
2022	Country Music Association of Ontario	Fans' Choice	—N/a	Nominated	
2022	Country Music Association of Ontario	Male Artist of the Year	—N/a	Nominated	
2022	Country Music Association of Ontario	Music Video of the Year	"More Drinkin' Than Fishin'"	Nominated	
2022	Canadian Country Music Association	Album of the Year	Honkytonk Revival	Nominated	
2022	Canadian Country Music Association	Fans' Choice	—N/a	Nominated	
2022	Canadian Country Music Association	Male Artist of the Year	—N/a	Nominated	
2022	Canadian Country Music Association	Single of the Year	"All Night to Figure It Out"	Nominated	
2022	Canadian Country Music Association	Single of the Year	"More Drinkin' Than Fishin'" (with Dean Brody)	Nominated	
2022	Canadian Country Music Association	Video of the Year	"More Drinkin' Than Fishin'" (with Dean Brody)	Nominated	
2022	Canadian Country Music Association	Top Selling Canadian Album of the Year	Honkytonk Revival	Won	
2023	Juno Awards	Country Album of the Year	Honkytonk Revival	Nominated	
2023	Country Music Association of Ontario	Fans' Choice	—N/a	Won	
2023	Country Music Association of Ontario	Single of the Year	"She Don't Know"	Nominated	
2023	Canadian Country Music Association	Entertainer of the Year	—N/a	Won	
2023	Canadian Country Music Association	Fans' Choice	—N/a	Nominated	
2023	Canadian Country Music Association	Innovative Campaign of the Year	"She Don't Know" Wedding Contest	Won	
2023	Canadian Country Music Association	Male Artist of the Year	—N/a	Won	
2023	Canadian Country Music Association	Video of the Year	"She Don't Know"	Nominated	
2024	Juno Awards	Country Album of the Year	Do It Anyway	Nominated	
2024	Country Music Association of Ontario	Album / EP of the Year	Do It Anyway	Nominated	
2024	Country Music Association of Ontario	Fans' Choice	—N/a	Nominated	
2024	Country Music Association of Ontario	Male Artist of the Year	—N/a	Nominated	
2024	Country Music Association of Ontario	Single of the Year	"Rodeo Queen"	Nominated	
2024	Country Music Association of Ontario	Songwriter(s) of the Year	"Rodeo Queen" (with Daryl Scott)	Nominated	
2024	Canadian Country Music Association	Album of the Year	Do It Anyway	Won	
2024	Canadian Country Music Association	Entertainer of the Year	—N/a	Nominated	
2024	Canadian Country Music Association	Fans' Choice	—N/a	Nominated	
2024	Canadian Country Music Association	Innovative Campaign of the Year	Do It Anyway Album Setup & Release Campaign	Nominated	
2024	Canadian Country Music Association	Male Artist of the Year	—N/a	Nominated	
2024	Canadian Country Music Association	Single of the Year	"Rodeo Queen"	Nominated	
2024	Canadian Country Music Association	Songwriter(s) of the Year	"Rodeo Queen" (with Daryl Scott)	Nominated	
2025	Juno Awards	Juno Fan Choice	—N/a	Nominated	
2025	Canadian Country Music Association	Entertainer of the Year	—N/a	Nominated	
2025	Canadian Country Music Association	Fans' Choice	—N/a	Nominated	
2025	Canadian Country Music Association	Male Artist of the Year	—N/a	Won	
2025	Canadian Country Music Association	Musical Collaboration of the Year	"Do It Anyway" (with Jake Worthington)	Nominated	
