= Old Dirt Roads =

2023 single by Owen Riegling

Single by Owen Riegling

from the album Bruce County (From the Beginning)
- Released: August 10, 2023
- Genre: Country
- Length: 3:48
- Label: Universal Canada
- Songwriter: Owen Riegling
- Producer: Brad Hill

Owen Riegling singles chronology
| "Love (The Sweater Song)" (2023) | "Old Dirt Roads" (2023) | "Moonshines" (2024) |

Lyric video
- "Old Dirt Roads" on YouTube

Original cover

"Old Dirt Roads" is a song written and recorded by Canadian country music artist Owen Riegling. The track was produced by Brad Hill. It was the second single off Riegling's debut album Bruce County (From the Beginning).

== Background and release ==
Riegling stated that he wrote "Old Dirt Roads" when he was living in the city to go to school. He remarked that "I was real sick of all the cars and traffic and started reminiscing on home, land, how I grew up. Thinking about my friends and how we used to drive around backroads cause there was nothing else to do". He added that the song "paints the picture of where I grew up and where I currently still live, a place that is a part of me, a place that I plan to settle down and raise kids so they can have the luxury of growing up in a wide open spaces like I did," referring to his hometown of Mildmay, Ontario, where he grew up on a farm.

Riegling originally recorded and released "Old Dirt Roads" as an independent artist in October 2019, with no listed producer. The original version was included on his extended play Empty Room in 2020. In 2023, Riegling re-recorded "Old Dirt Roads" with producer Brad Hill in Nashville, Tennessee, and re-released it as his second single to Canadian country radio on Universal Music Canada.

== Critical reception ==
Taylor Preston of Front Porch Music described "Old Dirt Roads" as an "emotive new song" that is "fueled by strummed acoustic guitar, plucked banjo, and an irresistible chorus hook".

== Live performances ==
In November 2023, Riegling performed "Old Dirt Roads" with an acoustic guitar on the American television channel RFD-TV during an appearance on one of their shows. In February 2024, Riegling performed the song at the 2024 NHL All-Star Game Skills Competition at Scotiabank Arena in Toronto, Ontario. The event was broadcast live on NHL on Sportsnet and TVA Sports in Canada, and on ESPN in the United States, while his performance was later uploaded to YouTube.

== Accolades ==
| Year | Association | Category | Result | Ref |
|---|---|---|---|---|
| 2024 | Country Music Association of Ontario | Single of the Year | Nominated | |
| 2024 | Canadian Country Music Association | Songwriter(s) of the Year | Won | |

== Track listings ==
Digital download – single

1. "Old Dirt Roads" – 3:48
2. "Love (The Sweater Song)" – 2:47

Digital download – single

1. "Old Dirt Roads" (UMusic Live) – 3:53
2. "Old Dirt Roads" – 3:48

== Charts ==
Chart performance for "Old Dirt Roads"
| Chart (2024) | Peak position |
|---|---|
| Canada (Canadian Hot 100) | 69 |
| Canada Country (Billboard) | 2 |

== Certifications ==
| Region | Certification | Certified units/sales |
|---|---|---|
| Canada (Music Canada) | 2× Platinum | 160,000^{‡} |
^{‡} Sales+streaming figures based on certification alone.
