= Raised by a Good Time =

Single by Steven Lee Olsen
- Released: November 10, 2014
- Recorded: April–November 2014
- Genre: Country
- Length: 3:13
- Label: Sony Music; Columbia Nashville
- Songwriter(s): Steven Lee Olsen; Chris Stevens; Cary Barlowe
- Producer(s): Clint Lagerberg

Steven Lee Olsen singles chronology
"Never Done It Like This" (2013)	"Raised by a Good Time" (2014)	"Just Like Love" (2015)

"Raised by a Good Time" is a song co-written and recorded by Canadian country music singer Steven Lee Olsen. It was released to digital retailers on November 10, 2014 through Sony Music Entertainment and Columbia Nashville as the lead single for his forthcoming debut studio album. The song serves as Olsen's major-label debut as well as his first release in the American country market. It reached the top 5 on the Canada Country chart and was certified Gold by Music Canada.

== Background ==
After a decade of songwriting in Nashville and releasing music on an indie label (RKG) in Canada since 2009, Olsen signed a record deal with Columbia Nashville and began working on his debut studio album. Around the same time, one of his songs ("Cold Like That") was recorded by popular country music singer Garth Brooks for his 2014 "comeback" album, Man Against Machine. "Raised by a Good Time" is the first release from these recordings.

Described by critics as "autobiographical," the song is influenced by the writers' personal experiences with teenage misbehavior. Writing for the song developed out of a conversation between the three (Olsen, Chris Stevens, and Cary Barlowe) about the "stupid things we did" in their youth, according to Olsen, "[about] how much fun we had and just hell we raised."

== Commercial performance ==
"Raised by a Good Time" entered the Billboard Canadian Hot 100 at number 84 on the chart dated January 24, 2015. The song reached its peak position of 58 in its tenth week, on the chart dated March 28, 2015. It also debuted at number 43 on the Canada Country airplay chart dated December 27, 2014 and reached a peak position of 3 on the chart dated March 28, 2015. "Raised by a Good Time" was certified Gold by Music Canada in August 2015, indicating digital sales of over 40,000 copies. In January 2024, it was certified Platinum.

In the US, "Raised by a Good Time" was the most-added song on country radio the week of its release (December 1, 2014). The song debuted at number 59 on the Billboard Country Airplay chart dated December 27, 2014. It peaked two positions higher, at number 57, on the chart dated January 17, 2015.

== Music video ==
The accompanying music video for "Raised by a Good Time" was directed by Mason Dixon and premiered March 19, 2015 through Rolling Stone. It contains performance footage of Olsen and his backing band as well as scenes depicting "the recklessness of teen rebellion," including sneaking out of the house, flirting with strangers, and bonfires.

== Charts and certifications ==
=== Weekly charts ===
Chart (2014–15)	Peak position
Canada (Canadian Hot 100)	58
Canada Country (Billboard)	3
US Country Airplay (Billboard)	57

=== Certifications ===
Region	Certification	Certified units/sales
Canada (Music Canada)	Platinum	80,000^{‡}
^{‡} Sales+streaming figures based on certification alone.

== Release history ==
Country	Date	Format	Label	Ref.
Canada	November 10, 2014	Digital download	Sony Music Entertainment	
United States	November 10, 2014	Digital download	Columbia Records Nashville	
United States	December 1, 2014	Country radio	Columbia Records Nashville	
