= All Night to Figure It Out =

2021 song by Jade Eagleson

Single by Jade Eagleson

from the album Honkytonk Revival
- Released: February 12, 2021
- Genre: Country; country rock
- Length: 2:50
- Label: JEM; Starseed
- Songwriters: Ben Stennis; Brad Rempel; Jeremy Spillman
- Producer: Todd Clark

Jade Eagleson singles chronology
"Close" (2020)	"All Night to Figure It Out" (2021)	"More Drinkin' Than Fishin'" (2021)

Music video
- "All Night to Figure It Out" on YouTube

"All Night to Figure It Out" is a song recorded by Canadian country artist Jade Eagleson. The song was written by Ben Stennis, Brad Rempel, and Jeremy Spillman. It was the lead single off Eagleson's second studio album Honkytonk Revival. American country artist Dierks Bentley later recorded the song on the extended version of his 2025 album Broken Branches.

== Background ==
Fellow Canadian country artist Brad Rempel of High Valley co-wrote the song, and sent it to Eagleson, who said he knew he wanted to record it as soon as he heard it. Eagleson said the song caused him to "venture outside my vocal comfort zone" and that producer Todd Clark helped him push his ability past what he believed he was capable of.

== Critical reception ==
Jenna Weishar of Front Porch Music said the song is "flirty" and "fun", adding that it "very easily gets stuck in your head". Nanci Dagg of Canadian Beats Media called it a "bold track that marks a new direction for Eagleson". Matthew Weaver of Corus Radio referred to the track as "a banger".

== Accolades ==
Year	Association	Category	Result	Ref
2022	CCMA	Single Of The Year	Nominated	

== Commercial performance ==
"All Night to Figure It Out" reached a peak of Number One on the Billboard Canada Country chart for the week of July 3, 2021, becoming Eagleson's second career chart-topper after "Lucky". It peaked at number 67 on the Canadian Hot 100 in the same week, marking a new highest charting entry for Eagleson there. It has been certified Gold by Music Canada.

== Music video ==
The official music video for "All Night to Figure It Out" was directed by Ben Knechtel and premiered on ET Canada on March 17, 2021. It features several men learning how to choreograph a dance, and then performing it for their unsuspecting wives.

== Charts ==
Chart performance for "All Night to Figure It Out"
Chart (2021)	Peak position
Canada (Canadian Hot 100)	67
Canada Country (Billboard)	1

== Certifications ==
Region	Certification	Certified units/sales
Canada (Music Canada)	Gold	40,000^{‡}
^{‡} Sales+streaming figures based on certification alone.
