= Steven Lee Olsen =

Canadian musician (born 1985)

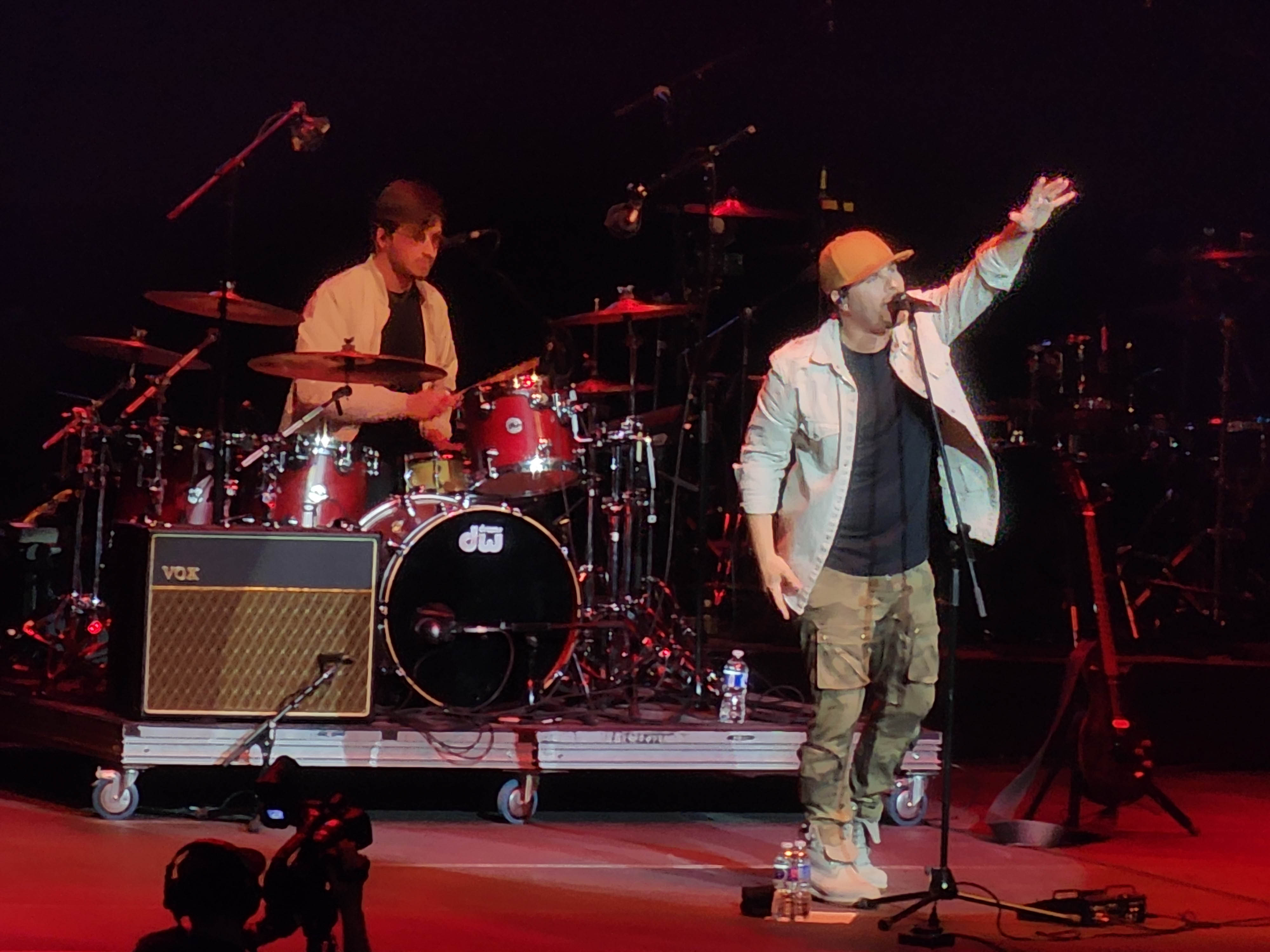
- Olsen (right) performing in 2023

Background information
- Also known as: Steven Lee Tassone; Steven Mark Olsen
- Born: November 25, 1985 (age 40); Scarborough, Ontario, Canada
- Origin: Newmarket, Ontario, Canada
- Genre: Country
- Occupation: Singer-songwriter
- Instrument: Vocals
- Years active: 2008–present
- Labels: Starseed; Neslo; Universal Canada; The Core; SLO Circus; The Orchard; Columbia Nashville; RGK
- Website: www.stevenleeolsen.com

Steven Lee Olsen (born November 25, 1985) is a Canadian country music artist and songwriter. He is best known for his singles "Raised by a Good Time" and "Outta Yours", as well as for co-writing the Grammy-nominated single "Blue Ain't Your Color" by Keith Urban.

Olsen has also written songs for singers such as Craig Morgan, Garth Brooks, Dallas Smith, Rascal Flatts, The Judds, Kip Moore, Brett Kissel, and Kevin Borg.

== Career ==
He released his debut single "Now" in 2009, which was included on his 2009 debut album Introducing Steven Lee Olsen, released on RGK Records, . He followed his debut single with the release of another single "Make Hay While the Sun Shines". Olsen toured in the 2009 CMT on Tour Live show, along with Jason Blaine, Tara Oram and The Higgins.

In April 2014, Olsen signed with Columbia Nashville. Later that year, he released his major-label debut single, "Raised by a Good Time", which was certified Gold by Music Canada in August 2015. He released the album Timing Is Everything on his own label SLO Circus Records in 2018.

In 2021, Olsen signed a joint record deal with Universal Music Canada and The Core Entertainment, and released the extended play Relationship Goals, which included the 2021 CFL Song of the Year, "What You're Made Of". In early 2023, he released the single "Outta Yours" and joined the Canadian leg of Old Dominion's "No Bad Vibes Tour" as an opening act. "Outta Yours" would chart on the Canadian Hot 100, marking a return to the chart for Olsen after nine years.

In July 2023, Olsen made his debut performance at the Grand Ole Opry in Nashville, Tennessee. In August 2023, he released the single "Out Here" concurrently with the announcement of his new distribution deal with independent label Starseed Records. He followed that up with "Bigger Than This Town" in April 2024, which is slated to be included on an album of the same name. In early 2025, Olsen embarked on his headlining "Country Night in Canada" tour across Canada, with JoJo Mason as the opening act.

== Tours ==
- Country Night in Canada Tour (2025)

== Discography ==
=== EPs ===
Title	Details
Introducing Steven Lee Olsen	Release date: May 30, 2009; Label: RGK
Timing Is Everything	Release date: November 9, 2018; Label: SLO Circus
Relationship Goals	Release date: July 30, 2021; Label: The Core / Universal Canada
The Shop Sessions (Volume 1) - Acoustic	Release date: September 27, 2024; Label: Starseed Records

=== Singles ===
List of singles, with selected chart positions and certifications
Year	Title	Peak chart positions			Certifications	Album
Year	Title	CAN	CAN Country	US Country Airplay	Certifications	Album
2009	"Now"	—	19	—		Introducing Steven Lee Olsen
2009	"Make Hay While the Sun Shines"	96	12	—		Non-album singles
2013	"Never Done It Like This"	86	17	—		Non-album singles
2014	"Raised by a Good Time"	58	3	57	MC: Platinum	Non-album singles
2015	"Just Like Love"	—	14	—		Non-album singles
2018	"Timing Is Everything"	—	43	—		Timing Is Everything
2019	"Hello Country"	—	10	—		Non-album singles
2020	"Can't Not"	—	23	—		Non-album singles
2021	"Relationship Goals"	—	6	—		Relationship Goals
2022	"Nashville or Nothing"	—	21	—		Non-album singles
2023	"Outta Yours"	86	5	—	MC: Gold	Non-album singles
2023	"Out Here"	—	7	—		TBA
2024	"Bigger Than This Town"	—	5	—		TBA
2024	"Never Not Care" (featuring Mickey Guyton)	—	24	—		TBA
"—" denotes releases that did not chart

=== Christmas singles ===
Year	Single	Album
2021	"Christmas is Hitting Me Different"	Non-album single

=== Music videos ===
Year	Video	Director
2009	"Now"	James Wilkes
2010	"Make Hay While the Sun Shines"	
2013	"Never Done It Like This"	
2015	"Raised by a Good Time"	Mason Dixon
2019	"Hello Country"	Justin Mrusek
2021	"Relationship Goals"	Taylor Kelly
2021	"What You're Made Of"	
2022	"Nashville or Nothing"	

== Awards and nominations ==
Year	Association	Category	Nominated work	Result	Ref.
2015	Canadian Country Music Association	Rising Star	—N/a	Nominated	
2021	Country Music Association of Ontario	Fans' Choice	—N/a	Nominated	
2022	Country Music Association of Ontario	Single of the Year	"Relationship Goals"	Nominated	
2022	Country Music Association of Ontario	Songwriter(s) of the Year	"Relationship Goals" (with Brandon Day and Ava Suppelsa)	Won	
2022	CCMA	Video of the Year	"Relationship Goals"	Nominated	
2023	Country Music Association of Ontario	Fans' Choice	—N/a	Nominated	
2023	Country Music Association of Ontario	Songwriter(s) of the Year	"Nashville or Nothing" (with Brandon Day)	Won	
2024	Canadian Country Music Association	Fans' Choice	—N/a	Nominated	
2024	Canadian Country Music Association	Single of the Year	"Outta Yours"	Nominated	
2025	Country Music Association of Ontario	Fans' Choice	—N/a	Nominated	
