= Telluride (Jade Eagleson song) =

2024 single by Jade Eagleson

Single by Jade Eagleson

from the album Do It Anyway
- Released: January 8, 2024
- Genre: Country; traditional country
- Length: 2:38
- Label: Starseed
- Songwriters: Blake Pendergrass; John Pierce; Travis Wood
- Producer: Todd Clark

Jade Eagleson singles chronology
"Rodeo Queen" (2023)	"Telluride" (2024)	"Do It Anyway" (2024)

Visualizer
- "Telluride" on YouTube

"Telluride" is a song recorded by Canadian country music artist Jade Eagleson. The song was written by Travis Wood, Blake Pendergrass, and John Pierce, and produced by Todd Clark. The song was released to Canadian country radio in January 2024 as the third single off Eagleson's third studio album Do It Anyway. The song reached number one on the Mediabase Canada Country chart.

== Background ==
Eagleson remarked that fellow Canadian country songwriter Travis Wood had texted him demos of "a bunch of songs" about one month prior to when he began recording his album Do It Anyway. Wood asked Eagleson to him to let him know which ones he would like to record. When he saw the title "Telluride," he said he was "convinced it was going to be about a girl that was left in Telluride and how the narrator couldn't wait to get back to her". After listening to it, he was very impressed hearing the "twist" of the narrator telling the girl to "ride away" from an unsatisfactory relationship. He described the songwriters as "masterclass", and stated that he was "very glad" they allowed him to record the song.

== Critical reception ==
James Daykin of Entertainment Focus favourably spoke of the track, stating that it "showcases the lyrical prowess of writers John Pierce, Blake Pendergrass and Travis Wood," noting their "clever wordplay" and "smooth melodies". He referred to it as a "stand out" amidst many "impressive" songs on Eagleson's album.

== Live performance ==
In February 2024, Eagleson appeared on CityTV's program Breakfast Television and performed "Telluride" live on the air.

== Charts ==
Chart performance for "Telluride"
Chart (2024)	Peak position
Canada Country (Billboard)	2
