= More Drinkin' Than Fishin' =

2021 single by Jade Eagleson and Dean Brody

Single by Jade Eagleson and Dean Brody

from the album Honkytonk Revival
- Released: July 23, 2021
- Genre: Country
- Length: 2:23
- Label: JEM; Starseed
- Songwriters: Gavin Slate; Stuart Walker; Jenna Walker; Travis Wood
- Producer: Todd Clark

Jade Eagleson singles chronology
"All Night to Figure It Out" (2021)	"More Drinkin' Than Fishin'" (2021)	"She Don't Know" (2022)

Dean Brody singles chronology
"Lightning Bug" (2021)	"More Drinkin' Than Fishin'" (2021)	"I'd Go to Jail" (2021)

Music video
- "More Drinkin' Than Fishin'" on YouTube

"More Drinkin' Than Fishin'" is a song recorded by Canadian country artists Jade Eagleson and Dean Brody. The song was written by Stuart Walker and Jenna Walker of The Reklaws with Gavin Slate and Travis Wood. It is the second single off Eagleson's second studio album Honkytonk Revival.

== Background ==
Eagleson called Brody an "incredible mentor" to him, saying he was "grateful" to have Brody join him on the track. In return, Brody said he was "proud to be invited along for the ride" and looking forward to being able to sing the song live together. The two also participated in a "who is more country" competition over social media in support of the song, which included commentary from fellow Canadian country artists Brett Kissel, Jojo Mason, Tyler Joe Miller, the Reklaws, and Meghan Patrick.

== Critical reception ==
Joshua Murray of The Reviews Are In stated that Eagleson and Brody's voices work well together, adding that they "sing with the same distinct sound and vibe we know”. Kerry Doole of FYI Music News called the song a "good ole boy anthem", saying it "has the feel of a seasonal hit". Top Country named the song their "Pick of the Week" for July 25, 2021, describing it as the "feel-good single of the summer/year". ET Canada described it as "the ultimate new country anthem".

== Accolades ==
Year	Association	Category	Result	Ref
2022	Country Music Association of Ontario	Video of the Year	Nominated	
2022	Country Music Association of Ontario	Songwriter(s) of the Year	Nominated	
2022	CCMA	Single Of The Year	Nominated	

== Commercial performance ==
"More Drinkin' Than Fishin'" peaked at number one on the Billboard Canada Country chart for week of December 11, 2021, marking Eagleson's third number one and Brody's seventh number one. It also peaked at number 81 on the Canadian Hot 100 for the same week. The song has been certified Gold by Music Canada.

== Music video ==
The official music video for "More Drinkin' Than Fishin'" was directed by Ben Knechtel and premiered on August 11, 2021.

== Charts ==
Chart performance for "More Drinkin' Than Fishin'"
Chart (2021)	Peak position
Canada (Canadian Hot 100)	81
Canada Country (Billboard)	1

== Certifications ==
Region	Certification	Certified units/sales
Canada (Music Canada)	Gold	40,000^{‡}
^{‡} Sales+streaming figures based on certification alone.
