= Lucky (Jade Eagleson song) =

2019 song by Jade Eagleson

Single by Jade Eagleson

from the album Jade Eagleson
- Released: October 11, 2019
- Genre: Country
- Length: 3:18
- Label: Universal Canada
- Songwriter(s): Jade Eagleson; Todd Clark; Gavin Slate; Travis Wood
- Producer(s): Todd Clark; Gavin Slate

Jade Eagleson singles chronology
"Count the Ways" (2019)	"Lucky" (2019)	"Close" (2020)

Lyric Video
- "Lucky" on YouTube

"Lucky" is a song co-written and recorded by Canadian country artist Jade Eagleson. The track was co-written with Travis Wood, as well as the track's producers Todd Clark and Gavin Slate. It was the third single from Eagleson's debut self-titled album Jade Eagleson, and became his first #1 on the Canada Country chart. It was nominated for "Single of the Year" at the 2020 Country Music Alberta Awards.

== Critical reception ==
Katie Colley of ET Canada called the song "catchy".

== Track listings ==
Digital download - single

1. "Lucky" – 3:18
2. "Good Country People" – 3:23

== Chart performance ==
"Lucky" peaked at number one on the Billboard Canada Country chart for the week of March 21, 2020, giving Eagleson his first number-one hit. The song was the most-played domestic song on Canadian country radio in 2020.

Chart (2020)	Peak position
Canada Country (Billboard)	1

== Certifications ==
Region	Certification	Certified units/sales
Canada (Music Canada)	Gold	40,000^{‡}
^{‡} Sales+streaming figures based on certification alone.
