= 2024 Canadian Country Music Association Awards =

Music awards in Canada

- Date: September 14, 2024
- Venue: Rogers Place; Edmonton, Alberta
- Hosted by: Thomas Rhett and MacKenzie Porter
- Most wins: Josh Ross (5)
- Most nominations: Jade Eagleson; MacKenzie Porter; (6 each)

Television/radio coverage
- Network: CTV

The 2024 Canadian Country Music Association Awards, honouring achievements in Canadian country music, were presented on September 14, 2024, at Rogers Place in Edmonton, Alberta. For the second year in a row, they were broadcast by CTV over its television network, website, and mobile app.

The ceremony was hosted by co-hosted by Canadian country singer and actress MacKenzie Porter and American country singer and songwriter Thomas Rhett, both of whom performed during the show. There were also performances by Jade Eagleson, Brett Kissel, The Reklaws, Dallas Smith, Dasha, Madeline Merlo, Owen Riegling, Tenille Townes, Jake Worthington, and Josh Ross with Julia Michaels. Additionally, k.d. lang and The Reclines performed together for the first time in 35 years in commemoration of lang's induction into the Canadian Country Music Hall of Fame.

Nominees were announced on July 18. Jade Eagleson and MacKenzie Porter tied for the most nominations with six each. Josh Ross won the most awards, with five in total.

== Nominees and winners ==
=== Music ===
Entertainer of the Year	Album of the Year
Josh Ross; Jade Eagleson; MacKenzie Porter; The Reklaws; Owen Riegling	Jade Eagleson, Do It Anyway; Josh Ross, Complicated; Dallas Smith, Dallas Smith; MacKenzie Porter, Nobody's Born with a Broken Heart; Tyler Joe Miller, Spillin' My Truth
Male Artist of the Year	Female Artist of the Year
Josh Ross; Dean Brody; Jade Eagleson; Owen Riegling; Dallas Smith	MacKenzie Porter; Lindsay Ell; Madeline Merlo; Tenille Townes; Alli Walker
Group or Duo of the Year	Single of the Year
James Barker Band; High Valley; Hunter Brothers; The Reklaws; The Washboard Union	Josh Ross, "Trouble"; MacKenzie Porter, "Chasing Tornadoes"; James Barker Band, "Meet Your Mama"; Steven Lee Olsen, "Outta Yours"; Jade Eagleson, "Rodeo Queen"
Breakthrough Artist or Group of the Year	Fans' Choice
Owen Riegling; Hailey Benedict; Dax; Teigen Gayse; Matt Lang	James Barker Band; Dean Brody; Jade Eagleson; High Valley; Tyler Joe Miller; Steven Lee Olsen; MacKenzie Porter; The Reklaws; Josh Ross; Dallas Smith
Alternative Country Album of the Year	Musical Collaboration of the Year
Brett Kissel, The Compass Project - West Album; The Western Swing Authority, 12 to 6 Central; Bahamas, BOOTCUT; William Prince, Stand in the Joy; JJ Shiplett, A Way Through Time	The Reklaws with Drake Milligan, "Honky Tonkin' About"; Chris Buck Band feat. Gord Bamford, "Cowboy Boots"; Dallas Smith feat. Shawn Austin, "Day After Day"; Tim and the Glory Boys feat. High Valley, "Take Me Backroad"; Brett Kissel with Cooper Alan, "Two of Us"
Songwriter of the Year	Video of the Year
Owen Riegling — Owen Riegling, "Old Dirt Roads"; Aaron Goodvin, Catt Gravitt, Skip Black — Aaron Goodvin, "Country Dance"; Sacha Visagie, Shawn Chambliss, Jake Saghi — Sacha, "Hey Mom I Made It"; Jade Eagleson, Daryl Scott — Jade Eagleson, "Rodeo Queen"; Tony Stevens, Dan Swinimer, Wes Mack, David Borys - Tony Stevens, "Whiskey in Colorado"	MacKenzie Porter, "Chasing Tornadoes"; The Reklaws with. Drake Milligan, "Honky Tonkin' About"; Tim and the Glory Boys feat. High Valley, "Take Me Backroad"; The Prairie States, "Trouble Is"; Brett Kissel with Cooper Alan, "Two of Us"
Guitar Player of the Year	Bass Player of the Year
Chris Bray; Brennan Wall; Russell Broom; Jay Buettner; Ryan Davidson	Lisa Jacobs; Lisa Dodd; Justin Kudding; Ben Miller; Holt Stuart-Hitchcox
Steel Guitar Player of the Year	Drummer of the Year
Matt McKay; Chris Altmann; Doug Johnson; Kevin Neal; Marcus Ramsay	Rich DaSilva; Matthew Atkins; Spencer Cheyne; Flavio Cirillo; Brendan Lyons
Fiddle Player of the Year	Keyboard Player of the Year
Linsey Beckett; Tyler Beckett; Denis Dufresne; Julie Kennedy; Mike Sanyshyn	Brendan Waters; Matt Koebel; Brendon Schmidt
Specialty Instrument Player of the Year	Top Selling Canadian Single of the Year
Shane Guse; Denis Dufresne; Johnny Gasparic; Mitch Jay	Josh Ross, Trouble
Top Selling Canadian Album of the Year	Top Selling International Album
Josh Ross, Complicated	Morgan Wallen, One Thing at a Time

=== Radio ===
Radio Station of the Year, Large Market	Radio Station of the Year, Medium/Small Market
CFCW — Edmonton, Alberta; CHKX-FM — Hamilton, Ontario; CJJR-FM — Vancouver, British Columbia; CJKX-FM — Oshawa, Ontario; CKKL-FM — Ottawa, Ontario	CKGY-FM — Red Deer, Alberta; CFWC-FM — Brantford, Ontario; CHCQ-FM — Belleville, Ontario; CJGX-940 — Yorkton, Saskatchewan; CKXC-FM — Kingston, Ontario
Radio Personality of the Year
Jackie Rae Greening, CFCW-FM; Wendy Boomer, CKBY-FM; Dan Davidson and Stella Stevens, CFCW-FM; Shannon Ella, Pure Country; Gregg Reynolds and Josie Balka, CKRY-FM

=== Industry ===
Booking Agency of the Year	Country Club of the Year
Paquin Entertainment Group; Fame Group Agency; The Feldman Agency; Invictus Entertainment Group; Sakamoto Agency	The King Eddy — Calgary, Alberta; Cook County Saloon — Edmonton, Alberta; Ranchman's Cookhouse and Dancehall — Calgary, Alberta
Country Festival, Fair or Exhibition of the Year	Country Music Program or Special of the year
Boots and Hearts Music Festival — Oro-Medonte, Ontario; Big Valley Jamboree — Camrose, Alberta; Calgary Stampede — Calgary, Alberta; Cavendish Beach Music Festival — Cavendish, Prince Edward Island; LASSO Montreal — Montreal, Quebec	Boomer's Canadian Club (Rogers Sports & Media); Heartstrings & Honkytonks (CFCW & SILVERFLOW Productions); Home for the Holidays with High Valley (Sony Music Entertainment (Canada) Inc.); Jess Moskaluke's Winter Wonderland Radio Special (Gunfighter Productions); A Washboard Union Christmas Special (Washboard Union Prod Inc)
Management Company of the Year	Music Publishing Company of the Year
The Core Entertainment; Big Loud Management; Invictus Entertainment; Starseed Entertainment; Willing Entertainment	Big Loud Publishing; Anthem Entertainment Group; Sony Music Publishing; Universal Music Publishing; Warner Chappell Music Canada
Record Company of the Year	Industry Person of the Year
Big Loud Records; Sony Music Entertainment (Canada) Inc.; Starseed Records; Universal Music Canada; Warner Music Canada	Lindsay Hyslop (BBR Music Group); Warren Copnick (Sony Music Entertainment (Canada) Inc); Amanda Kingsland (Universal Music Canada); Samantha Pickard (Strut Entertainment); Bobby Wills (Willing Entertainment)
Creative Team or Director of the Year	Recording Studio of the Year
Bronwin Parks (Feisty Creative); Dan Davidson, Travis Nesbitt; Kyle McKearney, Roberta Landreth, Chris Doi, Jeff Ojeda; Mitchell Nevins; Michelle Spice, Joanne Howard (Michelle Spice Photography & Small Dog Design)	MCC Recording Studio — Calgary, Alberta; 80A Studios — Toronto, Ontario; Barrytone Studios — Miramichi, New Brunswick; OCL Studios — Chestermere, Alberta; Revolution Recording — Toronto, Ontario
Record Producer of the Year	Retailer or Commercial Platform of the Year
Joey Moi — Dallas Smith, Dallas Smith and Morgan Wallen, One Thing at a Time; Jeff Dalziel — New Moon Junction, "Mind of Its Own" and Dan Davidson, "Won't Forget"; Danick Dupelle — Tyler Joe Miller, Spillin' My Truth, "Broken Man" and Tebey, "Hold Your Horses"; Gavin Slate — Karli June, "Feel Like Home"; Dan Swinimer - Elyse Saunders, "Never Have I Ever" and Tony Stevens, "Whiskey in Colorado"	Apple Music; Amazon Music; Spotify Canada Inc.
Talent Buyer or Promoter of the Year	Video Director of the Year
Brooke Dunford (Republic Live); Paul Biro (Sakamoto Agency); Dan Clapson (Blue Jay Sessions); Jim Cressman (Invictus Entertainment Group); Adam Oppenheim (Stampede Entertainment)	Ryan Nolan; Stephano Barberis; Ben Knechtel, Chad Tennies, Mac Grant; Codi McIvor; Travis Nesbitt
Innovative Campaign of the Year	Gary Slaight Music Humanitarian Award
"Blinding Lights" Case Study — Tebey; "Country Dance" Line Dane Campaign — Aaron Goodvin; Do It Anyway Album Setup & Release Campaign — Jade Eagleson; Festival Launch Campaign — Boots and Hearts Music Festival; Right Round Here Album Setup & Release Campaign, Canadian Tour of the Same Name — Dean Brody	Lindsay Ell — The Make You Movement

== See also ==
- 2024 in Canadian music
- 2024 in country music
