= Jade Eagleson (album) =

2020 studio album by Jade Eagleson

Studio album by Jade Eagleson
- Released: July 24, 2020
- Studio: The Slam Factory (Toronto, Ontario)
- Genre: Country
- Length: 35:46
- Label: Umusic
- Producer: Todd Clark; Gavin Slate

Jade Eagleson chronology
Jade Eagleson (EP) (2018)	Jade Eagleson (2020)	Honkytonk Revival (2021)

Singles from Jade Eagleson
- 1. "Got Your Name on It" Released: May 18, 2018; 2. "Count the Ways" Released: February 15, 2019; 3. "Lucky" Released: October 11, 2019; 4. "Close" Released: April 24, 2020

Jade Eagleson is the self-titled, debut studio album by Canadian country music artist Jade Eagleson. It was released on July 24, 2020 through Universal Music Canada. The album includes the #1 Canada Country hit "Lucky", the Platinum-certified hits "Got Your Name on It" and "Count the Ways", as well as "Close". It was the most globally-streamed debut album for a Canadian country artist of all-time.

== Background ==
Due to the COVID-19 pandemic, most artists were unable to release an album and support it with a tour. Despite this, Eagleson decided to release his debut album regardless, saying that the fans were "already losing out on so much with live shows not being around… It’s kind of a gift to [them]". Eagleson remarked that he felt "lucky" to have been able to record songs co-written by Chris Stapleton and Brad Rempel of High Valley on this album, while he co-wrote the other 8 tracks himself.

== Critical reception ==
Joshua Murray and Trish Cassling of The Reviews Are In referred to the album as a "good country music listen" adding that listeners can "celebrate [it] as part of the next wave of talent coming from north of the border". Kim Hughes of Parton and Pearl stated that the album "cements [Eagleson's] status" as the "heir apparent" in "authentic country music".

== Track listing ==
Jade Eagleson
No.	Title	Writer(s)	Length
1.	"Close"	Jade Eagleson; Todd Clark; Gavin Slate; Travis Wood	3:04
2.	"Boom Town"	Lee Miller; Chris Stapleton	4:14
3.	"Hackin' Darts"	Eagleson; Daryl Scott; Jesse Slack	2:58
4.	"Little Less Lonely"	Eagleson; Slate; Wood	2:52
5.	"Whiskey Tonight"	Eagleson; Griffen Palmer	3:07
6.	"Lucky"	Eagleson; Clark; Slate; Wood	3:18
7.	"Still Gonna Be You"	Eagleson; Clark; Slate; Wood	3:21
8.	"Good Country People"	Tommy Cecil; Phil O'Donnell; Brad Rempel	3:23
9.	"Got Your Name on It"	Eagleson; Clark; Slate; Wood	3:09
10.	"Count the Ways"	Eagleson; Clark; Slate; Wood	3:15
11.	"Got Your Name on It" (acoustic)	Eagleson; Clark; Slate; Wood	2:58
Total length:			35:46

== Charts ==
=== Singles ===
Year	Single	Peak positions		Certifications
Year	Single	CAN Country	CAN	Certifications
2018	"Got Your Name on It"	6	90	MC: Platinum
2019	"Count the Ways"	4	—	MC: Platinum
2019	"Lucky"	1	—	MC: Gold
2020	"Close"	8	88	MC: Gold
"—" denotes releases that did not chart

== Awards and nominations ==
Year	Association	Category	Nominated work	Result	Ref
2020	Country Music Alberta	Single of the Year	"Lucky"	Nominated	
2021	Juno Awards	Country Album of the Year	Jade Eagleson	Nominated	

== Release history ==
Release formats for Jade Eagleson
Country	Date	Format	Label	Ref.
Various	July 24, 2020	Digital download	Universal Music Canada	
Various	July 24, 2020	Streaming	Universal Music Canada	
Various	November 6, 2020	Compact disc	Universal Music Canada	
