= Relationship Goals (song) =

2021 song by Steven Lee Olsen

Single by Steven Lee Olsen

from the EP Relationship Goals
- Released: July 30, 2021
- Genre: Country pop
- Length: 2:48 (song); 13:48 (EP)
- Label: The Core / Universal Canada
- Songwriters: Steven Lee Olsen; Brandon Day; Ava Suppelsa
- Producers: Steven Lee Olsen; Brandon Day

Steven Lee Olsen singles chronology
"Can't Not" (2020)	"Relationship Goals" (2021)	"Nashville or Nothing" (2022)

Music video
- "Relationship Goals" on YouTube

"Relationship Goals" is a song co-written, co-produced, and recorded by Canadian country artist Steven Lee Olsen. The song was written with Brandon Day and Ava Suppelsa. It was the lead single off his extended play Relationship Goals, the first release from a joint venture between The Core Entertainment and Universal Music Canada.

== Critical reception ==
Angela Stefano of The Boot stated that "Relationship Goals" "lays out the singer and songwriter's hopes in love", noting heavy use of the guitar and "traces" of steel guitar. Country100 named the track their "Fresh Music Friday Song of the Day" for August 13, 2021. CTV's etalk noted a video of Olsen singing the song to his dog, describing the song as being "about puppy love". Katie Colley of ET Canada referred to the track as a "catchy new single".

== Accolades ==
Year	Association	Category	Result	Ref
2022	CCMA	Video of the Year	Nominated	

== Music video ==
The official music video for "Relationship Goals" was directed by Taylor Kelly and premiered on August 25, 2021. It was filmed and shot in Nashville, Tennessee, at a backyard pool party. The video features eleven different Easter eggs.

== Track listings ==
Digital download - EP

No.	Title	Writer(s)	Length
1.	"Relationship Goals"	Steven Lee Olsen; Brandon Day; Ava Suppelsa	2:48
2.	"You Get It"	Olsen; James McNair; Jordan Schmidt	2:29
3.	"Time With Ya"	Olsen; Cary Barlowe; Jesse Frasure	2:18
4.	"You Tell Me"	Olsen; Suppelsa; Blake Hubbard; Jarrod Ingram	3:22
5.	"What You're Made Of"	Olsen	2:50
Total length:			13:48

Digital download - single

1. "Relationship Goals" – 2:47
  (Acoustic Version)

== Charts ==
Chart performance for "Relationship Goals"
Chart (2022)	Peak position
Canada Country (Billboard)	6

== Awards and nominations ==
Year	Association	Category	Nominated work	Result	Ref.
2022	Country Music Association of Ontario	Single of the Year	"Relationship Goals"	Nominated	
2022	Country Music Association of Ontario	Songwriter(s) of the Year	"Relationship Goals" (with Brandon Day and Ava Suppelsa)	Won	
2022	CCMA	Video of the Year	"Relationship Goals"	Nominated	
