= CHCQ-FM =

Radio station in Belleville, Ontario

Coordinates: 44°16′04″N 77°30′46″W

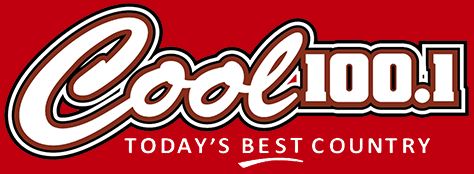
- Belleville, Ontario; Canada
- Broadcast area: Belleville-Quinte West
- Frequency: 100.1 MHz
- Branding: Cool 100

Programming
- Format: Country

Ownership
- Owner: Starboard Communications
- Sister stations: CJOJ-FM

History
- First air date: October 31, 2001

Technical information
- Class: B
- ERP: 21 kWs average 32 kWs peak
- HAAT: 152.5 metres (500 ft)

Links
- Website: cool100.ca

CHCQ-FM is a Canadian radio station, which airs a country format branded as Cool 100 at 100.1 FM in Belleville, Ontario.

== History ==
CHCQ was licensed to Belleville Radio Limited by the CRTC in 2000, and began broadcasting on October 31, 2001, known as Q100. On September 12, 2001, CHCQ Ltd. received CRTC approval to decrease CHCQ's effective radiated power for CHCQ from 40,000 to 21,000 watts, and the relocation of the transmitter site to the northwest of Belleville (Seaway). It was announced in January, 2002, that Belleville Radio Limited was sold to John Sherratt, and its two radio stations would be operated under the new parent company, Starboard Communications. On February 23, 2004, CHCQ underwent a repackaging, and was launched as Today's Best Country, Cool 100.

CHCQ operated from studios and offices at 354 Pinnacle Street in downtown Belleville from October 31, 2001, through January 11, 2010, when it moved to its current location at 497 Dundas St, West, Belleville. This new building was acquired by Starboard Communications on May 1, 2009, and underwent significant renovations to accommodate new, state-of-the-art broadcast facilities.

The current on-air line-up includes Al Lewis and Jenn McKay, hosting "Lewis and McKay" on weekday mornings. Steve Bohan hosts the 10am-2pm midday show. CHCQ Program/Music Director and Vice President of Starboard Communications Paul Ferguson hosts the afternoon drive show. Featured on weekends is "The Casey Clarke Country Countdown". This replaced the long-running "Foxworthy Countdown" in January 2010, after Jeff Foxworthy announced that his countdown show would cease production at the end of 2009.

Starboard Communications also owns and operates CJOJ-FM.
