= 2017 in country music =

This is a list of notable events in country music that took place in 2017.

== Events ==
- April 3 – Luke Bryan's "Fast" reaches No. 1 on Country Airplay, making Bryan the first artist ever to achieve six No. 1 singles from the same album.
- April 11 – Jeff Cook of Alabama announces he will stop touring with the band, after revealing he was diagnosed with Parkinson's disease four years earlier.
- April 23 – The Andrew Johnson Hotel in Knoxville, Tennessee, where Hank Williams stayed December 31, 1952, hours before his death, makes headlines after mayor Tim Burchett announces that Knox County would seek proposals to redevelop the building, sparking re-interest in the circumstances and events surrounding Williams' final hours.
- May 4 – Loretta Lynn suffers a stroke at her Hurricane Mills, Tennessee ranch weeks after celebrating her 85th birthday at the Ryman Auditorium in Nashville, Tennessee. Lynn is said to make a full recovery but postpones numerous shows.
- June 1- Stu Phillips Celebrates his 50th Grand Ole Opry Anniversary
- August – Taylor Swift sues and prevails in a civil trial against David Mueller, a former morning show personality for Denver's KYGO-FM, in connection with an incident in 2013 – when Swift was still touring and being billed as primarily a country music performer – where Swift accused Mueller of sexually assaulting her by groping her at an event. Mueller later sued Swift, accusing her of lying and causing him to be fired from his job at KYGO, but Swift countersued for sexual assault. During the trial, a jury rejects Mueller's claims and rules in favor of Swift. In December, Swift, as a result of the 2013 incident and subsequent civil trial, is one of the "Silence Breakers" named Time's 2017 Person of the Year
- August 12 – "Body Like a Back Road" by Sam Hunt breaks two Billboard Hot Country Songs chart records for No. 1 longevity within a month of each other. On July 22, upon spending its 22nd week at No. 1, "... Back Road" becomes the longest-running No. 1 song by a male solo artist since the start of the charts in 1944, bumping three songs that had been tied for first with 21 weeks: "I'll Hold You in My Heart (Till I Can Hold You in My Arms)" by Eddy Arnold (1947), "I'm Movin' On" by Hank Snow with the Rainbow Ranch Boys (1950), and "In the Jailhouse Now" by Webb Pierce (1955). On August 12, the song's 25th week at No. 1, Hunt bumps Florida Georgia Line's "Cruise" for lengthiest No. 1 run (previously 24 weeks) in chart history; the song eventually logs 34 weeks at No. 1, finally dropping from the top spot (to No. 2) on the chart dated October 21. The song's long-running popularity is attributed in part due to downloads and live streaming, and its No. 6 peak on the Billboard Hot 100 chart, all without a music video for the track.
- September 8 – Troy Gentry, half of the duo Montgomery Gentry, is killed in a helicopter crash in New Jersey.
- September 9 – The radio countdown program American Country Countdown returns to using the Billboard chart as its source after eight years of using the Mediabase chart. The Country Airplay chart is used.
- September 16- Jeannie Seely Celebrates her 50th Grand Ole Opry anniversary
- September 25- Loretta Lynn celebrates her 55th Grand Ole Opry anniversary
- September 29 - Shania Twain releases her first studio album in nearly 15 years, Now.
- October 1 – A mass shooting occurs at the Route 91 Harvest country music festival in Paradise, Nevada, during a closing performance by Jason Aldean. A shooter fired into the crowd from a 32nd-floor balcony of the Mandalay Bay hotel, located to the southeast of the Las Vegas Village outdoor concert venue. Initial reports indicated that more than 50 people had died and more than 400 were wounded, with those numbers expected to rise, and that the gunman was also dead. Aldean was able to escape uninjured and later posts social media messages confirming his safety. Less than a week later, Aldean pays tribute to the victims and others impacted by the events in Las Vegas by appearing on Saturday Night Live, giving words of support before performing Tom Petty's "I Won't Back Down"; the tribute also honors Petty, who died the day after the shooting.
- October 1 – Loretta Lynn returns to the stage after a near 5-month absence from the spotlight after suffering a stroke on May 4, at her Hurricane Mills, Tennessee Ranch. Lynn sung three of her hit songs at a concert at her ranch which include "Coal Miner’s Daughter," "You Ain’t Woman Enough" and "Dear Uncle Sam."

== Top hits of the year ==
The following songs placed within the Top 20 on the Hot Country Songs, Country Airplay, or Canada Country charts in 2017:

=== Singles released by American artists ===
Songs	Airplay	Canada	Single	Artist	References
11	12	17	"80s Mercedes"	Maren Morris	
7	1	2	"All the Pretty Girls"	Kenny Chesney	
5	1	1	"Any Ol' Barstool"	Jason Aldean	
13	1	30	"Ask Me How I Know"	Garth Brooks	
29	15	24	"Baby, Let's Lay Down and Dance"	Garth Brooks	
17	10	2	"Bar at the End of the World"	Kenny Chesney	
1	1	1	"Better Man"	Little Big Town	
4	2	8	"Black"	Dierks Bentley	
1	1	1	"Blue Ain't Your Color"	Keith Urban	
1	1	1	"Body Like a Back Road"	Sam Hunt	
32	20	50	"California"	Big & Rich	
3	1	1	"Craving You"	Thomas Rhett featuring Maren Morris	
18	—	—	"The Dance"	Lauren Duski	
18	29	39	"Dear Hate"	Maren Morris featuring Vince Gill	
4	—	—	"Deja Vu"	Lauren Duski	
2	1	1	"Dirt on My Boots"	Jon Pardi	
3	2	1	"Dirty Laundry"	Carrie Underwood	
5	1	3	"Do I Make You Wanna"	Billy Currington	
4	3	1	"Drinkin' Problem"	Midland	
16	—	—	"Drinkin' Too Much"	Sam Hunt	
17	26	—	"Either Way"	Chris Stapleton	
5	1	1	"Every Little Thing"	Carly Pearce	
8	1	2	"Every Time I Hear That Song"	Blake Shelton	
5	1	1	"Fast"	Luke Bryan	
2	2	2	"The Fighter"	Keith Urban featuring Carrie Underwood	
10	2	4	"Fix a Drink"	Chris Janson	
10	2	4	"Flatliner"	Cole Swindell featuring Dierks Bentley	
17	10	1	"For Her"	Chris Lane	
13	—	—	"Found You"	Kane Brown	
19	—	—	"Ghost in This House"	Lauren Duski	
4	1	3	"God, Your Mama, and Me"	Florida Georgia Line featuring Backstreet Boys	
1	1	2	"Greatest Love Story"	LANco	
3	1	1	"A Guy with a Girl"	Blake Shelton	
5	3	1	"Heartache on the Dance Floor"	Jon Pardi	
25	20	—	"Holdin' Her"	Chris Janson	
5	2	7	"Hometown Girl"	Josh Turner	
9	3	7	"How I'll Always Be"	Tim McGraw	
7	1	25	"How Not To"	Dan + Shay	
3	1	2	"Hurricane"	Luke Combs	
16	—	—	"I Pray"	Red Marlow	
6	1	1	"I'll Name the Dogs"	Blake Shelton	
4	1	23	"If I Told You"	Darius Rucker	
14	6	9	"If the Boot Fits"	Granger Smith	
2	1	1	"In Case You Didn't Know"	Brett Young	
14	12	10	"It Ain't My Fault"	Brothers Osborne	
9	6	2	"Kill a Word"	Eric Church featuring Rhiannon Giddens	
26	19	34	"Last Time for Everything"	Brad Paisley	
4	1	3	"Light It Up"	Luke Bryan	
8	4	3	"More Girls Like You"	Kip Moore	
3	1	13	"My Girl"	Dylan Scott	
10	14	22	"My Old Man"	Zac Brown Band	
4	1	2	"No Such Thing as a Broken Heart"	Old Dominion	
24	10	17	"Outta Style"	Aaron Watson	
12	17	46	"Parachute"	Chris Stapleton	
22	16	35	"Ring on Every Finger"	LoCash	
8	1	3	"Road Less Traveled"	Lauren Alaina	
5	1	4	"Seein' Red"	Dustin Lynch	
2	1	1	"Small Town Boy"	Dustin Lynch	
16	14	11	"Smooth"	Florida Georgia Line	
4	1	3	"Sober Saturday Night"	Chris Young featuring Vince Gill	
9	1	6	"Somebody Else Will"	Justin Moore	
6	19	27	"Speak to a Girl"	Tim McGraw and Faith Hill	
4	1	1	"Star of the Show"	Thomas Rhett	
27	18	44	"There's a Girl"	Trent Harmon	
8	3	2	"They Don't Know"	Jason Aldean	
3	2	23	"Think a Little Less"	Michael Ray	
15	22	50	"Tin Man"	Miranda Lambert	
7	3	5	"Today"	Brad Paisley	
4	1	1	"Unforgettable"	Thomas Rhett	
25	26	20	"We Should Be Friends"	Miranda Lambert	
9	7	18	"The Weekend"	Brantley Gilbert	
1	1	3	"What Ifs"	Kane Brown featuring Lauren Alaina	
1	1	1	"When It Rains It Pours"	Luke Combs	
9	3	2	"Yeah Boy"	Kelsea Ballerini	
8	4	8	"You Look Good"	Lady Antebellum	
13	1	7	"Yours If You Want It"	Rascal Flatts	

=== Singles released by Canadian artists ===
Songs	Airplay	Canada	Single	Artist	References
—	—	9	"All Alright"	Lindsay Ell	
—	—	19	"Barn Burner"	Dan Davidson	
—	—	11	"Be Country with Me"	Meghan Patrick	
—	—	9	"Bonfire"	River Town Saints	
—	—	1	"Chills"	James Barker Band	
—	—	7	"Crazy About You"	The Road Hammers	
—	—	5	"Dear Life"	High Valley	
—	—	3	"Drive Me Away"	Jess Moskaluke	
—	—	13	"Fall in Love If You Want To"	Gord Bamford	
—	—	19	"Get While the Gettin's Good"	Bobby Wills	
—	—	19	"Head Over Heels"	The Washboard Union	
—	—	11	"Homemade"	Cold Creek County	
—	—	16	"Hometown Kids"	Reklaws	
—	—	1	"I Be U Be"	High Valley	
—	—	3	"It's Working"	James Barker Band	
—	—	16	"The Journey"	Paul Brandt	
—	—	10	"Just Got Paid"	Emerson Drive	
—	—	7	"Just Sayin'"	James Barker Band	
—	—	16	"Kill Your Love"	Jess Moskaluke	
—	—	5	"Livin' on Summertime"	Gord Bamford	
—	—	8	"Lonely Drum"	Aaron Goodvin	
—	—	20	"Made for You"	Jojo Mason	
21	17	—	"Make You Mine" (U.S. release)	High Valley	
—	—	14	"Might As Well Be Me"	Chad Brownlee	
—	—	8	"Motel Flamingo"	Madeline Merlo	
—	—	11	"On Me"	Andrew Hyatt	
—	—	17	"Out of the Blue"	Chad Brownlee	
—	—	13	"Over and Over"	Madeline Merlo	
—	—	8	"Paradise Found"	Shawn Austin	
—	—	9	"Shine"	Washboard Union	
—	—	1	"Side Effects"	Dallas Smith	
—	—	1	"Sky Stays This Blue"	Dallas Smith	
—	—	2	"Slide Over"	Tim Hicks	
—	—	9	"Slow Burn"	Tim Hicks	
—	—	18	"Soggy Bottom Summer"	Dean Brody featuring Alan Doyle	
—	—	8	"Something to Wrap My Heart Around"	Jojo Mason	
—	—	7	"Something We Shouldn't Do"	Chad Brownlee	
—	—	10	"Still Loving You"	Meghan Patrick	
—	—	19	"That's When You Know"	Chris Buck Band featuring Kira Isabella	
—	—	2	"Time"	Dean Brody	
—	42	4	"Waiting on You"	Lindsay Ell	
—	—	4	"We Were That Song"	Brett Kissel	
—	—	5	"When a Momma's Boy Meets a Daddy's Girl"	Aaron Pritchett	

=== Notes ===
- "—" denotes releases that did not chart

== Top new album releases ==
The following albums placed on the Top Country Albums charts in 2017:

US	Album	Artist	Record label	Release date
7	Adiós	Glen Campbell	Universal Music	June 9
10	American Rebelution	The Lacs	Backroad-Average Joe's	April 7
1	The Anthology: Part 1, The First Five Years	Garth Brooks	Pearl	November 17
2	Back to Us	Rascal Flatts	Big Machine	May 19
6	Boom	Walker Hayes	Monument	December 8
1	The Breaker	Little Big Town	Capitol Nashville	February 24
1	Brett Eldredge	Brett Eldredge	Atlantic Nashville	August 4
2	Brett Young	Brett Young	BMLG	February 10
6	The Bus Songs	Toby Keith	Show Dog-Universal	September 8
2	Current Mood	Dustin Lynch	Broken Bow	September 8
1	Deep South	Josh Turner	MCA Nashville	March 10
1	The Devil Don't Sleep	Brantley Gilbert	Valory Music Group	January 27
2	Did It for the Party	Big & Rich	Big & Rich/Thirty Tigers	September 15
5	Dirty South	Lucas Hoge	Rebel Engine Entertainment	July 21
7	Everybody	Chris Janson	Warner Bros. Nashville	September 22
4	Every Little Thing	Carly Pearce	Big Machine	October 13
1	From A Room: Volume 1	Chris Stapleton	Mercury Nashville	May 5
1	From A Room: Volume 2	Chris Stapleton	Mercury Nashville	December 1
1	God's Problem Child	Willie Nelson	Legacy	April 28
5	Gold	Jessie James Decker	Epic Records	February 17
1	Happy Endings	Old Dominion	RCA Nashville	August 25
1	Heart Break	Lady Antebellum	Capitol Nashville	June 9
6	I Don't Believe We've Met	Danielle Bradbery	BMLG	December 1
6	If Not for You	Joey Feek	Farmhouse Recordings/Capitol Christian	April 7
10	King of Dixie	Upchurch	Redneck Nation	November 10
6	Lambs & Lions	Chase Rice	Broken Bow	November 17
7	Lee Brice	Lee Brice	Curb	November 3
1	Life Changes	Thomas Rhett	Valory Music Group	September 8
1	Live in No Shoes Nation	Kenny Chesney	Blue Chair/Columbia	October 27
3	A Long Way from Your Heart	Turnpike Troubadours	Bossier City	October 20
1	Losing Sleep	Chris Young	RCA Nashville	October 20
1	Love and War	Brad Paisley	Arista Nashville	April 21
7	Love Hope Faith	Colt Ford	Average Joe's	May 5
1	The Nashville Sound	Jason Isbell and the 400 Unit	Southeastern	June 16
1	Now	Shania Twain	Mercury Nashville	September 29
3	Now That's What I Call Country Volume 10	Various Artists	Sony Music/Universal	June 9
10	Ol' Wheeler	Wheeler Walker Jr.	Pepper Hill Records	June 2
2	On the Rocks	Midland	Big Machine	September 22
4	The Project	Lindsay Ell	Stoney Creek	August 11
1	The Rest of Our Life	Tim McGraw and Faith Hill	Arista Nashville	November 17
3	Road Less Traveled	Lauren Alaina	Mercury Nashville/Interscope/19	January 27
1	Sing It Now: Songs of Faith & Hope	Reba McEntire	Nash Icon/Capitol Christian	February 3
3	Slowheart	Kip Moore	MCA Nashville	September 8
5	Something's Going On	Trace Adkins	Wheelhouse	March 31
1	Southern Girl City Lights	Jessie James Decker	Epic Records	October 13
4	Sweet Southern Sugar	Kid Rock	Top Dog/BMG	November 3
1	Texoma Shore	Blake Shelton	Warner Bros. Nashville	November 3
1	This One's for You	Luke Combs	Columbia Nashville	June 2
3	Timeless	Home Free	Columbia	September 22
3	Unapologetically	Kelsea Ballerini	Black River	November 3
2	Vaquero	Aaron Watson	BIG Label	February 24
4	The Voice: The Complete Season 12 Collection	Lauren Duski	Republic	May 19
1	Welcome Home	Zac Brown Band	Elektra	May 12
1	What Makes You Country	Luke Bryan	Capitol Nashville	December 8
2	When the Good Guys Win	Granger Smith	Wheelhouse	October 27
2	When Was the Last Time	Darius Rucker	Capitol Nashville	October 20
1	WildHorse	RaeLynn	Warner Bros. Nashville	March 24
1	Windy City	Alison Krauss	Capitol	February 17
4	Words	Sara Evans	Concord Music/Born to Fly	July 21
5	Yours	Russell Dickerson	Triple Tigers	October 13

=== Other top albums ===
US	Album	Artist	Record label	Release date
24	15 Years: The Wild Ride	Casey Donahew	Almost Country	October 6
14	50 Years of Blonde on Blonde	Old Crow Medicine Show	Columbia Nashville	April 28
22	27861	Parmalee	Stoney Creek	July 21
12	All American Made	Margo Price	Third Man	October 20
45	American Grandstand	Rhonda Vincent & Daryle Singletary	Upper Management	July 7
42	The Blame (EP)	Sam Grow	Ole	May 19
13	Backroads (EP)	Taylor Ray Holbrook	TaylorRayMade	April 21
19	Baptized in Bourbon	Moonshine Bandits	Backroad-Average Joe's	March 3
37	Bidin' My Time	Chris Hillman	Rounder	September 22
43	Black & White Night 30	Roy Orbison	Legacy	February 24
31	Brand New Day	The Mavericks	Mono Mundo	March 31
28	Close Ties	Rodney Crowell	New West	March 31
50	Colter Wall	Colter Wall	Young Mary's Record Co.	May 12
43	DCX MMXVI Live	Dixie Chicks	Columbia	September 1
17	Fingerprints	Eli Young Band	Valory Music Co.	June 16
16	Good Ole Days	Tracy Lawrence	Lawrence Music Group	November 10
46	Greatest Hits	Jake Owen	RCA Nashville	November 24
41	Highway Queen	Nikki Lane	New West	February 17
20	I Believe in You	Dolly Parton	Dolly Records	October 13
26	Laws of Gravity	Infamous Stringdusters	Compass	January 13
14	Legacy	The Cadillac Three	Big Machine	August 25
37	The Lonely, the Lonesome & the Gone	Lee Ann Womack	Sugar Hill	October 27
26	A Love So Beautiful	Roy Orbison with the Royal Philharmonic Orchestra	Legacy	November 3
35	Lukas Nelson & Promise of the Real	Lukas Nelson & Promise of the Real	Fantasy Records	August 25
12	The Music of Nashville: Season 5, Volume 1	Nashville Cast	Big Machine	March 10
15	Never Gets Old	Joe Nichols	Red Bow Records	July 28
39	Not Dark Yet	Shelby Lynne and Allison Moorer	Thirty Tigers/Silver Cross	August 18
37	Paving My Way	Hosier	Redneckin Records	April 14
11	Purgatory	Tyler Childers	Hickman Holler	August 4
31	Puxico	Natalie Hemby	GetWrucke	January 13
38	Sagebrush	Ned LeDoux	Powder River	November 3
15	So You Wannabe An Outlaw	Steve Earle	Warner Bros. Nashville	June 16
29	Son of the South	Upchurch	RHEC Entertainment	May 5
33	Summer Love (EP)	Ryan Upchurch	Redneck Nation	May 5
43	Tell the Devil... ...I'm Gettin' There as Fast as I Can	Ray Wylie Hubbard	Bordello	August 18
17	The Texas Tenors	The Texas Tenors	The Texas Tenors	September 8
18	A Tribute to Dan Fogelberg	Various Artists	Full Moon	November 17
22	Until My Voice Goes Out	Josh Abbott Band	Pretty Damn Tough	August 18
22	The Voice: The Complete Season 13 Collection	Red Marlow	Republic	December 15
44	Way Out West	Marty Stuart & His Fabulous Superlatives	Superlatone	March 10
19	Willie and the Boys: Willie's Stash Vol. 2	Willie Nelson	Legacy	October 20
28	Worth the Wait (EP)	Lindsay Ell	Stoney Creek	March 24

== Deaths ==
- January 5 – Sam Lovullo, 88, co-creator and producer of Hee Haw.
- January 25 – Butch Trucks, 69, founder and drummer of The Allman Brothers Band
- March 11 – Don Warden, 87, best known for his years on The Porter Wagoner Show and as the manager of Wagoner and Dolly Parton.
- April 20 – Tammy Sullivan, 53, bluegrass singer known as half of the Grammy nominated father-daughter duo Tammy and Jerry Sullivan.
- May 21 – Wendell Goodman, 81, manager and husband of Wanda Jackson who penned her 1961 hit "Right or Wrong".
- May 27 – Gregg Allman, 69, singer-songwriter and musician, founder of The Allman Brothers Band.
- June 8 – Norro Wilson, 79, singer-songwriter and producer (heart failure).
- July 13 – Kayton Roberts, 83, steel guitar player who has performed with Dolly Parton, Hank Snow, Marty Stuart and Alison Krauss among others (stroke).
- July 21 – Geoff Mack, 94, Australian singer-songwriter best known for writing "I've Been Everywhere", famously covered by Hank Snow and Johnny Cash among others
- July 25 – Billy Joe Walker Jr., 64, American musician, record producer, and songwriter.
- July 25 – Michael Johnson, 72, country and pop singer from the 1970s and 1980s.
- July 27 – D. L. Menard, 85, Louisiana musician commonly known as the "Cajun Hank Williams".
- August 8 – Glen Campbell, 81, country and pop singer and musician from the 1960s onwards, best known for songs such as "Gentle on My Mind", "Rhinestone Cowboy" and "Southern Nights" (Alzheimer's Disease).
- August 16 – Jo Walker-Meador, 93, first ever full-time employee of the Country Music Association who later became its longest-serving director and was instrumental in making the genre what it is today, overseeing the creation of the CMA Awards, CMA Festival and Hall of Fame (stroke).
- September 8 – Don Williams, 78, country singer known as the "Gentle Giant": known for songs such as "Tulsa Time", "It Must Be Love" and "Good Ole Boys Like Me".
- September 8 – Troy Gentry, 50, half of Montgomery Gentry (helicopter crash)
- October 1 – Kenny Beard, 58, songwriter best known for co-writing "Where the Stars and Stripes and the Eagle Fly" by Aaron Tippin (natural causes)
- November 19 – Mel Tillis, 85, legendary Opry star and Hall of Fame member known for hits such as "Coca-Cola Cowboy", "Good Woman Blues" and "I Ain't Never" (respiratory failure).
- December 16 – Richard Dobson, 75, singer-songwriter
- December 27 – Curly Seckler, 98, American bluegrass musician (Foggy Mountain Boys, Nashville Grass).

== Hall of Fame inductees ==
=== Bluegrass Hall of Fame inductees ===
- Hazel Dickens and Alice Gerrard
- Bobby Hicks
- Roland White

=== Country Music Hall of Fame inductees ===
- Alan Jackson, singer-songwriter and leading figure in the neotraditionalist movement of the 1990s, songwriter (born 1958).
- Jerry Reed, singer-songwriter-guitarist best known for swamp rock style of music (1937–2008).
- Don Schlitz, songwriter (born 1952)

=== Canadian Country Music Hall of Fame inductees ===
- Paul Brandt (born 1972)
- Harvey Gold

== Major awards ==
=== Academy of Country Music ===
(presented in Las Vegas on April 15, 2018)

- Entertainer of the Year – Jason Aldean
- Male Vocalist of the Year – Chris Stapleton
- Female Vocalist of the Year – Miranda Lambert
- Vocal Duo of the Year – Brothers Osborne
- Vocal Group of the Year – Old Dominion
- New Male Vocalist of the Year – Brett Young
- New Female Vocalist of the Year – Lauren Alaina
- New Vocal Duo/Group of the Year – Midland
- Songwriter of the Year – Rhett Akins
- Album of the Year – From A Room: Volume 1 (Chris Stapleton)
- Single of the Year – "Body Like a Back Road" (Sam Hunt)
- Song of the Year – "Tin Man" (Jack Ingram, Miranda Lambert, Jon Randall)
- Vocal Event of the Year – "The Fighter" (Keith Urban featuring Carrie Underwood)

ACM Honors
(presented August 23 in Nashville)

- Cliffie Stone Icon Award – George Strait
- Merle Haggard Spirit Award – Eric Church
- Mae Boren Axton Award – Reba McEntire and Bob Kingsley
- Poet's Award – Willie Nelson, Toby Keith and Shel Silverstein
- Gary Haber Lifting Lives Award – Dolly Parton
- Gene Weed Milestone Award – Kelsea Ballerini
- Songwriter of the Year – Lori McKenna
- Tex Ritter Film Award – Nashville

=== Americana Music Honors & Awards ===
- Album of the Year – A Sailor's Guide to Earth (Sturgill Simpson)
- Artist of the Year – John Prine
- Duo/Group of the Year – Marty Stuart and his Fabulous Superlatives
- Song of the Year – "It Ain't Over Yet" (Rodney Crowell)
- Emerging Artist of the Year – Amanda Shires
- Instrumentalist of the Year – Charlie Sexton
- Spirit of Americana/Free Speech Award – Graham Nash
- Lifetime Achievement: Trailblazer – Iris DeMent
- Lifetime Achievement: Songwriting – Van Morrison
- Lifetime Achievement: Performance – Robert Cray
- Lifetime Achievement: Instrumentalist – Hi Rhythm Section
- Lifetime Achievement: Executive – Larry Sloven and Bruce Bromberg
- Wagonmaster Award – Jim Lauderdale

=== American Music Awards ===
(presented in Los Angeles on November 19, 2017)

- Favorite Male Artist – Keith Urban
- Favorite Female Artist – Carrie Underwood
- Favorite Group or Duo – Little Big Town
- Favorite Album – Ripcord by Keith Urban
- Favorite Song – "Blue Ain't Your Color" by Keith Urban

=== ARIA Awards ===
(presented in Sydney on November 17, 2017)

- Best Country Album – Dragonfly (Kasey Chambers)
- ARIA Hall of Fame – Daryl Braithwaite

=== Canadian Country Music Association ===
- Apple Music Fans' Choice Awards – Dean Brody
- Album of the Year – Side Effects by Dallas Smith
- Female Artist of the Year – Meghan Patrick
- Male Artist of the Year – Brett Kissel
- Group or Duo of the Year – The Road Hammers
- Single of the Year – "Autograph" by Dallas Smith
- Video of the Year – "I Didn't Fall in Love with Your Hair" by Brett Kissel
- Songwriter of the Year – "Time" by Dean Brody
- Roots Artist of the Year – The Washboard Union
- Interactive Artist of the Year – Brett Kissel
- SirusXM Rising Star – Meghan Patrick
- CCMA Discovery Award – Kalsey Kulyk
- Top Selling Album – Ripcord by Keith Urban

=== Country Music Association Awards ===
(presented on November 8, 2017, in Nashville)

- Entertainer of the Year – Garth Brooks
- Male Vocalist of the Year – Chris Stapleton
- Female Vocalist of the Year – Miranda Lambert
- New Artist of the Year – Jon Pardi
- Vocal Duo of the Year – Brothers Osborne
- Vocal Group of the Year – Little Big Town
- Musician of the Year – Mac McAnally
- Single of the Year – "Blue Ain't Your Color" (Keith Urban)
- Song of the Year – "Better Man" (Taylor Swift)
- Album of the Year – From A Room: Volume 1 (Chris Stapleton)
- Musical Event of the Year – (Glen Campbell and Willie Nelson)
- Music Video of the Year – "It Ain't My Fault" (Brothers Osborne)

=== CMT Music Awards ===
(presented in Nashville on June 7, 2017)

- Video of the Year – "Blue Ain't Your Color" (Keith Urban)
- Male Video of the Year – "Blue Ain't Your Color" (Keith Urban)
- Female Video of the Year – "Church Bells" (Carrie Underwood)
- Group/Duo Video of the Year – "H.O.L.Y." (Florida Georgia Line)
- Breakthrough Video of the Year – "Road Less Traveled" (Lauren Alaina)
- CMT Performance of the Year – "Want to Want Me" (Jason Derulo and Luke Bryan)

CMT Artists of the Year
(presented on October 18, 2019, in Nashville)

- Jason Aldean
- Luke Bryan
- Florida Georgia Line
- Chris Stapleton
- Keith Urban

=== Grammy Awards ===
(presented in New York on January 28, 2018)

- Best Country Solo Performance – Either Way (Chris Stapleton)
- Best Country Duo/Group Performance – Better Man (Little Big Town)
- Best Country Song – Broken Halos (Mike Henderson, Chris Stapleton)
- Best Country Album – From A Room: Volume 1 (Chris Stapleton)
- Best Bluegrass Album – All The Rage Vol. 1 (Rhonda Vincent) and Defying Gravity (The Infamous Stringdusters)
- Best Americana Album – The Nashville Sound (Jason Isbell)
- Best American Roots Performance – Killer Diller Blues (Alabama Shakes)
- Best American Roots Song – If We Were Vampires (Jason Isbell)
- Best Roots Gospel Album – Sing It Now: Songs of Faith & Hope (Reba McEntire)

=== International Bluegrass Music Association Awards ===
(presented on September 27, 2017)

- Entertainer of the Year – The Earls of Leicester
- Male Vocalist of the Year – Shawn Camp
- Female Vocalist of the Year – Brooke Aldridge
- Vocal Group of the Year – Flatt Lonesome
- Instrumental Group of the Year – Michael Cleveland and Flamekeeper
- Emerging Artist of the Year – Volume Five
- Guitar Player of the Year – Molly Tuttle
- Banjo Player of the Year – Noam Pikelny
- Mandolin Player of the Year – Sierra Hull
- Fiddle Player of the Year – Patrick McAvinue
- Bass Player of the Year – Alan Bartram
- Dobro Player of the Year – Josh Swift
- Album of the Year – Mountain Voodoo (Balsam Range)
- Song of the Year – "I Am A Drifer" (Volume Five)
- Recorded Event of the Year – "I've Gotta Get a Message to You" (Bobby Osborne and friends)
- Instrumental Recorded Performance of the Year – "Fiddler's Dream" (Michael Cleveland)
- Gospel Recorded Performance of the Year – "I Found A Church Today" (The Gibson Brothers)

=== Juno Awards ===
(presented in Vancouver on March 24–25, 2018)

- Country Album of the Year – Game On (James Barker Band)

== Other links ==
- Country Music Association
- Inductees of the Country Music Hall of Fame
