= Wastin' Whiskey =

2022 song by James Barker Band

Single by James Barker Band
- Released: March 25, 2022
- Genre: Country
- Length: 3:10
- Label: Starseed
- Songwriter(s): James Barker; Jared Keim; Travis Wood
- Producer(s): Todd Clark

James Barker Band singles chronology
"New Old Trucks" (2021)	"Wastin' Whiskey" (2022)	"Meet Your Mama" (2023)

Lyric Video
- "Wastin' Whiskey" on YouTube

"Wastin' Whiskey" is a song recorded by Canadian country group James Barker Band. The group's frontman James Barker wrote the song with Jared Keim and Travis Wood, while Todd Clark produced the track.

== Background ==
The band previewed "Wastin' Whiskey" on multiple social media platforms including Twitter and TikTok prior to its release. They also promoted the release of the track with a video titled "Wastin' Whiskey Roulette" where each of the band members took sips of unknown liquids out of shot glasses. The song is part of a large crop of new music the band intended to release as a potential album including "Over All Over Again" and "New Old Trucks". James Barker cited the song as the group's first "fan-driven" single, as the initial clip of the song that the band posted to TikTok quickly received over one million views in under a month, prompting the band to choose it as their next release to radio. He said that the song "came together in just a few hours – everything from the lyrics to production" and that most of the original vocals are the ones on the final version of the track.

== Critical reception ==
Nanci Dagg of Canadian Beats Media stated that the song "takes listeners back to the all-too-relatable agony of not being able to get over a broken heart, regardless of how many drinks you down," noting "heartbreak-fuelled electric guitar licks and Barker's smooth vocals". Lauren Lee of Front Porch Music favourably reviewed the track, saying that the band "perfectly [captures] that oh-so-relatable feeling of desperation that comes with the end of a relationship – the inability to move on, no matter how deeply you try to drown your sorrows".

== Accolades ==
Year	Association	Category	Result	Ref
2023	Canadian Country Music Association	Single of the Year	Nominated	

== Commercial performance ==
"Wastin' Whiskey" reached a peak of number two on the Billboard Canada Country chart for the week of August 27, 2022, marking the band's tenth top ten hit. It also reached a peak of number 67 on the Canadian Hot 100 for the same week. It has been certified Gold by Music Canada.

== Charts ==
Chart performance for "Wastin' Whiskey"
Chart (2022)	Peak position
Canada (Canadian Hot 100)	67
Canada Country (Billboard)	2

== Certifications ==
Region	Certification	Certified units/sales
Canada (Music Canada)	Gold	40,000^{‡}
^{‡} Sales+streaming figures based on certification alone.
