= Good Together (song) =

2018 song by James Barker Band

Single by James Barker Band

from the EP Singles Only
- Released: January 19, 2018
- Genre: Country
- Length: 3:20
- Label: Universal Canada
- Songwriter(s): James Barker; Gavin Slate; Travis Wood
- Producer(s): Todd Clark

James Barker Band singles chronology
"It's Working" (2017)	"Good Together" (2018)	"Keep It Simple" (2019)

"Good Together" is a song recorded by Canadian country group James Barker Band. The song was co-written by the band's frontman James Barker, along with Gavin Slate and Travis Wood. It was the lead single from the band's second extended play Singles Only, and was nominated for "Single of the Year" at the 2019 CCMA Awards.

== Background ==
Barker stated that the band made a "unanimous decision" to release the song after they listened to the demo he recorded when writing the song with frequent collaborators Gavin Slate and Travis Wood.

== Critical reception ==
Nanci Dagg of Canadian Beats Media referred to the song as a "great dance in your car, foot tapping, let’s just sing-along type of song".

== Commercial performance ==
"Good Together" debuted as the most-added song at Canadian country radio, and the second-most added song at Canadian radio overall. The song reached a peak of number six on Billboard Canada Country chart, becoming the band's fifth straight top ten hit to start their career. It was the most-spun Canadian song on Canadian country radio in 2018, a second consecutive year the band claimed that title following "Chills". The song has been certified Platinum by Music Canada.

== Charts ==
Chart (2018)	Peak position
Canada Country (Billboard)	6

== Certifications ==
Region	Certification	Certified units/sales
Canada (Music Canada)	Platinum	80,000^{‡}
^{‡} Sales+streaming figures based on certification alone.
