= There's a Drink for That =

2019 song by James Barker Band

Single by James Barker Band

from the EP Singles Only
- Released: May 24, 2019
- Genre: Country
- Length: 3:07
- Label: Universal Canada
- Songwriter(s): James Barker; Gavin Slate; Travis Wood
- Producer(s): Todd Clark; Gavin Slate

James Barker Band singles chronology
"Keep It Simple" (2019)	"There's a Drink for That" (2019)	"Slow Down Town" (2020)

Music video
- "There's a Drink for That" on YouTube

"There's a Drink for That" is a song recorded by Canadian country group James Barker Band. The song was written by the band's frontman James Barker, along with Travis Wood and Gavin Slate. It was the third single from the band's second extended play Singles Only.

== Background ==
Barker said "There's a Drink for That" felt like a "return to that summery sound" that they tried to capture on their debut single "Lawn Chair Lazy".

== Critical reception ==
Annie Reuter of Billboard called the song an "upbeat tune," referring to it as the "ideal song for the live setting," noting "hand snapped rhythms, sunny guitar parts and a sing-along chorus". Nevin Sereda of Today's Country 95.5 described the song as a "new summer time drinking song".

== Commercial performance ==
"There's a Drink for That" reached a peak of #2 on Billboard Canada Country chart, becoming the band's seventh straight top ten hit to start their career. It has been certified Gold by Music Canada.

== Music video ==
The official music video was for "There's a Drink for That" premiered on May 24, 2019, and was directed by Ben Knechtel. James Barker said the band "wanted to find an entertaining way to make it seem okay for people to drink, which is really what the song is about". He said that they "had a lot of fun shooting the video," saying that spending "the whole day driving an ice-cream truck," was a "win in itself".

== Charts ==
Chart (2019)	Peak position
Canada Country (Billboard)	2

== Certifications ==
Region	Certification	Certified units/sales
Canada (Music Canada)	Gold	40,000^{‡}
^{‡} Sales+streaming figures based on certification alone.
