= Keep It Simple (James Barker Band song) =

2019 song by James Barker Band

Single by James Barker Band

from the EP Singles Only
- Released: January 30, 2019
- Genre: Country
- Length: 3:07
- Label: Universal Canada
- Songwriter(s): James Barker; Gavin Slate; Todd Clark; Travis Wood
- Producer(s): Todd Clark

James Barker Band singles chronology
"Good Together" (2018)	"Keep It Simple" (2019)	"There's a Drink for That" (2019)

Music video
- "Keep It Simple" on YouTube

"Keep It Simple" is a song recorded by Canadian country music group James Barker Band. It was the lead single off their second extended play Singles Only. The track was co-written by the band's frontman James Barker, with Gavin Slate, Travis Wood, and the track's producer Todd Clark. It was the band's second #1 hit on the Billboard Canada Country chart, and won Single of the Year at the 2020 CCMA Awards.

== Background ==
James Barker told Sounds Like Nashville that "The concept of it in summation, is all about having a night we don’t have to get wild. You just stay home and hang with your significant other,… have a night in and just, you know, do what couples do". He told Canadian Beats Media that with this song "we wanted to push the boundaries a bit, which is something we take pride in, so people can definitely expect it to be a little different from anything we’ve released before. A big thing that we take in to account with our music is how it’s going to translate live, and how it will affect our live show. Keep It Simple is really fun and upbeat, which, to me, means it’s going to be a blast when we play it live!".

== Critical reception ==
Taryn McElheran of Canadian Beats Media said the track is a "grand tune that keeps in line with JBB’s musical works". Kerry Doole of FYI Music News said the "upbeat mood of the well-executed song mirrors lyrics extolling the virtues of Friday night fun - "Let's keep it simple, here at the house, dance in the kitchen, straight to kissing on the couch." Quite simply, it sounds like another hit".

== Accolades ==
Year	Association	Category	Result	Ref
2020	CCMA	Single Of The Year	Won	
2020	Country Music Association of Ontario	Single of the Year	Won	
2020	Country Music Association of Ontario	Music Video of the Year	Won	

== Commercial performance ==
"Keep It Simple" was certified Platinum by Music Canada on August 27, 2020 with over 80,000 sales, their second Platinum certification overall. As of May 2021, the song had received over 19.7 million streams through Spotify.

== Music video ==
The official music video for "Keep It Simple" was directed by Ben Knechtel and premiered February 19, 2019. The video features the band and is designed to appear as if it was the 1950s.

== Chart performance ==
"Keep It Simple" reached a peak of number 1 on the Billboard Canada Country chart dated June 1, 2019, their second chart topper after "Chills". It also peaked at number 87 on the Billboard Canadian Hot 100 and is their highest charting entry there.

Chart (2019)	Peak position
Canada (Canadian Hot 100)	87
Canada Country (Billboard)	1

== Certifications ==
Region	Certification	Certified units/sales
Canada (Music Canada)	Platinum	80,000^{‡}
^{‡} Sales+streaming figures based on certification alone.
