= On the Water (song) =

2023 song by James Barker Band

Single by James Barker Band featuring Dalton Dover

from the EP Ahead of Our Time
- Released: May 26, 2023
- Genre: Country
- Length: 2:58
- Label: Records Nashville; Columbia
- Songwriter(s): James Barker; Taylor Abram; Bobby Martin; Connor Stephen; Hunter Phelps; Ben Johnson; Jordan Minton
- Producer(s): Todd Clark

James Barker Band singles chronology
"Meet Your Mama" (2023)	"On the Water" (2023)	"Ahead of Our Time" (2023)

Dalton Dover singles chronology
"Giving Up on That" (2023)	"On the Water" (2023)

Lyric video
- "On the Water" on YouTube

"On the Water" is a song recorded by Canadian country music group James Barker Band featuring American country music artist Dalton Dover. The song was written by the four members of the band, along with Ben Johnson, Jordan Minton, and Hunter Phelps, while it was produced by Todd Clark. It is the second single from the band's extended play Ahead of Our Time.

== Background ==
James Barker stated that the song "touches on all the best parts of summer: fishing, swimming, chilling in a floaty and above all, doing anything but working". He added that the band "released so many songs about beer that we figured maybe it was time to release a song about the second most important liquid of the summer – water".

== Critical reception ==
Erica Zisman of Country Swag stated that the song "screams summertime" and is "perfect to add to any beach or boating playlist," while adding that the song is a "great example of all the talent" between James Barker Band and Dalton Dover. Melinda Lorge of Music Mayhem favourably reviewed the song, framing it as an "uptempo duet" where the two artists "tap into the well-deserved need to unwind with a brewsky, sunshine, and waves on a lakeside paradise after clocking out of the repetitive 9-5 workday shift". Gabby Shukin of CJVR Today's Best Country described the track as a "summer anthem". Stevie Connor of The Sound Cafe called the song a "boat-ready hit", noting Dalton Dover's "soulful vocals" and James Barker Band's "toe-tapping melodies".

== Charts ==
Chart performance for "On the Water"
Chart (2023)	Peak position
Canada Country (Billboard)	6
