= Free Soul =

Studio album by Madeline Merlo
- Released: April 29, 2016
- Recorded: 2014–16 in Nashville, TN
- Genre: Country
- Length: 38:59
- Label: Open Road
- Producer: Dan Swinimer; Matt Rovey; EO; Jeff Coplan; Todd Clark

Madeline Merlo chronology
Madeline Merlo (2014)	Free Soul (2016)	Slide (2022)

Singles from Free Soul
- 1. "Sinking Like a Stone" Released: February 18, 2014; 2. "Alive" Released: July 22, 2014; 3. "Honey Jack" Released: July 17, 2015; 4. "Whatcha Wanna Do About It" Released: January 22, 2016; 5. "War Paint" Released: June 24, 2016; 6. "Over and Over" Released: January 20, 2017

Free Soul is the debut studio album by Canadian country music artist Madeline Merlo. It was released on April 29, 2016 via Open Road Recordings. The album includes the singles "Sinking Like a Stone", "Alive", "Honey Jack", "Whatcha Wanna Do About It", "War Paint", and "Over and Over". Upon release, the album debuted at number 88 on the Billboard Canadian Albums Chart. The album's fourth single, "Whatcha Wanna Do About It" earned Merlo her first top ten single on the Canadian country singles chart.

== Background ==
In early 2014, Merlo signed a record deal with Open Road Recordings and spent approximately eight months developing her sound. She released her debut single, "Sinking Like a Stone", on February 18, 2014. The song stayed on the Canada Country chart for 20 weeks and reached a peak position of 32, which helped to establish Merlo's presence on Canadian country radio. That summer (July 22, 2014), she released an eponymous debut extended play, along with a new single, "Alive".

Merlo experienced a commercial breakthrough in 2015 with the release of her third single, "Honey Jack." The track reached the top 25 on the Canada Country chart and the song's success contributed to her being chosen as the opening act on Dean Brody and Paul Brandt's The Road Tour that year. At the 2015 Canadian Country Music Association (CCMA) Awards, Merlo won the prestigious Rising Star award. The fourth single, "Whatcha Wanna Do About It" became Merlo's first top-10 at country radio. Free Soul was made available for pre-order on April 19, 2016.

=== Content ===
Merlo previously recorded a version of "Ready to Say Goodnight" with duet partner Tim Hicks on the latter's 2014 album, 5:01.

== Critical reception ==
Nanci Dagg of Canadian Beats wrote that Free Soul is "extremely well written and well produced – from the first song to the last," and found the full-length album format "refreshing."

Tom Harrison of The Vancouver Sun was ambivalent toward the record's duelling country and pop influences but criticized Merlo's lack of personality. "Through it all," he writes, "Merlo sings well (and even writes a few songs) without having a personal style."

== Track listing ==
No.	Title	Writer(s)	Producer	Length
1.	"Whatcha Wanna Do About It"	Connie Harrington; Matthew McGinn; Steve Moakler	Matt Rovey	3:31
2.	"War Paint"	April Geesbreght; Madeline Merlo; Eric Olson	EO	3:24
3.	"Over and Over"	Jason Blaine; Jeff Pardo	Rovey	3:19
4.	"Holding On to Freedom"	Merlo; Dan Swinimer	Swinimer	3:30
5.	"Tumbling"	Heather Longstaffe; Swinimer	Swinimer	3:38
6.	"Honey Jack"	Merlo; Stephony Smith; Jesse Walker	Rovey	3:08
7.	"Ready to Say Goodnight" (featuring Tim Hicks)	Todd Clark; Tim Hicks; Jessica Mitchell	Jeff Coplan	3:55
8.	"Crush"	Clark; Emma-Lee; Gavin Slate; Donovan Woods	Clark	3:28
9.	"Sinking Like a Stone"	Jeff Johnson; Swinimer	Swinimer	3:57
10.	"Alive"	Merlo; Swinimer	Swinimer	3:36
11.	"Twist of Fate"	Arron Thomas Ritchie; Swinimer	Swinimer	3:33
Total length:				38:59

== Chart performance ==
=== Album ===
Chart (2016)	Peak position
Canadian Albums (Billboard)	88

=== Singles ===
Year	Single	Peak positions
Year	Single	CAN Country
2014	"Sinking Like a Stone"	32
2014	"Alive"	42
2015	"Honey Jack"	25
2016	"Whatcha Wanna Do About It"	10
2016	"War Paint"	13
2017	"Over and Over"	13
