= New Old Trucks =

2021 song by James Barker Band and Dierks Bentley

Single by James Barker Band with Dierks Bentley
- Released: October 8, 2021
- Genre: Country
- Length: 3:11
- Label: Sony Nashville; Villa 40; Universal Canada
- Songwriter(s): James Barker; Casey Brown; Jordan Minton; Hunter Phelps
- Producer(s): Todd Clark

James Barker Band singles chronology
"Over All Over Again" (2021)	"New Old Trucks" (2021)	"Wastin' Whiskey" (2022)

Dierks Bentley singles chronology
"Beers on Me" (2021)	"New Old Trucks" (2021)	"Worth a Shot" (2022)

"New Old Trucks" is a song recorded by Canadian country group James Barker Band and American country singer Dierks Bentley. The song was co-written by the band's lead singer and guitarist James Barker along with Casey Brown, Jordan Minton, and Hunter Phelps.

== Background ==
The song's writers, James Barker, Casey Brown, Jordan Minton, and Hunter Phelps joined for a writing session at Brown's house in Nashville, Tennessee. Both Minton and Phelps had the song title "New Old Trucks" in their notes, with Barker saying "It instantly clicked when we heard that phrase". Barker said the goal when writing the song was "making listeners think of their own first truck, or the one they still drive". A representative of the band sent a demo of the song to Bentley, who immediately wanted to join the song, telling Barker the song reminded him of his Chevrolet truck that he inherited from his father. Barker stated that every lyric in the song was something one of the writers had actually experienced, and the first line was about his first truck.

== Critical reception ==
Logan Miller of Front Porch Music called "New Old Trucks" a "legendary collaboration", and adding that it "fits so well on the radio" and was "sure to see some great airplay on both sides of the border". The Country Note referred to the track as an "anthem for truck enthusiasts". The Reviews Are In described the song as "an ode to old trucks that keep on rolling when everything else changes or breaks or moves on," also calling it "romantic and nostalgic".

== Commercial performance ==
"New Old Trucks" reached a peak of number one on Billboard Canada Country chart for the week of March 5, 2022, becoming the band's fourth number one hit, and second consecutive number one after "Over All Over Again", while also becoming Bentley's ninth chart topper in Canada. It also peaked at number 63 on the Canadian Hot 100 for the same week, marking a new career high peak charting entry there for the band. The song has been certified Gold by Music Canada.

== Credits and personnel ==
Credits adapted from AllMusic.

- Taylor Abram – backing vocals
- James Barker – vocals, songwriting
- Dierks Bentley – vocals
- Casey Brown – songwriting
- Todd Clark – production, programming, recording, backing vocals
- Dave Cohen – piano
- Josh Ditty – recording
- Jay Dufour – mixing
- Jordan Minton – songwriting
- Hunter Phelps – songwriting
- Lex Price – bass guitar
- Jerry Roe – drums
- Derek Wells – guitar
- Charlie Worsham – banjo, mandolin

== Charts ==
Chart performance for "New Old Trucks"
Chart (2021–2022)	Peak position
Canada (Canadian Hot 100)	63
Canada Country (Billboard)	1

== Certifications ==
Region	Certification	Certified units/sales
Canada (Music Canada)	Gold	40,000^{‡}
^{‡} Sales+streaming figures based on certification alone.
