= You Didn't Hear It from Me =

2025 song by James Barker Band

Single by James Barker Band

from the album One of Us
- Released: January 10, 2025
- Genre: Country
- Length: 3:00
- Label: Universal Canada
- Songwriters: James Barker; Jordan Minton; Travis Wood
- Producer: Todd Clark

James Barker Band singles chronology
"Your Mama Would Hate Me" (2024)	"You Didn't Hear It from Me" (2025)	"Somebody I Know" (2025)

Music video
- "You Didn't Hear It from Me" on YouTube

"You Didn't Hear It from Me" is a song recorded by Canadian country music group James Barker Band. The band's frontman James Barker wrote the song with Jordan Minton and Travis Wood, while Todd Clark produced it. The song reached number one on the Mediabase Canada Country chart, marking the band's sixth number one hit. It was the lead single from the band's 2025 album One of Us.

== Background and content ==
"You Didn't Hear It from Me" marked James Barker Band's first release since signing a new record deal with Universal Music Canada, which was their original label. James Barker described the song as a "way of finding a new angle on small-town breakups" He framed it as "'Don’t tell her I'm hurting, but also maybe do'" adding "it's a feeling a lot of people have experienced, especially in tight-knit communities".

== Accolades ==
Year	Association	Category	Result	Ref
2025	Canadian Country Music Association	Video Director of the Year - Alex P. Smith	Nominated	

== Music video ==
The official music video for "You Didn't It From Me" premiered on YouTube on January 10, 2025, the same day as the song's release to streaming and digital platforms. It features the James Barker Band performing the song, while members of the band occasionally whisper the phrase " you didn't hear it from me" to a woman.

== Credits and personnel ==
Credits adapted from AllMusic.

- Taylor Abram – backing vocals
- James Barker – vocals, composition
- Drew Bollman – recording
- Todd Clark – production, programming, recording, backing vocals
- Dave Cohen – keyboard
- Jay Dufour – master engineering, mixing
- Zach Kuhlman – recording
- Tony Lucido – bass guitar
- Jordan Minton – composition
- Jerry Roe – drums
- Bryan Sutton – guitar
- Travis Wood – composition

== Charts ==
=== Weekly charts ===
Weekly chart performance for "You Didn't Hear It from Me"
Chart (2025)	Peak position
Canada Country (Billboard)	3

=== Year-end charts ===
Year-end chart performance for "You Didn't Hear It from Me"
Chart (2025)	Position
Canada Country (Billboard)	20

== Certifications ==
Certifications for "You Didn't Hear It From Me"
Region	Certification	Certified units/sales
Canada (Music Canada)	Gold	40,000^{‡}
^{‡} Sales+streaming figures based on certification alone.
