= Broken Heart Thing =

2024 song by Madeline Merlo featuring Dustin Lynch

Single by Madeline Merlo featuring Dustin Lynch

from the EP One House Down (from the Girl Next Door)
- Released: August 9, 2024
- Genre: Country
- Length: 3:06
- Label: Stoney Creek
- Songwriters: Madeline Merlo; Michael Tyler; James McNair; Lalo Guzman; Zach Crowell
- Producer: Zach Crowell

Madeline Merlo singles chronology
"Tim + Faith" (2023)	"Broken Heart Thing" (2024)	"Middle of the Bed" (2025)

Dustin Lynch singles chronology
"Chevrolet" (2023)	"Broken Heart Thing" (2024)	"Easy to Love" (2025)

Music video
- "Broken Heart Thing" on YouTube

"Broken Heart Thing" is a song by Canadian country music artist Madeline Merlo featuring American country artist Dustin Lynch. Merlo wrote the song with Michael Tyler, James McNair, Lalo Guzman, and Zach Crowell, the latter of whom produced it. It is the lead single off Merlo's 2024 extended play, One House Down (from the Girl Next Door).

== Background and promotion ==
"Broken Heart Thing" was originally written by James McNair, Lalo Guzman, and Michael Tyler, and was intended to be a solo sung from the male perspective about the aftermath of breakup. Merlo heard the demo of the song and admired how it portrayed the adjustment of life after the end of a serious relationship as "something akin to a grieving process" and "grasped that idea really well". Merlo initially wrote a new bridge for the song, before she and her producer Zach Crowell decided to turn it into a duet told from both a female and male perspective.

When thinking about possible male duet partners, Merlo remarked that Dustin Lynch was the first name who came to mind. She had sung background vocals on Lynch's most recent album, and performed background vocals during an episode of CMT's "Campfire Sessions" that he had recorded as well. Merlo stated that she texted the song to Lynch, asking him to feature on it, and he agreed to do so. The song was sent to Canadian country radio one week after its release. In October 2024, Merlo made her debut performance at the Grand Ole Opry and performed the song with Lynch.

== Critical reception ==
Madeleine O'Connell of Country Now positively noted that Merlo and Lynch "[offered] a string of mesmerizing harmonies," stating that the two artists "[came] together to show the devastating effects that a recent heartbreak can have on both parties".

== Accolades ==
Year	Association	Category	Result	Ref
2025	Canadian Country Music Association	Musical Collaboration of the Year	Won	
2025	Canadian Country Music Association	Songwriter(s) of the Year	Nominated	

== Music video ==
The official music video for "Broken Heart Thing" was directed by Jack Owens and premiered on YouTube on August 9, 2024.

== Charts ==
Chart performance for "Broken Heart Thing"
Chart (2025)	Peak position
Canada Country (Billboard)	9
UK Country Airplay (Radiomonitor)	34

== Certifications ==
Certifications for "Broken Heart Thing"
Region	Certification	Certified units/sales
Canada (Music Canada)	Gold	40,000^{‡}
^{‡} Sales+streaming figures based on certification alone.
