= Ahead of Our Time (song) =

2023 song by James Barker Band

Single by James Barker Band

from the EP Ahead of Our Time
- Released: November 6, 2023
- Genre: Country
- Length: 3:07
- Label: Records Nashville
- Songwriter(s): James Barker; Jake Rose
- Producer(s): Todd Clark

James Barker Band singles chronology
"On the Water" (2023)	"Ahead of Our Time" (2023)	"Your Mama Would Hate Me" (2024)

Visualizer
- "Ahead of Our Time" on YouTube

"Ahead of Our Time" is a song recorded by Canadian country music group James Barker Band. The band's frontman James Barker wrote the song with Jake Rose, while it was produced by Todd Clark. The song is the title track and third single off the band's 2023 extended play Ahead of Our Time.

== Background ==
James Barker stated that he had the title "Ahead of Our Time" planned for a song for "a long time" but he felt he "had to find the right person to write it with who had a good vibe". He described the song as a "big idea conceptually", and that he and co-writer Jake Rose wanted the song feel "honest and true". Barker added that the "point of the song is not to be clever, it’s to sing your heart out".

== Critical reception ==
Nicole Piering of Country Swag called the song a "quintessential what-could’ve-been ballad that everyone can relate to", which "offers a poignant moment of both reflection and introspection". Chad Carlson of Today's Country Magazine favourably reviewed the track, stating that it "combines elements of traditional and modern country music", while noting that the "melody is smooth and inviting, while Barker’s vocals are as strong, confident, and clear as always". An uncredited review from All Country News stated that the song sonically "shows off how dynamic the band can be". Laura Cooney of Entertainment Focus noted that the track has a "stripped-back feel that allow the vocals and storyline to take centre stage", while opining that Barker's "emphasizes the emotion in his delivery" that reminded her of a "young Luke Bryan.

== Live performance ==
On November 17, 2023, James Barker Band performed "Ahead of Our Time" during an appearance on American television channel RFD-TV.

== Charts ==
Chart performance for "Ahead of Our Time"
Chart (2023–2024)	Peak position
Canada Country (Billboard)	9
