= Singles Only =

Singles Only may refer to:

- Singles Only (The Briefs album), a 2004 compilation album by The Briefs
- Singles Only, a 2009 album by George McConnell
- Singles Only (EP), a 2019 EP by the James Barker Band
