= One of Us (James Barker Band album) =

Studio album by James Barker Band
- Released: September 5, 2025
- Studio: Sound Stage (Nashville)
- Genre: Country
- Length: 36:17
- Label: Universal Canada
- Producer: Todd Clark

James Barker Band chronology
Ahead of Our Time (2023)	One of Us (2025)

Singles from One of Us
- 1. "You Didn't Hear It from Me" Released: January 10, 2025; 2. "Somebody I Know" Released: June 6, 2025

One of Us is the debut studio album by Canadian country music group James Barker Band. It was released on September 5, 2025, via Universal Music Canada. The album was produced by the band's frequent collaborator Todd Clark. It contains the singles "You Didn't Hear It from Me" and "Somebody I Know". The band supported the album by headlining the "Bud Light Buckle Up Tour" across Canada from September to November 2025 across Canada.

== Background ==
Prior to One of Us, James Barker Band had released four extended plays and several stand alone singles between 2017 and 2023, but not a full-length album. In a press release announcing the release of the album, the band's lead vocalist and guitarist James Barker remarked "We've never been able to release more than a few songs at a time, so dropping a full-length album just feels deeper. A single gives you one vibe, one dimension. But with this album, all the songs blend to create something bigger. There’s a thread that runs through the sound and the lyrics that really shows who we are as a band." As part of the lead-up to the album's release, the band returned to Woodville, Ontario, the hometown of both James Barker and drummer Connor Stephen, to meet with fans and film content with the community in support of the album.

== Critical reception ==
James Daykin of Entertainment Focus favourably reviewed One of Us, stating that it "feels like a full-circle journey: from the joy of small-town living to the pain of heartbreak, from youthful energy to hard-earned perspective," and opining that it is "a set of songs that feel like they belong to everyone who's ever loved, lost or lived with the radio on." An uncredited review from All Country News noted how the album blends "classic country instrumentation with modern production, creating a sound that honors their roots while embracing the possibilities of contemporary country," noting the use of both steel guitars and "subtle" 808 drum beats. The author opined that the album proves the band is "here to stay, shaping the sound of Canadian country music for years to come."

== Track listing ==
One of Us track listing
No.	Title	Writer(s)	Length
1.	"Somebody I Know"	James Barker; Todd Clark; Blake Pendergrass; Travis Wood	3:00
2.	"Bar on Fire"	Barker; Kyle Fishman; Wood	2:47
3.	"Blue Lights"	Barker; Gavin Slate; Wood	2:21
4.	"One of Us"	Barker; Jim McCormick; Slate; Wood	2:57
5.	"Real Cold Beer"	Barker; Luke Laird; Wood	3:05
6.	"I Don't See Why Not"	Barker; Clark; Pendergrass; Wood	3:19
7.	"Love on You"	Barker; Slate; Wood	3:06
8.	"Damn If I Don't"	Barker; Derek Bahr; Lauren McLamb; Colton Venner	3:18
9.	"Dancing in the Headlights"	Barker; Andrew DeRoberts; Josh Dorr	3:16
10.	"Caught Me at a Good Time"	Barker; Casey Brown; Chris Lane; Wood	2:42
11.	"You Didn't Hear It from Me"	Barker; Jordan Minton; Wood	3:09
12.	"Every One of You"	Barker; Zarni DeVette; Venner	3:10
Total length:			36:17

== Personnel ==
Credits adapted from the album's liner notes and Tidal.

=== James Barker Band ===
- James Barker
- Connor Stephen
- Taylor Abram
- Bobby Martin

=== Additional contributors ===
- Todd Clark – production (all tracks), keyboards (tracks 1, 6, 10, 11); programming, vocals, engineering (11)
- Drew Bollman – engineering
- Zach Kuhlman – engineering (1, 6, 10, 11)
- Jay Dufour – mixing (all tracks), mastering (10, 11)
- Jacob McIntyre – mixing (1, 6)
- João Carvalho – mastering (1–9)
- Justin Gray – mastering (6)
- Tony Lucido – bass (1, 6, 10, 11)
- Jerry Roe – drums (1, 6, 10, 11)
- Bryan Sutton – guitar (1, 6, 10, 11)
- Kris Donegan – guitar (1, 6, 10)
- Dave Cohen – keyboards (1, 6, 10)
- Justin Schipper – pedal steel guitar (1, 6), steel guitar (10)
- Andy Slater – creative direction
- Matt Barnes – photography
- Andrew Chee-A-Tow – design

== Charts ==
=== Singles ===
Chart performance for singles from One of Us
Year	Single	Peak positions
Year	Single	CAN Country
2025	"You Didn't Hear It from Me"	3
2025	"Somebody I Know"	2

== Release history ==
Release formats for One of Us
Country	Date	Format	Label	Ref.
Various	September 5, 2025	Digital download	Universal Canada	
Various	September 5, 2025	Streaming	Universal Canada	
Various	September 12, 2025	CD	Universal Canada	
Various	September 12, 2025	Vinyl	Universal Canada	
