= Ahead of Our Time =

2023 extended play by James Barker Band

EP by James Barker Band
- Released: October 20, 2023
- Genre: Country
- Length: 18:26
- Label: Records Nashville
- Producer: Todd Clark

James Barker Band chronology
JBB-Sides (2020)	Ahead of Our Time (2023)	One of Us (2025)

Singles from Ahead of Our Time
- 1. "Meet Your Mama" Released: January 27, 2023; 2. "On the Water" Released: May 26, 2023; 3. "Ahead of Our Time" Released: November 6, 2023

Ahead of Our Time is the fourth extended play by Canadian country music group James Barker Band. It was released on October 20, 2023, via Records Nashville, marking the band's first project released on a U.S. label. The EP was produced by Todd Clark, and contains the singles "Meet Your Mama", "On the Water", and the title track "Ahead of Our Time", as well as the promotional single "Champagne". It won Country Album of the Year at the 2024 Juno Awards.

== Background and promotion ==
The band's frontman James Barker stated that the EP "tells the story of who we are, where we’ve been and where we’re headed in our next chapter". He added that the band was "drawn to the title of Ahead Of Our Time because these songs have been a part of our journey for a while". After not releasing an extended play since 2020, Barker remarked "I feel like we've been sitting on music for so long. And I feel like this is the best music we've ever made".

The band performed live at a "pop up show" at Ole Red in Nashville, Tennessee on November 28, 2023, to celebrate the release of the project.

== Critical reception ==
Lorie Hollabaugh of Music Row stated that the EP "showcases the group’s trademark cheeky lyrics and catchy melodies". Nicole Piering of Country Swag opined that the project "shows why they’ve become megastars in Canada and serves as a perfect introduction to new fans everywhere". An uncredited review from All Country News said that the EP "is reflective of the [band's] dynamic approach and matches the dynamics within the group", noting "heartfelt narratives and voices that meld together like butter". Laura Cooney of Entertainment Focus favourably reviewed the project, stating that it "shows the diversity and range of their sound and exudes positive energy throughout, as well as highlighting their musicianship and James’s skills as a songwriter and vocalist".

== Track listing ==
No.	Title	Writer(s)	Length
1.	"Step on His Boots"	James Barker; John Byron; Blake Pendergrass; Travis Wood	3:04
2.	"Ahead of Our Time"	Barker; Jake Rose	3:07
3.	"Champagne"	Barker; Wood; Rodney Clawson	3:29
4.	"Meet Your Mama"	Barker; Wood; Todd Clark; Gavin Slate	2:58
5.	"On the Water" (featuring Dalton Dover)	Barker; Taylor Abram; Bobby Martin; Connor Stephen; Hunter Phelps; Ben Johnson; Jordan Minton	2:58
6.	"Heartbeat"	Barker; Clark; Slate; Wood	2:47
Total length:			18:26

== Credits and personnel ==
Credits adapted from AllMusic.

- Taylor Abram – background vocals, composition
- James Barker – lead vocals, guitar, composition
- Drew Bollman — engineering
- João Carvalho – master engineering
- Ben Caver – background vocals
- Todd Clark — backing vocals, composition, production, engineering, guitar, keyboard, programming
- Rodney Clawson – composition
- Dave Cohen – keyboard
- Josh Ditty – engineering
- Kris Donegan – guitar
- Dalton Dover – featured vocals
- Jay Dufour – mixing
- Matt Huber – mixing engineer
- Tony Lucido – bass guitar
- Darren McGill – assistant engineering
- Joel McKenney – assistant engineering
- Lex Price – bass guitar
- Jerry Roe – drums
- Jake Rose – composition, programming
- Justin Schipper – pedal steel guitar
- Gavin Slate – composition, programming
- Byron Sutton – acoustic guitar, banjo, mandolin
- Derek Wells – electric guitar
- Charlie Worsham – acoustic guitar, guitar, mandolin

== Awards and nominations ==
Year	Association	Category	Nominated work	Result	Ref.
2024	Juno Awards	Country Album of the Year	Ahead of Our Time	Won	
2024	CMAO Awards	Album or EP of the Year	Ahead of Our Time	Nominated	
2024	Canadian Country Music Awards	Single of the Year	"Meet Your Mama"	Pending	

== Release history ==
Release formats for Ahead of Our Time
Country	Date	Format	Label	Ref.
Various	October 20, 2023	Digital download	Records Label, LLC	
Various	October 20, 2023	Streaming	Records Label, LLC	
