= Meet Your Mama =

2023 song by James Barker Band

Single by James Barker Band

from the EP Ahead of Our Time
- Released: January 27, 2023
- Genre: Country
- Length: 2:58
- Label: Records; Columbia
- Songwriter(s): James Barker; Gavin Slate; Todd Clark; Travis Wood
- Producer(s): Todd Clark

James Barker Band singles chronology
"Wastin' Whiskey" (2022)	"Meet Your Mama" (2023)	"On the Water" (2023)

Lyric video
- "Meet Your Mama" on YouTube

"Meet Your Mama" is a song recorded by Canadian country music group James Barker Band. The band's frontman James Barker wrote the song along with Gavin Slate, Travis Wood, and producer Todd Clark. It marks the band's first release after signing with Records Nashville in 2023. The song is the lead single off the band's extended play Ahead of Our Time.

== Background ==
The band's frontman James Barker stated the song is about "that feeling of being early on in a relationship and wanting to know everything about that person." Barker and the band believed that the song can provoke an emotional response due to its authenticity about knowing when you have met the right person. Guitarist Bobby Martin stated that the song shows a "more mature side" of the band that fans had yet to see in their music. Barker credited co-writer and producer Todd Clark for the "anthemic" feel of the chorus.

== Critical reception ==
Erica Zisman of Country Swag stated that "Meet Your Mama" is a "sweet song," with "the potential to be a killer radio single," while also adding that "it is only a matter of time before the American country music fanbase catches on" to the band's music.

== Commercial performance ==
"Meet Your Mama" was the sixth most-added Canadian song at all formats of radio in Canada for the week of February 6, 2023. It debuted at number 44 on the Billboard Canada Country chart for the week of February 11, 2023. It would later peak at number three after 15 weeks on the chart, and remained there for two weeks. The song debuted at number 85 on the Canadian Hot 100 for the week of May 27, 2023. On Mediabase Canada Country, "Meet Your Mama" reached number one for the chart issued May 15, 2023. That same week, it was the most-spun domestic track on Canadian country radio since 2016, according to Mediabase.

== Live performance ==
James Barker Band performed "Meet Your Mama" live on KTLA on February 3, 2023, as part of their "Music Fest Friday" series.

== Accolades ==
Year	Association	Category	Result	Ref
2024	Canadian Country Music Association	Single of the Year	Nominated	

== Charts ==
Chart performance for "Meet Your Mama"
Chart (2023)	Peak position
Canada (Canadian Hot 100)	85
Canada Country (Billboard)	3

== Certifications ==
Certifications for "Meet Your Mama"
Region	Certification	Certified units/sales
Canada (Music Canada)	Gold	40,000^{‡}
^{‡} Sales+streaming figures based on certification alone.
