= Into the West =

Into the West may refer to:

- Into the West (film), a 1992 film
- "Into the West" (song), a 2003 song from the film The Lord of the Rings: The Return of the King
- Into the West (miniseries), a 2005 mini-series on Turner Network Television
- Into the West (album), a 2004 debut album by New Zealand operatic singer Yulia
- Into the West, the American re-release of Pilot Speed's album Sell Control for Life's Speed
- "Into the West", a song from Will Martin's debut album
