= Summer Time (song) =

2020 song by James Barker Band

Single by James Barker Band
- Released: June 12, 2020
- Genre: Country
- Length: 3:06
- Label: Universal Canada
- Songwriter(s): James Barker; Todd Clark; Gavin Slate; Travis Wood
- Producer(s): Todd Clark

James Barker Band singles chronology
"Slow Down Town" (2020)	"Summer Time" (2020)	"Over All Over Again" (2021)

"Summer Time" is a 2020 song recorded by Canadian country group James Barker Band. It was co-written by the band's frontman James Barker, with Gavin Slate, Travis Wood, and producer Todd Clark.

== Background ==
"Summer Time" was released amidst the COVID-19 pandemic, following a run of seventy-five consecutive live stream shows online from the band. Frontman James Barker reflected on the importance of summer to Canadians and wanted to spread some optimism in the pandemic summer, saying "we hope ... fans connect with that nostalgic feeling of a more relaxed state of mind".

== Critical reception ==
Katie Colley of ET Canada called the song "catchy", saying it puts you in the "summer spirit". 93.7 JR Country referred to the track as a "summer anthem" and "sunshine for your ears", noting "shimmery guitar riffs and James Barker's warm vocals". Chris Parton of Sounds Like Nashville said the song is "purpose built for fun in the sun" with "breezy guitars" and "a foot-tapping beat", noting Barker's "bright, carefree vocal".

== Commercial performance ==
"Summer Time" reached a peak of No. 15 on Billboard Canada Country chart, marking the band's eighth Top 20 hit. It also charted at No. 24 on the Hot Canadian Digital Songs chart in the week after its release. The song has been certified Gold by Music Canada.

== Live performance ==
James Barker Band performed "Summer Time" live at the 2020 Canadian Country Music Awards, with the band being split into groups of two, performing from both Oro-Medonte, Ontario and Nashville, Tennessee. The award show was broadcast live on Global in Canada, as well as on the Global App, and aired on several Corus radio stations in Alberta and Ontario.

== Credits and personnel ==
Credits adapted from AllMusic.

- James Barker – lead vocals, songwriting
- Todd Clark — backing vocals, production, engineering, guitar, keyboard, programming, songwriting
- Dave Cohen – keyboard
- Matty Green – mixing
- Tony Lucido – bass guitar
- Rob McNeeley – guitar
- Andrew Mendelson – master engineering
- Justin Ostrander – guitar
- Jerry Roe – drums
- Justin Schipper – steel guitar
- Gavin Slate – backing vocals, guitar, programming, songwriting
- Travis Wood – backing vocals, songwriting

== Charts ==
Chart (2020)	Peak position
Canada Country (Billboard)	15
Canada Digital Songs (Billboard)	24

== Certifications ==
Region	Certification	Certified units/sales
Canada (Music Canada)	Gold	40,000^{‡}
^{‡} Sales+streaming figures based on certification alone.
