= After Dark (Carry Me Home) =

2026 song by James Barker Band

Single by James Barker Band
- Released: June 26, 2026
- Genre: Country folk
- Length: 3:01
- Label: Universal Canada
- Songwriters: James Barker; Gavin Slate
- Producer: Todd Clark

James Barker Band singles chronology
"Somebody I Know" (2025)	"After Dark (Carry Me Home)" (2026)

Music video
- "After Dark (Carry Me Home)" on YouTube

"After Dark (Carry Me Home)" is a song recorded by Canadian country music group James Barker Band. The band's frontman James Barker wrote the song with Gavin Slate, while Todd Clark produced the track.

== Background ==
In a press release, Barker remarked with regards to the song's content "it's a common thing, especially when you're at a dive bar, to get a beer and a shot. You get them together and the whole thought was like, one for you, one for where you've been," adding that "The bourbon's to forget the things you've gone through and the beer's for the dude who's just hanging out tonight." He added that amidst a new process of writing songs for the band's next musical chapter, they were "trying to carve out a sound that isn't based on where we've been, but where we're going."

== Critical reception ==
Heather Taylor-Singh opined that while "After Dark" "embraces a folk-inspired sound that charts new territory for the band," it is "still grounded in the group’s quintessential country instincts and melodic tendencies". Eric Alper similarly noted that the song had a "a more organic, folk-inspired sound" than the band's previous musical output. An uncredited review from OTTtimes.ca referred to the song as "a heartfelt anthem that signals a fresh creative direction" for the band. Top Country named "After Dark" their "Pick of the Week" for July 22, 2026, stating that it has "easy-going energy that feels just as fitting for country radio as it does for midsummer bonfire nights".

== Credits and personnel ==
Credits adapted from Apple Music.

- Joao Carvalho – mastering engineer
- Todd Clark – production, recording engineer
- Jay Dufour – mixing engineer, immersive mixing engineer
- Justin Gray – mastering engineer

== Charts ==
Weekly chart performance for "After Dark (Carry Me Home)"
Chart (2026)	Peak position
Canada (Canadian Hot 100)	61
Canada Country (Billboard)	4
