= Slide (Madeline Merlo song) =

2022 song by Madeline Merlo

Single by Madeline Merlo

from the EP Slide
- Released: December 27, 2022
- Genre: Country pop
- Length: 3:34
- Label: Wheelhouse; BMG
- Songwriter(s): Madeline Merlo; Jerry Flowers; Sam Hunt; Zach Crowell
- Producer(s): Zach Crowell

Madeline Merlo singles chronology
| "It Didn't" (2020) | "Slide" (2022) | "Tim + Faith" (2023) |

Music video
- "Slide" on YouTube

"Slide" is a song co-written and recorded by Canadian country singer Madeline Merlo. She wrote the song with Jerry Flowers, Sam Hunt, and producer Zach Crowell. It is the lead single in Canada off Merlo's debut US extended play Slide.

== Background ==
Merlo's producer Zach Crowell was originally working on "Slide" with American country artist Sam Hunt and songwriter/guitarist Jerry Flowers. They had only developed a chorus melody when they felt the song sounded "better suited for a woman" and wasn't right for Hunt. Merlo remarked that she was at dinner with friends in Nashville, Tennessee when she received a call from Crowell asking if she wanted to take over the track. She left to work on it with him and Flowers immediately, and completed the song after several writing sessions. Merlo stated that after months of writing following signing her US record deal with BBR Music Group, "Slide" was the first song that "felt right" and "there was a lot of like excitement and joy around" it.

== Critical reception ==
Top Country named "Slide" their "Pick of the Week" for the week of January 27, 2023, describing it as a "conscious evolution" for Merlo's music. An uncredited review from Hot Country 103.5 stated the song "not only checks all the boxes, but is one of [Merlo's] best releases yet", adding that it "has an infectious groove". In reference to Merlo taking over the song from Sam Hunt, Erica Zisman of Country Swag stated that Merlo "was clearly the right woman for the job".

== Commercial performance ==
"Slide" debuted as the most-added domestic song at all formats of Canadian radio according to Mediabase in January 2023. It then debuted at number 48 on the Billboard Canada Country chart for the week of January 21, 2023. The song would peak at number six on that chart, after climbing for 15 weeks. It thus became the highest peaking single of Merlo's career to-date.

== Live performance ==
Merlo performed a live acoustic version of "Slide" on KTLA in the United States as part of their "Music Fest Friday" series on September 30, 2022.

== Music video ==
The official music video for "Slide" premiered on YouTube on October 26, 2022.

== Charts ==
Chart performance for "Slide"
| Chart (2023) | Peak position |
|---|---|
| Canada Country (Billboard) | 6 |
