= Wooden Bones =

Studio album by Pilot Speed
- Released: April 28, 2009
- Genre: Rock
- Length: 40:24
- Label: MapleMusic Recordings (Canada); Wind-up Records (U.S.)
- Producer: Gregg Wattenberg

Pilot Speed chronology
Sell Control for Life's Speed (2003)	Wooden Bones (2009)

Wooden Bones is the third and final studio album by Canadian rock band Pilot Speed. The song "Light You Up" was featured in a promotional trailer prior to each film at the 2009 Toronto Film Festival.

Professional ratings
Review scores
Source	Rating
Allmusic	link

== Track listing ==
No.	Title	Length
1.	"Put the Phone Down"	3:54
2.	"Light You Up"	4:13
3.	"Bluff"	3:20
4.	"Ain't No Life"	3:45
5.	"Up on the Bridge"	2:57
6.	"Where Does it Begin?"	3:43
7.	"What is Real, What is Doubt"	4:02
8.	"Today I Feel Sure"	3:33
9.	"Midnight Fires"	4:17
10.	"Wooden Bones"	4:24
11.	"Open Arms"	4:16
