= For All That's Given, Wasted =

EP by Pilot Speed
- Released: Summer 2001 (Canada Only)
- Recorded: 2001
- Genre: Rock
- Length: 28:02
- Label: Independent
- Producer: Unknown

Pilot Speed chronology
For All That's Given, Wasted (2001)	Caught by the Window (2003)

For All That's Given, Wasted is a rare debut EP by Canadian rock band Pilot Speed (at the time known as Pilate).

== Track listing ==
No.	Title	Length
1.	"Drowning Man"	3:51
2.	"Mercy"	4:16
3.	"You're All I Need"	4:44
4.	"Long Gone"	3:52
5.	"Save Me"	5:21
6.	"Alright"	5:39
