= Honey Jack =

Single by Madeline Merlo

from the album Free Soul
- Released: July 17, 2015
- Recorded: Nashville, TN in 2015
- Genre: Country
- Length: 3:08
- Label: Open Road
- Songwriter(s): Madeline Merlo; Stephony Smith; Jesse Walker
- Producer(s): Matt Rovey

Madeline Merlo singles chronology
"Alive" (2014)	"Honey Jack" (2015)	"Whatcha Wanna Do About It" (2016)

"Honey Jack" is a song recorded by Canadian country music artist Madeline Merlo for her debut studio album, Free Soul (2016). Merlo co-wrote the song with Stephony Smith and Jesse Walker. It was released July 17, 2015 as the record's third single. "Honey Jack" was the first single recorded specifically for Free Soul after the release of Merlo's eponymous EP in 2014.

== Content ==
"Honey Jack" was written and recorded in Nashville, Tennessee in the spring of 2015. The lyrics draw comparisons between an independent woman and the titular liquor, with Merlo describing the drink as "strong and sweet, just like me."

== Lyric video ==
No music video was filmed for "Honey Jack", however an official lyric video premiered on August 20, 2015.

== Chart performance ==
"Honey Jack" debuted on the Canada Country chart dated October 3, 2015 and reached a peak position of 25 on the chart dated November 21, 2015.

Chart (2015)	Peak position
Canada Country (Billboard)	25
