= Lawn Chair Lazy =

2016 song by James Barker Band

Single by James Barker Band

from the EP Game On
- Released: May 6, 2016
- Genre: Country
- Length: 3:20
- Label: Universal Canada
- Songwriter(s): James Barker; Gavin Slate
- Producer(s): Todd Clark

James Barker Band singles chronology
"Lawn Chair Lazy" (2016)	"Just Sayin'" (2016)

Music video
- "Lawn Chair Lazy" on YouTube

"Lawn Chair Lazy" is a song recorded by Canadian country group James Barker Band. The song was co-written by the band's frontman James Barker, with Gavin Slate. It was the debut single from the band, and the lead single from their extended play Game On.

== Commercial performance ==
"Lawn Chair Lazy" reached a peak of #6 on Billboard Canada Country chart. This made it the highest-charting debut single by a Canadian country artist at the time. It has been certified Platinum by Music Canada.

== Music video ==
The official music video for "Lawn Chair Lazy" premiered on Taste of Country on June 20, 2019.

== Charts ==
Chart (2016)	Peak position
Canada Country (Billboard)	3

== Certifications ==
Region	Certification	Certified units/sales
Canada (Music Canada)	Platinum	80,000^{‡}
^{‡} Sales+streaming figures based on certification alone.
