= Slide (Madeline Merlo EP) =

2022 extended play by Madeline Merlo

EP by Madeline Merlo
- Released: September 23, 2022
- Genre: Country pop
- Length: 24:56
- Label: Wheelhouse
- Producer: Zach Crowell; Jerry Flowers (track 2); Nathan Chapman (track 3)

Madeline Merlo chronology
Free Soul (2016)	Slide (2022)	One House Down (from the Girl Next Door) (2024)

Singles from Slide
- 1. "Slide" Released: December 27, 2022

Slide is the second extended play by Canadian country artist Madeline Merlo. It was released on September 23, 2022, via Wheelhouse Records, and marks Merlo's debut release in the United States. She co-wrote every song on the project. The title track was released as a single to Canadian country radio.

== Background and promotion ==
Merlo signed with the BBR Music Group in 2020 and took extra time to write songs before releasing the extended play. She felt that she initially put too much pressure on herself, before refocusing with the help of her new producer Zach Crowell. She remarked that it "started to start to sound like me and this kind of next step and evolution that I was hoping for," after some time and that the title track "Slide" was the first song that "felt right". The songs are intended to be included on a full-length album, with Merlo remarking that she wanted to "tease what the rest of the album would be like". She was very thankful that her label gave her "the trust and time to pursue" the sound she wanted.

Merlo performed a live acoustic version of the title track on KTLA as part of their "Music Fest Friday" series on September 30, 2022.

== Content ==
The title track "Slide" was initially co-written by American country artist Sam Hunt alongside Crowell and Jerry Flowers. They had intended for the song to be for Hunt, but felt early on during the writing process that it was more of a feminine song, and Crowell asked Merlo if she was interested in joining them to finish the song. In regard to "YOUNG-ish," Merlo stated that she is "passionate about writing songs with strong female characters." "Girl Where He Grew Up" was not meant to be included on the EP, but after it received plenty of attention on TikTok earlier in the year, Merlo decided to ask her label to replace the original track four with it, which they agreed to do.

== Critical reception ==
Erica Zisman of Country Swag reviewed the project favourably, saying Merlo "manages to showcase her songwriting chops and her killer vocals," adding that "each and every song is methodically placed," and that it was "the perfect introduction for new fans and audiences in American country music." James Daykin of Entertainment Focus also gave a positive review of Slide, writing that Merlo "delivers powerful female stories, from budding romances to growing up to the lessons learned in-between." Stephen Andrew of PopCulture stated that the four songs "are incredibly eclectic examples of pop-flavored country."

== Track listing ==
Slide
No.	Title	Writer(s)	Length
1.	"Slide"	Madeline Merlo, Jerry Flowers, Sam Hunt, Zach Crowell	3:34
2.	"YOUNG-ish"	Merlo, Flowers, Crowell, Josh Osborne	3:29
3.	"Girl Where He Grew Up"	Merlo, Jon Nite, Nathan Chapman	3:10
4.	"I Need a Drink"	Merlo, Crowell, Ashley Gorley, Hillary Lindsey	3:10
Total length:			13:26

== Personnel ==
Adapted from AllMusic.

- Nick Autry - engineering
- Nathan Chapman - production, composition, electric guitar, keyboard
- Jim Cooley - engineering
- Zach Crowell - composition, keyboard, production, programming, recording, background vocals
- Jerry Flowers - composition, electric guitar, production, background vocals
- Ashley Gorley - composition
- Kenny Greenberg - electric guitar
- Sam Hunt - composition
- Scott Johnson - project coordinator
- Zach Kuhlman - engineering
- Hillary Lindsey - composing, background vocals
- Sol Littlefield - electric guitar
- Devin Malone - acoustic guitar, electric guitar, mandolin
- Joel McKenney - engineering
- Andrew Mendelson - engineering
- Madeline Merlo - composition, vocals
- Jon Nite - composition
- Josh Osborne - composition
- Danny Radar - acoustic guitar
- Scott Sanders - guitar, pedal steel guitar
- Jimmy Lee Sloas - bass guitar
- Aaron Sterling - drums
- Nir Z - drums

== Charts ==
=== Singles ===
Chart performance for singles from Slide
Year	Single	Peak chart positions
Year	Single	CAN Country
2022	"Slide"	6

== Release history ==
Release formats for Slide
Country	Date	Format	Label	Ref.
Various	September 23, 2022	Digital download	Wheelhouse Records	
Various	September 23, 2022	Streaming	Wheelhouse Records	
