= Caught by the Window =

Studio album by Pilot Speed
- Released: September 23, 2003 (Canada); July 13, 2004 (U.S.); March 7, 2005 (Australia); March 16, 2005 (Japan)
- Recorded: 2002
- Genre: Rock
- Length: 54:19
- Label: MapleMusic Recordings (Canada); MRCD 746410
- Producer: Joao Carvalho

Pilot Speed chronology
For All That's Given, Wasted (2001)	Caught by the Window (2003)	Sell Control for Life's Speed (2006)

Professional ratings
Review scores
Source	Rating
Allmusic	4/5 stars

Caught by the Window is the debut album of Canadian rock band Pilot Speed (at the time known as Pilate). It was recorded at Umbrella Studios, Toronto, Ontario. The singles from the album, "Into Your Hideout" and "Melt Into the Walls", peaked at #15 and #30 on Canada's Rock chart, respectively.

== Commercial performance ==
Caught by the Window reached #95 on the Canadian Albums Chart. By 2004, the album had sold over 32,000 units.

== Track listing ==
All songs by Pilot Speed, all words by Todd Clark.

No.	Title	Length
1.	"Endgame"	2:09
2.	"Melt into the Walls"	4:16
3.	"Into Your Hideout"	3:56
4.	"Mercy"	4:28
5.	"Fall Down"	4:41
6.	"Don't Waste Your Breath"	5:47
7.	"Collide"	5:08
8.	"Perfect Thrill"	3:04
9.	"Alright"	5:39
10.	"Overrated"	3:16
11.	"The Travel Song"	3:54
12.	"Out on My Feet"	5:09
13.	"A Reprise"	2:45
