= Whatcha Wanna Do About It =

Single by Madeline Merlo

from the album Free Soul
- Released: January 22, 2016
- Genre: Country pop
- Length: 3:31
- Label: Open Road
- Songwriter(s): Connie Harrington; Matt McGinn; Steve Moakler
- Producer(s): Matt Rovey

Madeline Merlo singles chronology
"Honey Jack" (2015)	"Whatcha Wanna Do About It" (2016)	"War Paint" (2016)

Music video
- "Whatcha Wanna Do About It" on YouTube

"Whatcha Wanna Do About It" is a song recorded by Canadian country music artist Madeline Merlo for her debut studio album, Free Soul (2016). The song was written by Connie Harrington, Matt McGinn, and Steve Moakler, and was produced by Matt Rovey. It was released January 22, 2016 as the album's fourth official single. Following its release, "Whatcha Wanna Do About It" became Merlo's fastest-rising single and earned Merlo her first top ten single on the Canada Country chart.

== Content ==
"Whatcha Wanna Do About It" describes a relatable situation in which two people "dance around" their feelings for each other, with Merlo attempting to break the cycle by asking her love interest to make a move.

== Promotion ==
Merlo appeared on Breakfast Television Toronto on June 2, 2016 to promote the single.

== Chart performance ==
"Whatcha Wanna Do About It" debuted on the Canada Country chart dated February 27, 2016. In its tenth week, on the chart dated March 30, 2016, the song reached its peak position of 10. "Whatcha Wanna Do About It" also reached number 43 on the comprehensive Canada All-Format Airplay chart, her first entry on the tally.

== Music video ==
An accompanying video for "Whatcha Wanna Do About It" was directed by Adam Rothlein and filmed in Los Angeles, California. The video premiered through select radio stations on February 5, 2016 and was made available everywhere on February 10, 2016.

== Charts ==
Chart (2016)	Peak position
Canada Country (Billboard)	10
