= Game On (EP) =

EP by James Barker Band
- Released: April 21, 2017
- Genre: Country
- Length: 22:21
- Label: Universal Canada
- Producer: Todd Clark

James Barker Band chronology
Game On (2017)	Singles Only (2019)

Singles from Game On
- 1. "Lawn Chair Lazy" Released: May 6, 2016; 2. "Just Sayin'" Released: October 14, 2016; 3. "Chills" Released: March 3, 2017; 4. "It's Working" Released: August 23, 2017

Game On is the debut EP by Canadian country music ensemble James Barker Band, released on April 21, 2017. All four of the singles released from the record have reached the top 10 at Canadian country radio, including one number one hit with "Chills". Upon its release, Game On debuted at number 29 on the Canadian Albums Chart.

== Singles ==
The group's debut single, "Lawn Chair Lazy", was released May 6, 2016. By peaking at number three on the Canada Country chart, the song became the highest-charting debut single by a Canadian country artist.

"Just Sayin'" was released in October 2016 as the second single off what would become Game On. It also reached the top 10.

"Chills" was released as the third single on March 3, 2017. The song became the group's first to chart on the Canadian Hot 100, reaching a peak of 91. It reached number one on the Canadian country chart, making the James Barker Band the first Canadian act to produce a number one radio single from a debut album. "Chills" was later released to American country radio on October 23, 2017, as their debut radio single in that country.

The EP's fourth single, "It's Working", was released in August 2017. It earned the group their fourth consecutive top 10 single.

== Critical reception ==
Annie Reuter of Sounds Like Nashville wrote that the EP "showcases both their fun and sentimental sides," and that songs like "Chills" help "solidify the band's staying power."

== Track listing ==
No.	Title	Writer(s)	Length
1.	"Lawn Chair Lazy"	James Barker; Gavin Slate Travis Wood	3:16
2.	"Just Sayin'"	Barker; Todd Clark; Slate; Travis Wood	3:07
3.	"Chills"	Barker; Slate; Wood; Donovan Woods	3:08
4.	"It's Working"	Barker; Slate; Wood	3:13
5.	"Throwback"	Clark; Slate; Wood	3:12
6.	"Living the Dream"	Taylor Abram; Kris Barclay; Barker; Bobby Martin; Connor Stephen	3:28
7.	"Chills" (acoustic)	Barker; Slate; Wood; Woods	2:57
Total length:			22:21

== Charts ==
=== EP ===
Chart (2017)	Peak position
Canadian Albums (Billboard)	29

=== Singles ===
Year	Single	Peak positions			Certifications
Year	Single	CAN Country	CAN	US Country Airplay	Certifications
2016	"Lawn Chair Lazy"	3	—	—	MC: Platinum
2016	"Just Sayin'"	6	—	—	MC: Gold
2017	"Chills"	1	91	49	MC: 2× Platinum
2017	"It's Working"	8	—	—	MC: Gold

== Certifications ==
Region	Certification	Certified units/sales
Canada (Music Canada)	Gold	40,000^{‡}
^{‡} Sales+streaming figures based on certification alone.

== Awards and nominations ==
Year	Award	Category	Work	Result	Ref
2017	CMAO Awards	Single of the Year	"Lawn Chair Lazy"	Nominated	
2017	CMAO Awards	Music Video of the Year	"Chills"	Nominated	
2017	CCMA	Album of the Year	Game On	Nominated	
2017	CCMA	Single of the Year	"Lawn Chair Lazy"	Nominated	
2017	CCMA	Video of the Year	"Chills"	Nominated	
