= It Didn't =

2020 song by Madeline Merlo

Single by Madeline Merlo
- Released: October 28, 2020
- Length: 2:58
- Label: Open Road; BBR; BMG
- Songwriters: Madeline Merlo; Jason Blaine; Jeff Pardo
- Producer: Jeff Pardo

Madeline Merlo singles chronology
"Kiss Kiss" (2020)	"It Didn't" (2020)	"Slide" (2022)

Music video
- "It Didn't" on YouTube

"It Didn't" is a song recorded and co-written by Canadian country pop artist Madeline Merlo. She wrote the track with Jason Blaine and producer Jeff Pardo.

== Background and release ==
Merlo stated that "It Didn't" was one of her favourite songs that she had ever written. She described it as "about feeling the light at the end of the tunnel after a difficult time," adding it "touches on my battle with depression and overcoming a tumultuous breakup".

"It Didn't" was initially released as a promotional single in April 2020 on the same day Merlo released the songs "Kiss Kiss" and "If You Never Broke My Heart". She viewed the three tracks as a "reflection" of the two years she had spent living in Nashville, Tennessee. Together, Merlo said they are meant to represent the "multitude of emotions you experience going through heartbreak and ending up on the other side". "It Didn't" was later sent to country radio as the follow-up to "Kiss Kiss" in October 2020.

== Critical reception ==
Hendrik Pape of Sound Check Entertainment referred to the track as an "up-tempo post-break-up anthem". Front Porch Music described the song as a "power track with an electric guitar, an undeniably contagious tempo, and delicately curated lyrics," calling Merlo's voice "powerful". Ally Paige of Swift Current Online said the song "joyfully celebrates the closure after the heartbreak and finding the light at the end".

== Commercial performance ==
"It Didn't" reached a peak of #17 on the Billboard Canada Country chart dated March 20, 2021 marking Merlo's eighth Top 20 hit. It has been certified Gold by Music Canada.

== Music video ==
The official music video for "It Didn't " premiered on February 17, 2021. The video was directed by brothers John Edde and Matt Edde. It features Merlo starting the video on a couch, before transitioning into scenes of enjoyment. Merlo stated that "the boxer at the end is a metaphor for the fight it takes to come out on the other side".

== Charts ==
Chart (2021)	Peak position
Canada Country (Billboard)	17

== Certifications ==
Region	Certification	Certified units/sales
Canada (Music Canada)	Gold	40,000^{‡}
^{‡} Sales+streaming figures based on certification alone.

== Release history ==
Region	Date	Format	Label	Ref.
Various	24 April 2020	Digital download; streaming	Open Road Recordings	
Canada	28 October 2020	Country radio	Open Road Recordings	
