= It's Working (James Barker Band song) =

2017 song by James Barker Band

Single by James Barker Band

from the EP Game On
- Released: August 23, 2017
- Genre: Country
- Length: 3:13
- Label: Universal Canada
- Songwriter(s): James Barker; Gavin Slate; Travis Wood
- Producer(s): Todd Clark

James Barker Band singles chronology
"Chills" (2017)	"It's Working" (2017)	"Good Together" (2018)

Music video
- "It's Working" on YouTube

"It's Working" is a song recorded by Canadian country group James Barker Band. Barker co-wrote the song with Gavin Slate and Travis Wood. It was the fourth single from the band's debut extended play Game On.

== Critical reception ==
Sara Netemeyer of Country Fancast stated in response to the track: "there is no doubt these guys know how to write a catchy song".

== Commercial performance ==
"It's Working" reached a peak of number three on the Billboard Canada Country chart, marking four consecutive top ten hits to open the band's radio career. It has been certified Gold by Music Canada.

== Music video ==
The official music video was for "It's Working" premiered on August 23, 2017, and was directed by Pedro Rosa. The video features footage from the band's live performances and backstage content, in addition to a cameo appearance by Dean Brody on his "Beautiful Freakshow" Tour.

== Charts ==
Chart (2017)	Peak position
Canada Country (Billboard)	3

== Certifications ==
Region	Certification	Certified units/sales
Canada (Music Canada)	Gold	40,000^{‡}
^{‡} Sales+streaming figures based on certification alone.
