= Singles Only (EP) =

EP by James Barker Band
- Released: May 24, 2019
- Genre: Country
- Length: 22:03
- Label: Universal Canada
- Producer: Todd Clark; Gavin Slate

James Barker Band chronology
Game On (2017)	Singles Only (2019)	JBB-Sides (2020)

Singles from Game On
- 1. "Good Together" Released: January 19, 2018; 2. "Keep It Simple" Released: January 30, 2019; 3. "There's a Drink for That" Released: May 24, 2019; 4. "Slow Down Town" Released: February 12, 2020

Singles Only is the second EP by Canadian country music band James Barker Band, released on May 24, 2019. Upon its release, Singles Only debuted at number 68 on the Canadian Albums Chart. The EP includes the Platinum-certified #1 hit "Keep It Simple", and the Gold-certified top ten hits "Good Together" and "There's a Drink for That".

== Singles ==
"Good Together" was released as the debut single from the then-upcoming EP in January 2018, and peaked at #6 on the Canadian country radio chart. It went on to become the most-played Canadian song at Canadian country radio in 2018, and was certified Platinum by Music Canada.

"Keep It Simple" was released as the second single in January 2019, and went on to hit #1 on the Canadian country radio chart. It was released to American country radio in May 2019. It peaked at 87 on the Canadian Hot 100 and was certified Platinum by Music Canada.

"There's a Drink for That" was released as the third single to radio to coincide with the EP's release in May 2019, and would peak at #2 on the Canadian country radio chart. It was certified Gold by Music Canada.

"Slow Down Town" was released as the fourth single in February 2020, and would peak at #21 on the Canada Country chart.

== Track listing ==
No.	Title	Writer(s)	Length
1.	"There's a Drink for That"	James Barker; Gavin Slate; Travis Wood	3:07
2.	"Slow Down Town"	Barker; Slate; Wood	3:26
3.	"She's a Hit"	Barker; Slate; Wood; Todd Clark	2:54
4.	"If It Weren't For Girls"	Barker; Slate; Wood	2:55
5.	"Keep It Simple"	Barker; Clark; Slate; Wood	3:07
6.	"Want You In It"	Barker; Slate; Wood	3:12
7.	"Good Together"	Barker; Slate; Wood	3:23
Total length:			22:03

== Charts ==
=== EP ===
Chart (2017)	Peak position
Canadian Albums (Billboard)	68

=== Singles ===
Year	Single	Peak positions		Certifications
Year	Single	CAN Country	CAN	Certifications
2018	"Good Together"	6	—	MC: Platinum
2019	"Keep It Simple"	1	87	MC: Platinum
2019	"There's a Drink for That"	2	—	MC: Gold
2020	"Slow Down Town"	21	—	

== Awards and nominations ==
Year	Award	Category	Work	Result	Ref
2019	CCMA	Single of the Year	"Good Together	Nominated	
2020	CCMA	Album Of The Year	Singles Only	Nominated	
2020	CCMA	Single Of The Year	"Keep It Simple"	Won	
2020	CMAO Awards	Single of the Year	"Keep It Simple"	Won	
2020	CMAO Awards	Album of the Year	Singles Only	Nominated	
2020	CMAO Awards	Music Video of the Year	"Keep It Simple"	Won	

== Release history ==
Release formats for Singles Only
Country	Date	Format	Label	Ref.
Various	May 24, 2019	Digital download	Universal Music Canada	
Various	May 24, 2019	Compact disc	Universal Music Canada	
Various	May 24, 2019	Streaming	Universal Music Canada	
Various	April 17, 2020	Vinyl	Universal Music Canada	
