= Kiss Kiss (Madeline Merlo song) =

2020 song by Madeline Merlo

Single by Madeline Merlo
- Released: April 24, 2020
- Genre: Country pop
- Length: 3:12
- Label: Open Road
- Songwriter(s): Madeline Merlo; Allison Veltz Cruz; Jeff Pardo
- Producer(s): Jeff Pardo

Madeline Merlo singles chronology
"Dear Me" (2019)	"Kiss Kiss" (2020)	"It Didn't" (2020)

Music video
- "Kiss Kiss" on YouTube

"Kiss Kiss" is a song recorded and co-written by Canadian country pop artist Madeline Merlo. She wrote the track with Allison Veltz Cruz and Jeff Pardo, who produced the track. It became Merlo's seventh Top 20 hit.

== Background ==
Merlo told Sounds Like Nashville that "‘Kiss Kiss’ is an energetic step in a direction sonically I haven't gone before. Both the song and the music video feel mysterious and an exciting move in uncharted territory for my artistry. ‘Kiss Kiss’ represents the reckless place you can find yourself fresh off a breakup". The song was released shortly after Lady A recorded "Champagne Night", a track Merlo co-wrote and performed on NBC's Songland.

== Content ==
The song finds Merlo singing to a love interest in hopes of jointly getting over break-ups. Merlo told Canadian Beats Media, "This song is about one broken-hearted person finding another broken- hearted person. It’s about pretending to be in love. It’s about how we get through it. This song is phase one of heartbreak. ‘We’ll say it’s more than just a weekend rebound, it’s a lie but it’s a good one right now.’"

== Critical reception ==
CMT called the track "a flirty, modern track that also shows off her songwriting ability". Front Porch Music referred to the track as "dangerous and sexy, with a rebellious electric guitar" and "the classic get-over-him/her, with a little tease, and accepting the rebound as part of the healing process for many".

== Commercial performance ==
"Kiss Kiss" reached a peak of #13 on the Billboard Canada Country chart dated September 26, 2020, tying Merlo's fifth-highest-charting entry there. As of February 2023, "Kiss Kiss" had received over 1.8 million streams through Spotify.

== Music video ==
The official music video for "Kiss Kiss" premiered exclusively on CMT on August 3, 2020, and was directed by Brian K. Vaughn The video features Merlo at a masquerade party while her and a man both seek a rebound from a previous relationship. Merlo stated that the "video for ‘Kiss Kiss’ mirrors a step into a new space sonically for me with darker visuals to represent this fresh take on a breakup song".

== Chart performance ==
Chart (2020)	Peak position
Canada Country (Billboard)	13
