= Over All Over Again =

2021 song by James Barker Band

Single by James Barker Band
- Released: May 14, 2021
- Genre: Country
- Length: 3:21
- Label: Sony Nashville; Villa 40; Universal Canada
- Songwriter(s): James Barker; Todd Clark; Gavin Slate; Travis Wood
- Producer(s): Todd Clark

James Barker Band singles chronology
"Summer Time" (2020)	"Over All Over Again" (2021)	"New Old Trucks" (2021)

Lyric Video
- "Over All Over Again" on YouTube

"Over All Over Again" is a song recorded by Canadian country group James Barker Band. The song was co-written by the band's frontman James Barker, along with Gavin Slate, Travis Wood, and producer Todd Clark. It was their first single released after signing with Sony Music Nashville and Villa 40 in the United States.

== Background ==
The band's frontman James Barker wrote "Over All Over Again" with his co-writers during a two-day locked-down writing session in Nashville, Tennessee during the COVID-19 pandemic. He said it "felt like the right song at the right time" to be their first single on a U.S. label with Sony Music Nashville and Villa 40. Barker noted inspiration from Ronnie Milsap's "Smoky Mountain Rain", viewing at as a "refreshed" version of the band's music and their introduction to Nashville. He said there is a "kind of blueness to it from the darkness of the chords and melody, but the tempo keeps it clear of any gloomy territory".

== Critical reception ==
Caleigh DeCaprio of NY Country Swag stated that while the song speaks to a "relatively more serious situation" than the band's previous music, it contains the "effortlessly flawless vocals" and "unique sound and style" from the band. Katrina Milich of Complete Country called the track the "perfect song to blast while driving with the windows down", saying it is "fun and upbeat but so relatable". Madeline Crone of American Songwriter said the song "exhibits the band's growth while honing their craft in Nashville". Top Country named "Over All Over Again" their "Pick of the Week" for August 8, 2021, noting a "bluesy undertone".

== Accolades ==
Year	Association	Category	Result	Ref
2022	CCMA	Single Of The Year	Nominated	

== Commercial performance ==
"Over All Over Again" reached a peak of number one on Billboard Canada Country chart for the week of September 25, 2021, becoming the band's third chart-topper in their home country. It also peaked at number 68 on the Canadian Hot 100 for the week of August 21, 2021, marking their highest charting entry there, later surpassed by the song's follow-up single "New Old Trucks" in 2022. The song has been certified Gold by Music Canada.

== Credits and personnel ==
Credits adapted from AllMusic.

- Taylor Abram – backing vocals
- James Barker – lead vocals, guitar, songwriting
- Todd Clark — backing vocals, production, guitar, keyboard, programming, songwriting
- Dave Cohen – keyboard
- Jay Dufour – mixing
- Tony Lucido – bass guitar
- Darren McGill – mixing
- Andrew Mendelson – master engineering
- Justin Ostrander – guitar
- Jerry Roe – drums
- Gavin Slate – programming, songwriting
- Byron Sutton – acoustic guitar, mandolin
- Derek Wells – electric guitar
- Travis Wood – songwriting

== Charts ==
Chart performance for "Over All Over Again"
Chart (2021)	Peak position
Canada (Canadian Hot 100)	68
Canada Country (Billboard)	1

== Certifications ==
Region	Certification	Certified units/sales
Canada (Music Canada)	Gold	40,000^{‡}
^{‡} Sales+streaming figures based on certification alone.
