= War Paint (Madeline Merlo song) =

Single by Madeline Merlo

from the album Free Soul
- Released: June 24, 2016
- Genre: Country pop
- Length: 3:24
- Label: Open Road
- Songwriters: April Geesbreght; Madeline Merlo; Eric Olson
- Producer: EO

Madeline Merlo singles chronology
"Whatcha Wanna Do About It" (2016)	"War Paint" (2016)	"Over and Over" (2017)

"War Paint" is a song co-written and recorded by Canadian country music artist Madeline Merlo for her debut studio album, Free Soul (2016). Merlo wrote the song with April Geesbreght and Eric Olson, the latter of whom also produced the track under the moniker EO. "War Paint" was serviced to Canadian country radio on June 24, 2016, as the fifth single from Free Soul.

== Content ==
"War Paint" was inspired by Merlo's experience losing a friend to mental illness and features "more serious imagery and meaning" than her previous releases. The song is "about fighting for somebody going through a dark time," according to Merlo, and is "somewhat inspired by mental-health issues, but also about the people who have to take those things on." Lyrically, it describes the ways one stands by their loved ones in times of trouble, wearing their struggles "like war paint" so that they can fight together.

== Reception ==
=== Critical ===
In a review of Free Soul, Nanci Degg of Canadian Beats wrote that "War Paint" is "one song that you want to play over and over again," adding that "its rhythm cannot be denied." Soundcheck Entertainment cited the song as an album highlight in an uncredited review, writing that "War Paint" is "one track that particularly shined through."

=== Commercial ===
"War Paint" debuted at number 46 on the Canada Country chart dated August 6, 2016. It reached a peak position of 13 on the chart dated November 5, 2016, earning Merlo her second consecutive top twenty radio single. "War Paint" also reached number 47 on the comprehensive Canada All-Format Airplay chart.

== Music video ==
A special "unplugged" version of the song was recorded for the music video, which was produced by Rami Films under director Rami Mikhail. The video was released on June 10, 2016. Sounds Like Nashville complimented the stripped-down version, writing "we didn’t think it was possible, but we may love the song even more now."

== Charts ==
Chart (2016)	Peak position
Canada Country (Billboard)	13
