= Just Sayin' =

2016 song by James Barker Band

Single by James Barker Band

from the EP Game On
- Released: October 14, 2016
- Genre: Country
- Length: 3:07
- Label: Universal Canada
- Songwriters: James Barker; Todd Clark; Gavin Slate; Travis Wood
- Producer: Todd Clark

James Barker Band singles chronology
"Lawn Chair Lazy" (2016)	"Just Sayin'" (2016)	"Chills" (2017)

Music video
- "Just Sayin'" on YouTube

"Just Sayin'" is a song recorded by Canadian country group James Barker Band. The song was written by the band's lead singer James Barker, along with Travis Wood, Gavin Slate and producer Todd Clark. It was the second single from the band's debut extended play Game On.

== Background ==
James Barker said that after their debut single "Lawn Chair Lazy", which he classified as a "chill, summer-style song", the band "wanted to do something a little more upbeat". He called the song "a blast to play live".

== Commercial performance ==
"Just Sayin'" reached a peak of number seven on the Billboard Canada Country chart, becoming the band's second consecutive top ten hit after making their debut with "Lawn Chair Lazy". It has been certified Gold by Music Canada.

== Music video ==
The official music video was for "Just Sayin'" premiered on ET Canada on November 8, 2016, and features a cameo appearance by ET's Rick Campanelli. The video features a man trying to talk to different women at a bar while James Barker Band performs on the stage.

== Charts ==
Chart (2017)	Peak position
Canada Country (Billboard)	7

== Certifications ==
Region	Certification	Certified units/sales
Canada (Music Canada)	Gold	40,000^{‡}
^{‡} Sales+streaming figures based on certification alone.
