= Motel Flamingo =

Single by Madeline Merlo
- Released: May 19, 2017
- Genre: Country pop
- Length: 3:32
- Label: Open Road
- Songwriter(s): Nicolle Galyon; Neil Medley; Emily Weisband
- Producer(s): Karen Kosowski

Madeline Merlo singles chronology
"Over and Over" (2017)	"Motel Flamingo" (2017)	"Neon Love" (2018)

"Motel Flamingo" is a song recorded by Canadian country music singer and songwriter Madeline Merlo for her forthcoming second studio album. It was written by Nicolle Galyon, Neil Medley, and Emily Weisband. The song was released to digital retailers through Open Road Recordings on May 19, 2017 and to radio on May 24 as the album's lead single.

"Motel Flamingo" reached number eight on the Canada Country chart, becoming Merlo's highest-charting single to date.

== Critical reception ==
Nanci Dagg of Canadian Beats wrote that "Motel Flamingo" is a "great song" that encapsulates Merlo's "unique bohemian vibe." Top Country also complimented the song for reflecting Merlo's personality and called it a "vibrant single perfect for your summer playlist."

== Chart performance ==
"Motel Flamingo" debuted at number 49 on the Canada Country chart dated June 24, 2017 and peaked at number 8 on the chart dated September 23, 2017. With this position, the song surpassed "Whatcha Wanna Do About It" (which peaked at number ten) as Merlo's highest-charting single to date. For the week of September 16, "Motel Flamingo" was the highest-ranking single by a female artist on the chart.

== Music video ==
The official music video for "Motel Flamingo" was directed by Jaren Hayman and premiered August 7, 2017. It was filmed at the June Motel in Prince Edward County, Ontario. Featuring multiple references to the song's lyrics, including a front desk person resembling CeeLo Green to flamingo-shaped inflatable pool toys, the video finds Merlo throwing an "epic summer party."

== Charts ==
Chart (2017)	Peak position
Canada Country (Billboard)	8

== Release history ==
Country	Date	Format	Label	Ref.
North America	May 19, 2017	Digital download	Open Road	
Canada	May 24, 2017	Country radio	Open Road	
