= Madeline Merlo =

Canadian country pop singer-songwriter (born 1994)

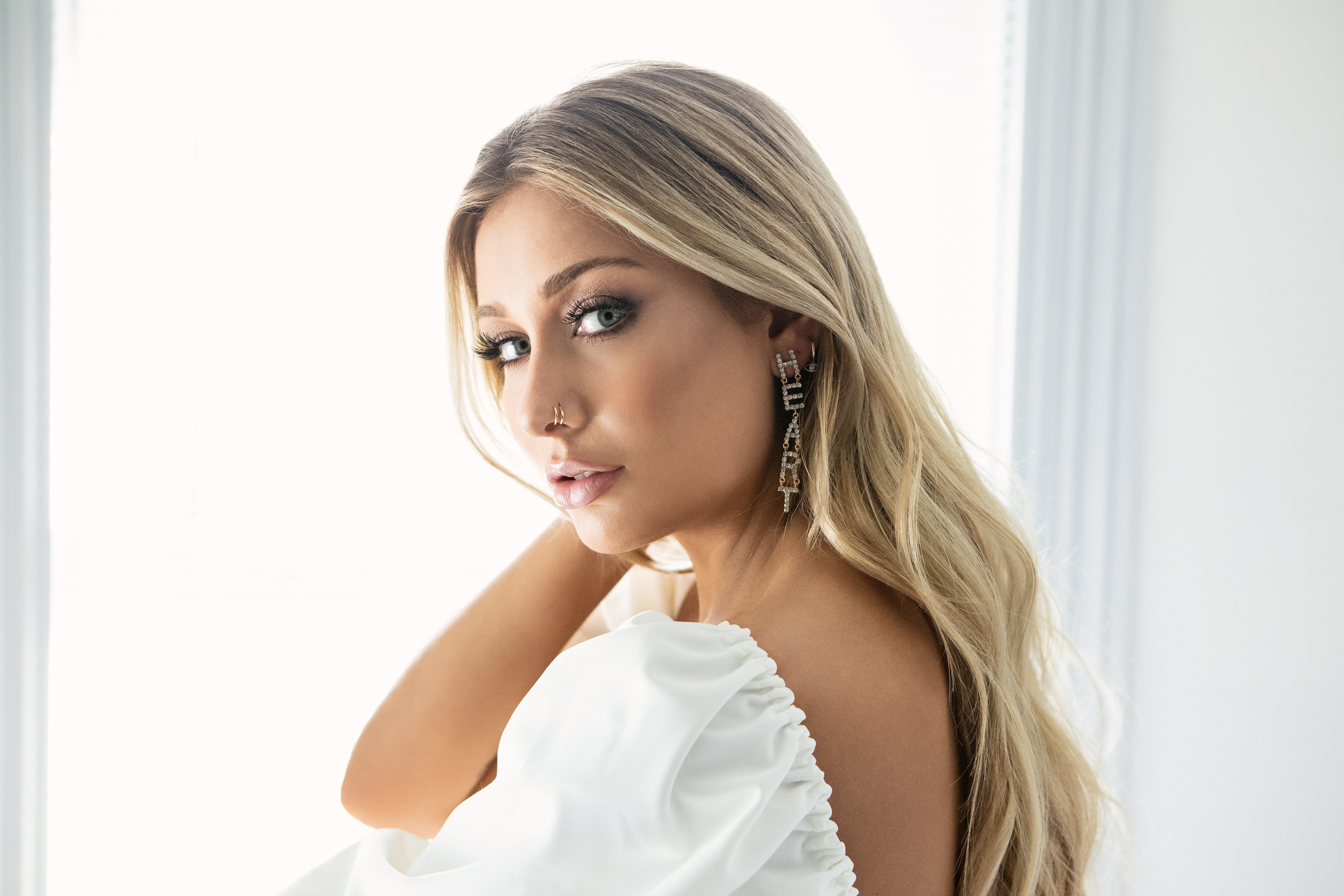
- Merlo in 2020

Background information
- Born: Madeline Rae Merlo; February 9, 1994 (age 32); Maple Ridge, British Columbia, Canada
- Origin: Maple Ridge, British Columbia, Canada
- Genres: Country; country-pop; pop
- Occupation: Singer-songwriter
- Years active: 2013–present
- Labels: Open Road; BBR Music Group; Wheelhouse; Stoney Creek
- Website: madelinemerlo.com

Madeline Rae Merlo (born February 9, 1994) is a Canadian country pop singer-songwriter. She signed to Open Road Recordings in 2013 and released her debut album, Free Soul, three years later. In 2015, Merlo received the "Rising Star" award from the Canadian Country Music Association. In 2021, she signed with the Nashville-based BBR Music Group, joining their imprint Wheelhouse Records, and later being re-assigned to Stoney Creek Records. In 2026, Merlo began releasing music as an independent artist.

== Early life ==
Merlo grew up in Maple Ridge, British Columbia. Growing up, her house was often filled with music. She had a desire to be a performer since the first time she sang in front of a crowd of people. In public school, she took part in her school talent show. She sang "Somewhere Over the Rainbow" and after that performance she decided that she wanted to be a singer.

Throughout high school, Merlo played in a band and together they began gigging around. She also continued to hone her vocal skills by performing in musical theatre productions and taking every opportunity she could to further her skills as a performer.

Merlo credits seeing Shania Twain at the first concert she ever attended to be the reason she pursued the genre of country music. Seeing a successful Canadian woman from a small town gave Merlo the confidence to pursue her career.

== Career ==
=== Music career ===
==== 2011–2017: Early career and Free Soul ====
At the age of 17 before she was signed, Merlo wrote songs and recorded music with BC-based writer and producer Dan Swinimer. Swinimer signed her to his production company "Manicdown Productions", and they worked together for nearly two years. In 2012, Swinimer invited RGK Entertainment's Ron Kitchener to Vancouver to see Merlo perform at the Railway Club. Merlo signed with RGK Entertainment and Open Road Recordings as a result in 2013. A year later in February 2014, she released her debut single, "Sinking Like a Stone" which was produced and co-written by Swinimer. It charted for twenty weeks on the Billboard Canada Country chart, peaking at number 32.

She released a self-titled extended play via Open Road Recordings on July 22, 2014. Her single "Honey Jack" became a hit in Canada, landing her the opening slot on The Road Trip Tour alongside Dean Brody and Paul Brandt. In 2015, Merlo won the CCMA Rising Star Award, and the BCCMA Female Artist of the Year. After those big wins, Madeline released a series of singles including "War Paint", "Over and Over", and "Whatcha Wanna Do About It" which entered into the top 10 at Canadian Country Radio. Her debut album Free Soul was released in 2016.

Her single "War Paint" from Free Soul garnered fan support on social media, and was the No. 1 Most Added country song in Canada in its debut week. It was written in response to the loss of one of her friends to mental illness. She dedicated the song to all those who suffer alone, hoping it might bring them hope, and a will to battle and survive. In 2017, "Motel Flamingo" was her 4th song to land in the Top 15 at Canadian Country Radio. Her next single "Neon Love" in 2018 also managed to enter the Top 15 at Canadian country radio making it her 5th single to enter in the Top 15.

==== 2020–present: Songland appearance, Slide and One House Down (from the Girl Next Door) ====
On April 13, 2020, Madeline won the first episode of the second season of Songland with her song "Champagne Night" written for Lady Antebellum and produced by Shane McAnally. She then released her seventh and eighth Top 20 singles in Canada, "Kiss Kiss" and "It Didn't".

In 2021, Merlo signed her debut U.S. record deal with BBR Music Group in Nashville. She subsequently released the extended play Slide via their imprint Wheelhouse Records on September 23, 2022. She also provided backing vocals on Cole Swindell's single "She Had Me at Heads Carolina. In 2023, she released the single "Tim + Faith". The song would become her first top five hit on the Billboard Canada Country chart.

In August 2024, Merlo released the single "Broken Heart Thing" featuring Dustin Lynch. The song was included on her extended play One House Down (from the Girl Next Door), which was released on October 11, 2024, via BBR's Stoney Creek Records. She was nominated for "Female Artist of the Year" at the 2024 Canadian Country Music Awards.

=== Acting career ===
In 2017, Merlo starred alongside Jana Kramer and Sophie Tweed-Simmons in the musical film, Country Crush, which saw her play the lead role of a young woman trying to make it as a country singer. She also did the singing voice of Sonata Dusk in My Little Pony: Equestria Girls – Rainbow Rocks.

== Personal life ==
Merlo moved to Nashville, Tennessee, in 2018. On April 22, 2023, at the Long Hollow Gardens in Gallatin, Tennessee, Merlo married Nashville Attorney Chase Fann.

== Filmography ==
Year	Title	Role	Notes
2014	My Little Pony: Equestria Girls – Rainbow Rocks	Sonata Dusk (voice)	As singing voice for Maryke Hendrikse's character
2016	Country Crush	Nancy Taylor	
2020	Songland	Herself	Episode: "Lady Antebellum"

== Discography ==
=== Studio albums ===
Title	Details	Peak positions
Title	Details	CAN
Free Soul	Release date: April 29, 2016; Label: Open Road	88

=== Extended plays ===
Title	Details
Madeline Merlo	Release date: July 22, 2014; Label: Open Road
Slide	Release date: September 23, 2022; Label: Wheelhouse
One House Down (From the Girl Next Door)	Release date: October 11, 2024; Label: Stoney Creek

=== Singles ===
Year	Title	Peak positions	Certifications	Album
Year	Title	CAN Country	Certifications	Album
2014	"Sinking Like a Stone"	32		Free Soul
2014	"Alive"	42		Free Soul
2015	"Honey Jack"	25		Free Soul
2016	"Whatcha Wanna Do About It"	10		Free Soul
2016	"War Paint"	13		Free Soul
2017	"Over and Over"	13		Free Soul
2017	"Motel Flamingo"	8		Non-album singles
2018	"Neon Love"	11	MC: Gold	Non-album singles
2019	"Unraveling"	23		Non-album singles
2019	"Dear Me"	10		Non-album singles
2020	"Kiss Kiss"	13		Non-album singles
2020	"It Didn't"	17	MC: Gold	Non-album singles
2022	"Slide"	6		Slide
2023	"Tim + Faith"	5		Non-album single
2024	"Broken Heart Thing" (featuring Dustin Lynch)	6	MC: Gold	One House Down (from the Girl Next Door)
2025	"Middle of the Bed"	8		One House Down (from the Girl Next Door)

==== Christmas singles ====
Year	Title	Album
2014	"Jolly Ol' Redneck"	Non-album singles
2016	"White Christmas"	Non-album singles

=== Music videos ===
Year	Video	Director
2014	"Sinking Like a Stone"	Adam Rothlein
2014	"Alive"	John "JP" Poliquin
2016	"Whatcha Wanna Do About It"	Adam Rothlein
2016	"War Paint" (Unplugged)	Rami Mikhail
2017	"Over and Over"	Rami Mikhail
2017	"Crush"	
2017	"Motel Flamingo"	Jaren Hayman
2018	"Neon Love"	Rami Mikhail
2019	"Dear Me"	Stephano Barberis
2020	"Kiss Kiss"	Brian K. Vaughn
2021	"It Didn't"	The Edde Brothers
2022	"Slide"	Preston Leatherman

== Awards and nominations ==
Year	Association	Category	Result
2015	British Columbia Country Music Association	Female Vocalist of the Year	Won
2015	Canadian Country Music Association	Rising Star	Won
2016	British Columbia Country Music Association	Female Vocalist of the Year	Won
2016	British Columbia Country Music Association	Album of the Year – Free Soul	Nominated
2016	British Columbia Country Music Association	Single of the Year – "What Ya Wanna Do About It"	Nominated
2016	British Columbia Country Music Association	Video of the Year – "War Paint"	Nominated
2017	Western Canadian Music Awards	Country Artist of the Year	Nominated
2017	Canadian Country Music Association	Female Artist of the Year	Nominated
2018	Canadian Country Music Association	Female Artist of the Year	Nominated
2021	Canadian Country Music Association	Songwriter of the Year - "Champagne Night" (shared with Shane McAnally, Hillary Scott, Charles Kelley, Dave Haywood, Tina Parol, David Thomson, Patricia Conroy, Ryan Tedder, Esther Dean, Andrew DeRoberts)	Won
2024	Canadian Country Music Association	Female Artist of the Year	Nominated
2025	Canadian Country Music Association	Female Artist of the Year	Nominated
2025	Canadian Country Music Association	Musical Collaboration of the Year — "Broken Heart Thing" (with Dustin Lynch)	Won
2025	Canadian Country Music Association	Songwriter(s) of the Year — "Broken Heart Thing" (with Zach Crowell, Lalo Guzman, James McNair, Michael Tyler)	Nominated
