= Tim + Faith =

2023 song by Madeline Merlo

Single by Madeline Merlo
- Released: September 15, 2023
- Genre: Country
- Length: 3:50
- Label: Wheelhouse; BMG
- Songwriter(s): Madeline Merlo; Jerry Flowers; Parker Welling; Stephony Smith; Zach Crowell
- Producer(s): Zach Crowell

Madeline Merlo singles chronology
"Slide" (2022)	"Tim + Faith" (2023)	"Broken Heart Thing" (2024)

Music video
- "Tim + Faith" on YouTube

"Tim + Faith" is a song co-written and recorded by Canadian country music artist Madeline Merlo. She wrote the song with Jerry Flowers, Parker Welling, and producer Zach Crowell. The song samples Tim McGraw's 1997 hit "It's Your Love", written by Stephony Smith. The title is a tribute to country music artists and married couple Tim McGraw and Faith Hill.

== Background ==
Merlo described "Tim + Faith" as her "first real love song" and "a song about a love song". The idea of the song is a couple hearing a song — Tim McGraw's "It's Your Love" — which "brings them back" to old memories together.

She stated that the song was sonically inspired by the country music of the 1990s decade, which she heard often growing up while preparing to ride horses in a barn in British Columbia. The song is also inspired by Tim McGraw and Faith Hill, with Merlo noting how the couple have "both been very open and transparent about their relationship and just how much they respect each other—and their loyalty to each other". The line "it's always you and me" is something Merlo stated that she and her husband say to each other often.

== Critical reception ==
Sara Harowitz of The Georgia Straight spoke favourably of "Tim + Faith", noting "catchy instrumentals, crescendoing chorus, lyrics that are meant to be belted". Jenna Melanson of Canadian Beats Media stated that the song "promises to be a captivating addition to Merlo's repertoire, known for her authentic storytelling and powerful vocals". Megan Grisham of Circle All Access said that the song "beautifully captures the essence of Tim and Faith’s legendary love story and their ability to be in the spotlight together", framing the song as "a lighthearted reminder of the magic of ’90s country music and the enduring power of love". Erica Zisman of Country Swag called "Tim + Faith" one of Merlo's "best yet", opining that she "raises the bar" with this song.

== Music video ==
The official music video for "Tim + Faith" premiered on YouTube on October 26, 2023.

== Charts ==
Chart performance for "Tim + Faith"
Chart (2023–2024)	Peak position
Canada Country (Billboard)	6
