= Over and Over (Madeline Merlo song) =

Single by Madeline Merlo

from the album Free Soul
- Released: January 20, 2017
- Genre: Country pop
- Length: 3:19
- Label: Open Road
- Songwriter(s): Jason Blaine; Jeff Pardo
- Producer(s): Matt Rovey

Madeline Merlo singles chronology
"War Paint" (2016)	"Over and Over" (2017)	"Motel Flamingo" (2017)

"Over and Over" (stylized on the cover as "Over & Over") is a song written by Jason Blaine and Jeff Pardo and recorded by Canadian country singer Madeline Merlo for her debut studio album, Free Soul (2016). It was released to Canadian country radio on January 20, 2017 as the album's sixth single.

The ballad, which explores a relationship in which the partners struggle between holding on and letting go, was heralded as a potential single following the release of Free Soul. The song entered the Canada Country chart at number 41.

== Content ==
"Over and Over" is about a "cyclical relationship" between people who continue to break up and then reconcile. The tumultuous relationship is presented as one that the two involved refuse to let end "even though it should."

== Critical reception ==
Nanci Degg of Canadian Beats wrote that the song is "a classic in the making," and had clear single potential.

== Commercial performance ==
"Over and Over" was the most-added Canadian single on country radio on January 20, 2017. The song debuted at number 41 on the Canada Country chart dated February 18, 2017. It has since reached a peak position of 13 on the chart dated April 15, 2017, matching the peak of her previous single, "War Paint".

== Music video ==
An accompanying music video was filmed for the song and released on January 20, 2017. Directed by Rami Mikhail, the video finds Merlo reminiscing on a former relationship and "[striving] to move forward."

== Charts ==
Chart (2017)	Peak position
Canada Country (Billboard)	13
