= James Barker Band =

Canadian country group

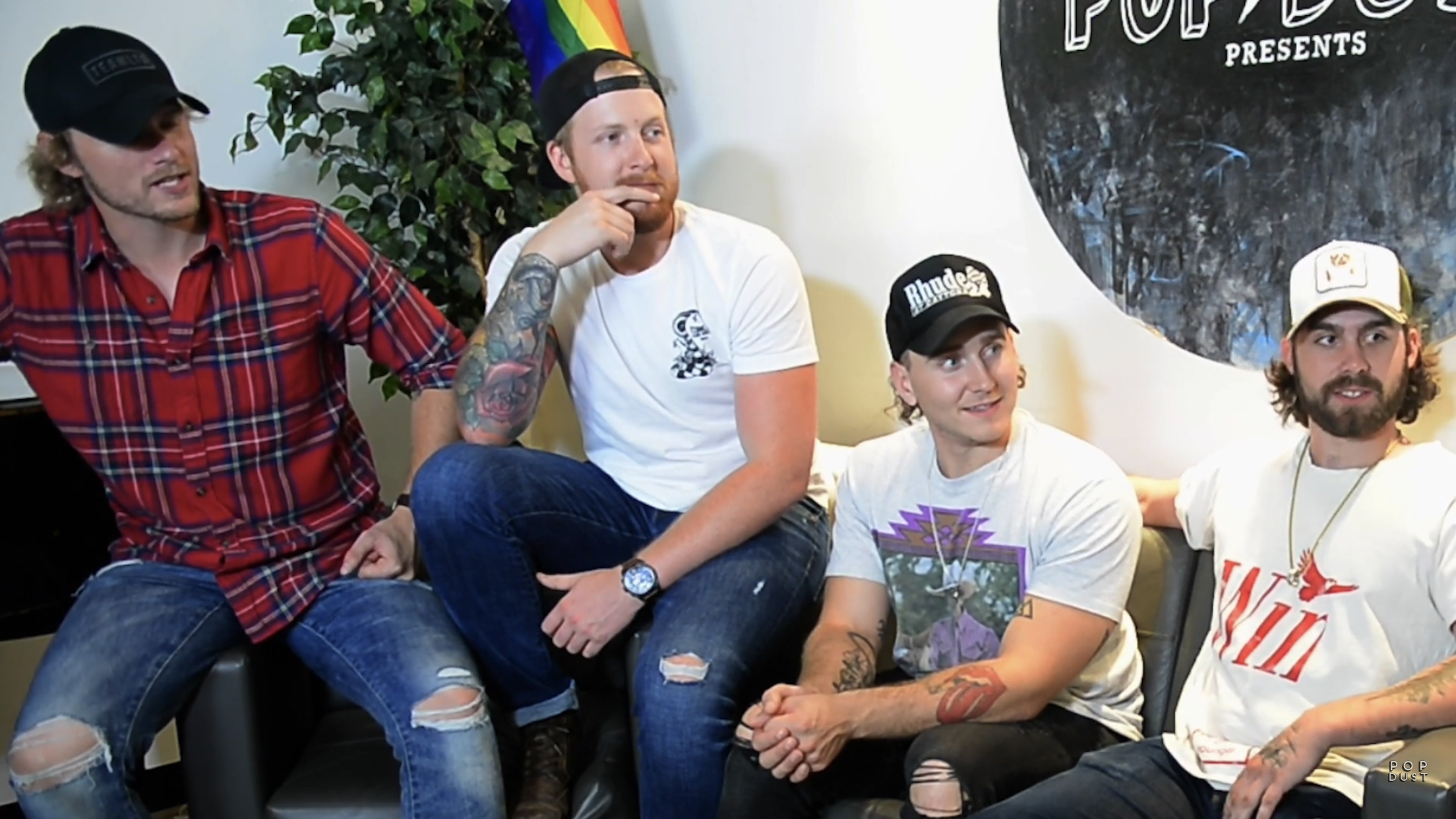
- James Barker Band in 2019; From left to right: James Barker, Taylor Abram, Bobby Martin, and Connor Stephen

Background information
- Origin: Woodville, Ontario, Canada
- Genre: Country
- Years active: 2013–present
- Labels: Universal Music Canada; Records; Starseed; Sony Music Nashville; Villa 40
- Members: James Barker; Taylor Abram; Connor Stephen; Bobby Martin
- Website: www.jamesbarkerband.com

The James Barker Band is a Canadian country group formed in Woodville, Ontario, in 2013. The band consists of James Barker, Taylor Abram, Connor Stephen, and Bobby Martin. In Canada, they have six number one country singles with "Chills", "Keep It Simple", "Over All Over Again", "New Old Trucks", "Meet Your Mama", and "You Didn't Hear It from Me". The band released the album One of Us on September 5, 2025.

== Career ==
In 2015, they won the Emerging Artist Showcase at the Boots and Hearts Music Festival and the following year, they were signed to Universal Music Canada. The band's debut extended play, Game On, was released April 21, 2017. The band received two Juno Award nominations for Breakthrough Group of the Year and Country Album of the Year at the 2018 Juno Awards, winning the second. In 2018, the band's song "Chills", cowritten by Barker, Gavin Slate, Travis Wood and Donovan Woods, received a SOCAN Songwriting Prize nomination and won the award for Single of the Year at the Canadian Country Music Awards.

The band became the first artist to record a globally released Spotify Singles session in Canada in November 2018. Their second extended play, Singles Only, was released May 24, 2019. It included the singles "Good Together", "Keep It Simple", "There's a Drink for That", and "Slow Down Town". They would follow that up with the standalone single "Summer Time" in June 2020, and the extended play JBB-Sides in August 2020.

In May 2021, they signed a record deal with Sony Music Nashville and Villa 40, and released the single "Over All Over Again", which became their third Canada Country number one. In October 2021, they released the song "New Old Trucks", which features American country singer Dierks Bentley. They followed that up with "Wastin' Whiskey" in 2022 on Starseed Records. In the spring and summer of 2022, the band joined Dallas Smith as an opening act on his headlining "Some Things Never Change Tour" across Canada. In January 2023, the band signed with Records Nashville, a joint venture between Sony Music Entertainment and Barry Weiss, and released the single "Meet Your Mama". They would follow that up with the single "On the Water" featuring American country artist Dalton Dover in May of 2023. Both songs are included on their extended play Ahead of Our Time, which was released on October 20, 2023.

In January 2025, the band released the single "You Didn't Hear It From Me", after returning to their original label Universal Music Canada. The song later became their sixth number one hit in Canada. They released their first full-length studio album One of Us on September 5, 2025. The band supported the album with the headlining "Bud Light Buckle Up Tour" across Canada in the fall of 2025.

The band was nominated for Juno Fan Choice and Country Album of the Year at the Juno Awards of 2026. They released the single "After Dark (Carry Me Home)" in June 2026. The band hosted the 2026 Canadian Country Music Association Awards, where they were nominated in five categories, and won two awards.

== Discography ==
=== Studio albums ===
Title	Details
One of Us	Released: September 5, 2025; Label: Universal Canada; Format: CD, vinyl, digital download, streaming

=== Extended plays ===
List of EPs, with selected details
Title	Details	Peak positions	Certifications
Title	Details	CAN	Certifications
Game On	Release date: April 21, 2017; Label: Universal Canada	29	MC: Gold
Singles Only	Release date: May 24, 2019; Label: Universal Canada	68	
JBB-Sides	Release date: August 21, 2020; Label: Universal Canada	—	
Ahead of Our Time	Release date: October 20, 2023; Label: Records Label	—	

=== Singles ===
List of singles, with selected peak chart positions and certifications
Title	Year	Peak positions			Certifications	Album
Title	Year	CAN	CAN Country	US Country Airplay	Certifications	Album
"Lawn Chair Lazy"	2016	—	3	—	MC: Platinum	Game On
"Just Sayin'"	2016	—	7	—	MC: Gold	Game On
"Chills"	2017	91	1	46	MC: 2× Platinum	Game On
"It's Working"	2017	—	3	—	MC: Gold	Game On
"Good Together"	2018	—	6	—	MC: Platinum	Singles Only
"Keep It Simple"	2019	87	1	—	MC: Platinum	Singles Only
"There's a Drink for That"	2019	—	2	—	MC: Gold	Singles Only
"Slow Down Town"	2020	—	21	—		Singles Only
"Summer Time"	2020	— (Note: "Summer Time" did not enter the Canadian Hot 100, but peaked at number 24 on the Hot Canadian Digital Song Sales chart.)	15	—	MC: Gold	Non-album singles
"Over All Over Again"	2021	68	1	—	MC: Gold	Non-album singles
"New Old Trucks" (with Dierks Bentley)	2021	63	1	—	MC: Gold	Non-album singles
"Wastin' Whiskey"	2022	67	2	—	MC: Gold	Non-album singles
"Meet Your Mama"	2023	85	1	—	MC: Gold	Ahead of Our Time
"On the Water" (featuring Dalton Dover)	2023	—	6	—		Ahead of Our Time
"Ahead of Our Time"	2023	—	9	—		Ahead of Our Time
"Your Mama Would Hate Me" (with Dean Brody)	2024	—	19	—		Non-album single
"You Didn't Hear It from Me"	2025	—	1	—	MC: Gold	One of Us
"Somebody I Know"	2025	—	2	—		One of Us
"After Dark"	2026	61	4	—		TBA
"—" denotes a recording that failed to chart or was not released to that territory

=== Promotional singles ===
List of promotional singles
Title	Year	Album
"Beer Me"	2022	Non-album singles
"Rain All Summer"	2022	Non-album singles
"Champagne"	2023	Ahead of Our Time
"Caught Me at a Good Time"	2025	One of Us
"I Don't See Why Not"	2025	One of Us
"One of Us"	2025	One of Us

=== Music videos ===
List of music videos
Title	Year
"Lawn Chair Lazy"	2016
"Just Sayin"	2016
"Chills"	2017
"It's Working"	2017
"Keep It Simple"	2019
"There’s a Drink for That"	2019
"Slow Down Town"	2020

== Awards and nominations ==
Year	Award	Category	Nominee/work	Result	Ref
2017	CMAO Awards	Fan's Choice	James Barker Band	Won	
2017	CMAO Awards	Group or Duo of the Year	James Barker Band	Nominated	
2017	CMAO Awards	Single of the Year	"Lawn Chair Lazy"	Nominated	
2017	CMAO Awards	Music Video of the Year	"Chills"	Nominated	
2017	CCMA	Album of the Year	Game On	Nominated	
2017	CCMA	Group or Duo of the Year	James Barker Band	Nominated	
2017	CCMA	Rising Star Award	James Barker Band	Nominated	
2017	CCMA	Single of the Year	"Lawn Chair Lazy"	Nominated	
2017	CCMA	Video of the Year	"Chills"	Nominated	
2017	Canadian Radio Music Awards	Best New Group or Solo Artist: Country	"Lawn Chair Lazy"	Won	
2018	JUNO Awards	Breakthrough Group of the Year	James Barker Band	Nominated	
2018	JUNO Awards	Country Album of the Year	Game On	Won	
2018	CCMA	Fan's Choice Award	James Barker Band	Nominated	
2018	CCMA	Group or Duo of the Year	James Barker Band	Nominated	
2018	CCMA	Single of the Year	"Chills"	Won	
2018	CCMA	Top Selling Canadian Single of the Year	"Chills"	Won	
2019	CCMA	Fan's Choice Award	James Barker Band	Nominated	
2019	CCMA	Group or Duo of the Year	James Barker Band	Nominated	
2019	CCMA	Interactive Artist of the Year	James Barker Band	Nominated	
2019	CCMA	Single of the Year	"Good Together"	Nominated	
2020	CCMA	Album Of The Year	Singles Only	Nominated	
2020	CCMA	Fans’ Choice Award	James Barker Band	Nominated	
2020	CCMA	Group Or Duo Of The Year	James Barker Band	Nominated	
2020	CCMA	Single Of The Year	"Keep It Simple"	Won	
2020	CMAO Awards	Single of the Year	"Keep It Simple"	Won	
2020	CMAO Awards	Album of the Year	Singles Only	Nominated	
2020	CMAO Awards	Group or Duo of the Year	James Barker Band	Nominated	
2020	CMAO Awards	Music Video of the Year	"Keep It Simple"	Won	
2020	CMAO Awards	Fans' Choice	James Barker Band	Nominated	
2021	CMAO Awards	Fans' Choice	James Barker Band	Nominated	
2021	2021 Canadian Country Music Awards	Interactive Artist or Group of the Year	James Barker Band	Nominated	
2022	CMAO Awards	Fans' Choice	James Barker Band	Nominated	
2022	Canadian Country Music Association	Entertainer of the Year	James Barker Band	Nominated	
2022	Canadian Country Music Association	Fans' Choice	James Barker Band	Nominated	
2022	Canadian Country Music Association	Group or Duo of the Year	James Barker Band	Nominated	
2022	Canadian Country Music Association	Interactive Artist or Group of the Year	James Barker Band	Nominated	
2022	Canadian Country Music Association	Single of the Year	"Over All Over Again"	Nominated	
2023	CMAO Awards	Fans' Choice	James Barker Band	Nominated	
2023	CMAO Awards	Group or Duo of the Year	James Barker Band	Nominated	
2023	Canadian Country Music Association	Fans' Choice	—N/a	Won	
2023	Canadian Country Music Association	Group or Duo of the Year	—N/a	Won	
2023	Canadian Country Music Association	Single of the Year	"Wastin' Whiskey"	Nominated	
2024	Juno Awards	Country Album of the Year	Ahead of Our Time	Won	
2024	CMAO Awards	Album / EP of the Year	Ahead of Our Time	Nominated	
2024	CMAO Awards	Compass Award	—N/a	Won	
2024	CMAO Awards	Fans' Choice	—N/a	Nominated	
2024	CMAO Awards	Group or Duo of the Year	—N/a	Won	
2024	Canadian Country Music Association	Fans' Choice	—N/a	Won	
2024	Canadian Country Music Association	Group or Duo of the Year	—N/a	Won	
2024	Canadian Country Music Association	Single of the Year	"Meet Your Mama"	Nominated	
2025	Canadian Country Music Association	Group or Duo of the Year	—N/a	Won	
2025	Canadian Country Music Association	Musical Collaboration of the Year	"Your Mama Would Hate Me" (with Dean Brody)	Nominated	
2026	Juno Awards	Juno Fan Choice	—N/a	Nominated	
