= Sell Control for Life's Speed =

Studio album by Pilot Speed
- Released: April 25, 2006 (Canada); May 2, 2006 (U.S.)
- Recorded: 2005
- Genre: Rock
- Length: 53:16
- Label: MapleMusic Recordings (Canada); MRCD 6454
- Producer: João Carvalho

Pilot Speed chronology
Caught by the Window (2003)	Sell Control for Life's Speed (2006)	Wooden Bones (2009)

Sell Control for Life's Speed is the second album by Canadian rock band Pilot Speed (at the time known as Pilate). It was recorded at The Armoury, Vancouver BC (tracks 1, 2, 5–11) and at Phase One Studios, Toronto ON (tracks 3, 4).

The album was released in Canada on April 25, 2006, and reached #108 on the Canadian Albums Chart. In the United States, the album was released on September 19, 2006, with the album title changed from Sell Control for Life's Speed to Into the West. The albums also feature slightly different track listings. "Lover Come In", which was track 8 on the original album, is replaced by two tracks, "Into Your Hideout" and "Alright", which are tracks 8 and 9 on the U.S. version although those songs were on their debut album Caught by the Window. Both tracks are presented on alternate mixes.

"Barely Listening" was featured in the videogame NHL 07.

== Track listing ==
All songs by Pilate, all words by Todd Clark.

No.	Title	Length
1.	"Knife-Grey Sea"	4:57
2.	"Barely Listening"	4:04
3.	"A Kind of Hope"	4:22
4.	"Over-Ground"	4:57
5.	"Don't Stare"	8:12
6.	"I Won't Blame You"	3:57
7.	"Turn the Lights On"	4:32
8.	"Lover Come In"	3:50
9.	"Ambulance"	4:21
10.	"Hold the Line"	4:26
11.	"Into the West"	5:33

=== U.S. version "Into The West" ===
No.	Title	Length
1.	"Knife-Grey Sea"	4:57
2.	"Barely Listening"	4:04
3.	"A Kind of Hope"	4:22
4.	"Over-Ground"	4:57
5.	"Don't Stare"	8:12
6.	"I Won't Blame You"	3:57
7.	"Turn the Lights On"	4:32
8.	"Into Your Hideout"	3:54
9.	"Alright"	5:12
10.	"Ambulance"	4:21
11.	"Hold the Line"	4:26
12.	"Into the West"	5:33
