= Chills (James Barker Band song) =

Single by James Barker Band

from the album Game On
- Released: March 3, 2017
- Genre: Country
- Length: 3:11
- Label: Universal Canada; New Revolution
- Songwriter(s): James Barker; Travis Wood; Gavin Slate; Donovan Woods
- Producer(s): Todd Clark

James Barker Band singles chronology
"Just Sayin'" (2016)	"Chills" (2017)	"It's Working" (2017)

"Chills" is a song recorded by Canadian country music group James Barker Band for their debut extended play, Game On (2017). It was released March 3, 2017 through Universal Music Canada as the collection's third single. Lead singer James Barker co-wrote the song with Gavin Slate, Donovan Woods, and Travis Wood. The song impacted American country radio on October 23, 2017, as the group's debut single in the United States.

"Chills" has become the group's most successful single to date, becoming their first release to hit number one on the Canada Country chart and their first to chart on the Canadian Hot 100. In the United States, "Chills" also became their first single to chart on the Billboard Country Airplay chart, reaching a peak position of 49.

== Critical reception ==
Country music blog The Shotgun Seat wrote that "Chills" is "a clear standout" on the EP, "with its rolling rhythm and fast-paced chorus." Annie Reuter of Sounds Like Nashville wrote that the song "solidif[ies] the band's staying power," and called it "infectious."

In 2018, the song received a SOCAN Songwriting Prize nomination, and won the award for Single of the Year at the Canadian Country Music Awards.

== Commercial performance ==
"Chills" debuted at number 38 on the Billboard Canada Country chart dated April 1, 2017. It reached number 1 on the chart dated July 1, 2017. This makes it the group's highest-charting single (surpassing the number 3 peak of their debut hit, "Lawn Chair Lazy") and their first chart-topper. "Chills" also entered the Canadian Hot 100 chart dated May 20, 2017 at number 94, becoming their first single to appear on the chart. It reached its peak position of 91 the following week, on the chart dated May 27, 2017. "Chills" was certified Platinum by Music Canada in April 2019, indicating digital sales of over 80,000 copies, and was later certified Double Platinum in July 2023.

== Music video ==
An accompanying music video directed by Ben Knechtel premiered on March 24, 2017. The video follows a fictionalized date between social media influencer Kristen Hancher and her boyfriend Andrew Gregory. Clips of the band performing on a stage with a lighted backdrop are also interspersed with the date scenes.

== Charts ==
Chart (2017–18)	Peak position
Canada (Canadian Hot 100)	91
Canada Country (Billboard)	1
US Country Airplay (Billboard	49

=== Year-end charts ===
Chart (2017)	Position
Canada Country (Billboard)	23

== Certifications ==
Region	Certification	Certified units/sales
Canada (Music Canada)	2× Platinum	160,000^{‡}
^{‡} Sales+streaming figures based on certification alone.
