= Pilot Speed =

Canadian rock band

- Origin: Toronto, Ontario, Canada
- Genres: Alternative rock Indie rock
- Years active: 1999–2010
- Labels: MapleMusic Recordings (Canada); Wind-up Records (U.S.)
- Members: Todd Clark; Chris Greenough; Ruby Bumrah; Bill Keeley

Pilot Speed (formerly known as Pilate) was a Canadian rock band, who were active in the early 2000s.

Based in Toronto, Ontario, the band consisted of vocalist and pianist Todd Clark, guitarist Chris Greenough, bassist Ruby Bumrah, and drummer Bill Keeley. Clark was a graduate of the music program at the University of Western Ontario, while all of the other three members were alumni of OCAD University.

== History ==
The band released their debut EP, For All That's Given, Wasted, independently in 2001 before signing to MapleMusic Recordings, which released their full-length debut album Caught by the Window in 2003. The album was most noted for the single "Into Your Hideout", which peaked at #3 on Canada's rock radio chart. The song's music video, directed by Maxime Giroux, won the MuchMusic Video Award for Best Independent Video at the 2004 MuchMusic Video Awards, and was a Juno Award nominee for Video of the Year at the Juno Awards of 2004.

The band followed up in 2006 with the album Sell Control for Life's Speed. Just a few weeks after the album's Canadian release, the band opted to change their name to Pilot Speed after securing an American deal with Wind-up Records, due to the risk of being sued by other American bands named Pilate; they had briefly considered keeping the name Pilate in Canada while using a different name only in the United States, but ruled that option out. The album was released in the United States under the title Into the West.

The band's third and final album, Wooden Bones, was released in 2009.

== Discography ==
=== Albums ===
- Caught by the Window (2003)
- Sell Control for Life's Speed (2006)
- Wooden Bones (2009)

=== EPs ===
- For All That's Given, Wasted (2001)
- The Window (2003)

=== Singles ===
- "Into Your Hideout"
- "Alright"
- "Melt into the Walls"
- "Overrated"
- "The Volunteer"
- "Barely Listening"
- "Ambulance"
- "Put the Phone Down"

=== Other contributions ===
- Maybe This Christmas Tree (2004, Nettwerk) - "Fairytale of New York"
- Northern Songs: Canada's Best and Brightest (2008, Hear Music) - "Knife-Gray Sea"
