= 2023 in country music =

This is a list of notable events in country music that took place in 2023.

== Events ==
- January 6 – Marty Stuart invites Henry Cho and Gary Mule Deer to become the newest members of the Grand Ole Opry, the first time comedians have been invited in almost 50 years following Jerry Clower in 1973. Cho is the first Asian person to become a member of the Opry. They were inducted on February 11 and March 10 respectively.
- January 23 – Gabby Barrett's "Pick Me Up", Lainey Wilson's "Heart Like a Truck" and Carly Pearce's "What He Didn't Do", all reach #4, #8 and #10 respectively at US Country Radio (as measured by Mediabase). This marks the first time since 2020 that three solo women have charted in the top ten simultaneously.
- February 11 – Kane Brown and his wife Katelyn Brown top the Country Airplay chart with "Thank God", making it the second duet by a married couple to top that chart following Tim McGraw and Faith Hill's "It's Your Love" in 1997.
- March 15 – Miranda Lambert announces that she is leaving Sony Music Nashville after 19 years.
- March 20 – Several artists hold Love Rising, a charity concert organized by Allison Russell at Bridgestone Arena in Nashville, to raise awareness and funds for the LGBTQIA+ community of Tennessee.
- March 23 – Record label Arista Nashville closes after 34 years in operation.
- March 27 – The Band Perry officially announce that they are going on hiatus.
- March 31 – 4 Runner reunites for the second time and releases their first studio album in 20 years.
- April 11 – Granger Smith announces that he will be leaving country music in order to focus on ministry at his local church outside of Austin, Texas.
- April 23 – Morgan Wallen cancels show at Vaught–Hemingway Stadium in Oxford, Mississippi just minutes before taking the stage due to vocal problems. The cancellation caused outrage in some fans including lawsuits being filed even though tickets were refunded. Rumors quickly spread stating that he was drunk and had to go to the hospital to get his stomach pumped, however those rumors were debunked. Morgan has since postponed the following weeks shows to be on vocal rest.
- April 28 – While performing on stage at Stagecoach Festival, Alan Jackson appears via video link to invite Jon Pardi to become the newest member of the Grand Ole Opry.
- May 11 – Jimmie Allen, his management company and record producer Ash Bowers have a lawsuit filed against them by an unnamed former manager who alleged that Allen repeatedly verbally and sexually assaulted her and that she was fired for disclosing this abuse. As a result, Allen's record label suspended him immediately and he was dropped from a planned performance slot at the 50th CMA Music Festival. Allen was subsequently dropped from the label after a second accuser came forward.
- May 15 – Reba McEntire is announced as a coach for the 24th season of The Voice, which premiered in the fall of 2023.
- June 8–11 – CMA Music Festival celebrates its milestone 50th anniversary in Nashville, revolving around the nightly concerts at Nissan Stadium.
- June 28 – Rosanne Cash and John Leventhal launch their own label, RumbleStrip Records.
- July 1 – Tracy Chapman becomes the first black woman to have a chart-topping country song as a sole writer when Luke Combs' cover of her 1988 hit "Fast Car" reached number one on the Country Airplay chart. It also becomes the first country cover of a pop hit to top the chart since Blake Shelton's cover of Michael Bublé's 2005 single "Home" did so in July 2008.
- July 8 – Following the retirement of drummer Brian Prout and mandolinist Gene Johnson from Diamond Rio, they are respectively replaced by Micah Schweinsberg and Carson McKee. This is the first lineup change to Diamond Rio in 25 years, and it results in McKee becoming the band's first female member.
- July 15 – Miranda Lambert causes controversy during her performance of "Tin Man" at her Velvet Rodeo residency in Las Vegas, by scolding a group of fans taking selfies as she was starting the song. The incident divided fans on social media.
- July 18 – Jason Aldean receives significant media attention for the lyrical content of his single "Try That in a Small Town", with many listeners criticizing the song for its lyrical content and the imagery used in the music video. In response, CMT withdrew the video from their channel.
- July 21 – Jeanne Pruett celebrates her 50th Grand Ole Opry Anniversary
- July 22 – Bill Anderson is honored as the Grand Ole Opry's longest-serving member in the show's history. Anderson's membership has not lapsed in 62 years since his initial induction in 1961.
- July 31 – For the first time in history, country songs hold the top three positions on the all-genre Billboard Hot 100 chart: Aldean's "Try That in a Small Town", Morgan Wallen's "Last Night", and Combs' "Fast Car". "Try That in a Small Town" becomes the 21st song to reach number one on both the Billboard Hot 100 and the Hot Country Songs charts.
- August 27 – Ty Herndon marries his husband, Alex Schwartz.
- September 9 – Luke Combs becomes the first artist to simultaneously occupy the top two positions on the Country Airplay chart as a solo act with no accompanying acts when his singles "Love You Anyway" and "Fast Car" occupy the number one and two positions, respectively. In doing so, he also becomes the second act overall to accomplish such a feat after Luke Bryan achieved the same in May 2014 with his single "Play It Again" and his appearance on Florida Georgia Line's "This Is How We Roll".
- September 15 – Maren Morris announces her exit from the country music industry.
- October 3 – Ronnie Milsap performs his final Nashville show at the Bridgestone Arena joined by more than thirty guest artists. Though he is retiring from performing, he will continue to record.
- October 7 – Sara Evans becomes a member of the Grand Ole Opry and is inducted by Crystal Gayle. She was invited on August 18 by Bill Anderson, Lady A and Carly Pearce during a 25th anniversary concert at the Ryman Auditorium.
- October 24 – Jon Pardi becomes the first California native to become a member of the Opry. He was inducted by Garth Brooks.
- November 1 – Emerson Drive announces that they will embark on their final run of touring in 2024
- December 3 – Scotty McCreery is invited by Garth Brooks to become the next Opry member, with his induction set for early 2024.
- December 5 – Brenda Lee's "Rockin' Around the Christmas Tree" hits number one for the first time on the Billboard Hot 100. At 78, the feat makes Lee the oldest artist to have a number one single in the chart's history, and the artist with the longest gap between number ones, following 1960's "I Want to Be Wanted", along with breaking several other major chart records.
- December 6 – Taylor Swift is named Time magazine's Person of the Year, becoming the first such subject honored specifically for achievement in the arts. The magazine cited her 2023–2024 Eras Tour, which was set to become the highest-grossing concert tour of all time, and its significant cultural and economic impact. It is Swift's second Person of the Year distinction, after having been named as part of "The Silence Breakers" in 2017.

== Top hits of the year ==
The following songs placed within the Top 20 on the Hot Country Songs, Country Airplay, or Canada Country charts in 2023:

=== Singles released by American and Australian artists ===
Songs	Airplay	Canada	Single	Artist	References
11	35	—	"5 Leaf Clover"	Luke Combs	
11	56	—	"'98 Braves"	Morgan Wallen	
6	—	—	"Ain't That Some"	Morgan Wallen	
17	1	4	"Angels (Don't Always Have Wings)"	Thomas Rhett	
10	—	—	"Better Than Revenge (Taylor's Version)"	Taylor Swift	
15	—	—	"Born with a Beer in My Hand"	Morgan Wallen	
9	—	—	"Boys of Faith"	Zach Bryan featuring Bon Iver	
31	11	7	"Brown Eyes Baby"	Keith Urban	
8	1	1	"Bury Me in Georgia"	Kane Brown	
19	4	2	"But I Got a Beer in My Hand"	Luke Bryan	
10	1	6	"Can't Have Mine (Find You a Girl)"	Dylan Scott	
6	2	1	"Dancin' in the Country"	Tyler Hubbard	
11	—	—	"Dawns"	Zach Bryan featuring Maggie Rogers	
9	—	—	"Dear John (Taylor's Version)"	Taylor Swift	
12	—	—	"Deep Satin"	Zach Bryan	
13	—	—	"Devil Don't Know"	Morgan Wallen	
16	2	27	"Down Home"	Jimmie Allen	
22	13	4	"Drinkaby"	Cole Swindell	
7	—	—	"East Side of Sorrow"	Zach Bryan	
15	—	—	"El Dorado"	Zach Bryan	
7	—	—	"Enchanted (Taylor's Version)"	Taylor Swift	
7	3	1	"Everything I Love"	Morgan Wallen	
24	17	2	"Everything She Ain't"	Hailey Whitters	
1	1	1	"Fast Car"	Luke Combs	
12	—	—	"Fear and Friday's"	Zach Bryan	
19	—	—	"Fear and Friday's (Poem)"	Zach Bryan	
19	3	8	"Girl in Mine"	Parmalee	
15	2	7	"God Gave Me a Girl"	Russell Dickerson	
5	1	1	"Going, Going, Gone"	Luke Combs	
20	2	1	"Gold"	Dierks Bentley	
—	18	38	"Good Day for Living"	Joe Nichols	
18	58	—	"Growin' Up and Gettin' Old"	Luke Combs	
10	2	4	"Handle on You"	Parker McCollum	
—	20	24	"Hate My Heart"	Carrie Underwood	
7	2	1	"Heart Like a Truck"	Lainey Wilson	
14	—	—	"Heartbroken"	Diplo, Jessie Murph and Polo G	
5	—	—	"Hey Driver"	Zach Bryan featuring The War and Treaty	
17	—	—	"Holy Roller"	Zach Bryan featuring Sierra Ferrell	
20	—	—	"Hope That's True"	Morgan Wallen	
—	16	—	"How It Oughta Be"	Shane Profitt	
15	8	3	"Human"	Cody Johnson	
3	—	—	"I Can See You"	Taylor Swift	
9	60	—	"I Wrote the Book"	Morgan Wallen	
32	17	2	"If You Go Down (I'm Goin' Down Too)"	Kelsea Ballerini	
13	3	4	"It Matters to Her"	Scotty McCreery	
1	1	1	"Last Night"	Morgan Wallen	
26	13	23	"Looking for You"	Chris Young	
3	1	1	"Love You Anyway"	Luke Combs	
7	4	1	"Memory Lane"	Old Dominion	
3	1	1	"Need a Favor"	Jelly Roll	
7	2	1	"Next Thing You Know"	Jordan Davis	
15	—	—	"Nine Ball"	Zach Bryan	
25	18	3	"No Body"	Blake Shelton	
2	8	1	"One Thing at a Time"	Morgan Wallen	
10	—	—	"Overtime"	Zach Bryan	
18	—	—	"Pain, Sweet Pain"	Zach Bryan	
14	6	14	"Pick Me Up"	Gabby Barrett	
16	—	—	"Red"	Hardy featuring Morgan Wallen	
4	1	1	"Religiously"	Bailey Zimmerman	
1	40	—	"Rich Men North of Richmond"	Oliver Anthony	
2	1	1	"Rock and a Hard Place"	Bailey Zimmerman	
5	—	—	"Sarah's Place"	Zach Bryan featuring Noah Kahan	
6	1	1	"Save Me"	Jelly Roll with Lainey Wilson	
18	—	—	"Smaller Acts"	Zach Bryan	
1	20	28	"Something in the Orange"	Zach Bryan	
8	1	7	"Son of a Sinner"	Jelly Roll	
8	—	—	"Sparks Fly (Taylor's Version)"	Taylor Swift	
6	—	—	"Spotless"	Zach Bryan featuring The Lumineers	
14	2	3	"Standing Room Only"	Tim McGraw	
13	2	2	"Stars Like Confetti"	Dustin Lynch	
11	—	—	"Summertime's Close"	Zach Bryan	
11	—	—	"Sunrise"	Morgan Wallen	
18	—	—	"Tennessee Numbers"	Morgan Wallen	
10	4	3	"Tennessee Orange"	Megan Moroney	
2	1	3	"Thank God"	Kane Brown with Katelyn Brown	
19	5	9	"That's What Tequila Does"	Jason Aldean	
3	1	1	"Thinkin' Bout Me"	Morgan Wallen	
1	1	1	"Thought You Should Know"	Morgan Wallen	
14	—	—	"Ticking"	Zach Bryan	
8	—	—	"Tourniquet"	Zach Bryan	
1	2	49	"Try That in a Small Town"	Jason Aldean	
5	2	2	"Wait in the Truck"	Hardy featuring Lainey Wilson	
27	15	33	"Water Under the Bridge"	Sam Hunt	
7	1	1	"Watermelon Moonshine"	Lainey Wilson	
28	12	21	"We Got History"	Mitchell Tenpenny	
11	2	5	"What He Didn't Do"	Carly Pearce	
8	1	3	"What My World Spins Around"	Jordan Davis	
16	—	—	"Whiskey Friends"	Morgan Wallen	
11	1	1	"Whiskey on You"	Nate Smith	
12	3	–	"Wild as Her"	Corey Kent	
8	—	—	"Wild Ones"	Jessie Murph with Jelly Roll	
7	1	1	"World on Fire"	Nate Smith	
20	—	—	"Wreckage"	Nate Smith	
22	3	27	"You"	Dan + Shay	
18	10	26	"You Didn't"	Brett Young	
8	3	2	"You, Me, & Whiskey"	Justin Moore featuring Priscilla Block	
11	4	3	"Your Heart or Mine"	Jon Pardi	

=== Singles released by Canadian artists ===
Songs	Canada	Single	Artist	References
–	10	"Back to Drinkin' Whiskey"	Tyler Joe Miller	
–	20	"Budweiser"	Nate Haller	
–	3	"Chasing Tornadoes"	MacKenzie Porter	
–	20	"Country Dance"	Aaron Goodvin	
–	4	"Do This Life"	High Valley (with Alison Krauss)	
–	10	"Girl to Girl"	Tenille Arts	
–	12	"Good Ol' Days"	The Reklaws	
–	15	"Greatest Show on Dirt"	Meghan Patrick	
–	10	"Heartbreaker"	Jess Moskaluke	
–	1	"Honky Tonkin' About"	The Reklaws (with Drake Milligan)	
–	14	"I Run on Country"	The Washboard Union	
–	5	"The Last Time"	Tenille Townes	
–	20	"Love Me Like an Outlaw"	Kalsey Kulyk	
–	3	"Meet Your Mama"	James Barker Band	
–	10	"Never Met a Beer"	Tyler Joe Miller and Matt Lang	
–	4	"On a Different Night"	Josh Ross	
–	6	"On the Water"	James Barker Band (featuring Dalton Dover)	
–	5	"Outta Yours"	Steven Lee Olsen	
–	5	"Rodeo Queen"	Jade Eagleson	
–	10	"Second Guessing"	Griffen Palmer	
–	8	"Settle for a Drink"	Shawn Austin	
–	11	"Shoulda Known Better"	Tyler Joe Miller	
–	5	"Singing in a Beer"	Dallas Smith	
–	6	"Slide"	Madeline Merlo	
–	10	"Slip"	Shawn Austin	
–	6	"Small Town Somethin'"	High Valley	
–	7	"Talk to Time"	Tim Hicks	
–	5	"Take Me Backroad"	Tim and the Glory Boys (featuring High Valley)	
–	8	"The Road That Raised You Up"	Jason Blaine	
43	1	"Trouble"	Josh Ross	
–	11	"Watch It"	Brett Kissel	
–	15	"You Ain't"	Aaron Goodvin (featuring Meghan Patrick)	
–	4	"You Got the Wrong Guy"	Dean Brody	

== Top new album releases ==
US	Album	Artist	Record label	Release date	Reference
7	20 Number Ones	Thomas Rhett	Valory	September 29	
9	Bigger Houses	Dan + Shay	Warner Nashville	September 15	
3	Bluebird Days	Jordan Davis	MCA Nashville	February 17	
3	Boys of Faith (EP)	Zach Bryan	Warner	September 22	
9	A Cat in the Rain	Turnpike Troubadours	Bossier City/Thirty Tigers	August 25	
2	Equal Strain On All Parts	Jimmy Buffett	Mailboat/Sun	November 3	
2	Gettin' Old	Luke Combs	Columbia Nashville	March 24	
6	Highway Desperado	Jason Aldean	Macon/Broken Bow/BMG	November 3	
1	Higher	Chris Stapleton	Mercury Nashville	November 10	
5	Leather	Cody Johnson	CoJo/Warner Nashville	November 3	
10	Lucky	Megan Moroney	Columbia Nashville	May 5	
1	The Mockingbird & the Crow	Hardy	Big Loud	January 20	
5	Nate Smith	Nate Smith	Arista Nashville	April 28	
1	One Thing at a Time	Morgan Wallen	Big Loud/Republic/Mercury	March 3	
2	Queen of Me	Shania Twain	Republic	February 3	
3	Religiously. The Album.	Bailey Zimmerman	Warner Nashville	May 12	
1	Rockstar	Dolly Parton	Butterfly/Big Machine	November 17	
4	Rustin' in the Rain	Tyler Childers	Hickman Holler/RCA	September 8	
1	Speak Now (Taylor's Version)	Taylor Swift	Republic	July 7	
8	Tyler Hubbard	Tyler Hubbard	EMI Nashville	January 27	
2	Whitsitt Chapel	Jelly Roll	BBR Music Group	June 2	
1	Zach Bryan	Zach Bryan	Warner	August 25	

=== Other top albums ===
US	Album	Artist	Record label	Release date	Reference
46	29: Written in Stone (Live from Music City)	Carly Pearce	Big Machine	March 24	
39	Across the Sheets	Brett Young	BMLG	August 4	
15	Ain't My Last Rodeo	Riley Green	BMLG	October 13	
27	Blacktop	Corey Kent	RCA Nashville	June 2	
28	Brothers Osborne	Brothers Osborne	EMI Nashville	September 15	
27	Carolyn's Boy	Darius Rucker	Capitol Nashville	October 6	
23	Celebrants	Nickel Creek	Repair/Thirty Tigers	March 24	
11	Come Get Your Wife	Elle King	RCA Nashville	January 27	
38	Damn Love	Kip Moore	MCA Nashville	April 28	
28	The Devil I Know	Ashley McBryde	Warner Nashville	September 8	
14	Gravel & Gold	Dierks Bentley	Capitol Nashville	February 24	
34	Greatest Hits	Willie Nelson	Legacy	November 3	
15	The Hunger Games: The Ballad of Songbirds & Snakes (soundtrack)	Various artists	Lionsgate/Geffen/IGA	November 17	
36	I Hate Cowboys & All Dogs Go to Hell	Chase Rice	Broken Bow	February 10	
37	I'll Be a Bartender (EP)	Dylan Scott	Curb	October 6	
47	Killed the Cowboy	Dustin Lynch	BBR Music Group	September 29	
17	Little Songs	Colter Wall	La Honda/RCA	July 14	
13	Memory Lane	Old Dominion	Three Up Three Down/Columbia Nashville	June 23 (EP); October 6 (album)	
40	Million Eyes	Sam Barber	Atlantic/Lockeland Springs	September 22	
43	The Monument Singles Collection: 1964-1968	Dolly Parton	Monument/Legacy	April 21	
12	Never Enough	Parker McCollum	MCA Nashville	May 12	
39	No Better Time	Dylan Gossett	Mercury/Republic	October 27	
25	Not That Fancy	Reba McEntire	MCA Nashville	October 6	
12	Pretty Little Poison	Warren Zeiders	Warner Nashville	August 18	
45	Psychopath	Morgan Wade	Ladylike/RCA Nashville	August 25	
11	Rolling Up the Welcome Mat (EP)	Kelsea Ballerini	Black River	February 10	
17	Standing Room Only	Tim McGraw	Big Machine	August 25	
25	Stray Dog	Justin Moore	Valory	May 5	
30	Strays	Margo Price	Loma Vista	January 13	
45	A Tribute to The Judds	Various artists	Broken Bow/BMG	October 27	

== Hall of Fame inductees ==
=== Country Music Hall of Fame ===
(announced on April 3, 2023)

- Bob McDill
- Patty Loveless
- Tanya Tucker

=== Canadian Country Music Hall of Fame ===
(announced on July 18, 2023)

- Jason McCoy
- Brian Edwards

=== International Bluegrass Music Hall of Fame ===
(announced on July 19, 2023)

- Sam Bush
- Wilma Lee Cooper
- David Grisman

=== Nashville Songwriters Hall of Fame ===
(announced on August 3, 2023)

- Casey Beathard
- Kix Brooks
- Rafe Van Hoy
- David Lee Murphy
- Keith Urban

== Deaths ==
- January 4 – Stan Hitchcock, 86, singer-songwriter and co-founder of CMT
- January 5 – Mark Capps, 54, sound engineer, record producer and son of musician Jimmy Capps (shot by SWAT team)
- January 8 – Slim Newton, 90, Australian country music singer-songwriter (The Redback on the Toilet Seat)
- January 9 – Dick Flood, 90, singer-songwriter and naturalist
- January 12 – Lisa Marie Presley, 54, singer-songwriter and only child of Elvis Presley.
- January 26 – Peter McCann, 74, singer-songwriter ("Nobody Falls Like a Fool", "She's Single Again")
- January 30 – Pat Bunch, 83, songwriter ("I'll Still Be Loving You", "Safe in the Arms of Love", "Wild One")
- February 8 – Burt Bacharach, 94, pianist-composer ("The Story of My Life" and "Any Day Now" on the country charts)
- February 17 – Kyle Jacobs, 49, songwriter ("More Than a Memory") and husband of Kellie Pickler
- March 4 – Michael Rhodes, 69, session bass guitarist
- March 26 – Ray Pillow, 85, veteran Grand Ole Opry member ("I'll Take the Dog")
- April 23 – Keith Gattis, 52, singer-songwriter, guitarist, and producer
- April 28 – Claude Gray, 91, American singer-songwriter ("Family Bible)".
- May 1 – Gordon Lightfoot, 84, Canadian singer-songwriter ("If You Could Read My Mind", "Sundown", "The Wreck of the Edmund Fitzgerald")
- May 16 – Richard Landis, 77, American record producer, songwriter, and record executive
- May 25 – Joy McKean, 93, singer-songwriter and manager known as the "Queen of Australian country music", notable for penning the hit "Lights on the Hill", and her work with her husband Slim Dusty and daughter Anne Kirkpatrick.
- June 23 – Jesse McReynolds, 93, innovative bluegrass singer and mandolinist and the oldest living member of the Grand Ole Opry.
- June 27 – Bobby Osborne, 91, American bluegrass singer, co-founder of the Osborne Brothers and a member of the Grand Ole Opry. (Rocky Top).
- July 17 – Jerry Bradley, 83, music executive and producer
- August 11 – Shoji Tabuchi, 79, Japanese-American fiddler, cancer.
- August 18 – Vernon Oxford, 81, American country music singer.
- September 1 – Jimmy Buffett, 76, American singer-songwriter ("Come Monday", "Margaritaville", "Cheeseburger in Paradise"), Merkel-cell carcinoma
- September 10 – Charlie Robison, 59, singer-songwriter, cardiac arrest.
- September 18 – Bob Corbin, 72, songwriter ("Can't Keep a Good Man Down") and former member of Corbin/Hanner
- September 22 –
  - Mike Henderson, 70, singer-songwriter and guitarist known for his work with Chris Stapleton and the SteelDrivers
  - Rick Russell, 53, lead singer of Smokin' Armadillos
- October 9 – Buck Trent, 85, American country music instrumentalist.
- October 23 – Mervin Shiner, 102, American country singer ("Why Don't You Haul Off and Love Me"), songwriter and guitarist.
- October 28 – Bill Rice, 84, American country music singer and songwriter.
- December 7 – Terry Baucom, 71, American bluegrass singer and banjo player (Russell Moore and IIIrd Tyme Out), complications from Alzheimer's disease.
- December 22 – Laura Lynch, 65, American country music singer and musician & founding member of the Dixie Chicks, car crash.

== Major awards ==
=== Academy of Country Music Awards ===
(presented on May 16, 2024)

- Entertainer of the Year – Lainey Wilson
- Male Artist of the Year – Chris Stapleton
- Female Artist of the Year – Lainey Wilson
- Group of the Year – Old Dominion
- Duo of the Year – Dan + Shay
- New Male Artist of the Year – Nate Smith
- New Female Artist of the Year – Megan Moroney
- New Duo/Group of the Year - Tigirlily Gold
- Songwriter of the Year – Jessie Jo Dillon
- Artist-Songwriter of the Year – Hardy
- Single of the Year – "Fast Car" (Luke Combs)
- Song of the Year – "Next Thing You Know" (Jordan Davis, Chase McGill, Jordan Reynolds, Josh Osborne)
- Album of the Year – Higher (Chris Stapleton)
- Musical Event of the Year – "Save Me" (Jelly Roll & Lainey Wilson)
- Visual Media of the Year – "Burn It Down" (Parker McCollum)

=== Canadian Country Music Association Awards ===
(presented on September 16, 2023)

- Entertainer of the Year - Jade Eagleson
- Fans' Choice - James Barker Band
- Album of the Year - Tim and the Glory Boys (Tim and the Glory Boys)
- Alternative Country Album of the Year - A Traveler's Lament (Kyle McKearney)
- Male Artist of the Year - Jade Eagleson
- Female Artist of the Year - Tenille Townes
- Group or Duo of the Year - James Barker Band
- Breakthrough Artist or Group of the Year - Josh Ross
- Single of the Year - "Right on Time" (Lindsay Ell)
- Songwriter of the Year - "The Thing That Wrecks You" (Bryan Adams, Daniel Tashian, Kate York, Tenille Townes)
- Musical Collaboration of the Year - "Do This Life" (High Valley and Alison Krauss) and "One Too" (Dallas Smith and MacKenzie Porter)
- Video of the Year - "Float" (Tim and the Glory Boys)
- Top Selling Canadian Album of the Year - Good Ol' Days (The Reklaws)
- Top Selling Canadian Single of the Year - "Dear Alcohol" (Dax)
- Producer of the Year - Danick Dupelle
- Guitar Player of the Year - Brennan Wall
- Bass Player of the Year - Justin Kudding
- Drummer of the Year - Rich DaSilva
- Fiddle Player of the Year - Julie Kennedy
- Steel Guitar Player of the Year - Doug Johnson
- Keyboard Player of the Year - Brendan Waters
- Specialty Instrument Player of the Year - Mitch Jay
- Top Selling International Album - One Thing at a Time (Morgan Wallen)

=== CMT Music Awards ===
(presented on April 2, 2023)

- Video of the Year: "Thank God" (Kane Brown and Katelyn Brown)
- Male Video of the Year: "Son of a Sinner" (Jelly Roll)
- Female Video of the Year: "Heart Like a Truck" (Lainey Wilson)
- Duo/Group Video of the Year: "Out in the Middle" (Zac Brown Band)
- Collaborative Video of the Year: "Wait in the Truck" (Hardy featuring Lainey Wilson)
- Male Breakthrough Video of the Year: "Son of a Sinner" (Jelly Roll)
- Female Breakthrough Video of the Year: "Tennessee Orange" (Megan Moroney)
- CMT Performance of the Year: "'Til You Can't" (Cody Johnson)
- CMT Digital-First Performance of the Year: "Son of a Sinner" (Jelly Roll)
- Equal Play Award: Shania Twain

=== Grammy Awards ===
(presented on February 4, 2024)

- Best Country Solo Performance – "White Horse" (Chris Stapleton)
- Best Country Duo/Group Performance – "I Remember Everything" (Zach Bryan featuring Kacey Musgraves)
- Best Country Song – "White Horse" (Chris Stapleton and Dan Wilson)
- Best Country Album – Bell Bottom Country (Lainey Wilson)
- Best Bluegrass Album – City of Gold (Molly Tuttle & Golden Highway)
- Best Americana Album – Weathervanes (Jason Isbell and the 400 Unit)
- Best American Roots Performance – "Eve was Black" (Allison Russell)
- Best Americana Performance – "Dear Insecurity" (Brandy Clark featuring Brandi Carlile)
- Best American Roots Song – "Cast Iron Skillet" (Jason Isbell)

=== Juno Awards ===
(presented on March 24, 2023)

- Country Album of the Year - Ahead of Our Time (James Barker Band)

=== Hollywood walk of Fame ===
Stars who were honored in 2023

Darius Rucker and Blake Shelton
