= Something's Gonna Kill Me =

2023 single by Corey Kent

Single by Corey Kent

from the album Blacktop
- Released: July 10, 2023
- Genre: Country
- Length: 3:03
- Label: RCA Nashville
- Songwriters: Corey Kent; Austin Goodloe; Joybeth Taylor; Lydia Vaughan
- Producer: Jay Joyce

Corey Kent singles chronology
"Wild as Her" (2022)	"Something's Gonna Kill Me" (2023)	"This Heart" (2024)

Music video
- "Something's Gonna Kill Me" on YouTube

"Something's Gonna Kill Me" is a song by American country music singer Corey Kent. It was sent to country radio on July 10, 2023 as the second single from his third studio album Blacktop (2023). It was written by Kent himself, Austin Goodloe, Joybeth Taylor and Lydia Vaughan and produced by Jay Joyce.

== Background ==
The song was inspired by Corey Kent's penchant for risky activities, notably riding motorcycles, and his response to people who advised him to live more cautiously, which he summarized with the line "Get busy living or get busy dying", from the film The Shawshank Redemption. Kent brought up the topic during a creative retreat in the Dallas area in October 2022, where it was one of six songs he wrote with Austin Goodloe, Joybeth Taylor and Lydia Vaughan. As the songwriters explored ways to express this sentiment, Kent came up with "Something's gonna kill me at some point, so I might as well enjoy it." The writers used the first part of that line as a title and the setup for the chorus, before finding a last line that would rhyme with "One day I'm gonna die". They initially wrote it as a breakup song, using the line "might as well be this heart of mine", but eventually settled with "Might as well be what makes me feel alive".

Goodloe finished the demo in Nashville, Tennessee. The song was further polished during Kent's session with Jay Joyce. Guitarists Charlie Worsham and Rob McNelley developed a more elaborate introduction, with Worsham also adding melodies. Joyce added distinctive percussive elements and effects over the drumbeat, and signaled the guitar solo to build upward before spontaneously dropping out to expose Kent's vocal for the final chorus. The song was selected as the next single and released to country radio via PlayMPE on July 5, 2023.

== Composition ==
"Something's Gonna Kill Me" is a rock-infused country song, with acoustic and electric guitars and four on the floor drumbeat. Lyrically, Corey Kent focuses on his preference for living a life that brings enjoyment rather than longevity. He lists off a number of potentially dangerous pursuits that he finds pleasure in, such as his on-the-road lifestyle, drinking whiskey and smoking, and highlights his refusal to live in fear of the consequences.

== Charts ==
Chart performance for "Something's Gonna Kill Me"
Chart (2023)	Peak position
US Bubbling Under Hot 100 (Billboard)	14
US Country Airplay (Billboard)	40
US Hot Country Songs (Billboard)	31

== Certifications ==
Region	Certification	Certified units/sales
Canada (Music Canada)	Gold	40,000^{‡}
United States (RIAA)	Platinum	1,000,000^{‡}
^{‡} Sales+streaming figures based on certification alone.
