= Rocky Mountain Low =

2025 single by Corey Kent featuring Koe Wetzel

Single by Corey Kent featuring Koe Wetzel

from the album Heartland Rock and Roll
- Released: December 5, 2025
- Recorded: 2025
- Genre: Country rock
- Length: 2:48
- Label: RCA Nashville
- Songwriters: Corey Kent; Thomas Archer; Austin Goodloe; Michael Tyler
- Producer: Austin Goodloe

Corey Kent singles chronology
"This Heart" (2024)	"Rocky Mountain Low" (2025)	"Empty Words" (2026)

Koe Wetzel singles chronology
"Werewolf" (2025)	"Rocky Mountain Low" (2025)	"Time Goes On" (2026)

Music video
- "Rocky Mountain Low" on YouTube

"Rocky Mountain Low" is a single by American country music singer Corey Kent featuring American singer Koe Wetzel It was released on December 5, 2025 as the lead single from Kent's third studio album, Heartland Rock and Roll. It was written by Kent himself, Thomas Archer, Austin Goodloe and Michael Tyler and produced by Goodloe.

== Background ==
Corey Kent conceived the song's title during a trip to Crested Butte, Colorado with his wife. While riding a ski lift to the top of a mountain, they observed the scenery, along with a rainbow, which inspired the words "Rocky Mountain Low". Kent subsequently created the song during a writing session on January 5, 2025, with Austin Goodloe and Michael Tyler in Goodloe's attic office. Goodloe had developed a "pulsing, midtempo groove" with a 1950 Kay N-5 Parlor guitar, which Kent paired with his song idea. They built the song around Goodloe's guitar foundation and worked through a demo on the same day.

The studio band played to the Kay-based riff when they laid the instrumental tracks at the Sound Emporium Studios in Nashville, Tennessee. Drummer Aaron Sterling felt as if he could not play the song any better than the demo, and the musicians decided to take creative chances. Additional guitar sounds were added, while the bass was played louder as the song progressed. As production evolved, Kent asked Koe Wetzel to sing the second verse and they recorded his vocal in Cisco, Texas. Kent thought the song might not be chosen as a single, as he perceived it to fall outside the mainstream, but considered it a suitable introduction to his next album. RCA Nashville approved it and released the song to country radio on December 5, 2025.

== Composition ==
"Rocky Mountain Low" is a country rock song, which Corey Kent described as a blend of his influences in both genres. It consists of acoustic, electric and bass guitar and drums. Lyrically, the song explores heartbreak as the protagonist realizes his lover is leaving him for another man. He begins with the imagery of a "stack of vinyls" and a reference to Slowhand by Eric Clapton, while in the chorus he hints at smoking to cope with his sorrow and sings about reaching "rocky mountain low", a metaphor for his isolation and emotional coldness. The second verse describes his anger, as he considers kicking down the door of his ex-girlfriend's new partner.

== Critical reception ==
Madeleine O'Connell of Country Now gave a positive review, remarking "The country acts wrestle with frustration, anger, and emotional exhaustion through their gritty, musty tones that blend together perfectly." She added, "The best part of the mid-tempo track in Kent's eyes is its unique sound. It offers an electric-guitar-driven arrangement that gives the song a simmering intensity to match the raw lyrics. Melodically, it moves like a slow burn and also features a heavy emotional undertone that keeps things mellow and undeniably powerful at the same time." Erica Zisman of Country Swag wrote, "'Rocky Mountain Low' embodies this innovative new sound embodies that blends gritty rock energy with Kent’s signature country style. Wetzel's voice adds another incredible layer to the track – a perfect collaboration overall. The song feels like it could be played on rock or country radio, while captivating audiences across genres. 'Rocky Mountain Low' is an instant ear worm. The song pulls you in from the first line, so we're sure fans are going to be listening again and again!"

== Charts ==
Chart performance for "Rocky Mountain Low"
Chart (2026)	Peak position
Canada Country (Billboard)	20
New Zealand Hot Singles (RMNZ)	14
US Billboard Hot 100	78
US Country Airplay (Billboard)	4
US Hot Country Songs (Billboard)	18
