= Westward (album) =

Studio album by Dylan Gossett
- Released: July 18, 2025
- Genre: Texas country; Americana; Red dirt; Folk rock
- Length: 60:01
- Label: Big Loud Texas; Mercury
- Producer: Dylan Gossett

Dylan Gossett chronology
Songs in the Gravel (2024)	Westward (2025)

Singles from Westward
- 1. "Coal" Released: July 27, 2023; 2. "Tree Birds" Released: October 11, 2024; 3. "Like I Do" Released: March 14, 2025; 4. "American Trail" Released: May 2, 2025; 5. "Sweet Lady" Released: June 6, 2025

Westward is the debut studio album by American country artist Dylan Gossett. The album was released on July 18, 2025, via Big Loud Texas and Mercury Records. Gossett produced the album himself and co-wrote all seventeen tracks. It was preceded by his breakout hit "Coal", and other singles "Tree Birds", "Like I Do", "American Trail", and "Sweet Lady". Thematically, the project explores themes of love, family, faith, and chasing one's dreams.

== Background ==
Gossett began releasing music in June 2023, and gained popularity when performances of his song "Coal" began circulating on TikTok. In response to this, Gossett recorded and released a full version of the song on July 27, 2023 which became his commercial breakthrough and charted in the US, UK, Canada, and Ireland. Gossett subsequently left his job to focus on music full-time, eventually releasing his debut extended play, No Better Time, on October 27, 2023 and his second, Songs in the Gravel, on March 22, 2024.

"Tree Birds" was released on October 11, 2024 and was reported as being the first single from Gossett's upcoming debut studio album. Discussing the track, which had been a staple of Gossett's live set for some time prior to release, Gossett stated "It has a lot of Texas Country roots. I went in and tracked it with the band to try to capture the energy of the live performances".

This was followed by "Like I Do" on March 11, 2025. The album and its title were officially announced on May 2, 2024 alongside the release of "American Trail". In a statement accompanying the announcement, Gossett explained “this album is a collection of stories that I wrote during the craziest two years of my life. I hope everyone can find something for themselves in it”. "Sweet Lady" was later released on June 6, 2025 as the final pre-release track from the project.

== Track listing ==
All tracks are written by Dylan Gossett, except where noted.

Westward track listing
No.	Title	Writer(s)	Length
1.	"Lord Will You Carry Me"		1:29
2.	"Hangin' On"		3:40
3.	"Cicada Choir"		3:04
4.	"American Trail"	Dylan Gossett; Colton Forrest Hardy	4:15
5.	"Snake Eyes"		3:58
6.	"Livin' the Dream"		2:42
7.	"Sweet Lady"		2:59
8.	"Adeline (You're Outta Line)"	Gossett; Hardy	3:57
9.	"Roll of 35"		3:28
10.	"Like I Do"	Gossett; Hardy	4:17
11.	"Tired of Running"		4:30
12.	"Smell of Rain"		2:04
13.	"Back 40"		4:19
14.	"Tree Birds"		3:32
15.	"Song About You"	Gossett; Hardy	5:10
16.	"Coal"		3:14
17.	"Baptized By Rain"		4:41
Total length:			60:01

== Charts ==
Chart performance for Westward
Chart (2025)	Peak position
Scottish Albums (OCC)	88
UK Americana Albums (OCC)	10
UK Country Albums (OCC)	2
US Top Country Albums (Billboard)	24
