= Only a Woman =

Only a Woman may refer to:

- Only a Woman (1941 film), Swedish film
- Only a Woman (1962 film), German film
- "Only a Woman" (song) by Matt Lang
