= 2023 Canadian Country Music Awards =

Music awards in Canada

- Date: September 16, 2023
- Venue: FirstOntario Centre; Hamilton, Ontario
- Hosted by: The Reklaws

Highlights
- Most awards: Jade Eagleson; Tenille Townes; (3 each)

Television/radio coverage
- Network: CTV

The 2023 Canadian Country Music Awards, honouring achievements in Canadian country music, were presented on September 16, 2023, at the FirstOntario Centre in Hamilton, Ontario. For the first time in 25 years they were broadcast by CTV instead of Global, under a new content partnership with Bell Media which included a listener contest on the Pure Country radio network to win tickets to attend the event.

The ceremony was hosted by country duo The Reklaws. Performers included Sam Hunt, Jade Eagleson, James Barker Band, Dean Brody, Carly Pearce, Josh Ross, Dallas Smith, Train and Tenille Townes.

Nominees were announced on July 13. Jade Eagleson and Tenille Townes tied for the most awards, with each artist winning three.

== Nominees and winners ==
=== Music ===
Entertainer of the Year	Album of the Year
Jade Eagleson; Dean Brody; Dallas Smith; Tenille Townes; Shania Twain	Tim & the Glory Boys, Tim & The Glory Boys; Shawn Austin, Planes Don't Wait; Tim Hicks, Talk to Time; Andrew Hyatt, Four Good Years; The Reklaws, Good Ol’ Days
Male Artist of the Year	Female Artist of the Year
Jade Eagleson; Dean Brody; Brett Kissel; Josh Ross; Dallas Smith	Tenille Townes; Tenille Arts; Lindsay Ell; MacKenzie Porter; Shania Twain
Group or Duo of the Year	Musical Collaboration of the Year
James Barker Band; High Valley; Hunter Brothers; The Reklaws; Tim & the Glory Boys	High Valley with Alison Krauss, "Do This Life"; The Reklaws feat. Jake Owen, "11 Beers"; Gord Bamford feat. Terri Clark, "I Ain't Drunk"; Tyler Joe Miller and Matt Lang, "Never Met a Beer"; Dallas Smith and MacKenzie Porter, "One Too"
Breakthrough Artist or Group of the Year	Fans' Choice
Josh Ross; Dax; Nate Haller; Griffen Palmer; Orville Peck	James Barker Band; Dean Brody; Jade Eagleson; Tim Hicks; High Valley; Brett Kissel; The Reklaws; Josh Ross; Dallas Smith; Tenille Townes
Alternative Country Album of the Year	Single of the Year
Kyle McKearney, A Traveler's Lament; Jason Benoit, Time Traveller; The Bros. Landreth, Come Morning; Mallory Johnson, Surprise Party; Whitehorse, I'm Not Crying, You’re Crying	Lindsay Ell, "Right on Time"; Dean Brody, "Where'd You Learn How to Do That"; James Barker Band, "Wastin' Whiskey"; Tyler Joe Miller, "Wild As Her"; The Reklaws feat. Jake Owen, "11 Beers"; Josh Ross, "On a Different Night"
Songwriter of the Year	Video of the Year
Bryan Adams, Daniel Tashian, Tenille Townes, Kate York — Tenille Townes feat. Bryan Adams, "The Thing That Wrecks You"; Kelly Archer, Danick Dupelle, Tyler Joe Miller — Tyler Joe Miller, "Back to Drinkin' Whiskey"; Rodney Clawson, Tim Neufeld, Allen Salmon — Tim & the Glory Boys, "Float"; Trannie Anderson, Matt McGinn, Jake Mitchell, Meghan Patrick — Meghan Patrick, "Greatest Show on Dirt"; Josh Ross, Mason Thornley — Josh Ross, "Trouble"	Tim & the Glory Boys, "Float"; Dallas Smith and MacKenzie Porter, "One Too"; Jade Eagleson, "She Don't Know"; Tenille Townes feat. Bryan Adams, "The Thing That Wrecks You"; Josh Ross, "Trouble"
Top Selling Canadian Album of the Year	Top Selling Canadian Single of the Year
The Reklaws, Good Ol' Days	Dax, "Dear Alcohol"
Guitar Player of the Year	Bass Player of the Year
Brennan Wall; Jeff Brown; Ryan Davidson; Johnny Gasparic; Chad Murphy	Justin Kudding; Lisa Dodd Watts; Lisa Jacobs; Mark Rynkun; Holt Stuart Hitchcox
Steel Guitar Player of the Year	Drummer of the Year
Doug Johnson; Chris Altmann; Michael Eckert; Marcus Ramsay	Rich DaSilva; Matthew Atkins; Flavio Cirillo; Brendan Lyons; Greg Williamson
Fiddle Player of the Year	Keyboard Player of the Year
Julie Kennedy; Tyler Beckett; Denis Dufresne; Ben Rutz; Mike Sanyshyn	Brendan Waters; Matt Koebel; Brendon Schmidt; Scott Wilkinson
Specialty Instrument Player of the Year	Top Selling International Album
Mitch Jay; Johnny Gasparic; Shane Guse	Morgan Wallen, One Thing at a Time

=== Radio ===
Radio Station of the Year, Large Market	Radio Station of the Year, Medium/Small Market
CJJR-FM — Vancouver, British Columbia; CFCW — Calgary, Alberta; CHKX-FM — Hamilton, Ontario; CKDX-FM — London, Ontario; CKKL-FM — Ottawa, Ontario	CHCQ-FM — Belleville, Ontario; CJXL-FM — Moncton, New Brunswick; CKGY-FM — Red Deer, Alberta; CKLJ-FM — Olds, Alberta; CKXC-FM — Kingston, Ontario
Radio Personality of the Year
Wendy Boomer, CKBY-FM; Shannon Ella, Pure Country; Paul McGuire, Stingray Radio; Greg Shannon and Stella Stevens, CFCW; Toff & Melissa, CHKX-FM

=== Industry ===
Booking Agency of the Year	Country Club of the Year
Sakamoto Agency; Action Entertainment Collaborative; The Feldman Agency; Invictus Entertainment Group; Paquin Artists Agency	The King Eddy — Calgary, Alberta; Cook County Saloon — Edmonton, Alberta; Ranchman's Cookhouse and Dancehall — Calgary, Alberta; Rock ‘N’ Horse Saloon — Toronto, Ontario
Country Festival, Fair or Exhibition of the Year	Country Music Program or Special of the year
Boots and Hearts Music Festival — Oro-Medonte, Ontario; Big Valley Jamboree — Camrose, Alberta; Calgary Stampede — Calgary, Alberta; Cavendish Beach Music Festival — Cavendish, Prince Edward Island; LASSO Montreal — Montreal, Quebec	Christmas Time with Tenille Townes 2022 (Sony Music Entertainment); Boomer's Canadian Club (Rogers Media); Canada’s Country Radio (Apple Music); The Road Less Travelled (Stingray Radio); A Washboard Union Christmas Special (syndicated)
Management Company of the Year	Music Publishing Company of the Year
The Core Entertainment; Big Loud Management; MDM Artist Management Services; Simkin Artist Management; Starseed Entertainment	Big Loud Publishing; Anthem Entertainment Group; Sony Music Publishing; Universal Music Publishing; Warner Chappell Music Canada
Record Company of the Year	Industry Person of the Year
Big Loud Records; MDM Recordings Inc.; Sony Music Entertainment (Canada) Inc.; Universal Music Canada; Warner Music Canada	Warren Copnick (Sony Music Entertainment (Canada) Inc); Paul Biro (Sakamoto Agency); Mike Denney (MDM Recordings Inc.); Brianne Deslippe (Big Loud Records); Amanda Kingsland (Universal Music Canada)
Creative Team or Director of the Year	Recording Studio of the Year
Austin Chaffe; Devin Cooper, Chad Murphy; Chris Doi, Roberta Landreth, Kyle McKearney, Jeff Ojeda; Brandon Ferguson, Lloyd Norman; Mitchell Nevins	MCC Recording Studio — Calgary, Alberta; Barrytone Studios — Miramichi, New Brunswick; Bart McKay Productions — Saskatoon, Saskatchewan; OCL Studios — Chestermere, Alberta; Revolution Recording — Toronto, Ontario
Record Producer of the Year	Retailer of the Year
Danick Dupelle — Tyler Joe Miller, "Back to Drinkin' Whiskey", "Never Met a Beer"; Russell Broom, Kyle McKearney — Kyle McKearney, A Traveler's Lament; Scott Cooke — Andrew Hyatt, Four Good Years; Jeff Coplan, Deric Ruttan — Tim Hicks, Talk to Time; Joey Moi — Dallas Smith and MacKenzie Porter, "One Too"	Spotify; Apple Music; Amazon Music
Talent Buyer or Promoter of the Year	Video Director of the Year
Brooke Dunford (Republic Live); Paul Biro (Sakamoto Agency); Dan Clapson (Blue Jay Sessions); Jim Cressman (Invictus Entertainment Group); Adam Oppenheim (Stampede Entertainment)	Travis Nesbitt; AJ Astle; Ben Knechtel; Ryan Nolan; OUDi (Crystal Leigh)
Innovative Campaign of the Year	Gary Slaight Music Humanitarian Award
“She Don't Know” Wedding Contest — Jade Eagleson; “Let ‘Em Lie” Release Highlights — Kyle McKearney, Don Amero; Mastering of “Master of Puppets” — Hailey Benedict; “Surprise Party” Album Release — Mallory Johnson; “What Colour You Drive” Content and Fan Contest — Hunter Brothers	Dean Brody — The Dean Brody Foundation

== See also ==
- 2023 in Canadian music
- 2023 in country music
