= Spillin' My Truth =

2023 studio album by Tyler Joe Miller

Studio album by Tyler Joe Miller
- Released: August 25, 2023
- Genre: Country
- Length: 35:27
- Label: MDM
- Producer: Danick Dupelle

Tyler Joe Miller chronology
The Band's Packed Up (2023)	Spillin' My Truth (2023)	Going Home (2024)

Singles from Spillin' My Truth
- 1. "Wild as Her" Released: February 11, 2022; 2. "Never Met a Beer" Released: August 5, 2022; 3. "Back to Drinkin' Whiskey" Released: February 3, 2023; 4. "Shoulda Known Better" Released: June 23, 2023

Spillin' My Truth is the debut full-length studio album by Canadian country music artist Tyler Joe Miller. It was released on August 25, 2023, via MDM Recordings. The album was produced by Danick Dupelle, and contains the singles "Wild as Her", "Never Met a Beer", "Back to Drinkin' Whiskey", and "Shoulda Known Better". The three tracks from Miller's 2023 acoustic extended play The Band's Packed Up are included as bonus tracks at the end of the album.

== Background ==
Miller described Spillin' My Truth as "an album full of stories which in whole tells one big one," adding that it demonstrated "the ups and downs of life that bring you to where you’re meant to be". Some of the songs on the album were recorded one or two years prior to its release, to which Miller remarked that it was "so nice to finally get more music out". He described the song "Better Than Nothing at All" featuring fellow Canadian country singer Carolyn Dawn Johnson as the "focus track" on the album.

== Critical reception ==
Dan Savoie of 519 Magazine stated that Miller's "rootsy authenticity reflects in his songs".

== Track listing ==
No.	Title	Writer(s)	Length
1.	"Shoulda Known Better"	Tyler Joe Miller; Jeff Johnson; Dan Swinimer	2:46
2.	"That's Her"	Miller; Erik Dylan; Mitch Merrett	2:44
3.	"Back to Drinkin' Whiskey"	Miller; Kelly Archer; Danick Dupelle	2:54
4.	"Backward Sense"	Miller; Archer; Merrett	3:07
5.	"Never Met a Beer" (with Matt Lang)	Dupelle; Tebey Ottoh; Jimmy Thow	2:52
6.	"Let Her Get Away"	Miller; Dupelle; Thow	3:06
7.	"Wild as Her"	Archer; Brett Tyler; Morgan Wallen	3:01
8.	"Better Than Nothing at All" (featuring Carolyn Dawn Johnson)	Miller; Merrett; Brian White	3:42
9.	"I Know Jack"	Miller	3:52
10.	"Closing Time"	Miller; Joel Hutsell	3:39
11.	"Hero to Me"	Miller; Jared Hampton; Vinnie Paolizzi	3:39

== Charts ==
=== Singles ===
Chart performance for singles from Spillin' My Truth
Year	Single	Peak positions		Certifications
Year	Single	CAN Country	CAN	Certifications
2022	"Wild as Her"	8	94	MC: Gold
2022	"Never Met a Beer" (with Matt Lang)	10	—	
2023	"Back to Drinkin' Whiskey"	9	—	
2023	"Shoulda Known Better"	11	—	

== Awards and nominations ==
Year	Association	Category	Nominated work	Result	Ref
2023	Canadian Country Music Association	Musical Collaboration of the Year	"Never Met a Beer" (with Matt Lang)	Nominated	
2023	Canadian Country Music Association	Single of the Year	"Wild as Her"	Nominated	
2023	Canadian Country Music Association	Songwriter(s) of the Year	"Back to Drinkin' Whiskey" (with Kelly Archer, Danick Dupelle)	Nominated	
2023	Canadian Country Music Association	Video of the Year	"Back to Drinkin' Whiskey"	Nominated	
2024	Juno Awards	Country Album of the Year	Spillin' My Truth	Nominated	
2024	Canadian Country Music Association	Album of the Year	Spillin' My Truth	Nominated	

== Release history ==
Release formats for Spillin' My Truth
Country	Date	Format	Label	Ref.
Various	August 25, 2023	Digital download	MDM Recordings Inc.	
Various	August 25, 2023	Streaming	MDM Recordings Inc.	
