= Should've Known Better =

Should've Known Better or similar may refer to:

- "Should've Known Better" (Richard Marx song), 1987
- "Shoulda Known Better" (song) by Tyler Joe Miller, 2023
- "Should Have Known Better", 2015 song by Sufjan Stevens
- "I Should Have Known Better", by The Beatles, 1964
- "I Should Have Known Better" (Jim Diamond song), 1984
- "Should've Known Better", a song by Soluna Samay, Denmark's entry in the 2012 Eurovision Song Contest
- "Should've Known Better", 2018 song by Clean Bandit from What Is Love?
- "Shoulda Known Better", a song by Janet Jackson from the 2015 album Unbreakable
- "Shoulda Known Better", a 2019 single by MKTO
- "Shoulda Known Better", a song by Unwritten Law from the 2007 album The Hit List
- "Shoulda Known Better", a 2014 song by Honey Mahogany
- "Should Have Known Better", a Ministry song from the 1983 album With Sympathy
- "I Should Have Known Better", a song by Wire on their album 154
- "I Should Have Known Better", a song by Yo La Tengo on their album I Am Not Afraid of You and I Will Beat Your Ass
