= Coal (song) =

Single by Dylan Gossett

from the album Westward
- Released: July 27, 2023
- Genre: Red dirt, Americana
- Length: 3:14
- Label: Big Loud Texas, Mercury
- Songwriter: Dylan Gossett
- Producer: Dylan Gossett

Dylan Gossett singles chronology
"To Be Free" (2023)	"Coal" (2023)	"Beneath Oak Trees" (2023)

"Coal" is a song by American country music artist Dylan Gossett. It was released on July 27, 2023, as the second single from his debut extended play No Better Time. The song was written and produced by Gossett and became his commercial breakthrough after it went viral on TikTok, reaching the top twenty on the Hot Country Songs chart, placing on the Billboard Hot 100, and charting in several international markets. It was later included on his 2025 debut album Westward.

== Background ==
Gossett had not recorded the full version of "Coal" when he first teased it on social media, so after its success on TikTok, he recorded it on a small microphone and a laptop in his bedroom. It was released independently on July 27, 2023, and later reissued when Gossett signed to Big Loud Texas and Mercury Records.

In an interview with Holler, Gossett explained that he wrote the song in 2021 to help him overcome personal struggles, stating "Coal's a very personal song. It's funny because sometimes I'll see comments saying I look like a happy guy - and I am, I'm a goofy, happy dude. But at that point in my life, about two and a half years ago, I just felt like I was stuck in a rut, where nothing was really working. I was just throwing stuff at the wall, and nothing would stick. I started it with the main line, 'If pressure makes diamonds / How the hell am I still coal?' And then the rest of the song came in 20-25 minutes." During the interview, Gossett also declared the song one of his favorites to perform live because of the audience reaction.

== Content ==
"Coal" is an acoustic guitar-driven ballad about a narrator lamenting a failed relationship brought to a end as a result of his alcoholism. In the chorus, he likens himself to coal, and questions how, despite all of the pressure he's been under in his life, he has yet to turn into a diamond.

== Critical reception ==
In an end-of-the-year article covering 2023 in country music, Jon Caramanica of the New York Times dubbed the single "one of the year’s best country songs," while praising Gossett's "ruggedly plaintive voice" and "emotionally detailed" writing.

== Charts ==
Weekly chart performance for "Coal"
Chart (2023–2024)	Peak position
Canada Hot 100 (Billboard)	57
Irish Singles (IRMA)	33
UK Singles (OCC)	55
UK Country Airplay (Radiomonitor)	13
UK Independent Singles (OCC)	14
US Billboard Hot 100	73
US Hot Country Songs (Billboard)	19

== Certifications ==
Certifications for "Coal"
Region	Certification	Certified units/sales
Australia (ARIA)	Gold	35,000^{‡}
United Kingdom (BPI)	Gold	400,000^{‡}
United States (RIAA)	2× Platinum	2,000,000^{‡}
^{‡} Sales+streaming figures based on certification alone.
