= Dylan Gossett =

American singer-songwriter

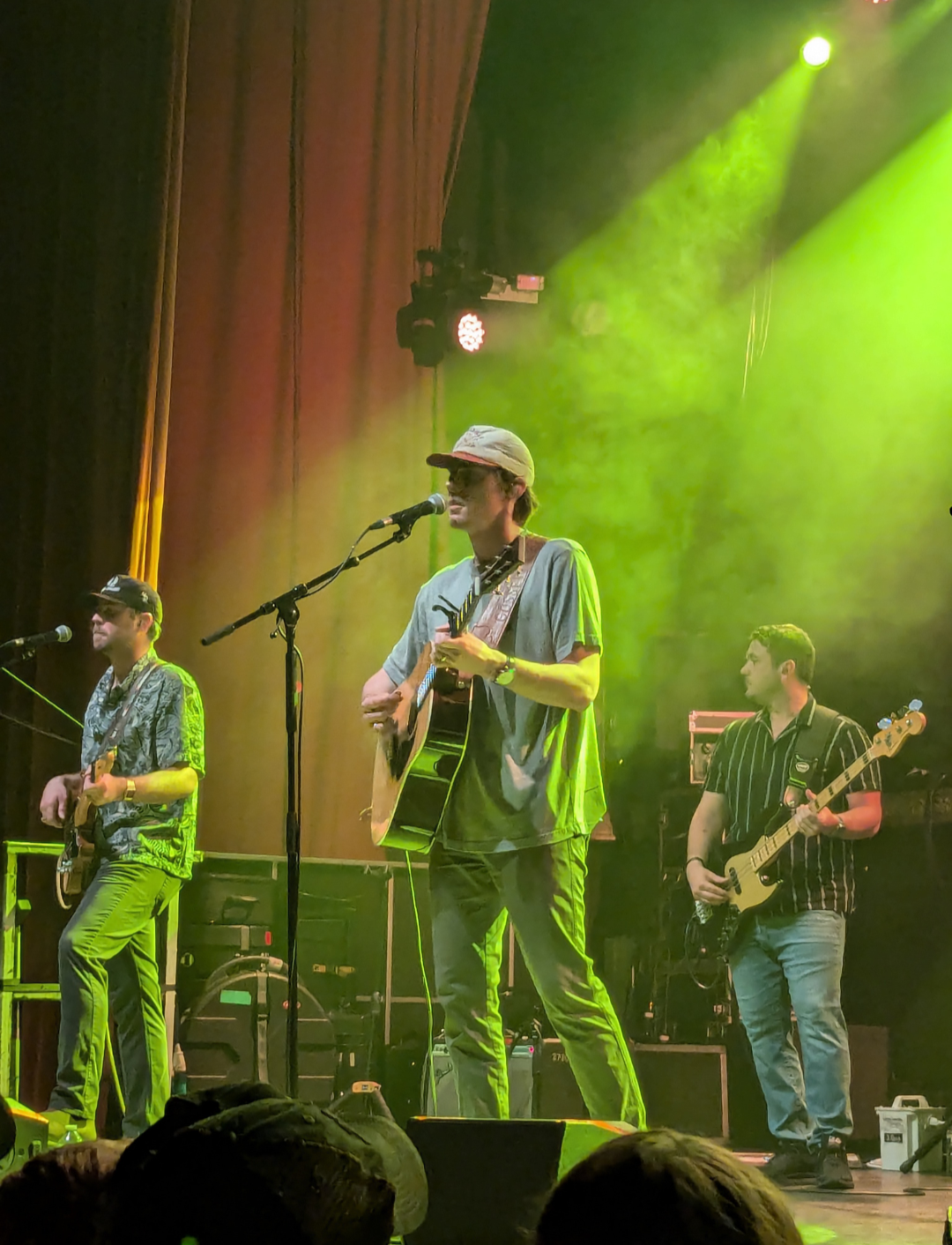
- Gossett performing at O2 Ritz in Manchester, England, June 2024

Background information
- Born: Dylan Gossett; March 11, 1999 (age 27); Austin, Texas, U.S.
- Origin: Austin, Texas, U.S.
- Genres: Country; red dirt; Texas country; Americana
- Occupation: Singer-songwriter
- Instruments: Vocals; guitar
- Years active: 2023–present
- Labels: Big Loud Texas; Mercury Records
- Website: dylangossett.com

Dylan Gossett (born March 11, 1999) is an American country singer-songwriter from Austin, Texas. He has released two studio EPs and two albums. He is signed to Big Loud Texas/Mercury Records and has a global publishing deal with Universal Music Group Nashville. His second self-released single, "Coal", made the Billboard Hot 100. Gossett released his debut album, Westward, on July 18, 2025.

== Early life and education ==
Gossett was born in Austin. His mother worked as a teacher and his father coached basketball. He began taking music lessons in middle school after he discovered Ed Sheeran's music, but eventually stopped them and learned from his brother and from watching YouTube.

Gossett said artists including Sheeran, Turnpike Troubadours, Flatland Cavalry, Cody Johnson, Shane Smith and The Saints, and Mumford & Sons inspire him. Gossett initially only intended to write and perform music for family gatherings during Thanksgiving and Christmas, when he and his family would share ideas and create songs.

Gossett studied at Texas A&M University in College Station, Texas, and graduated in 2021, when he interned with F1 in event operations and logistics at the Circuit of the Americas track in Austin. About two years after Gossett was hired full-time at the racetrack, he began releasing covers of popular songs including "Ophelia" by The Lumineers and "A Life Where We Work Out" by Flatland Cavalry on TikTok. He first released short videos of him performing self-written songs such as his future singles "Coal" and "To Be Free" on TikTok.

== Career ==
=== Social media and early career ===
Gossett released his first single, "To Be Free", on June 20, 2023. Although "To Be Free" wasn't as successful as his next single, the song introduced comparisons between his style and Zach Bryan's. Gossett released videos of him performing the song and his next release, "Coal", on TikTok, where he first gained popularity.

Gossett had not recorded the full version of "Coal" when he first teased it on social media, so after its success on TikTok, he recorded it on a small microphone and a laptop in his bedroom. He wrote "Coal" in 2021 to help him overcome personal struggles; during an interview with Holler Country, Gossett said he "started it with the main line, 'If pressure makes diamonds / How the hell am I still coal?’... then the rest of the song came in 20-25 minutes." "Coal" was released independently on July 27, 2023. The song was Gossett's breakthrough onto the Billboard Hot 100; the U.S. country chart; and the British, Canadian, and Irish single charts. In an end-of-the-year article covering 2023 in country music, Jon Caramanica of the New York Times dubbed the single "one of the year’s best country songs," while praising Gossett's "ruggedly plaintive voice" and "emotionally detailed" writing.

After the success of "Coal", Gossett left his job working at the Circuit of the Americas. On October 6, 2023, he released his third single, "Beneath Oak Trees". He said that the song references the Inspiring Oak Ranch in Wimberley, Texas, where he was married in February 2023, and also is about living every day "as if we're still under the oak trees on our wedding day." Gossett supported Wyatt Flores during his tour in Fall 2023. On October 22, 2023, Gossett performed the national anthem atop the Circuit of the Americas Observation Tower at the 2023 United States Grand Prix near Austin.

On October 27, 2023, Gossett released his debut EP, No Better Time, independently (although it was later released through Big Loud Texas). It includes the title track, "No Better Time", all three previously released singles, and the songs "Flip a Coin" and "Lone Ole Cowboy". He chose "No Better Time" as the title track because, after a discussion with his wife and friends, he realized "there's literally no better time than now to try this music thing." He described "Lone Ole Cowboy" as being inspired by "Big Iron" by Marty Robbins and the music of Canadian singer Colter Wall.

Gossett signed with Big Loud Texas/Mercury Records in November 2023. On December 4, 2023, he and his label announced his "No Better Time" tour to begin in February 2024. He later opened for Noah Kahan during Kahan's Australian leg of the "Stick Season" tour. On February 2, 2024, Gossett released his first single of the year, "Bitter Winds", which was described by Holler Country as "Gossett’s best offering thus far." The same day, it was announced Gossett would be performing at the 2024 Black Deer Festival at Eridge Park in East Sussex, U.K. On February 16, "Coal" was certified gold by the RIAA.

=== "Somewhere Between" tour and Songs in the Gravel ===
On February 23, Gossett announced a new song, "Somewhere Between", only a few weeks after the release of "Bitter Winds". He says "Somewhere Between" is a song about "a guy who lives on a train... a high-energy narrative about a wandering man, running away from his past". It came out on March 1. Also on March 1, Gossett announced his next EP, Songs In The Gravel, and a global publishing deal with Universal Music Group Nashville.

In early March 2024, Gossett announced a continuation of his American "No Better Time" tour with Ole 60 as openers, the European "Somewhere Between" tour, which began in summer 2024. On March 22, 2024, he released his second EP, Songs in the Gravel, to digital download and streaming. It includes his two recently released singles as well as "If I Had a Lover" and "Finally Stop Dreaming". On April 9, 2024, Gossett performed at the Exit/In for the first time in Nashville, where he played the unreleased songs "Back 40" and "Baptized by Rain". On July 17, 2024, Gossett released "Stronger Than A Storm" as a single from the soundtrack album, Twisters: The Album.

=== Westward and Ramblin' ===
On October 11, 2024, Gossett released the first single, "Tree Birds", of his forthcoming debut album, and on March 14, 2025, he released "Like I Do", the second single of the album. He announced his debut album, Westward, on May 2, 2025, coinciding with the release of the album's third single, "American Trail". A fourth single, "Sweet Lady", was released on June 6, 2025, described by Gossett as a love ballad written on the road "about loving where you are in the moment, and promising that we’ll be back home soon." On July 18, 2025, he released Westward, a 17-track debut album, which contained every single released since "Tree Birds", as well as "Coal" and "Back 40". Gossett told Music Row that the entire album was self-written and self-produced. During an interview with Holler Country, Gossett talked about struggles he faces with constantly being on tour and said several of the songs on Westward are written to create balance. The album was his breakthrough on the Billboard 200. It debuting at No. 114, and at No. 24 on the Billboard Top Country Albums.

On August 7, 2026, Gossett announced his second studio album, Ramblin' would be released the following month on September 25. The project was inspired by returning home to Austin, Texas with a new perspective on love, relationships, and home after years of constant touring. It was preceded by the singles "Honeysuckle" and "Loving You Like That".

== Sound and influences ==
When asked to describe his music, Gossett said, “‘singer-songwriter’ I think is the first step. Then there's roots of country, Texas country, folk and Americana”. He lists Mumford & Sons, Ed Sheeran, Shane Smith and The Saints, The Lumineers, Tyler Childers, Marty Robbins, and Colter Wall as being major influences. Gossett's music has been compared to Zach Bryan and Eric Church.

== Discography ==
=== Studio albums ===
Title	Details	Peak chart positions		
Title	Details	US	US Country	UK Country
Westward	Released: July 18, 2025; Label: Big Loud Texas/Mercury; Formats: Digital download, streaming, CD, LP	114	24	2
Ramblin'	Released: September 25, 2026; Label: Big Loud Texas/Mercury; Formats: Digital download, streaming, CD, LP	-	-	-

=== Extended plays ===
Title	Details	Peak chart positions	
Title	Details	US	US Country
No Better Time	Released: October 27, 2023; Label: Independent (later Big Loud Texas/Mercury; Formats: Digital download, streaming, LP	—	34
Songs in the Gravel	Released: March 22, 2024; Label: Big Loud Texas/Mercury; Formats: Digital download, streaming	—	—

=== Singles ===
List of singles, with selected chart positions, showing year released and album name
Title	Year	Peak chart positions					Certifications	Album / EP
Title	Year	US	US Country	UK	CAN	IRE	Certifications	Album / EP
"To Be Free"	2023	—	—	—	—	—		No Better Time
"Coal"	2023	73	19	55	57	33	RIAA: 2× Platinum; ARIA: Gold; BPI: Gold	Westward and No Better Time
"Beneath Oak Trees"	2023	—	—	—	—	—	RIAA: Gold	No Better Time
"Bitter Winds"	2024	—	—	—	—	—		Songs in the Gravel
"Somewhere Between"	2024	—	—	—	—	—		Songs in the Gravel
"Stronger Than a Storm"	2024	—	—	—	—	—		Twisters: The Album
"Tree Birds"	2024	—	—	—	—	—		Westward
"Like I Do"	2025	—	—	—	—	—		Westward
"American Trail"	2025	—	—	—	—	—		Westward
"Sweet Lady"	2025	—	—	—	—	—		Westward
"My Boy"	2026	—	—	—	—	—		Non-album single
"Honeysuckle"	2026	—	—	—	—	—		Ramblin'
"Loving You Like That"	2026	—	—	—	—	—		Ramblin'
"—" denotes a recording that did not chart or was not released in that territory.
