= Empty Words (song) =

2026 single by Corey Kent

Single by Corey Kent

from the album Heartland Rock and Roll
- Released: June 15, 2026
- Genre: Country rock
- Length: 2:32
- Label: RCA Nashville
- Songwriters: Corey Kent; Austin Goodloe; Matt Roy; Joybeth Taylor; Lydia Vaughan
- Producers: Corey Kent; Austin Goodloe

Corey Kent singles chronology
"Rocky Mountain Low" (2025)	"Empty Words" (2026)

"Empty Words" is a song by American country music singer Corey Kent. Originally released as a promotional single in February, it was released to country radio on June 15, 2026, as the second single from his third studio album, Heartland Rock and Roll. Kent co-wrote the song with Austin Goodloe, Matt Roy, Joybeth Taylor, and Lydia Vaughan, and produced it with Goodloe.

== Background ==
Corey Kent said of the song:

As a songwriter, it feels like catching lightning in a bottle when you find that line or double entendre that carries more weight than expected. So "Empty Words" is really special because it says something heavy yet simply. I love that it's already resonating with fans. Based on their insane reaction, we didn't want to make them wait so we've bumped it up in the release schedule to get it to them even sooner.

== Composition ==
"Empty Words" is a country rock song. It finds Corey Kent reflecting on the consequences of not fulfilling his promises in a regretful tone. He conveys that he did not realize the impact of his unkept commitments until it brought about the end of a relationship.

== Charts ==
Chart performance for "Empty Words"
Chart (2026)	Peak position
Canada Hot 100 (Billboard)	68
Canada Country (Billboard)	27
New Zealand Hot Singles (RMNZ)	28
US Billboard Hot 100	43
US Country Airplay (Billboard)	11
US Hot Country Songs (Billboard)	13
