= Corey Kent =

American country singer

- Born: Corey Kent White; Bixby, Oklahoma, U.S.
- Origin: Frisco, Texas, U.S.
- Genres: Country; country rock
- Occupation: Singer
- Instruments: Vocals; guitar
- Years active: 2015–present
- Label: RCA Nashville

Corey Kent White is an American country music singer from Frisco, Texas, who was signed to RCA Nashville.

== Biography ==
Corey Kent White was born in Bixby, Oklahoma. Kent grew up listening to country music, taking influence from artists such as fellow Oklahoma native Garth Brooks. Learning the road life early, Kent was just 11 when he joined a touring Western Swing group, traveling the country at the front of a “working class” band brothers for five years before they finally dissolved. Still in high school and unsure of what came next, he nearly quit entirely – but after a chance encounter of being pulled out of the audience and joining Willie Nelson on stage, he was inspired to start writing songs, a new path emerged. At age 17, he moved to Tennessee, hit the pavement and scored a publishing deal. Then, the bottom dropped out. Kent lost his publishing deal, and decided to move back to Texas prior to the start of the COVID-19 pandemic.

As the world started opening up, Corey began touring in Texas and Oklahoma playing in night clubs and opening for bands like Randy Rogers, Parker McCollum, Kolby Cooper, and Cody Johnson. Corey then emerged on to the Billboard charts in 2022 with "Wild as Her". Due to popularity on streaming services, the song charted in late 2022. The song is a follow-up to Kent's second studio album, 21. Because of this song's initial charting success, Billboard reported that many Nashville labels were in a bidding war to sign Kent. RCA Records Nashville signed Kent in August 2022 and began promoting "Wild as Her" to country radio. "Wild as Her" amassed over 300 million streams in its first year, reached platinum status in March 2023 and reached the top spot at Country Radio in May of the same year.

Kent's major label debut and third studio album, Blacktop, was released on June 2, 2023, via RCA Nashville. "Something's Gonna Kill Me" was released on July 10, 2023, as the second single.

== Discography ==
=== Albums ===
List of albums, with selected chart positions, showing other relevant details
| Title | Album details | Peak chart positions | | |
| Title | Album details | US | US Cou. | US Heat. |
|---|---|---|---|---|
| Long Way | Released: May 27, 2016; Label: Self-released | — | 42 | 19 |
| '21 | Released: December 28, 2021; Label: Self-released | — | — | — |
| Blacktop | Released: June 2, 2023; Label: RCA Nashville | 165 | 27 | 2 |
| Black Bandana | Released: September 6, 2024; Label: RCA Nashville | — | — | 19 |
| Heartland Rock and Roll | Released: September 25, 2026; Label: RCA Nashville | — | — | — |

=== Singles ===
List of singles, with year released and selected chart positions
| Title | Year | Peak chart positions | | | | | | Certifications | Album |
| Title | Year | US | US Country | US Country Airplay | CAN | CAN Country | NZ Hot | Certifications | Album |
|---|---|---|---|---|---|---|---|---|---|
| "Wild as Her" | 2022 | 40 | 12 | 3 | — | 58 | — | RIAA: 3× Platinum; MC: 2× Platinum; RMNZ: Gold | Blacktop |
| "Something's Gonna Kill Me" | 2023 | — (Note: "Something's Gonna Kill Me" did not enter the Billboard Hot 100, but peaked at number 14 on the Bubbling Under Hot 100 chart.) | 31 | 40 | — | — | — | RIAA: Platinum; MC: Gold | Blacktop |
| "This Heart" | 2024 | 82 | 27 | 1 | — | 11 | — | RIAA: Gold; MC: Gold | Black Bandana |
| "Rocky Mountain Low" (featuring Koe Wetzel) | 2025 | 78 | 18 | 4 | — | 20 | 14 | | Heartland Rock and Roll |
| "Empty Words" | 2026 | 43 | 13 | 11 | 68 | 27 | 28 | | Heartland Rock and Roll |

=== Promotional singles ===
List of promotional singles, with the year released, selected chart positions, and the album name
| Title | Year | Peak chart positions | Album |
| Title | Year | US Country | Album |
|---|---|---|---|
| "Gold" | 2020 | — | '21 |
| "Feels a Lot Like This" | 2021 | — | '21 |
| "What It Doesn't Do" | 2021 | — | '21 |
| "Ain't My Day" (featuring Kolby Cooper) | 2021 | — | '21 |
| "Lightning Fast" | 2021 | — | '21 |
| "Now" | 2021 | — | '21 |
| "Hood of That Car" | 2022 | — | Blacktop |
| "How You Know You Made It" | 2022 | — | Blacktop |
| "Man of the House" | 2023 | — | Blacktop |
| "Better Now" | 2023 | — | Non-album single |
| "Rust" | 2024 | — | Black Bandana |
| "Never Ready" | 2024 | — | Black Bandana |
| "Now or Never" (featuring Lauren Alaina) | 2024 | 50 | Black Bandana |
| "Girl I Never Met" | 2025 | — | Poster Child |
| "Measure" (featuring Max McNown) | 2025 | — | Poster Child |
| "Wannabe" | 2026 | — | Heartland Rock and Roll |
| "Cigarette Burns" | 2026 | — | Heartland Rock and Roll |
| "Rather Be Here" (featuring Jason Aldean) | 2026 | — | Heartland Rock and Roll |
