= More (Matt Lang album) =

2020 album by Matt Lang

Studio album by Matt Lang
- Released: June 5, 2020
- Genre: Country
- Length: 24:21
- Label: Jayward Artist Group; The Orchard; Sony Music Canada
- Producer: Danick Dupelle; Tebey

Matt Lang chronology
Matt Lang (2018)	More (2020)	Moonlight Sessions (2023)

Singles from More
- 1. "Water Down the Whiskey" Released: August 23, 2019; 2. "Getcha" Released: May 8, 2020; 3. "Only a Woman" Released: November 6, 2020; 4. "In a Bar" Released: June 4, 2021

More is the debut full-length studio album by Canadian country music artist Matt Lang. It was released on June 5, 2020, via Jayward Music Group. The album was co-produced by Danick Dupelle (of Emerson Drive) and Tebey. It includes the singles "Water Down the Whiskey", "Getcha", "Only a Woman", and "In a Bar".

== Background ==
More is the second English-language project to be released by the Quebec-born Lang, following his 2018 self-titled extended play. In an interview, Lang noted the influence of the Bakersfield sound on his music, and stated that he wanted there to be a traditional country sound to the album. Fellow Canadian country artist and songwriter Tebey co-wrote all of the eight tracks on the album. Lang credited Tebey and his co-producer Danick Dupelle for helping "craft the album".

== Critical reception ==
Hendrik Pape of Sound Check Entertainment opined that the album "has it all," noting the use of "electric guitars along with fiddle and pedal steel and "songs about drinking, love and heartache."

== Track listing ==
More
No.	Title	Writer(s)	Length
1.	"More"	Tebey Ottoh; Kylie Sackley; Matt Rogers	3:02
2.	"Water Down the Whiskey"	Ottoh; Mathieu Langevin; Jay Brunswick; Tommy Cecil	2:40
3.	"In a Bar"	Ottoh; Danick Dupelle	3:05
4.	"Only a Woman"	Ottoh; Negin Djafari; Tre Jean-Marie	2:57
5.	"Getcha"	Ottoh; Langevin; Dupelle; Kelly Archer	3:15
6.	"Turn Her On"	Ottoh; Dupelle	3:09
7.	"Better When I Drink"	Ottoh; Langevin; Dupelle	2:57
8.	"Woke Up Like This"	Ottoh; Sackley; Brian Layson	3:12
Total length:			24:21

== Charts ==
Chart performance for More
Chart (2020)	Peak position
Canadian Albums (Billboard)	94

=== Singles ===
Chart performance for singles from More
Year	Title	Peak chart positions		Certifications
Year	Title	CAN	CAN Country	Certifications
2019	"Water Down the Whiskey"	—	19	
2020	"Getcha"	98	5	MC: Gold
2020	"Only a Woman"	99	11	
2021	"In a Bar"	—	5	MC: Gold
"—" denotes releases that did not chart

== Release history ==
Release formats for More
Country	Date	Format	Label	Ref.
Various	June 5, 2020	Digital download	Jayward	
Various	June 5, 2020	Streaming	Jayward	
Various	August 21, 2020	CD	Jayward	
