= Getcha =

2020 song by Matt Lang

Single by Matt Lang

from the album More
- Released: May 8, 2020
- Genre: Country; Neotraditional country
- Length: 3:15
- Label: Jayward; Sony Canada
- Songwriters: Mathieu Langevin; Danick Dupelle; Tebey Ottoh; Kelly Archer
- Producers: Danick Dupelle; Tebey

Matt Lang singles chronology
"Water Down the Whiskey" (2019)	"Getcha" (2020)	"Only a Woman" (2020)

Music video
- "Getcha" on YouTube

"Getcha" is a song co-written and recorded by Canadian country artist Matt Lang. He wrote the song with Tebey, Danick Dupelle, and Kelly Archer, while Dupelle and Tebey produced it. It was the second single off his debut studio album More.

== Background ==
With "Getcha", Lang wanted to bring back the sound of traditional country music and line dancing, while he cited inspiration from American country artist Dwight Yoakam on the track. Lang wrote the song with Kelly Archer and his producers, Danick Dupelle of Emerson Drive and labelmate Tebey in Nashville, Tennessee.

== Critical reception ==
Allen Steinberg of Canadian Beats Media stated that "Getcha" "brings a fresh take to old-school country music, giving young and old fans something to enjoy".

== Commercial performance ==
"Getcha" reached a peak of number five on the Billboard Canada Country chart for the week of October 17, 2020, marking Lang's first career top ten hit. It also peaked at number 98 on the Canadian Hot 100 one week prior, marking Lang's first entry on his national all-genre chart. It charted for two weeks there.

== Music video ==
The official music video for "Getcha" was directed by Bruno Labrie and premiered on May 15, 2020. It was filmed in a warehouse in Quebec and shot during the COVID-19 pandemic.

== Charts ==
Chart performance for "Getcha"
Chart (2020)	Peak position
Canada Hot 100 (Billboard)	98
Canada Country (Billboard)	5

== Certifications ==
Region	Certification	Certified units/sales
Canada (Music Canada)	Gold	40,000^{‡}
^{‡} Sales+streaming figures based on certification alone.
