= Without a Prayer =

2020 song by Tim and the Glory Boys

Single by Tim and the Glory Boys

from the album Tim & the Glory Boys
- Released: August 28, 2020
- Genre: Country
- Length: 2:38
- Label: Buckaroo; Sony Music Canada
- Songwriter(s): Brad Rempel; Matt Rogers; Seth Mosley
- Producer(s): Seth Mosley; Mike "X" O'Connor; Tim Neufeld; Colin Trask

Tim and the Glory Boys singles chronology
"When You Know You Know" (2020)	"Without a Prayer" (2020)	"Me Without You" (2021)

Music video
- "Without a Prayer" on YouTube

"Without a Prayer" is a song recorded by Canadian country band Tim and the Glory Boys. The song was written by Brad Rempel of High Valley, along with Seth Mosley and Matt Rogers. Mosley produced the track with X O'Connor as well as Tim Neufeld and Colin Trask from the band. The song was later included on the band's 2023 album Tim & the Glory Boys.

== Background ==
Tim Neufeld, the band's lead singer, stated that the song is "fun, but it's also real". He described it as the "kind of love song that makes sense to me. It's not so much about promising the perfect life as it is about acknowledging how much better ordinary life is because of who you're living it with".

== Live performance ==
Tim Neufeld and Colin Trask of the band appeared on The Morning Show on Global in Canada on December 9, 2020, to perform "Without a Prayer".

== Music video ==
The official music video for "Without a Prayer" premiered on YouTube on August 28, 2020. It was shot in Abbotsford, British Columbia, and directed by Travis Nesbitt.

== Charts ==
Chart performance for "Without a Prayer"
Chart (2021)	Peak position
Canada (Canadian Hot 100)	95
Canada Country (Billboard)	10
