= Only a Woman (song) =

2020 song by Matt Lang

Single by Matt Lang

from the album More
- Released: November 18, 2020
- Genre: Country
- Length: 2:57
- Label: Jayward; Sony Canada
- Songwriters: Tebey Ottoh; Negin Djafari; Tre Jean-Marie
- Producers: Danick Dupelle; Tebey

Matt Lang singles chronology
"Getcha" (2020)	"Only a Woman" (2020)	"In a Bar" (2021)

Music video
- "Only a Woman" on YouTube

"Only a Woman" is a song recorded by Canadian country artist Matt Lang. The song was written by Tebey, Negin Djafari, and Tre Jean-Marie. It was the third single off his debut studio album More.

== Background ==
Lang's friend and label-mate Tebey co-wrote the song and sent it to Lang who liked it immediately and wanted to record it. Lang stated most of the songs on his album More are "old school country" and "fun", and he wanted to have something different with "Only a Woman". He elected to release a piano version of the song later in 2020 when it became a single to "make it extra special" for fans.

== Critical reception ==
BuzzMusic referred to the song as a "sweet Country track that brightens our days with help from the dreamy instrumentals and Matt Lang's warm serenade," saying it "offers emotion from all corners while reminding us to hold our loved ones close".

== Commercial performance ==
"Only a Woman" reached a peak of number 11 on the Billboard Canada Country chart for the week of April 10, 2021. It peaked at number 99 on the Canadian Hot 100 one week later, marking Lang's second entry on that chart.

== Music video ==
The official music video for "Only a Woman" was directed by Sean Cartwright and premiered on November 13, 2020. The video was filmed in Port Burwell, Ontario at The Bayham Estate.

== Track listings ==
Radio single

1. "Only a Woman" – 2:57

Digital download - single

1. "Only a Woman (Piano Version)" – 2:57

== Charts ==
Chart performance for "Only a Woman"
Chart (2021)	Peak position
Canada Hot 100 (Billboard)	99
Canada Country (Billboard)	11
