= Kyle McKearney =

Métis Canadian singer-songwriter

Kyle McKearney is a Métis Canadian alternative country singer-songwriter based in Airdrie, Alberta.

Originally from Fort St. John, British Columbia, he was involved in a number of country and rock musical projects, most notably a stint with a touring production of the jukebox musical We Will Rock You. After going through a period of disillusionment with the state of his career, he returned to Calgary, where beginning in 2020 he posted weekly cover songs to YouTube before recording and releasing his solo debut album Down-Home in 2021.

Down-Home was a Canadian Country Music Award nominee for Alternative Country Album of the Year at the 2022 Canadian Country Music Awards. At the 18th Canadian Folk Music Awards in 2023, McKearney won the award for Contemporary Singer of the Year, and was nominated for Contemporary Album of the Year and Indigenous Songwriter of the Year.

He followed up in 2023 with the album A Traveler's Lament, for which he received CCMA nominations for Alternative Country Album of the Year, Innovative Campaign of the Year, and Record Producer of the Year at the 2023 Canadian Country Music Awards. McKearney would go on to win the "Alternative Country Album of the Year" award.

At the 2025 Canadian Country Music Association Awards, McKearney's album To the River was nominated for Alternative Country Album of the Year, and McKearney and his collaborators received nominations for Record Producer of the Year and Creative Team or Director of the Year.

== Discography ==
=== Albums ===
- Down-Home (2021)
- A Traveler's Lament (2023)
- To the River (2025)

=== Charting singles ===
| Title | Year | Peak chart positions | Album |
| Title | Year | CAN Country | Album |
|---|---|---|---|
| "Rearview" | 2026 | 30 | TBA |
