= I Run on Country =

2023 single by The Washboard Union

Single by The Washboard Union

from the album Westerly
- Released: March 24, 2023
- Recorded: Brentwood, Tennessee
- Genre: Country
- Length: 3:08
- Label: Washboard Union Productions Inc.; Universal Music Canada
- Songwriters: Aaron Grain; Chris Duncombe; Dave Thomson; David Roberts
- Producers: The Washboard Union; Matt McClure

The Washboard Union singles chronology
"Never Run Outta Road" (2021)	"I Run on Country" (2023)	"Gather Round" (2023)

Music video
- "I Run on Country" on YouTube

"I Run on Country" is a song recorded by Canadian country music band The Washboard Union. The three band members wrote the song with Dave Thomson, and co-produced it with Matt McClure. The song marked their first release of new music since their 2020 studio album Everbound, and was the lead single off their 2024 album Westerly.

== Background ==
Chris Duncombe, lead singer and banjo player for the band, described "I Run on Country" as "essentially a love song written to country music". The three members of the band, Duncombe, Aaron Grain, and David Roberts wrote the song with Dave Thomson, formerly of the band Wave, while in the Monashee Mountains. Grain stated that the song came together "quite quickly". Duncombe stated that the four writers knew they "were on to something" when they woke up the next day after writing the song. The song is the first release from what Duncombe described as a "brand new chapter" for the band, after they partnered with Universal Music Canada.

== Critical reception ==
Brent Furdyk of ET Canada described the song as a "hard-driving track with an outlaw country feel".

== Live performance ==
The Washboard Union performed "I Run on Country" live on the CHCH television network's "Morning Live" program as part of their "Music Friday" series on June 23, 2023.

== Music video ==
The official music video for "I Run on Country" premiered on ET Canada on April 13, 2023, and was later uploaded to YouTube the next day. It was filmed in a desert in California, and directed by Cory Osborne, who the band called a "lifelong friend".

== Charts ==
Chart performance for "I Run on Country"
Chart (2023)	Peak position
Canada Country (Billboard)	14
