= Matt Lang =

Canadian country music artist

- Born: Mathieu Langevin
- Origin: Maniwaki, Quebec, Canada
- Genres: Country; neotraditional country
- Occupation: Singer-songwriter
- Years active: 2015-present
- Labels: Independent; Jayward Artist Group
- Website: mattlangmusic.com

Matt Lang is a Canadian country singer and songwriter from Maniwaki, Quebec. He has released three albums More, Moonlight Sessions, and All Night Longer, as well as multiple singles, including "Getcha" and "Only a Woman".

== Early life ==
Lang is from Maniwaki, Quebec. He recalls Johnny Cash's "Folsom Prison Blues" as the first song he ever performed live. While primarily playing hockey as a teenager, Lang realized his true passion was writing and performing music. He cites Cash, Dwight Yoakam, and Merle Haggard as artists he listened to growing up, in addition to regional Quebecois acts Kaïn, Les Colocs, and Okoumé.

== Career ==
Lang began his career as a Francophone singer on Quebec reality show La Voix, North America's French language counterpart to The Voice. He subsequently released a French album before deciding to pursue his passion for country music. When he travelled to Nashville, Tennessee in 2018, Lang stated he was then only learning to speak the English language, while working on his self-titled extended play.

Lang won the second annual SiriusXM "Top of the Country" competition in September 2019. He released his debut country music album, More, on Jayward Artist Group in June 2020, which contains the singles "Water Down the Whiskey", "Getcha", "Only a Woman", and "In a Bar". Lang noted influence of Bakersfield sound and the western-influenced Franco-country music of Quebec in his music. In 2022, Lang collaborated with Tyler Joe Miller on the single "Never Met a Beer", which received a nomination for Musical Collaboration of the Year at the 2023 Canadian Country Music Awards. In 2023, Lang formed a collaboration with the Alpha Tango distillery in Val-d'Or and Harricana Aventures in Amos, producing Moonlight Rum, a rum with banana and maple syrup flavours. The products were made available at SAQ.

In early 2024, Lang toured across Canada on Aaron Pritchett 's "Liquored Up Tour" with Cory Marks. He released his album All Night Longer on May 10, 2024, via Symphonic Distribution. The album includes the singles "All Night Longer", "A Hundred Beers", and "Sweet on You". In February 2025, Lang signed a management contract with River House Artists, a publishing contract with Anthem Entertainment, and a U.S. booking deal with WME. In December 2025, he released an extended play All Night Even Longer, intended to be an add-on to his previous album.

On October 23, 2026, Lang released his fourth studio album Ain't That Bad. It is a concept album, inspired by the film The Hangover, and includes the single "She Stole My Truck".

== Discography ==
=== Albums ===
Title	Details	Peak chart positions
Title	Details	CAN
More	Released: June 5, 2020; Label: Jayward Artist Group / The Orchard / Sony Music Canada; Format: CD, digital download, streaming	94
Moonlight Sessions	Released: June 16, 2023; Label: Matt Lang; Format: Digital download, streaming	—
All Night Longer	Released: May 10, 2024; Label: Matt Lang; Format: CD, vinyl, digital download, streaming	—
Ain't That Bad	Released: October 23, 2026; Label: Matt Lang; Format: CD, vinyl, digital download, streaming	—

=== Extended plays ===
Title	Details	Peak chart positions
Title	Details	CAN
Matt Lang	Released: September 7, 2018; Label: Productions Mathieu Langevin; Format: CD, digital download, streaming	74
All Night Even Longer	Released: December 5, 2025; Label: Matt Lang; Format: Digital download, streaming	—

=== Singles ===
Year	Title	Peak chart positions		Certifications	Album
Year	Title	CAN	CAN Country	Certifications	Album
2019	"Water Down the Whiskey"	—	19	MC: Gold	More
2020	"Getcha"	98	5	MC: Gold	More
2020	"Only a Woman"	99	11		More
2021	"In a Bar"	—	5	MC: Gold	More
2022	"Never Met a Beer" (with Tyler Joe Miller)	—	10		Spillin' My Truth
2024	"All Night Longer"	—	23		All Night Longer
2024	"A Hundred Beers"	—	54		All Night Longer
2024	"Sweet on You"	—	32		All Night Longer
2025	"I've Learned"	—	59		All Night Even Longer
2026	"She Stole My Truck"	—	43		Ain't That Bad
"—" denotes releases that did not chart

=== Christmas singles ===
Year	Title
2024	"Wonderful Christmastime"

=== Music videos ===
Year	Title	Director
2018	"Love Me Some You"	Sébastien Ianuzzi
2018	"My Final Pour"	Sébastien Ianuzzi
2020	"Getcha"	Bruno Labrie
2020	"Only a Woman"	Sean Cartwright
2021	"In a Bar"	Movik Productions
2024	"All Night Longer"	Mouv Film
2024	"Sweet on You"	Not listed
2025	"I've Learned"	Agence Ranch / Forêt Sauvage Films
2026	"She Stole My Truck"	Vickye Morin
2026	"Jukebox Money"	Vickye Morin

== Awards and nominations ==
Year	Association	Category	Nominated work	Result	Ref
2020	Canadian Country Music Association	Rising Star	—N/a	Nominated	
2023	Canadian Country Music Association	Musical Collaboration of the Year	"Never Met a Beer" (with Tyler Joe Miller)	Nominated	
2024	Canadian Country Music Association	Breakthrough Artist or Group of the Year	—N/a	Nominated	
2025	Canadian Country Music Association	Album of the Year	All Night Longer	Nominated	
