= Float (song) =

2022 song by Tim and the Glory Boys

Single by Tim and the Glory Boys

from the album Tim & the Glory Boys
- Released: July 8, 2022
- Genre: Country pop
- Length: 3:34
- Label: Buckaroo; Sony Music Canada
- Songwriter(s): Tim Neufeld; Allen Salmon; Rodney Clawson
- Producer(s): Allen Salmon

Tim and the Glory Boys singles chronology
"Bloodlines" (2021)	"Float" (2022)	"Take Me Backroad" (2023)

Music video
- "Float" on YouTube

"Float" is a song recorded by Canadian country group Tim and the Glory Boys. The song was written by the band's frontman Tim Neufeld along with Rodney Clawson and Allen Salmon, while Salmon also produced the track. In 2023, the band released a rewritten winter-themed remix entitled "Skate".

== Background ==
Tim Neufeld stated that "Float" was the first song of the band's that "perfectly communicated the vibes we live by". He described floating as "possibly the oldest and most universally enjoyed leisure activity there has ever been," adding that collaborating with Rodney Clawson and Allen Salmon was "all of my dreams coming true". The song was recorded in both Chilliwack, British Columbia and Nashville, Tennessee.

== Accolades ==
Year	Association	Category	Result	Ref
2023	Canadian Country Music Association	Songwriter(s) of the Year	Nominated	
2023	Canadian Country Music Association	Video of the Year	Won	

== Music video ==
The official music video for "Float" was directed by Travis Nesbitt premiered on YouTube on July 14, 2022. It was filmed in Abbotsford, British Columbia and features the band members Tim Neufeld, Colin Trask, and Brenton Thorvaldson.

== Charts ==
Chart performance for "Float"
Chart (2022)	Peak position
Canada (Canadian Hot 100)	80
Canada Country (Billboard)	9
