= Do This Life =

2023 single by High Valley and Alison Krauss

Single by High Valley with Alison Krauss

from the album Way Back
- Released: January 13, 2023
- Genre: Country
- Length: 3:02
- Label: Cage Free; Sony Canada
- Songwriter(s): Brad Rempel; David Thompson; Phil Barton
- Producer(s): Sam Bergeson

High Valley singles chronology
| "Country Music, Girls and Trucks" (2022) | "Do This Life" (2023) | "Take Me Backroad" (2023) |

Alison Krauss singles chronology
| "Can't Let Go" (2021) | "Do This Life" (2022) |

Visualizer
- "Do This Life" on YouTube

"Do This Life" is a song recorded by Canadian country music group High Valley with American country music singer Alison Krauss. The group's frontman Brad Rempel wrote the song with David Thompson and Phil Barton, while the track was produced by Sam Bergeson. A solo version of the song was included on High Valley's sixth studio album Way Back in 2022, while the duet with Krauss was released in 2023, and included on the deluxe release of the album later that year.

== Background ==
Brad Rempel of High Valley stated that he and his wife have been longtime fans of Alison Krauss, and that he played Krauss' 1995 song "When You Say Nothing at All" on the guitar when he proposed to her.

After moving to Nashville, Tennessee, Rempel and his wife eventually befriended Krauss and her family. Krauss told Rempel that "Do This Life" was her favourite song on the group's album Way Back, which prompted them to collaborate on a new version of the track. Rempel called the opportunity to duet with Krauss on "Do This Life" a "literal dream come true".

== Accolades ==
| Year | Association | Category | Result | Ref |
|---|---|---|---|---|
| 2023 | Canadian Country Music Association | Musical Collaboration of the Year | Won | |

== Charts ==
Chart performance for "Do This Life"
| Chart (2022) | Peak position |
|---|---|
| Canada Country (Billboard) | 4 |
