= No Better Time =

EP by Dylan Gossett
- Released: October 27, 2023
- Recorded: 2022–2023
- Genre: Americana; Texas country; red dirt; indie folk
- Length: 21:16
- Label: Big Loud Texas; Mercury
- Producer: Dylan Gossett

Dylan Gossett chronology
No Better Time (2023)	Songs in the Gravel (2024)

Singles from No Better Time
- 1. "To Be Free" Released: June 20, 2023; 2. "Coal" Released: July 27, 2023; 3. "Beneath Oak Trees" Released: October 6, 2023

No Better Time is the debut extended play by American country music singer-songwriter Dylan Gossett. It was self-released on October 27, 2023, and was entirely written and produced by Gossett. It was later acquired by Big Loud Texas and Mercury Records when Gossett signed to the labels following the viral success of the EP's second single "Coal". The project also includes the singles "To Be Free" and "Beneath Oak Trees".

== Background ==
Gossett emerged from relative obscurity when he released his debut single "To Be Free" on June 20, 2023, and began to gain a moderate following through social media. The following month, he released what would go on to become the project's second single "Coal" a month later on July 27. The song went viral, largely via TikTok, helping Gossett amass over 30 million Spotify streams and charting on the Billboard Hot 100, Hot Country Singles chart, and in several international markets. Bolstered by the success of the single, "Beneath Oak Trees" was released on October 6, 2023, just ahead of the release of No Better Time, which was released on October 27.

Ahead of the release of No Better Time, Gossett said in a statement: “the storytelling and visualization of a song are important to me. I’m a singer-songwriter at the core. All of these songs I write are completely my own. It feels more special to me because I’m writing about real experiences. I’m essentially playing a movie in my head and creating a story for the listener”.

In an interview with Holler following the EPs release, Gossett explained that the project was “very personal” and listed Ed Sheeran, Mumford & Sons, Shane Smith and The Saints, Tyler Childers, The Lumineers, Marty Robbins, and Colter Wall as the primary sonic and songwriting influences. Discussing the title of the project, he stated “The song idea really started from thinking there's literally no better time than now to try this music thing, like ‘Sweat on your skin is better than regret on your heart’. I don't want to be 10 years from now and think, ‘I could have done it, but I'll never know’...I was sitting in my living room with my wife and a couple of my buddies, and we were just brainstorming names for the EP. It was all made from my bedroom, so we said, ‘Should we call it ‘The Bedroom Tapes’’? And we were like, ‘No, that sounds an R&B record’. Then I was just like, ‘No Better Time’. It fits perfectly”.

== Promotion ==
On December 4, 2023, Gossett and announced his "No Better Time" tour, which began on February 26, 2024, in Dublin, Ireland and concluded in Nacogdoches, Texas on April 27 and included appearances at the C2C: Country to Country, South by Southwest, and Tortuga Music festivals, and supporting slots for Midland and Luke Grimes. Gossett also opened for Noah Kahan during the Australian leg of his Stick Season (We'll All Be Here Forever) Tour.

== Track listing ==
All tracks are written by Dylan Gossett.

No Better Time track listing
No.	Title	Length
1.	"Beneath Oak Trees"	3:57
2.	"No Better Time"	3:45
3.	"To Be Free"	2:48
4.	"Lone Ole Cowboy"	3:52
5.	"Flip a Coin"	3:38
6.	"Coal"	3:14
Total length:		21:16

== Charts ==
Chart performance for No Better Time
Chart (2023)	Peak position
UK Americana Albums (OCC)	10
US Top Country Albums (Billboard)	34
