= Back to Drinkin' Whiskey =

2023 single by Tyler Joe Miller

Single by Tyler Joe Miller

from the album Spillin' My Truth
- Released: February 3, 2023
- Genre: Country
- Length: 2:55
- Label: MDM
- Songwriters: Kelly Archer; Danick Dupelle; Tyler Joe Miller
- Producer: Danick Dupelle

Tyler Joe Miller singles chronology
"Never Met a Beer" (2022)	"Back to Drinkin' Whiskey" (2023)	"Shoulda Known Better" (2023)

Music video
- "Back to Drinkin' Whiskey" on YouTube

"Back to Drinkin' Whiskey" is a song co-written and recorded by Canadian country music artist Tyler Joe Miller. He wrote the song with his frequent collaborators Kelly Archer and Danick Dupelle, while Dupelle produced the track. The songwriters received a nomination at the 2023 Canadian Country Music Awards for "Songwriter(s) of the Year" for the song, while Dupelle won "Record Producer of the Year" for his work on the track. It was the third single released from Miller's album Spillin' My Truth.

== Background ==
Miller stated that "Back to Drinkin' Whiskey" "isn't your average drinking song," and that it is a "love song gone wrong". He framed it as "a story about how the right person can make you feel so whole that you don't need any vices to keep your heart occupied. But once that love leaves you in the dust, you tend to go back to old habits and what doesn’t let you down".

== Critical reception ==
Nanci Dagg of Canadian Beats Media called the song a "soon-to-be hit" that "sends out the vibe demanding it to be heard". Front Porch Music stated that "if you're a fan of country music, then you’ll want to pay close attention to "Back to Drinkin' Whiskey". Top Country stated that the track "showcases Miller's vulnerability and soul searching as an artist" and that it "compliments [his] signature rustic vocals", while positively noting the use of the fiddle. Andrée Ménard of 45Tours stated that the song has "that Tyler Joe Miller trademark sound, which will please fans", while exhibiting "the emotions and storytelling that helped launch" his career.

== Accolades ==
Year	Association	Category	Result	Ref
2023	Canadian Country Music Association	Songwriter(s) of the Year	Nominated	
2023	Canadian Country Music Association	Record Producer of the Year	Won	

== Music video ==
The official music video for "Back to Drinkin' Whiskey" was directed by Ryan Nolan and premiered on Countrytown in Australia on March 23, 2023. It was later uploaded to YouTube other next day. The video was filmed in Nashville, Tennessee and marked the first time that Miller got to play the role of the main character in one of his music videos. He stated that the video "takes you through flashbacks, highlighting a relationship that was strong and displays the parallel of when that love is lost, and the whiskey is stronger".

== Charts ==
Chart performance for "Back to Drinkin' Whiskey"
Chart (2023)	Peak position
Canada Country (Billboard)	9
