= Kolby Cooper =

American singer (born 1999)

- Born: May 31, 1999 (age 27); Bradford, Texas, U.S.
- Origin: Nashville, Tennessee, U.S.
- Genres: Country
- Occupation: Singer-songwriter
- Instrument: Vocals
- Years active: 2019-present
- Label: Combustion/Wheelhouse

Kolby Cooper (born May 31, 1999) is an American country music singer. Active since 2019, he has released two extended plays and charted one single through Combustion Music.

== Biography ==
Kolby Cooper was born in Bradford, Texas. He grew up listening to both outlaw country and grunge, both of which inspired him to learn to play guitar and write songs. Although he initially wanted to be a football player, a high school classmate persuaded him to focus on music instead.

By the time he finished high school, Cooper was married and had begun writing songs full-time. After entering some of his songs in local talent competitions, he released his debut single "Every Single Kiss" in 2017 followed by an extended play a year later. He continued to release songs through Combustion Music throughout the 2010s.

By 2022, Cooper was signed to BBR Music Group's Wheelhouse imprint, which sent the single "Excuses" to radio late in the year. He wrote the song with Brett Tyler and Jordan Walker. It served as the lead single to Cooper's debut album, Boy from Anderson County to the Moon, which was released on August 19, 2022.

== Discography ==
=== Studio albums ===
List of albums, showing other relevant details
Title	Details
Boy from Anderson County to the Moon	Release: August 19, 2022; Label: Wheelhouse Records/Combustion; Formats: digital download, streaming
Love You, Goodnight	Release: April 11, 2025; Label: Wheelhouse Records/Combustion; Formats: digital download, streaming

=== Singles ===
Year	Single	Peak chart positions
Year	Single	US Country Airplay
2022	"Excuses"	35
2025	"Under My Skin"	-
