= Never Met a Beer =

2022 single by Tyler Joe Miller and Matt Lang

Single by Tyler Joe Miller and Matt Lang

from the album Spillin' My Truth
- Released: August 5, 2022
- Genre: Country
- Length: 2:52
- Label: MDM
- Songwriter(s): Danick Dupelle; Tebey Ottoh; Jimmy Thow
- Producer(s): Danick Dupelle

Tyler Joe Miller singles chronology
"Wild as Her" (2022)	"Never Met a Beer" (2022)	"Back to Drinkin' Whiskey" (2023)

Matt Lang singles chronology
"In a Bar" (2021)	"Never Met a Beer" (2022)

Music video
- "Never Met a Beer" on YouTube

"Never Met a Beer" is a song recorded by Canadian country music artists Tyler Joe Miller and Matt Lang. The song was written by Tebey, Jimmy Thow, and Danick Dupelle, while Dupelle produced the track. It received a nomination for Musical Collaboration of the Year at the 2023 Canadian Country Music Awards. It was the second single released from Miller's album Spillin' My Truth.

== Background ==
Miller remarked that he had been a "big fan" of Lang for a long time, and that he couldn't pass up the opportunity to make this song his first collaboration with him. Lang called Miller "one of the most talented artists in the business", adding that he couldn’t "wait to perform this one live together".

== Critical reception ==
Chad Carlson of Today's Country Magazine called the song a "fun loving, upbeat party-anthem," noting its use of "tongue-in-cheek lyrics delivered through southern drawl harmonies".

== Accolades ==
Year	Association	Category	Result	Ref
2023	Canadian Country Music Association	Musical Collaboration of the Year	Nominated	
2023	Canadian Country Music Association	Record Producer of the Year	Won	

== Music video ==
The official music video for "Never Met a Beer" premiered on YouTube on November 8, 2022. It was partially filmed in Saint-Tite, Quebec, with Miller remarking that he and Lang "couldn’t have asked for a better crowd" for the video. The other parts of the video were filmed at Lang's family cottage in Blue Sea in the Outaouais region of Quebec, while the entire video was directed by Bruno Labrie.

== Charts ==
Chart performance for "Never Met a Beer"
Chart (2023)	Peak position
Canada Country (Billboard)	10
