= This Heart (Corey Kent song) =

Single by Corey Kent

from the album Black Bandana
- Released: March 4, 2024
- Genre: Country
- Length: 3:07
- Label: RCA
- Songwriters: Thomas Archer; Blake Bollinger; Jacob Hackworth; Michael Tyler
- Producer: Chris Farren

Corey Kent singles chronology
"Something's Gonna Kill Me" (2023)	"This Heart" (2024)	"Rocky Mountain Low" (2025)

"This Heart" is a song by American country music singer Corey Kent. It was released on March 4, 2024, as the lead single from his fourth studio album, Black Bandana (2024). It is Kent's first number-one on the Country Airplay chart.

== Content ==
"This Heart" was written by Thomas Archer, Blake Bollinger, Jacob Hackworth and Michael Tyler, and produced by Chris Farren.

Kent began teasing the song on his social media accounts as early as August 2023, leading up to its digital release on January 26, 2024.

== Music video ==
The music video for "This Heart" premiered on January 25, 2024. It was directed by Gus and features clips of Kent performing the song while a couple is seen acting out the "downfall of their relationship".

== Charts ==
=== Weekly charts ===
Weekly chart performance for "This Heart"
Chart (2024–2025)	Peak position
Canada Country (Billboard)	11
US Billboard Hot 100	82
US Country Airplay (Billboard)	1
US Hot Country Songs (Billboard)	27

=== Year-end charts ===
Year-end chart performance for "This Heart"
Chart (2025)	Position
US Country Airplay (Billboard)	32
US Hot Country Songs (Billboard)	72

== Certifications ==
Certifications for "This Heart"
Region	Certification	Certified units/sales
Canada (Music Canada)	Gold	40,000^{‡}
United States (RIAA)	Gold	500,000^{‡}
^{‡} Sales+streaming figures based on certification alone.
