= Blacktop (album) =

Studio album by Corey Kent
- Released: June 2, 2023
- Genre: Country
- Length: 34:24
- Label: RCA Nashville
- Producer: Chris Farren; Jay Joyce

Corey Kent chronology
'21 (2021)	Blacktop (2023)	Black Bandana (2024)

Singles from Blacktop
- 1. "Wild as Her" Released: July 18, 2022; 2. "Something's Gonna Kill Me" Released: July 10, 2023

Blacktop is the third studio album by American country music singer Corey Kent. It was released through RCA Nashville on June 2, 2023. It includes the singles "Wild as Her" and "Something's Gonna Kill Me".

== Content ==
Kent co-wrote seven of the album's 10 tracks. Jay Joyce produced the majority of the album, with the exception of "Wild as Her" and "Hood of That Car", which were produced by Chris Farren.

== Track listing ==
Blacktop track listing
No.	Title	Writer(s)	Length
1.	"Wild as Her"	Kelly Archer; Brett Tyler; Morgan Wallen	3:21
2.	"Long Story Short"	Corey Kent; Lydia Vaughan	3:31
3.	"Something's Gonna Kill Me"	Kent; Austin Goodloe; Joybeth Taylor; Vaughan	3:03
4.	"Man of the House"	Kent; Goodloe; Taylor; Vaughan	3:42
5.	"Gone as You"	Casey Brown; Matt McGinn; Travis Wood	3:03
6.	"BiC Flame"	Kent; Jack Hummel; Jon Sherwood	3:11
7.	"Call It a Night"	Aaron Eshuis; Ryan Hurd	3:40
8.	"How You Know You Made It"	Kent; Smith Ahnquist; AJ Pruis	3:37
9.	"Hood of That Car"	Kent; Blake Chaffin; Hummel; Jacob Lutz	3:19
10.	"Once or Twice"	Kent; Lee Miller	3:54
Total length:			34:24

== Charts ==
Chart performance for Blacktop
Chart (2023)	Peak position
US Billboard 200	165
US Top Country Albums (Billboard)	27
