= Tim Neufeld =

Canadian artist (born 1976)

- Origin: Abbotsford, British Columbia, Canada
- Genres: Gospel, bluegrass, folk, country
- Years active: 2000–present
- Website: www.timandthegloryboys.com

This article covers the solo career of Tim Neufeld and his career with his band Tim & The Glory Boys. For Neufeld's career as part of Starfield, see Starfield (band)

Tim & The Glory Boys
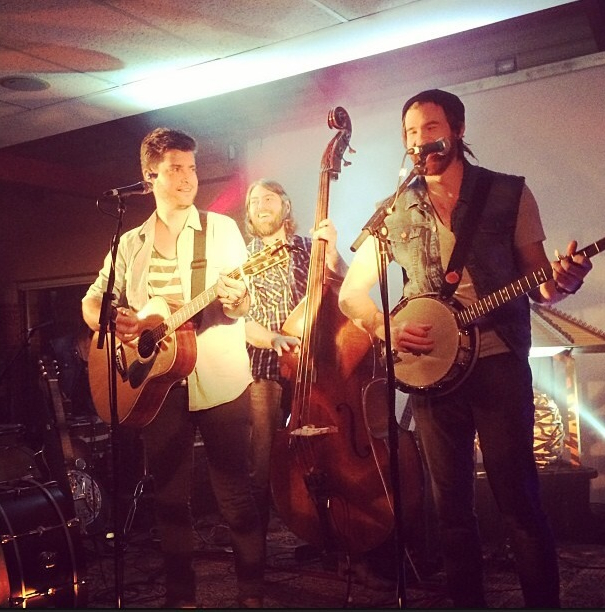
- Tim Neufeld & The Glory Boys play in November 2013

Background information
- Origin: Abbotsford, British Columbia, Canada
- Genres: Country, bluegrass
- Years active: 2013–present
- Label: Sony Music Canada
- Members: Tim Neufeld; Colin Trask; Brenton Thorvaldson
- Past members: Matthew Izaguirre; Jon Bryant; Jon Mushaluk
- Website: www.timandthegloryboys.com

Tim Neufeld (born April 7, 1976) is a Canadian singer, songwriter and recording artist from Winnipeg, Manitoba and now based in Chilliwack, British Columbia, best known as the co-founder and lead singer of Starfield who are four-time Juno Award nominees, Western Canada Music award recipients, winners of 10 GMA Canada Covenant Awards (CGMA) and two Dove Awards. He is currently lead singer of the country music group Tim and the Glory Boys.

== Starfield ==
Tim Neufeld started as the lead vocalist and guitarist of the contemporary worship music band Starfield which he founded in 2000 along with his brother Jon Neufeld.

After releasing three independent albums and four albums with EMI/Sparrow Records with accompanying tours, Starfield was put on hiatus while each brother pursuing solo projects.

== Solo career ==
In June 2013, Neufeld released his first solo album, Trees, which garnered him the GMA Canada Covenant Award 2013 for Modern Worship Album of the Year and the 2014 Juno Award for Contemporary Christian/Gospel Album of the Year. Trees is a collection of worship songs written by Christian artists such as Matt Redman, Michael Gungor, Paul Baloche, and All Sons & Daughters among others and has been described as "Matt Redman meets Mumford and Sons".

Neufeld's first solo album, Trees, won the 2014 Juno Award for Contemporary Christian/Gospel Album of the Year as well as the award for the 2013 CGMA Modern Worship Album of the Year. He released Trees Chapter 2 as a follow-up on October 9, 2015.

== Tim and the Glory Boys ==
In 2013, Neufeld formed a Canadian country and bluegrass trio originally known as "Tim Neufeld & The Hallelujah Glory Boys,” but the name was later shortened to Tim & The Glory Boys

At the beginning the band included Colin Trask (drummer/percussionist for Starfield), Matthew Izaguirre (bassist), Jon Bryant (indie Canadian singer-songwriter on banjo, guitars and dulcimer), and Jon Mushaluk (stand up bass). Neufeld remained the lead singer and frontman.

Initially Tim & The Glory Boys was a Canadian Christian band based in Abbotsford, British Columbia. Later on it became more of a contemporary country and bluegrass band. The band is currently signed to Sony Music Canada. Neufeld and the band spent time in Nashville in early 2014 recording with Starfield producer Allen Salmon crafting songs for Neufeld's second album of original songs, and a debut for the formation. The resulting album The Joy, which was released in September 2014 in the band's name. The Joy earned a 2015 Juno Award nominated for "Gospel Album of the Year".

The band embarked on the Trees Tour in which the band performed in 60+ Canadian cities. The songs from the album Trees took on a distinct bluegrass feel when played live on tour with the featured use of banjo, dobro and dulcimer. Neufeld described the band's sound as "newgrass".

Neufeld's solo album, Trees Chapter 2 was released on October 9, 2015. Tim & the Glory Boys embarked on the Canadian Joyride Tour.

This was followed by Hootenanny! in 2016 winning the Juno award for "Contemporary Christian/Gospel Album of the Year" in 2017. They also won two Covenant awards for "Group of the Year" and "Artist of the Year".

Starting in 2018, the band released a series of singles including "Blessed" in 2019, "When You Know You Know", "Without a Prayer", and "Right Back Atcha" in 2020 along with "Me Without You" and "Bloodlines" in 2021. The band also released the acoustic two-song small EP The Acoustic Sessions in 2021. They released the single "Float" in 2022. In April 2023, they released a self-titled album, which includes the single "Take Me Backroad" with High Valley.

== Discography ==
=== Albums ===
as Tim Neufeld

- Trees (June 4, 2013)
- Trees - Chapter 2 (October 9, 2015)

as Tim and the Glory Boys

- The Joy (September 9, 2014)
- Hootenanny! (September 16, 2016)
- Tim and the Glory Boys (April 28, 2023)

=== Singles ===
as Tim Neufeld

- "I'm Free" (2014)

==== As Tim and the Glory Boys ====
List of singles, with selected peak chart positions
Year	Title	Peak chart positions		Certifications	Album
Year	Title	CAN	CAN Country	Certifications	Album
2020	"When You Know You Know"	—	19	MC: Gold	Tim & the Glory Boys
2020	"Without a Prayer"	95	10		Tim & the Glory Boys
2021	"Me Without You"	—	9		Tim & the Glory Boys
2021	"Bloodlines"	—	46		Tim & the Glory Boys
2022	"Float"	89	9		Tim & the Glory Boys
2023	"Take Me Backroad" (with High Valley)	—	5		Tim & the Glory Boys
2024	"Get Outta My Dreams, Get Into My Truck"	—	30		TBA
2025	"Slow Go the Days"	—	18		TBA
2026	"If I Go Missin'"	—	39		TBA
"—" denotes releases that did not chart

=== Other songs ===
- "When You Know You Know" / "Me Without You" (as a two-song release as The Acoustic Sessions) (February 5, 2021)

== Awards ==
GMA Covenant Awards

Year	Award	Result
2013	Modern Worship Album of the Year ("Trees")	Won
2013	Male Vocalist of the Year	Nominated
2013	Album of the Year ("Trees")	Nominated
2013	New Artist of the Year	Nominated
2013	Artist of the Year	Nominated
2015	Album of the Year (The Joy (with The Glory Boys))	Nominated
2015	Recorded Song of the Year ("I'm Free")	Won
2015	Song of the Year ("I'm Free")	Nominated
2016	Group of the Year	Won
2016	Artist of the Year	Won
2016	Collaboration of the Year ("Ali Matthews & Tim Neufeld")	Won
2016	Male Vocalist of the Year	Nominated
2017	Song of the Year ("Overhead Projector")	Won
2017	Album of the Year	Nominated
2017	Artist of the Year	Nominated
2017	Male Vocalist of the Year	Nominated
2017	Recorded Song of the Year	Nominated

Juno Awards

Year	Award	Result
2014	Contemporary Christian and Gospel Album of the Year ("Trees")	Won
2015	Contemporary Christian and Gospel Album of the Year ("The Joy (Feat. The Glory Boys)")	Nominated
2017	Contemporary Christian and Gospel Album of the Year ("Hootenanny!")	Won
2019	Contemporary Christian and Gospel Album of the Year ("The Buffalo Roadshow")	Nominated

Canadian Country Music Association Awards

Year	Award	Nominated work	Result
2022	Group or Duo of the Year	Tim and the Glory Boys	Nominated
2023	Album of the Year	Tim and the Glory Boys	Won
2023	Group or Duo of the Year	Tim and the Glory Boys	Nominated
2023	Video of the Year	"Float"	Won
2024	Musical Collaboration of the Year	"Take Me Backroad"	Nominated
2024	Video of the Year	"Take Me Backroad"	Nominated
2025	Group or Duo of the Year	Tim and the Glory Boys	Nominated

== Notes ==
1. 2013 Covenant Award Winners:
2. Juno 2014 Nominees and Winners
3. Tim Neufeld Wins 2014 Juno for Contemporary Christian/Gospel Album, Trees
4. Tim Neufeld Artist Profile
5. Tim Neufeld: Trees
6. Juno Award for Tim Neufeld of Abbotsford
7. Kevin's Music Picks: Tim Neufeld, Trees
8. Juno Gala Winners
9. New Release Tuesday: THE JOY
10. Called to pursue joy: Tim Neufeld and the Glory Boys take bluegrass to church
