= Shane Smith and The Saints =

American country band

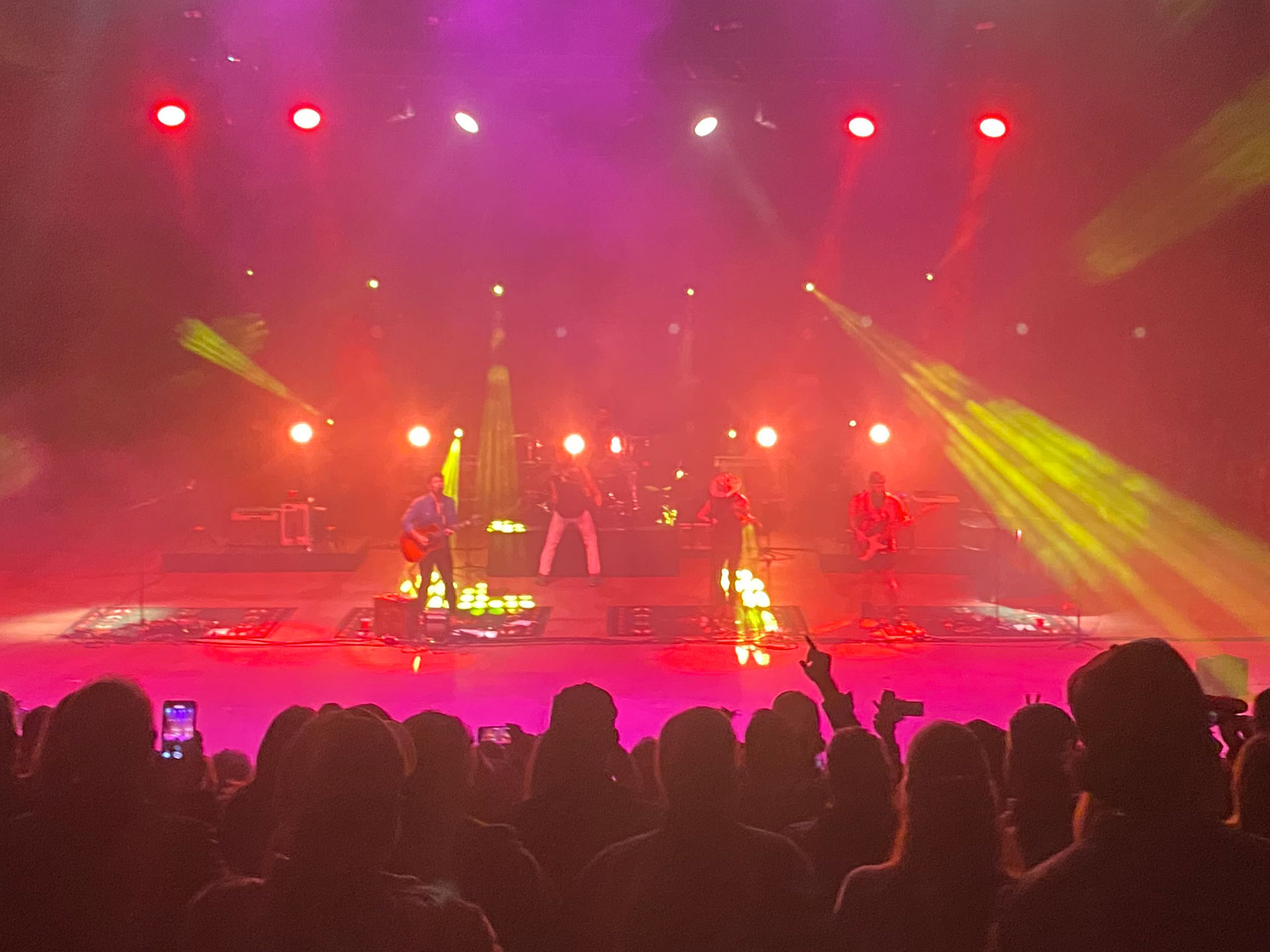
- Shane Smith and The Saints at Red Rocks Amphitheatre

Background information
- Origin: Austin, Texas, U.S.
- Genres: Red Dirt, country
- Years active: 2011–present
- Label: Geronimo West Records
- Members: Shane Smith; Bennett Brown; Dustin Schaefer; Chase Satterwhite; Zach Stover
- Past members: Bryan McGrath; Tim Allen
- Website: https://www.shanesmithmusic.com/

Shane Smith and The Saints is an American red dirt country band from Austin, Texas that formed in 2011 and has released four studio albums. The band currently consists of songwriter Shane Smith, along with Bennett Brown on fiddle, Dustin Schaefer on guitar, Chase Satterwhite playing bass, and Zach Stover playing drums. The band rose to prominence with a broader audience in part due to their appearances on the television series Yellowstone.

== Biography ==
=== 2011 - 2018 ===
Shane Smith and The Saints was formed in 2011 when Shane Smith moved to Austin, Texas and met fiddle player Bennett Brown. They began playing shows in Austin and soon connected with the rest of the band. In 2013, Shane Smith and The Saints released their debut album Coast. The album was recorded in Troubador, TX. The following year, the band appeared on the TV series Lone Star Roads.

In 2015, their second studio album Geronimo was released on Geronimo West Records, with former band members Bryan McGrath (drums) and Tim Allen (lead guitar) playing on the album. This album contains the later recognized Gold Record song "All I See Is You". In 2016, they were listed among "15 Americana, Alt-Country and Folk Artists to Watch in 2016". That year, the band opened for ZZ Top at the Chilifest two-day music festival in Snook and also played at Austin City Limits.

=== 2019 - Present ===
In 2019, the band released the album Hail Mary in chapters, a non-traditional way. The album was produced by Mark Needham and was named "Best Album of The Summer" by American Highways. That year, the band made news when their tour bus caught fire on the way to a show in Lubbock.

In 2021, they released their fourth album, Live from the Desert, a live album which is divided into two parts: an electric side recorded outdoors in the desert, and an acoustic side recorded inside the church of the ghost town of Terlingua. The track "All I See Is You" reached No. 8 on Billboard's Country Digital Song Sales chart.

In late 2023, the band announced a new album, Norther, which was released March 1, 2024.

Among the notable press coverage that Norther received, the band was featured in a Rolling Stone profile the week of the album's launch.

==== Appearances on Yellowstone ====
The band's music and band name have been featured on the neo-Western television drama, Yellowstone, numerous times. Season 4, Episode 3 of the show was titled "All I See Is You" after the band's song of the same name, and featured the song in an extended scene. The band has also appeared on the show. In the first episode of Season 5, the band played three songs at the inauguration of a fictional governor, played by Kevin Costner.

==== Notable performances ====
The band performed at the 2023 inauguration of Texas Governor Greg Abbott. The Governor asked the band to perform based on the popularity of their Yellowstone inauguration performance. In April 2023, Shane Smith & the Saints supported Willie Nelson at the Frost Amphitheater in Palo Alto, CA and, in May 2023, they played a sold out show at Red Rocks Amphitheatre.

Shane Smith & The Saints played their debut headline show at the Ryman Auditorium in Nashville, Tennessee on November 30, 2023.

In February 2024, the band recorded an in-flight performance aboard a Southwest Airlines airplane for the "Live at 35" concert series. In March 2024, the band made their national daytime television debut on CBS Saturday Morning, performing "It's Been A While".

== Discography ==
=== Studio albums ===
Title	Album details	Peak US chart positions					Peak international chart positions				Sales
Title	Album details	US Country	US	US Indie	US Folk	US Rock	AU	CA	ES	IT	Sales
Coast	Release date: October 22, 2012; Label: Geronimo West Records	#24	—	—	—	—	—	—	—	—	
Geronimo	Release date: September 11, 2015; Label: Geronimo West Records	#6	#18	—	—	—	#8	#36	#39	#55	
Hail Mary	Release date: May 8, 2019; Label: Geronimo West Records	26	—	—	—	—	—	—	—	—	
Norther	Release date: March 1, 2024; Label: Geronimo West Records	—	—	—	—	—	—	—	—	—	
