= The Washboard Union =

Canadian country trio

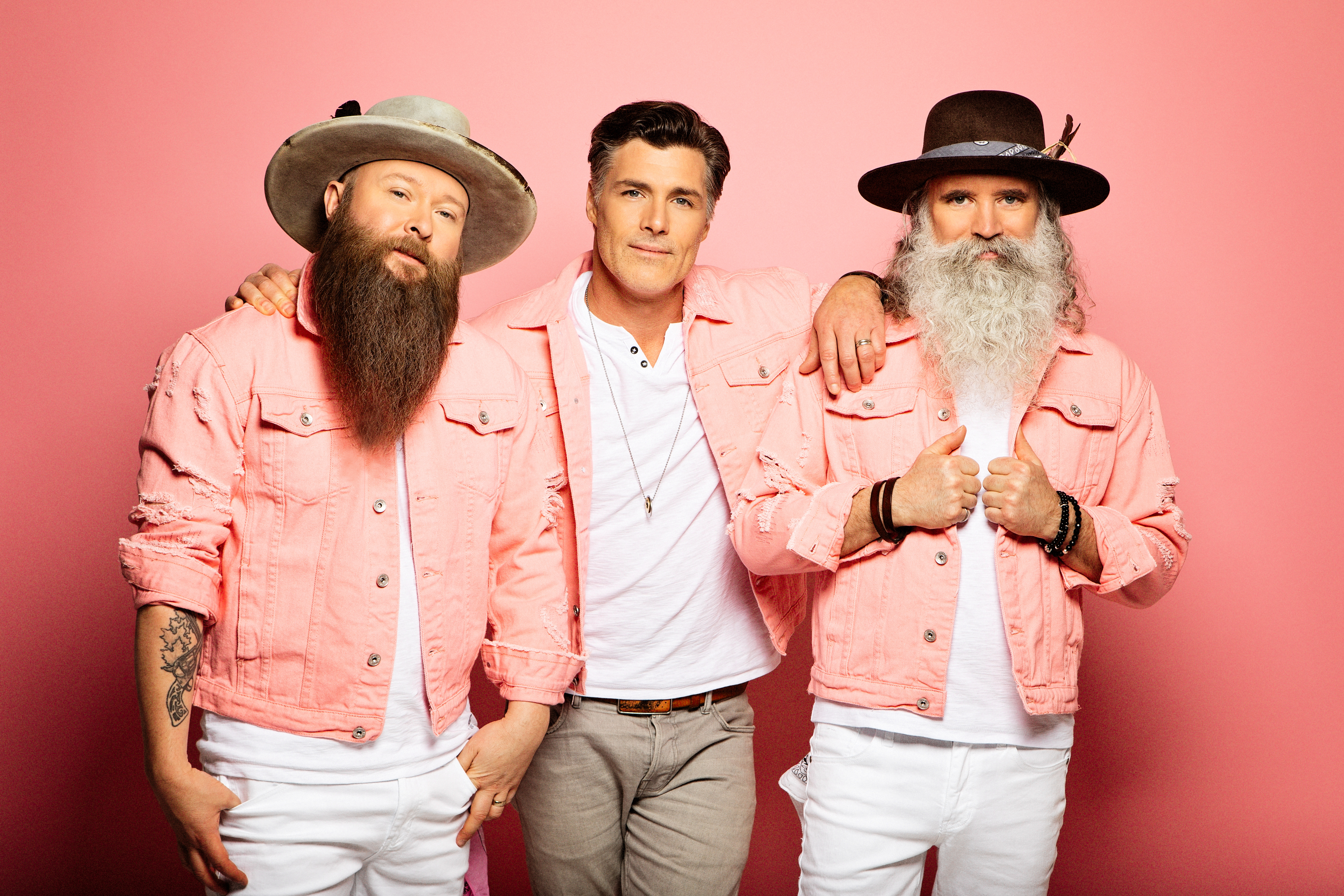

Background information
- Origin: Vancouver, British Columbia, Canada
- Genres: Country, bluegrass
- Years active: 2010–present
- Labels: Arts & Crafts Country; Washboard Union Productions; Warner Music Canada
- Members: David Scott Roberts; Aaron Grain; Chris Duncombe
- Website: www.thewashboardunion.com

The Washboard Union is a Canadian country music group from Vancouver, British Columbia led by principal members David Roberts, Aaron Grain (aka Brett Ellis) and Chris Duncombe.

== Biography ==
Aaron Grain and Chris Duncombe met in Kelowna, British Columbia at age 15 when Duncombe's father began dating Grain's mother. Duncombe and Grain eventually moved to Vancouver, where they met David Roberts, who was living in a Point Grey mansion. The three began writing and singing together. They originally performed under the name Run GMC. Their debut album, The Washboard Union, was released in 2012 and produced by Garth Richardson and Bob Ezrin.

In January 2015, The Washboard Union recorded an extended play, In My Bones, at RCA Studio A in Nashville, Tennessee with producer Trey Bruce. It was released by Slaight Music/Warner Music Canada on July 10, 2015. The first single, "Some Day", went top 40, and the second and third singles, "Maybe It's the Moonshine" and "Shot of Glory", reached the top 10 and top 5 respectively on the Billboard Canada Country chart. In October 2015, The Washboard Union won the British Columbia Country Music Association Award for Roots Canadiana of the Year.

The Washboard Union's next album, What We're Made Of, was produced by Matt Rovey (Zac Brown Band, Dean Brody) in Nashville and Jeff "Diesel" Dalziel in Toronto and Vancouver over the winter of 2017/18. The album's first single, "Shine", was the band's third Top Ten Country Radio hit which they performed live on the Canadian Country Music Awards and walked away with a CCMA Award for 2017 Roots Artist of the Year.

In 2018, the group performed in Liverpool, Nova Scotia at the Queens Place Emera Centre. On November 22, 2019, The Washboard Union released "Country Thunder" as the leadoff single to their third studio album, Everbound, which was released on April 24, 2020. The album's second single was "Dock Rock," followed by "If She Only Knew" and "Never Run Outta Road."

In 2023, the band released their single "I Run on Country" as part of a new distribution partnership with Universal Music Canada.

In 2026, the band signed with indie label Arts & Crafts in Canada, and with ABC Music for Australia and New Zealand.

== Discography ==
=== Studio albums ===
Title	Details
The Washboard Union	Release date: June 26, 2012; Label: self-released; Formats: CD, digital download
What We're Made Of	Release date: April 20, 2018; Label: Warner Music Canada; Formats: CD, digital download
Everbound	Release date: April 24, 2020; Label: Warner Music Canada; Formats: CD, digital download
Westerly	Release date: July 12, 2024; Label: Washboard Union Productions Inc.; Formats: Digital download

=== Extended plays ===
Title	Details
In My Bones	Release date: July 10, 2015; Label: Slaight Music/Warner Music Canada; Formats: CD, digital download

=== Singles ===
Year	Title	Peak positions	Certifications	Album
Year	Title	CAN Country	Certifications	Album
2015	"Some Day"	38		In My Bones
2015	"Maybe It's the Moonshine"	10		In My Bones
2016	"Shot of Glory"	5	MC: Platinum	In My Bones
2016	"Head Over Heels"	19		In My Bones
2017	"Shine"	9		What We're Made Of
2018	"Feel Like That"	11		What We're Made Of
2019	"She Gets Me"	16	MC: Gold	Everbound
2019	"Country Thunder"	2	MC: Gold	Everbound
2020	"Dock Rock"	9	MC: Gold	Everbound
2020	"If She Only Knew"	33		Everbound
2021	"Never Run Outta Road"	17		Everbound
2023	"I Run on Country"	14		Westerly
2023	"Gather Round"	34		Westerly
2024	"Band on Her T-Shirt"	17		Westerly
2025	"Somebody to Love"	26		Non-album singles
2026	"Whisky Wings"	35		Non-album singles

=== Christmas singles ===
Year	Single	Peak positions	Album
Year	Single	CAN Country	Album
2021	"Feliz Navidad"	46	—N/a

=== Music videos ===
Year	Video	Director
2015	"Some Day"	Emma Higgins
2015	"Maybe It's the Moonshine"	Stefan Berrill
2016	"Shot of Glory"	Stefan Berrill
2016	"Head Over Heels"	Stefan Berrill
2017	"Shine"	Travis Nesbitt
2018	"What We're Made Of"	Stephano Barberis
2018	"Feel Like That"	Joel Stewart
2019	"She Gets Me"	Joel Stewart
2019	"Country Thunder"	Stephano Barberis
2021	"If She Only Knew"	Stephano Barberis
2021	"Never Run Outta Road"	Stephano Barberis

== Awards and nominations ==
Year	Award	Category	Nominee/Work	Result	Ref
2014	BCCMA	Roots Canadiana of the Year	The Washboard Union	Nominated	
2015	BCCMA	Album of the Year	In My Bones	Nominated	
2015	BCCMA	Group Duo of the Year	The Washboard Union	Nominated	
2015	BCCMA	Roots Canadiana of the Year	The Washboard Union	Won	
2015	BCCMA	Songwriter of the Year	The Washboard Union	Nominated	
2015	BCCMA	Single of the Year	"Some Day"	Nominated	
2015	BCCMA	Video of the Year	"Some Day"	Nominated	
2016	CCMA Awards	Roots Artist of the Year	The Washboard Union	Won	
2016	CCMA Awards	Rising Star	The Washboard Union	Won	
2016	CCMA Awards	Group or Duo of the Year	The Washboard Union	Nominated	
2016	CCMA Awards	CMT Video of the Year	"Maybe It’s the Moonshine"	Nominated	
2016	BCCMA	Group Duo of the Year	The Washboard Union	Won	
2016	BCCMA	Roots Canadiana of the Year	The Washboard Union	Won	
2016	BCCMA	Entertainer of the Year	The Washboard Union	Nominated	
2016	BCCMA	Fans Choice Award	The Washboard Union	Nominated	
2016	BCCMA	Songwriter of the Year	"Maybe It’s the Moonshine"	Won	
2016	BCCMA	Single of the Year	"Maybe It’s the Moonshine"	Nominated	
2016	BCCMA	Video of the Year	"Maybe It’s the Moonshine"	Nominated	
2017	Canadian Radio Music Awards	Best New Group or Solo Artist: Country	"Maybe It’s the Moonshine"	Nominated	
2017	BCCMA	SOCAN Songwriter of the Year	"Head Over Heels"	Won	
2017	BCCMA	Single of the Year	"Head Over Heels"	Won	
2017	BCCMA	Fan Choice	The Washboard Union	Won	
2017	BCCMA	Website of the Year	The Washboard Union	Won	
2017	BCCMA	Gaylord Wood Traditional Country Award/Roots Country Award	The Washboard Union	Won	
2017	Western Canadian Music Awards	Country Artist of the Year	The Washboard Union	Won	
2017	CCMA	Group Duo of the Year	The Washboard Union	Nominated	
2017	CCMA	Roots Artist or Group of the Year	The Washboard Union	Won	
2018	CCMA	Album of the Year	What We're Made Of	Nominated	
2018	CCMA	Group or Duo of the Year	The Washboard Union	Won	
2018	CCMA	Roots Artist or Group of the Year	The Washboard Union	Won	
2019	Juno Awards	Breakthrough Group of the Year -	The Washboard Union	Won	
2019	CCMA	Group or Duo of the Year	The Washboard Union	Won	
2019	CCMA	Roots Album of the Year	What We're Made Of	Won	
2020	2020 Canadian Country Music Awards	Group or Duo of the Year	The Washboard Union	Won	
2020	2020 Canadian Country Music Awards	Roots Album Of The Year	Everbound	Won	
2020	2020 Canadian Country Music Awards	Video Of The Year	"Country Thunder"	Nominated	
2021	2021 Canadian Country Music Awards	Group or Duo of the Year	The Washboard Union	Nominated	
2024	Canadian Country Music Association	Group or Duo of the Year	The Washboard Union	Nominated	
2025	Canadian Country Music Association	Group or Duo of the Year	The Washboard Union	Nominated	

== Tours ==
=== Headlining ===
- 2017 Dates: Rockin' River Music Fest in Merrit, BC;
- 2018 Dates: July 12 in Calgary, AB at Calgary Stampede;
- 2019 Dates: May 8 in Halifax NS; May 10 in Moncton, NB; May 12 in St. John's, NL; August 2 in Lake Cowichan BC.

=== Supporting ===
- Happy Endings World Tour (2018) with Old Dominion (Western Canada Only)
