= Shoulda Known Better (song) =

2023 single by Tyler Joe Miller

Single by Tyler Joe Miller

from the album Spillin' My Truth
- Released: June 23, 2023
- Genre: Country
- Length: 2:47
- Label: MDM
- Songwriter(s): Tyler Joe Miller; Jeff Johnson; Dan Swinimer
- Producer(s): Danick Dupelle

Tyler Joe Miller singles chronology
"Back to Drinkin' Whiskey" (2023)	"Shoulda Known Better" (2023)	"Broken Man" (2024)

Music video
- "Shoulda Known Better" on YouTube

"Shoulda Known Better" is a song co-written and recorded by Canadian country music artist Tyler Joe Miller. He wrote the song with Jeff Johnson and Dan Swinimer, while it was produced by Danick Dupelle. It is the fourth single from Miller's debut studio album Spillin' My Truth.

== Background ==
Miller wrote the song with his two close friends, Dan Swinimer and Jeff Johnson, while staying in the mountains of British Columbia on a writing retreat. After a night of drinking, the trio was "a bit slow" and we’re writing a slower ballad, when Miller felt they had to "switch gears. Johnson was playing the guitar and Swinimer sang the lyrics "should have known, should have known, should have known better". Miller had the title "Should've Known Better" on his phone as a potential song name, and the trio to began to devise the idea for the song.

Miller described it as being "about seeing that person at the bar, someone walking over everyone’s heart, and yet, you can't resist". In a press release, he added that the "song tells the story from the perspective of the 'sucker' of a guy who fell in love and got burnt again by this girl and goes on to say that this type of person should come with warning signs, but they never do".

== Critical reception ==
Gabby Shukin of CJVR FM described "Shoulda Known Better" as a "fun, high energy song," that is "perfect for summer". She added that she "loves how Miller doesn't take himself too seriously and shares these life lessons with us thru his music". Nanci Dagg of Canadian Beats Media called the track a "toe-tapping tune that packs a punch to the very last beat".

== Music video ==
The official music video for "Shoulda Known Better" premiered on YouTube on August 8, 2023. It was filmed at Gone Country (Twins Cancer Fundraising) in Surrey, British Columbia, and was directed by Carl Sheldon.

== Charts ==
Chart performance for "Shoulda Known Better"
Chart (2023)	Peak position
Canada Country (Billboard)	11
