= Wild as Her =

2022 song by Tyler Joe Miller

Single by Tyler Joe Miller

from the album Spillin' My Truth
- Released: February 11, 2022
- Genre: Country
- Length: 3:01
- Label: MDM
- Songwriters: Brett Tyler; Kelly Archer; Morgan Wallen
- Producer: Danick Dupelle

Tyler Joe Miller singles chronology
"Sometimes I Do" (2021)	"Wild as Her" (2022)	"Never Met a Beer" (2022)

Music video
- "Wild as Her" on YouTube

"Wild as Her" is a song recorded by Canadian country music singer Tyler Joe Miller. It was written by Morgan Wallen, Brett Tyler, and Kelly Archer, and produced by Emerson Drive member Danick Dupelle. Miller's version reached number eight on the Canada Country charts and was certified gold by Music Canada. It was later included on Miller's album Spillin' My Truth. Later that year, American country singer Corey Kent released a version of the song through RCA Records Nashville as his official debut single. Kent's version charted on Billboard Hot Country Songs, Country Airplay, and Hot 100 between 2022 and 2023.

== Background ==
Online outlet Music-News.com hosted an exclusive premiere of the song on February 11, 2022. Morgan Wallen wrote the song with Kelly Archer and Brett Tyler at a songwriting session in 2017. According to a column in Billboard, the song is about "a reversal of the standard gender stereotype in which the free-wheeling male finds a woman stabilizes him". The writers stated that the inspiration was an episode of Sex and the City. When Wallen chose not to record the song, it was recorded by independent country music artist Colby Keeling prior to Tyler Joe Miller's recording in 2022. Archer pitched the track to Miller several years prior to his final recording. Danick Dupelle, a member of the Canadian country band Emerson Drive, produced Miller's version.

== Critical reception ==
Maxwell Barkhuizen of Music Crowns stated that "Wild as Her" "shows exactly why so many have been talking about [Miller]", referring to the track as "lively", saying he "[plays] with the traditional side of the country sound, but [adds] his own distinctive flair throughout". Chad Carlson of Today's Country Magazine said that the song "subtly introduces the internal conflict of finding the balance between finding a way to keep someone in your life while also struggling to realize whether or not that person is right for you", adding that Miller would garner "more fans, more streams, and more critical acclaim" with its release.

== Commercial performance ==
"Wild as Her" reached a peak of number eight on the Billboard Canada Country chart for the week of June 11, 2022, marking Miller's fifth-consecutive top ten hit to begin his career. It also peaked at number 94 on the all-genre Canadian Hot 100 for the same week. The song has been certified Gold by Music Canada.

== Accolades ==
Year	Association	Category	Result	Ref
2022	Canadian Country Music Association	Record Producer of the Year – Danick Dupelle	Nominated	
2023	Canadian Country Music Association	Single of the Year	Nominated	

== Music video ==
The official music video for "Wild as Her" premiered on April 27, 2022. It was directed by David J. Redman and was shot in Nashville, Tennessee. Miller stated that the video "portrays what it's like to be chasing after the girl that all the guys want to lock down", saying that in the end "it's the guy who compliments her wild side that she'll end up with".

== Charts ==
Chart performance for "Wild as Her"
Chart (2022)	Peak position
Canada (Canadian Hot 100)	94
Canada Country (Billboard)	8

== Certifications ==
Region	Certification	Certified units/sales
Canada (Music Canada)	Gold	40,000^{‡}
^{‡} Sales+streaming figures based on certification alone.

== Corey Kent version ==
"Wild as Her"

Single by Corey Kent

from the album Blacktop
- Released: July 18, 2022
- Genre: Country
- Length: 3:20
- Label: RCA
- Songwriters: Brett Tyler; Kelly Archer; Morgan Wallen
- Producer: Chris Farren

Corey Kent singles chronology
"Wild as Her" (2022)	"Something's Gonna Kill Me" (2023)

Subsequent to Tyler Joe Miller's version, American country music singer Corey Kent covered the song. His version was promoted by RCA Records Nashville to country radio in August 2022. It served as Kent's debut single and the lead from his third studio album Blacktop, which was released on June 2, 2023. His version reached number 40 on the Billboard Hot 100 chart and peaked in the top 20 of the Billboard Hot Country Songs chart.

Corey Kent recorded his version in mid-2022 under the production of Chris Farren. The recording session included Fred Eltringham on drums, Jacob Lowery on bass guitar, Gordon Mote on keyboards, and Rob McNelley and Ilya Toshinskiy on guitars. In addition to producing, Farren sang backing vocals on the track as well. Farren told Billboard that he wanted the guitars to "have some attitude", and Kent noted how the melisma on the word "wild" tested his vocal range.

In September 2022, Kent issued a music video for his rendition.

=== Chart performance ===
==== Weekly charts ====
Weekly chart performance for "Wild as Her"
Chart (2022–2024)	Peak position
Canada Country (Billboard)	58
US Billboard Hot 100	40
US Country Airplay (Billboard)	3
US Hot Country Songs (Billboard)	12

==== Year-end charts ====
Year-end chart performance for "Wild as Her"
Chart (2023)	Position
US Billboard Hot 100	93
US Country Airplay (Billboard)	16
US Hot Country Songs (Billboard)	25

=== Certifications ===
Certifications for "Wild as Her" by Corey Kent
Region	Certification	Certified units/sales
Canada (Music Canada)	2× Platinum	160,000^{‡}
United States (RIAA)	3× Platinum	3,000,000^{‡}
^{‡} Sales+streaming figures based on certification alone.
