= 2026 Canadian Country Music Association Awards =

Annual Canadian country music ceremony

- Date: September 19, 2026
- Venue: SaskTel Centre; Saskatoon, Saskatchewan
- Hosted by: James Barker Band
- Most wins: Cameron Whitcomb (4)
- Most nominations: Josh Ross; Cameron Whitcomb; (7 each)

Television/radio coverage
- Network: CTV; Crave

The 2026 Canadian Country Music Association Awards, honouring achievements in Canadian country music, were presented on September 19, 2026, at SaskTel Centre in Saskatoon, Saskatchewan. The show was broadcast live on CTV and streamed live on Crave.

The ceremony was hosted by the James Barker Band. The performers for the ceremony were Dean Brody, The Reklaws, Owen Riegling, Nate Haller, Tenille Townes, High Valley, The Strumbellas, Thelma & James, Brett Kissel, Madeline Merlo, Tyler Joe Miller, Sacha, Tenille Arts, Hunter Brothers, Kalsey Kulyk, and Jess Moskaluke.

Nominees were announced by the CCMA on July 16. Josh Ross and Cameron Whitcomb tied for the most nominations with six each. Whitcomb won the most awards, with four in total.

== Nominees and winners ==
=== Artist ===
Entertainer of the Year	Album of the Year
James Barker Band; Brett Kissel; Owen Riegling; Josh Ross; Cameron Whitcomb	Cameron Whitcomb, The Hard Way; Owen Riegling, In the Feeling; Josh Ross, Later Tonight; Thelma & James, Starting Over; James Barker Band, One of Us
Male Artist of the Year	Female Artist of the Year
Jade Eagleson; Tyler Joe Miller; Owen Riegling; Josh Ross; Cameron Whitcomb	Madeline Merlo; Jess Moskaluke; Meghan Patrick; Sacha; Tenille Townes
Francophone Artist of the Year	Group or Duo of the Year
Francis Degrandpré; Fred Dionne; Gab Forest; Vince Lemire; Laurence St-Martin	High Valley; James Barker Band; The Prairie States; The Reklaws; Thelma & James
Breakthrough Artist or Group of the Year	Fans' Choice
Sully Burrows; Morgan Griffiths; Brock Phillips; Zach McPhee; Josh Stumpf	Jade Eagleson; James Barker Band; Morgan Griffiths; Brett Kissel; Tyler Joe Miller; The Reklaws; Owen Riegling; Josh Ross; Josh Stumpf; Cameron Whitcomb
Single of the Year	Musical Collaboration of the Year
Nate Haller and Tenille Townes, "Backfire"; Morgan Griffiths, "Bourbon"; Josh Ross, "Hate How You Look"; Cameron Whitcomb, "Options"; James Barker Band, "You Didn't Hear It From Me"	Nate Haller and Tenille Townes, "Backfire"; Josh Ross and Akon, "Drunk Right Now (Na Na Na)"; Dallas Smith feat. Alexandra Kay, "How Do You Miss Me"; Sacha with Restless Road, "Shooting Star"; The Road Hammers feat. Tyler Connolly and Ian Thornley, "Till the Wheels Fall Off"
Songwriter of the Year	Video of the Year
Maggie Chapman, Jake Etheridge, Josh Jenkins, MacKenzie Porter — "Alternate Ending" (Thelma & James); Michael August, Nate Hall, James Adam Shelley, Tenille Townes, Stuart Walker — "Backfire" (Nate Haller); Jack Riley, Cal Shapiro, Nolan Sipe, Cameron Whitcomb — "Kingdom of Fear" (Cameron Whitcomb); James Barker, Jim McCormick, Gavin Slate, Todd Clark — "One of Us" (James Barker Band); Zach Kale, Shane Minor, Meghan Patrick — "Safe Place to Break" (Meghan Patrick)	Brett Kissel, "Cowboys & Dreamers"; Meghan Patrick, "Golden Child"; Jess Moskaluke, "I Ain't Country"; Josh Ross, "Later Tonight"; Thelma & James, "Parking Lot Prayers"
Alternative Country Album of the Year	Top Selling Canadian Single of the Year
Tenille Townes, The Acrobat; Shawnee Kish, Chapter 1; William Prince, Further From the Country; Cameron Whitcomb, The Hard Way; Thelma & James, Starting Over	Josh Ross, "Hate How You Look"
Top Selling Canadian Album of the Year	Top Selling Album of the Year
Cameron Whitcomb, The Hard Way	Morgan Wallen, I'm the Problem

=== Musician ===
Bass Player of the Year	Drummer Player of the Year
Tyson Goodvin; Lisa Jacobs; Ben Miller; Brandi Sidoryk; Alex St. Kitts	Spencer Cheyne; Flavio Cirillo; Rich DaSilva; David Larocque; Brendan Lyons; Greg Williamson
Fiddle Player of the Year	Guitar of the Year
Talia Beckie; Tyler Beckett; Denis Dufresne; Julie Jasmin; Catherine Robertson	Chris Bray; Russell Broom; Ryan Davidson; Étienne Joly; Brennan Wall
Keyboard Player of the Year	Specialty Instrument Player of the Year
Amber Bauer; Jared Brake; Cam Buie; Matt Koebel	Derek Caven; Marcel Rousseau; Tyler Vollrath
Steel Guitar Player of the Year
Matty McKay; Kevin Neal; Francis Veillette

=== Radio ===
Radio Station of the Year, Large Market	Radio Station of the Year, Medium/Small Market
CFCW — Edmonton, Alberta; CFXJ-FM — Toronto, Ontario; CHKX-FM — Hamilton, Ontario; CJJR-FM — Vancouver, British Columbia; CKRY-FM — Calgary, Alberta	CFWC-FM — Brantford, Ontario; CHCQ-FM — Belleville, Ontario; CICX-FM — Orillia, Ontario; CJGX — Yorkton, Saskatchewan; CKYL-FM — Peace River, Alberta

=== Industry ===
Booking Agency of the Year	Country Club of the Year
Fame Group Agency; The Feldman Agency; Invictus Entertainment Group; Paquin Artists Agency; Rosemarie Records	Cook County Saloon — Edmonton, Alberta; Horseshoe Tavern — Toronto, Ontario; LANJEU - Lounge & Spectacle — Montreal, Quebec; Ranchman's Cookhouse and Dancehall — Calgary, Alberta
Country Festival, Fair, or Exhibition of the Year	Country Music Program, Special, or Digital Feature of the Year
Big Valley Jamboree — Camrose, Alberta; Boots and Hearts Music Festival — Oro-Medonte, Ontario; Calgary Stampede — Calgary, Alberta; Cavendish Beach Music Festival — Cavendish, Prince Edward Island; LASSO Montreal — Montreal, Quebec	Dallas Smith & His Band (Unplugged) Tour (Behind The Scenes) (Brandon Ferguson); Heartstrings & Honky Tonks Broadcasting LIVE on 840 CFCW (CFCW & SILVERFLOW); On the Porch with Front Porch Music (Front Porch Music); Pure Country Top 50 Countdown with Lainey Wilson, Russell Dickerson and Shannon Ella (iHeartRadio Canada); Russell Dickerson Holiday House Party (Warren Copnick and Ron Tarrant)
Management Company of the Year	Music Publishing Company of the Year
The Core Entertainment; MDM Artist Management Services; Red Light Management Services; Starseed Entertainment; Strut Entertainment	Anthem Music Publishing; Big Loud Publishing; Sony Music Publishing; Universal Music Publishing; Warner Chappell Music Canada
Record Company of the Year	Innovative Campaign of the Year
Big Loud Records; BMG Canada; MDM Recordings Inc.; Sony Music Entertainment (Canada) Inc.; Universal Music Canada	"The Backroad of a Memory" Campaign — Delta Sweet; "Carl Dean" Campaign — Hailey Benedict, Big Loud, Local Hay; "Growing Down" Campaign — Robyn Ottolini; "Killer Instinct" Montreal Canadiens Playoff Campaign — Rick Duff and Rosemarie Records; Later Tonight Album Rollout – Josh Ross, Universal Music Canada
Creative Team or Director of the Year	Recording Studio of the Year
Chris Doi, Roberta Landreth, Kyle McKearney, Jeff Ojeda; Mikey Lavi, Kaity Panayotopoulos, Collin Steinz, Tenille Townes, Jackson Tupper; Bronwin Parks, Amanda Rheaume, Jen Squires; Logan Dane Morrison, Shaina Stein; Mitch Nevins	80A Studios — Toronto, Ontario; Manicdown Studios — Vancouver, British Columbia; MCC Recording Studio — Calgary, Alberta; OCL Studios — Chestermere, Alberta; Wildflower Studios — Airdrie, Alberta
Record Producer of the Year	Retailer or Commercial Platform of the Year
Derek Hoffman — "Going Somewhere" (Tim Hicks), "Good to Drive" (Jessica Sevier), "Rally Around" (Sully Burrows), and "Sad Eyes" (Andrew Hyatt); Karen Kosowski – "Iron Man (Acoustic)", "Jessica Jezebel", and "Safe Place to Break" (Meghan Patrick); Bart McKay — "Jesus Drank Whiskey" (Julia Vos), "Leavin' Town" (Rosewood Ave), and "She'll Come Back Around" (Chevy Beaulieu); Joey Moi — I'm the Problem (Morgan Wallen)); Dan Swinimer — Days Like This (Tony Stevens), "Feels Like Forever" (The Prairie States), "Listen" (Chad Brownlee), and "He's the One" (Savannah Jade)	Amazon Music; Apple Music; SiriusXM Canada; Spotify Canada Inc.
Talent Buyer or Promoter of the Year	Country Personality(ies) of the Year
Jim Cressman (Invictus Entertainment Group); Dan Clapson (Blue Jay Sessions); Brooke Dunford (Republic Live); Chris Melnychuk (SILVERPLOW Productions Inc.); Denise Ross (Live Nation Entertainment)	Shannon Ella (Pure Country Radio National Midday); Tracy Lynn (CFWC-FM); Jason McCoy (CICX-FM); Sam McDaid (CIKZ-FM); Logan Miller & Jenna Weishar (On the Porch with Front Porch Music)
Industry Person of the Year	International Industry Person of the Year
Justin Clark (Big Loud Records); Warren Copnick (Sony Music Entertainment (Canada) Inc); Lindsay Hyslop (BMG Canada); Emilie Pallick (604 Records); Craig Senyk (SkySong Records, Senyk Initiatives)	Seth England; Sina Hall; Baylen Leonard; Justin Thomason; Frank Varrasso
Gary Slaight Music Humanitarian Award
Brett Kissel and W. Brett Wilson

== Performances ==
Performer(s)	Song
Hunter Brothers; Jess Moskaluke; Kalsey Kulyk; Tenille Arts	"Born and Raised"
Owen Riegling	"Love Hate Love"
Nate Haller; Tenille Townes	"Backfire"
High Valley; The Strumbellas	"Hanging Out In My Head" "Spirits"
Madeline Merlo; Sacha	"Coat of Many Colors"
Brett Kissel; Tyler Joe Miller; Madeline Merlo; Sacha others (Note: The performance also included guest appearances by Ty Hunter of the Hunter Brothers, Owen Riegling, Hailey Benedict, Nate Haller, Kalsey Kulyk, James Barker, High Valley, The Strumbellas, Jess Moskaluke, Tenille Arts, and Josh Stumpf)	"9 to 5"
Thelma & James	"Alternate Ending"
Stella Lefty	"Boston"
The Reklaws; Dean Brody	"Hometown Heroes"
Dean Brody	"Death of Me"
James Barker Band	"After Dark"

== See also ==
- 2026 in Canadian music
- 2026 in country music
