= 2026 in Canadian music =

The following musical events and releases are expected to happen in 2026 in Canada.

== Notable events ==
- March 29 - Juno Awards of 2026
- April 9-12 - 21st Canadian Folk Music Awards
- April 24 - SOCAN and SiriusXM Canada announce the creation of a new South Asian Music Prize to honour emerging creators of South Asian music in Canada.
- April 28 - Feist, Loverboy, The Tragically Hip and Roch Voisine are announced as this year's inductees into the Canadian Songwriters Hall of Fame.
- June 25 - The Canadian Broadcasting Corporation is approved for full membership in the European Broadcasting Union. In addition to newsgathering and content-sharing with European broadcast networks, this opens up Canada's participation in the Eurovision Song Contest 2027.
- September 19 - 2026 Canadian Country Music Association Awards
- September 22 - 2026 Polaris Music Prize

=== Dates TBA ===
- 48th Félix Awards

== Albums set to be released ==
=== 0-9 ===
- 54-40, Porto - January 23

=== A ===
- Angine de Poitrine, Vol. II - April 3
- Aquakultre, 1783 - February 6
- Archspire, Too Fast to Die - April 10
- Arkells, Between Us - April 17

=== B ===
- Baby Nova, Shhugar - January 16
- Bibi Club, Amaro - February 27
- Black Atlass, Eternity - August 21
- Boy Golden, Best of Our Possible Lives - February 13
- Jacob Brodovsky, Tell the Kids We Tried - July 10
- Dean Brody, The Tenth Album (Side A) - June 26
- Broken Social Scene, Remember the Humans - May 8
- Burnt Black, Heretical - January 30

=== C ===
- Cadence Weapon, Forager - April 24
- Ora Cogan, Hard Hearted Woman - March 13
- Charlotte Cornfield, Hurts Like Hell - March 27
- CRi, AMi Vol. 1 - April 24
- Devin Cuddy, Livin' Hard Ain't Easy - April 17

=== D ===
- Daphni, Butterfly - February 6
- DJ Shub, Heritage (Part Two) - May 1
- Gord Downie and The Sadies, Live at 6 O'Clock - February 27
- Drake, Habibti - May 15
- Drake, Iceman - May 15
- Drake, Maid of Honour - May 15

=== F ===
- Luca Fogale, Challenger - January 30

=== G ===
- Beverly Glenn-Copeland, Laughter in Summer - February 6

=== H ===
- Nate Haller, Can't Stay Here - September 25
- Hayden, The Recent Past - November 6
- Tim Hicks, Going Somewhere - May 22
- High Valley, Paradise & Hurricanes - March 6
- Holy Fuck, Event Beat - March 27

=== J ===
- Josiane, Take Care - March 27

=== K ===
- Kardinal Offishall, Firestarter Vol 2: Everyday, Sometimes… - September 25
- Mia Kelly, Big Time Roller Coaster Feeling - May 22

=== L ===
- Matt Lang, Ain't That Bad - October 23
- Abigail Lapell, Shadow Child - May 8
- Sook-Yin Lee, 72RHR - May 29
- Glenn Lewis, Overture - June 19
- Les Louanges, Alouette! - April 10

=== M ===
- Majid Jordan, Two Roads - August 28
- Jay Malinowski, Under a Landslide of Stars - March 13
- Metric, Romanticize the Dive - April 24

=== N ===
- The New Pornographers, The Former Site Of - March 27

=== O ===
- Robyn Ottolini, A Safe Place to Land - August 21

=== P ===
- Peaches, No Lube So Rude - February 20
- Pony, Clearly Cursed - February 13

=== R ===
- The Reklaws, Blood, Sweat & Beers - October 16
- Owen Riegling, In the Feeling - April 17
- Daniel Romano, Preservers of the Pearl - March 13
- Allison Russell, In the Hour of Chaos - July 10
- Ruth B., Peace to Make - August 21

=== S ===
- Saukrates, Father Time - September 22
- JP Saxe, Okay Piano Guy - October 23
- Joseph Shabason and Nick Krgovich, Four Days in June - June 12
- The Sheepdogs, Keep Out of the Storm - February 27
- Vivek Shraya, VIVICA - May 20
- Softcult, When a Flower Doesn't Grow - January 30
- Arielle Soucy, Passages - March 27
- Rae Spoon, Assigned Country Singer at Birth - April 10

=== T ===
- Tanya Tagaq, Saputjiji - March 6
- Tenille Townes, The Acrobat - April 10
- The Tragically Hip, The Tragically Hip: Live July 22 – August 20, 2016 - August 21
- Katie Tupper, Greyhound - January 21
- Shania Twain, Little Miss Twain - July 24

=== W ===
- Cameron Whitcomb, Deep Water - April 17
- Wintersleep, Wishing Moon - March 27
- Finn Wolfhard, Fire from the Hip - July 10
- Donovan Woods, Squander Your Gifts - February 27

== Deaths ==
- April 5 - David Wiffen, singer-songwriter
- April 10 - Dinah Christie, actress and singer
- April 13 - Donald K. Tarlton, record producer and concert promoter
- April 14 - Taylor Kirk, singer and songwriter
- May 15 - Cris Derksen, cellist and composer
- June 24 - David Clayton-Thomas, rock singer
- July 2 - Tommy Hunter, country singer and television variety host
- July 22 - Oliver Jones, jazz pianist
- September 15 - Pye Dubois, songwriter
- October 2 - Sass Jordan, rock singer
