= Nothing as It Seems =

Nothing as It Seems may refer to:

- "Nothing as It Seems" (song), a song by Pearl Jam
- Nothing as It Seems (album), an album by Wave
- "Nothing as It Seems" (Fringe), an episode of Fringe
