= Thought About You (Nate Haller song) =

2026 single by Nate Haller

Single by Nate Haller

from the album Can't Stay Here
- Released: January 23, 2026
- Genre: Country
- Length: 3:24
- Label: Starseed
- Songwriters: Todd Clark; Ines Dunn; Zach John King
- Producer: Todd Clark

Nate Haller singles chronology
"Backfire" (2025)	"Thought About You" (2026)	"Called It" (2026)

Music video
- "Thought About You" on YouTube

"Thought About You" is a song recorded by Canadian country artist Nate Haller. The song was written by Ines Dunn, Zach John King, and Todd Clark, the latter of whom produced it. It marked Haller's second consecutive single to reach the top five of the Canada Country chart.

== Background and content ==
Haller described the meaning of "Thought About You" as "that 'you're getting over someone feeling' then you go out and see something, or hear a song, or see that person" and it "sends you into a bit of a spiral." The song was sent to Haller by his producer Todd Clark, who co-wrote the song, as a verse and chorus only. Haller knew immediately that he wished to record it and began working on it shortly thereafter.

Heather Taylor-Singh of Billboard Canada described the song as a "vulnerable moment" that "captures the quiet aftermath of a love that never fully lets go." The song served as the namesake for Haller's debut headlining tour in 2026, the "Thought About You Roadshow".

== Critical reception ==
Top Country named the song one of their "Top 10 Canadian Country Songs for Summer 2026" and opined that the song "highlights Haller's ability to balance honest storytelling with a polished country sound".

== Music video ==
The official music video for "Thought About You" was directed by Austin Chaffe and premiered on YouTube on January 23, 2026, concurrently with the release of the song.

== Credits and personnel ==
Credits adapted from Apple Music.

- Joao Carvalho – mastering engineer
- Jay Dufour – mixing engineer
- Todd Clark – keyboard, production
- Nate Haller – vocals
- Sam Hunter – mandolin
- Zach John King – guitar
- Owen Lewis – engineering
- Jerry Roe – drums

== Charts ==
Chart performance for "Thought About You"
Chart (2026)	Peak position
Canada (Canadian Hot 100)	93
Canada Country (Billboard)	5
