= Zach John King =

American country music singer (born 1997)

- Born: March 25, 1997 (age 29); Fayetteville, Georgia, U.S.
- Genre: Country
- Occupations: Singer, songwriter
- Instruments: Vocals, guitar
- Years active: 2023–present
- Label: Sony Nashville

Zachary John King (born March 25, 1997) is an American country music singer. Active since 2023, King has released two extended plays on Sony Music Nashville and made the Billboard country music charts with his single "Get to Drinkin'".

== Biography ==
Zach John King was born in Fayetteville, Georgia. He took an interest in country music through his grandmother, and moved to Nashville, Tennessee, in 2021 to pursue a career in the genre. Shortly before that, he auditioned for the 19th season of American Idol, receiving a Golden Ticket to Hollywood week but being eliminated there. After releasing a number of songs independently, he signed to Sony Music Nashville in 2024 and released an extended play titled Wannabe Cowboy. This was followed in 2025 by a second extended play titled Slow Down.

King released his debut single "Get to Drinkin'" in early 2026. Soon afterward, King was signed as an opening act on Morgan Wallen's I'm the Problem Tour. This was followed later in the year by the announcement of his debut album I'm What You Get. King produced the album with Ryan Wilson and co-wrote all 20 of its songs. The project also includes guest vocals from Brent Cobb and Brooks & Dunn. However, he canceled several tour dates in July due to the death of his father. King co-wrote the 2026 Nate Haller single "Thought About You".

== Discography ==
=== Studio albums ===
List of studio albums, with selected details, chart positions, and sales
Title	Album details
I'm What You Get	Release date: August 28, 2026; Label: Sony Nashville; Format: CD, vinyl, digital download, streaming

=== Extended plays ===
Title	Details
Wannabe Cowboy	Release date: May 24, 2024
Slow Down	Release date: May 23, 2025

=== Singles ===
Title	Year	Peak chart positions					Album
Title	Year	US	US Country	US Country Airplay	CAN	CAN Country	Album
"Get to Drinkin'"	2026	53	14	1	65	6	I'm What You Get

=== Other charted songs ===
Year	Title	Peak chart positions	Album
Year	Title	US Country	Album
2026	"How to Not"	44	I'm What You Get
