= Love Me Like an Outlaw =

2023 single by Kalsey Kulyk

Single by Kalsey Kulyk

from the album Outlaw Poetry
- Released: September 15, 2023
- Genre: Country; traditional country
- Length: 3:25
- Label: Independent; GPS Promo
- Songwriter(s): Kalsey Kulyk; Davis Corley; Mark Addison Chandler

Kalsey Kulyk singles chronology
"Ain't Enough Whiskey" (2023)	"Love Me Like an Outlaw" (2023)	"Dontcha" (2024)

Music video
- "Love Me Like an Outlaw" on YouTube

"Love Me Like an Outlaw" is a song co-written and recorded by Canadian country music artist Kalsey Kulyk. She wrote the song with Davis Corley and Mark Addison Chandler. It became Kulyk's first top 30 hit at Canadian country radio. The song is included on her 2024 debut studio album, Outlaw Poetry.

== Background ==
Kulyk wrote the track with two other songwriters in Nashville in 2018. After holding the song for years, and becoming an independent artist, Kulyk elected to put the song on the list for her upcoming album. She received a great response from her producer and radio tracker, who told her she must record it. Kulyk stated "sometimes you just got to go with your gut".

== Critical reception ==
Jenna Melanson of Canadian Beats Media described "Love Me Like an Outlaw" as "beautifully produced, perfectly delivered, poetic country". New Country 103.1 named the song their "Trending Track" in August 2023.

== Live performance ==
Kulyk performed "Love Me Like an Outlaw" live for 92.9 The Bull. She later performed the song on television for Global News Morning Saskatoon on December 8, 2023.

== Music video ==
The official music video for "Love Me Like an Outlaw" premiered exclusively on Tinnitist on November 21, 2023, and was made available on YouTube later that day. Kulyk and her husband Eric Ethridge shot and edited most of the footage for the video together. They filmed the video on a ranch belonging to a friend of Kulyk's cousin, and at Kulyk's cousin's cabin in Canmore, Alberta.

== Charts ==
Chart performance for "Love Me Like an Outlaw"
Chart (2023)	Peak position
Canada Country (Billboard)	20
