= Kiss Me Goodbye =

Kiss Me Goodbye may refer to:

- "Kiss Me Goodbye" (song), a song by Petula Clark from the 1968 album Petula
- "Kiss Me Goodbye", a song by Buck-Tick from the 1990 album Aku no Hana
- "Kiss Me Good-Bye", a song by Angela Aki from the 2006 album Home, used as the ending theme song for Final Fantasy XII
- "Kiss Me Goodbye", a song by Eric Ethridge from the 2020 album Good with Me
- Kiss Me Goodbye (film), a 1982 film
