= On a Different Night =

2022 single by Josh Ross

Single by Josh Ross
- Released: July 15, 2022
- Genre: Country
- Length: 3:09
- Label: The Core; Universal Canada
- Songwriter(s): Josh Ross; Grady Block; Mason Thornley
- Producer(s): Matt Geroux

Josh Ross singles chronology
"First Taste of Gone" (2022)	"On a Different Night" (2022)	"Trouble" (2023)

Music video
- "On a Different Night" on YouTube

"On a Different Night" is a song co-written and recorded by Canadian country music artist Josh Ross. He wrote the song with Grady Block and Mason Thornley, while the track was produced by Matt Geroux. The track marked Ross's first new release after signing a major label deal with Universal Music Canada and The Core Entertainment.

== Background and release ==
Ross and co-writer Mason Thornley were at a Virgin Hotel rooftop bar in Nashville, Tennessee going through ideas when they first began to write "On a Different Night". They finished the first verse and chorus while there, without having an instrument present. Ross referred to it as a "personal track," noting that he "wrote the song about going out places with an ex-girlfriend and how difficult it was to revisit them without her and to have fun knowing that we used to share those moments." He added that he "wanted listeners that may have gone through a similar situation to relate and connect with the lyrics while giving the energy and momentum to uplift the song."

The song served as the follow-up to Ross' first charting hit "First Taste of Gone" and was initially released to digital and streaming platforms on July 15, 2022. It was later officially sent to Canadian country radio stations in September 2022. Ross recorded a live version of the track for his Live Sessions extended play that was released in November 2022.

== Critical reception ==
Erica Zisman of Country Swag referred to "On a Different Night" as "nostalgic, heartbreaking, and relatable," stating that it "paints the picture of what it’s like being out, but not really being in the mood to drink and have fun." She also added that the song further proves that Ross "can express any emotion through lyrics."

== Live performance ==
Ross performed "On a Different Night" during the halftime show at the 109th Grey Cup in Regina, Saskatchewan on November 20, 2022. His performance was part of a "one-time-only collaboration" with American country artists Tyler Hubbard and Jordan Davis. It was broadcast nationally in Canada on TSN and RDS, while ESPN2 aired the event in the United States. Ross' performance was uploaded to YouTube three days after the game.

== Accolades ==
Year	Association	Category	Result	Ref
2023	Country Music Association of Ontario	Songwriter(s) of the Year	Nominated	
2023	Canadian Country Music Association	Single of the Year	Nominated	

== Music video ==
The official music video for "On a Different Night" was directed by Wales Toney and premiered on YouTube on November 18, 2022. Ross also released a video for his rendition of the song that was included on his Live Sessions extended play on November 11, 2022.

== Credits and personnel ==
Credits adapted from AllMusic.

- Grady Block – composition
- Matt Geroux – bass guitar, drums, keyboard, production, programming, recording
- Josh Ross – composition, primary vocals
- Jonathan Roye – mixing
- Dan Shike – master engineering
- Mason Thornley – composition
- Jake Widenhofer – guitar

== Charts ==
Chart performance for "On a Different Night"
Chart (2023)	Peak position
Canada (Canadian Hot 100)	65
Canada Country (Billboard)	4

== Certifications ==
Region	Certification	Certified units/sales
Canada (Music Canada)	Platinum	80,000^{‡}
^{‡} Sales+streaming figures based on certification alone.
