= Wave (band) =

Canadian pop rock duo

- Origin: Niagara Falls, Ontario, Canada
- Genres: Pop rock, pop
- Years active: c. 1999–2003, 2016
- Label: Warner
- Members: Dave Thomson; Paul Gigliotti

Wave was a Canadian pop rock duo composed of Dave Thomson and Paul Gigliotti. They formed in 1999 in Niagara Falls, Ontario, and are best known for their 2001 singles, "California" and "Think It Over", both of which were Top 10 radio hits in Canada. Their debut album, Nothing as It Seems, was a success, achieving gold certification. However, their second album, State of Mind, was a commercial failure. The band folded in 2003, with Thomson and Gigliotti pursuing separate careers in the music industry. The duo reunited in 2016 for a single show in their hometown.

== Discography ==
=== Studio albums ===
Year	Album details	Chart positions
2001	Nothing as It Seems: Release date: June 19, 2001; Label: Warner Music Canada	29
2002	State of Mind: Release date: October 15, 2002; Label: Warner Music Canada	53

=== Singles ===
Year	Single	Peak positions	Album
Year	Single	CAN	Album
2001	"California"	7	Nothing as It Seems
2001	"Think It Over"	7	Nothing as It Seems
2002	"Sleepless"	23	Nothing as It Seems
2002	"That's How It Feels"	10	State of Mind
2002	"Don't Say Sarah"	18	State of Mind
