= Single Again (Josh Ross song) =

2024 single by Josh Ross

Single by Josh Ross

from the EP Complicated and the album Later Tonight
- Released: January 12, 2024
- Studio: Matt Geroux Recording (Hendersonville, Tennessee)
- Genre: Country
- Length: 2:59
- Label: The Core; Universal Canada; Mercury Nashville
- Songwriters: Josh Ross; Joe Fox; Brad Rempel
- Producer: Matt Geroux

Josh Ross singles chronology
| "Ain't Doin' Jack" (2023) | "Single Again" (2024) | "Leave Me Too" (2025) |

Music video
- "Single Again" on YouTube

"Single Again" is a song co-written and recorded by Canadian country artist Josh Ross. He co-wrote the track with Joe Fox and Brad Rempel of High Valley, while Matt Geroux produced it. The song is the lead single to radio from Ross's debut album, Later Tonight. It reached number one on the Mediabase Canada Country chart, and became his first top ten single on the Billboard Country Airplay. In 2025, the song reached number one on the Mediabase Country chart in the U.S. after 71 weeks, making Ross the third Canadian male solo artist to ever top that chart, and the first since Paul Brandt ("I Do") in 1996.

== Background and release ==
Ross released "Single Again" along with the song "Truck Girl" in January 2024. He stated that the song "leans into how timing can sometimes be everything." Ross said he was inspired by a time when "I ran into my high school crush at a bar and wanted to buy her a drink. She let me know she had a boyfriend and I remember saying 'well let me know if you're ever single again'." The song was serviced to American country radio in February 2024, and was later serviced to Canadian country radio in the summer of 2024. Ross's debut U.S. headlining tour in the late summer and fall of 2024 was named the "Single Again Tour" after the song.

== Accolades ==
| Year | Association | Category | Result | Ref |
|---|---|---|---|---|
| 2025 | Canadian Country Music Association | Single of the Year | Won | |
| 2025 | Canadian Country Music Association | Video of the Year | Won | |

== Live performance ==
In March 2024, he performed parts of "Single Again" and "Trouble" at the 2024 Juno Awards in Halifax, Nova Scotia, which was aired live on CBC.

== Music videos ==
Ross released two videos for the song. The official tour performance video for "Single Again", directed by Korey Schaefer, premiered on YouTube on March 29, 2024. The official music video, directed by Jack Owens, was released on October 30, 2024.

== Track listing ==
Digital download – single

1. "Single Again" – 2:59
2. "Truck Girl" – 3:08

Digital download – remixes

1. "Single Again" (Down South Remix) – 2:59
2. "Single Again" (West Coast Remix) – 2:56

== Charts ==
=== Weekly charts ===
Weekly chart performance for "Single Again"
| Chart (2024–2025) | Peak position |
|---|---|
| Australia Country Hot 50 (The Music) | 4 |
| Canada (Canadian Hot 100) | 60 |
| Canada Country (Mediabase) | 1 |
| UK Country Airplay (Radiomonitor) | 4 |
| US Billboard Hot 100 | 73 |
| US Country Airplay (Billboard) | 2 |
| US Hot Country Songs (Billboard) | 22 |

=== Year-end charts ===
Year-end chart performance for "Single Again"
| Chart (2025) | Position |
|---|---|
| US Country Airplay (Billboard) | 16 |
| US Hot Country Songs (Billboard) | 56 |

== Certifications ==
Certifications for "Single Again"
| Region | Certification | Certified units/sales |
|---|---|---|
| Canada (Music Canada) | 2× Platinum | 160,000^{‡} |
| United States (RIAA) | Gold | 500,000^{‡} |
^{‡} Sales+streaming figures based on certification alone.
