= California (Wave song) =

2001 single by Wave

Single by Wave

from the album Nothing As It Seems
- Released: 2001
- Genre: Pop rock
- Length: 3:43
- Label: Warner Music Canada
- Songwriters: Dave Thomson, Ben Dunk

Wave singles chronology
"California" (2001)	"Think It Over" (2001)

"California" is a song by Canadian pop rock band Wave. It was released in 2001 as the lead single from their debut album, Nothing As It Seems. The song was a hit in Canada, peaking at No. 7 on Canada's Airplay chart. The song was the 18th most played song on Canadian radio in 2001, and the third-most played song on Canadian radio in 2001 by a Canadian artist. The song was also nominated for "Best Single" at the 2002 Juno Awards.

== Year-end charts ==
Year-end chart performance for "California" by Wave
Chart (2001)	Position
Canada Radio (Nielsen BDS)	18

== Eric Ethridge version ==
"California"

Single by Eric Ethridge

from the EP Eric Ethridge
- Released: October 2018
- Genre: Country pop
- Length: 3:16
- Label: Independent
- Songwriters: Dave Thomson; Ben Dunk
- Producer: Brian Howes

Eric Ethridge singles chronology
"Makin' Me Crazy" (2017)	"California" (2018)	"If You Met Me First" (2019)

In 2018, Canadian country singer Eric Ethridge also recorded a cover version of the song. His version was included on his debut self-titled extended play.

=== Commercial performance ===
Ethridge’s version peaked at number 35 on the Billboard Canada Country chart and was certified Gold by Music Canada.

=== Music video ===
The official music video for Ethridge's version of "California" premiered on September 6, 2018.

=== Charts ===
Chart (2018)	Peak position
Canada Country (Billboard)	35

=== Certifications ===
Region	Certification	Certified units/sales
Canada (Music Canada)	Gold	40,000^{‡}
^{‡} Sales+streaming figures based on certification alone.
