= Leave Me Too =

2025 single by Josh Ross

Single by Josh Ross

from the album Later Tonight
- Released: February 14, 2025
- Genre: Country rock
- Length: 3:11
- Label: The Core; Universal Canada; Mercury Nashville
- Songwriters: Allison Veltz Cruz; Laura Veltz; Michael Tyler; Ben Stennis
- Producer: Matt Geroux

Josh Ross singles chronology
"Single Again" (2024)	"Leave Me Too" (2025)	"Drunk Right Now (Na Na Na)" (2025)

Visualizer
- "Leave Me Too" on YouTube

"Leave Me Too" is a song recorded by Canadian country artist Josh Ross. The song was written by Allison Veltz Cruz, Laura Veltz, Michael Tyler, and Ben Stennis, while Matt Geroux produced it. It was the second single to Canadian radio off his debut album, Later Tonight.

== Background ==
In a press release, Ross said that the song "reflects on past relationships, acknowledging moments of being difficult to love and understanding why someone chose to walk away—because, in their shoes, you might have done the same". It marks the first single that Ross has released which he did not co-write, since he signed with Universal Music in 2022. He stated that the song "stood out" to him from the moment he first heard it.

== Live performance ==
Ross performed "Leave Me Too" live at the 2025 Juno Awards at Rogers Arena in Vancouver on March 30, 2025. His performance was broadcast live on CBC in Canada, and later uploaded to YouTube.

== Music video ==
The official visualizer for "Leave Me Too" premiered on YouTube on February 14, 2025

== Charts ==
=== Weekly charts ===
Weekly chart performance for "Leave Me Too"
Chart (2025)	Peak position
Canada (Canadian Hot 100)	58
Canada Country (Billboard)	5

=== Year-end charts ===
Year-end chart performance for "Leave Me Too"
Chart (2025)	Position
Canada Country (Billboard)	29
