= Good with Me =

Studio album by Eric Ethridge
- Released: October 30, 2020
- Genre: Country pop
- Length: 26:42
- Label: Anthem Entertainment
- Producer: Brian Howes; Jason van Poederooyen; Michael Lotten; Jimmy Thow; Lindsay Rimes; adamjosh; Kuya; Johnny Simmen; Jeffrey Garrison

Eric Ethridge chronology
Forever With You (2020)	Good with Me (2020)

Singles from Good with Me
- 1. "Dream Girl" Released: February 21, 2020; 2. "Kiss Me Goodbye" Released: August 28, 2020; 3. "Sad Songs" Released: February 12, 2021

Good with Me is the debut studio album by Canadian country music singer Eric Ethridge. It was released on October 30, 2020 through Anthem Entertainment. It includes the singles "Dream Girl". "Kiss Me Goodbye", and "Sad Songs".

== Critical reception ==
Jenna Weishar of Front Porch Music favourably reviewed the album, calling it "energetic, emotional, and fun". She highlighted the album’s first two singles, the title track, as well as "No Good Love" and "Out of My League" as tracks that stand out.

== Track listing ==
Adapted from Spotify.
No.	Title	Writer(s)	Length
1.	"Dream Girl"	Dan Smyers; Shay Mooney; Jennifer Schott; William Weatherly	3:11
2.	"Mess with Me"	Eric Ethridge; Griffen Palmer; Michael Lotten	2:45
3.	"Waves"	Ethridge; James Thow; Jason McEwan	3:26
4.	"Kiss Me Goodbye"	Ethridge; Lindsay Rimes; Matthew Rogers	2:48
5.	"Good with Me"	Lotten; John King; Tomas Clawson	2:30
6.	"Sad Songs"	Adam Josh Pondang; Andrew Pedersen; Duncan Laurence; Fraser Churchill; Robert Gerongco; Samuel Gerongco	3:05
7.	"No Good Love"	Kalsey Kulyk; Marla Morris	3:02
8.	"Out of My League"	Ethridge; Johnny Simmen; Maddy Simmen	3:01
9.	"Miss Me"	Kulyk	2:53
Total length:			26:42

== Charts ==
=== Singles ===
Year	Single	Peak positions
Year	Single	CAN Country
2020	"Dream Girl"	38
2020	"Kiss Me Goodbye"	47
2021	"Sad Songs"	—

== Release history ==
Release formats for Good with Me
Country	Date	Format	Label	Ref.
Various	October 30, 2020	Digital download	Anthem Entertainment	
Various	October 30, 2020	Streaming	Anthem Entertainment	
