= Drink Things Through =

2026 song by Josh Ross

Single by Josh Ross
- Released: September 25, 2026
- Genre: Country rock
- Length: 3:13
- Label: The Core; Universal Canada; Mercury Nashville
- Songwriters: Mitchy Collins; Chad Kroeger; Larzz Principato; Jeremy Dussolliet
- Producer: Matt Geroux

Josh Ross singles chronology
"Kicked Out of Bars" (2026)	"Drink Things Through" (2026)

Music video
- "Drink Things Through" on YouTube

"Drink Things Through" is a song recorded by Canadian country music artist Josh Ross. The song was written by Chad Kroeger, Mitchy Collins, Larzz Principato, and Jeremy Dussolliet.

== Background ==
Ross remarked that it was "special" for him to record a song written by Chad Kroeger of Nickelback, and that the song is a "blast to play live". Ross began playing the song during his live performance prior to its release.

== Critical reception ==
Chad Carlson of Today's Country Magazine favourably reviewed "Drink Things Through," stating it "takes a recognizable problem, adds a clever twist, wraps it in muscular country-rock production and gives the listener a reason to have some fun with it," opining that it "is a song meant to be felt in a crowded room". Jennifer Eggleston of Backstage Country described the song as "built for last call". An uncredited review from Artistrack opined that the song "captures that reckless, familiar impulse of trying to drown out overthinking with a cold drink and a good time, delivering a hook that sticks in your head long after the final chord fades". Krista Hamm of YourSaintJohn.ca referred to the track as "a fun, country-rock anthem".

== Music video ==
The visualizer for "Drink Things Through" was released on YouTube on September 25, 2026.

== Credits and personnel ==
Credits adapted from Apple Music.

- Mike Cervantes – mastering engineer
- Jim Cooley – mixing engineer
- Tim Galloway – acoustic guitar, electric guitar, bass guitar
- Matt Geroux – background vocals, engineering, guitar, keyboards, percussion, production, programming, recording
- Justin Gray – immersive mixing engineer
- Sol Philcox-Littlefield – electric guitar
- Jerry Roe – drums
- Josh Ross – vocals
- Justin Schipper – pedal steel guitar
- Jake Widenhofer – electric guitar
- Nick Zinnanti – editing engineer

== Charts ==
Weekly chart performance for "Drink Things Through"
Chart (2026)	Peak position
Canada Hot 100 (Billboard)	84
Canada Country (Billboard)	23
US Country Airplay (Billboard)	53
