= If You Met Me First =

2019 single by Eric Ethridge

Single by Eric Ethridge

from the EP Eric Ethridge
- Released: May 6, 2019
- Genre: Country pop
- Length: 3:13
- Label: Red Dot
- Songwriters: Jennifer Denmark; Tiffany Gross; William Tyler Graham

Eric Ethridge singles chronology
"California" (2018)	"If You Met Me First" (2019)	"Dream Girl" (2020)

Music video
- "If You Met Me First" on YouTube

"If You Met Me First" is a song recorded by Canadian country artist Eric Ethridge. The song was written by Jennifer Denmark, Tiffany Gross, and William Tyler Graham. It was the fourth single released from Ethridge's 2018 debut self-titled extended play. The song was Ethridge's first single to be released to country radio after signing a record deal with red dot.

== Background ==
Jennifer Denmark, one of the co-writers of the song, sought to analyze some of her favourite songs, beginning with Bonnie Raitt's "I Can't Make You Love Me". She stated that the raw emotion of loving someone and not being loved in return in the song was how she felt people connected with the song, and that the "only thing sadder than that would be to love someone who also loves you back and there's nothing you can do about it". This is the feeling she sought to capture when writing "If You Met Me First.

After the 2018 release of Ethridge's extended play, "If You Met Me First" achieved immense support from fans on streaming and digital music services in both Canada and the United States. Its success led to him signing a record deal with ole Management's red dot label in the United States. Ethridge celebrated the official release of the song as a single to radio at a show at The Aeolian Hall in London, Ontario in May 2019.

== Critical reception ==
Annie Reuter of Billboard described the song as a "soaring ballad", noting Ethridge's "smooth vocals" and the use of "light piano and guitar".

== Commercial performance ==
"If You Met Me First" peaked at number 42 on the Billboard Canada Country chart for the week of June 22, 2019. Despite the lack of support at radio, the song was later certified Gold by Music Canada.

== Music video ==
The official music video for "If You Met Me First" was directed by Ryan Hamblin and premiered on Billboard on May 9, 2019. It was later uploaded to YouTube the next day.

== Charts ==
Chart performance for "If You Met Me First"
Chart (2019)	Peak position
Canada Country (Billboard)	42

== Certifications ==
Region	Certification	Certified units/sales
Canada (Music Canada)	Gold	40,000^{‡}
^{‡} Sales+streaming figures based on certification alone.
