= Dream Girl (Eric Ethridge song) =

2020 single by Eric Ethridge

Single by Eric Ethridge

from the album Good with Me
- Released: February 21, 2020
- Genre: Country pop
- Length: 3:11
- Label: Anthem
- Songwriter(s): Dan Smyers; Shay Mooney; Jennifer Schott; Will Weatherly
- Producer(s): Brian Howes; Jason van Poederooyen

Eric Ethridge singles chronology
"If You Met Me First" (2019)	"Dream Girl" (2020)	"Kiss Me Goodbye" (2020)

Music video
- "Dream Girl" on YouTube

"Dream Girl" is a song recorded by Canadian country artist Eric Ethridge. The track was co-written by Dan Smyers and Shay Mooney of Dan + Shay, with Jennifer Schott and Will Weatherly. The song was the lead single off Ethridge's debut studio album Good with Me.

== Background ==
"Dream Girl" was Ethridge's debut US single, and premiered exclusively on Taste of Country. Ethridge told them:

"In the ever-evolving process of finding ways to 'stand out from the crowd,' 'Dream Girl' was the first song I’ve ever recorded that encompasses the sound I’ve been chasing all this time. It’s powerful, dynamic and it’s a great way to introduce to the world the exciting direction my music is heading in! From the moment I heard this song, I knew I had to record it. I’m a fan of Dan + Shay's writing — especially their unique melodies and phrasing. I’ve looked up to them as artists for a long time, and I’m grateful to have this song on my record!"

He told Sounds Like Nashville:

"Sonically, I think we really achieved what we were hoping to on ‘Dream Girl.’ As my first recording under Anthem Records, I wanted this song to hit hard and really show what I can do with my voice. I’m so excited with how it turned out!"

== Critical reception ==
Cillea Houghton of Taste of Country said the track "instantly hits you with a summery feeling and shimmering pop country beat. It's the kind of beat that just beckons crowds to sing along during a live show" and that Dan + Shay's "handprints are all over the song, as evidenced by the earworm melody and clever wordplay". Thomas Burns Scully of Popdust said the song "plays exceptionally well with the pop country toolkit".

Drew Pearce of Sounds Like Nashville said "The song is a sleek piece of country-pop, complete with finger-snapping verses and smooth harmonies that build up to a soaring, anthemic chorus". Country Music Tattle Tale said Ethridge's "smooth vocals perfectly enhance the messaging of a love lost".

== Music video ==
The music video for "Dream Girl" was directed by Quinton Cook, and premiered on April 25, 2020. It features Ethridge as well as several dogs, including a dog who was rescued from the Nashville tornado in 2020.

== Track listings ==
Digital download - single

1. "Dream Girl" – 3:11

Digital download - single

1. "Dream Girl" – 3:11
2. "Gasoline" – 2:49

== Chart performance ==
"Dream Girl" reached a peak of #38 on the Billboard Canada Country chart dated May 9, 2020.

Chart (2020)	Peak position
Canada Country (Billboard)	38
