= Hate How You Look =

2025 song by Josh Ross

Single by Josh Ross

from the album Later Tonight
- Released: September 8, 2025
- Genre: Country pop
- Length: 3:14
- Label: The Core; Universal Canada; Mercury Nashville
- Songwriters: Nicolas Sainato; Chris McKenna; Jessica Farren; Christian Yancey
- Producer: Matt Geroux

Josh Ross singles chronology
"Drunk Right Now (Na Na Na)" (2025)	"Hate How You Look" (2025)	"Later Tonight" (2026)

Visualizer
- "Hate How You Look" on YouTube

Lyric video
- "Hate How You Look" on YouTube

"Hate How You Look" is a song recorded by Canadian country music artist Josh Ross. The song was written by Nicolas Sainato, Chris McKenna, Jessica Farren, and Christian Yancey, while Matt Geroux produced the track. The song is the second single to US radio from his debut studio album, Later Tonight.

== Background ==
Ross remarked that upon hearing the song he "loved how energetic the song felt right away". He elected to add the song to his set list for his live shows several months ahead of its release, as he found it to be a fun song that showcased the "versatility" of his live show. Ross described the song as covering "all the emotions that you go through seeing someone move on without you". The song was shipped to U.S. country radio in August 2025 as the follow-up to Ross's number one hit "Single Again".

== Live performance ==
In July 2025, Ross performed "Hate How You Look" live on the CBC's Canada Day broadcast from Ottawa, Ontario. The performance was uploaded to YouTube the next day. In September 2025, Ross performed "Hate How You Look" at the 2025 Canadian Country Music Association Awards in Kelowna, British Columbia, with dancer Dyllan Blackburn.

== Credits and personnel ==
Credits adapted from AllMusic.

- Mike Cervantes – mastering engineer
- Jim Cooley – mixing engineer
- Tim Galloway – bass guitar, guitar
- Matt Geroux – piano, production, programming, recording
- Jerry Roe – drums
- Josh Ross – primary vocals
- Justin Schipper – steel guitar
- Jake Widenhofer – guitar

== Charts ==
Chart performance for "Hate How You Look"
Chart (2025–2026)	Peak position
Australia Country Hot 50 (The Music)	4
Canada (Canadian Hot 100)	28
Canada Country (Billboard)	1
UK Country Airplay (Radiomonitor)	1
US Billboard Hot 100	52
US Country Airplay (Billboard)	1
US Hot Country Songs (Billboard)	12

== Certifications ==
Certifications for "Hate How You Look"
Region	Certification	Certified units/sales
Canada (Music Canada)	Platinum	80,000^{‡}
^{‡} Sales+streaming figures based on certification alone.
