= First Taste of Gone =

2022 single by Josh Ross

Single by Josh Ross
- Released: February 12, 2022
- Genre: Country
- Length: 2:52
- Label: The Core; Universal Canada
- Songwriter(s): Josh Ross; Mason Thornley
- Producer(s): Matt Geroux

Josh Ross singles chronology
"If You Were a Song" (2019)	"First Taste of Gone" (2022)	"On a Different Night" (2022)

"First Taste of Gone" is a song co-written and recorded by Canadian country artist Josh Ross. He co-wrote the track with Mason Thornley, while Matt Geroux produced it. The song was initially released independently before Ross signed with The Core Entertainment and Universal Music Canada, who took over promotion of the single.

== Background ==
On a Monday night, Ross learned that his producer had become unavailable for the next two days due to contracting COVID-19. As a result, he pushed his recording session that was slated for a different song to the Thursday that week. That night, he and co-writer Mason Thornley elected to write a new song with their newfound time and decided to pursue the title "First Taste of Gone", which they had attempted to use earlier that year. They wrote the song in 45 minutes, which Ross stated was much quicker than usual for him. The lyric "you're 700 miles away, moving on, and I'm sitting here missing you" is based on the approximate distance from Ross' hometown of Waterdown, Ontario to his current residence of Nashville, Tennessee, for which Ross has an arm tattoo that reads "700 mi."

Ross co-wrote the song at a time in his life where he was "going through a lot" with many changes in his personal life. It was inspired by a moment where Ross realized that a past relationship would not work out, to which Thornley slid a drink to Ross across a table at a bar and said "here's your first taste of gone". He cited thinking of "that moment where you have to go out again without that person," and having a "weird feeling" thinking "'well, I don’t have to call someone when I go home tonight' or 'she's not going to be there.'" On social media platform TikTok, he revealed that the song was inspired by a girl he was previously with, and the moment he realized she was not coming back. He stated that he felt the song showcased a different side of him, "emotionally and vocally", to his listeners.

== Critical reception ==
Erica Zisman of CountrySwag favourably reviewed "First Taste of Gone", calling it a "heartbreaker" that "depicts the feelings we all go through when we finally get to the point, where a relationship is truly over". She described it as Ross' first "true ballad," adding that it "has everything a song needs to stand the test of time," and "fans would fall in love with [it]". Jenna Weishar of Front Porch Music stated that the track "captures the heartbreak element", positively noting that it could have taken a bigger instrumental angle, but instead, "the broken down simplicity of the piano and raw vocal just drives the story so thoughtfully". Nick Tressler of Raised Rowdy stated that the song could provide the listener "a little reprieve from some pain you felt in your life," adding that "lost love in any form can be extremely tough to deal with, but with a song like this you can find a way to start to find that closure and end to the pain".

== Commercial performance ==
"First Taste of Gone" debuted at number 48 on the Billboard Canada Country chart for the week of March 12, 2022, marking Ross's first charting radio single. It later peaked at number five for the week of July 30, 2022, after 21 weeks on the chart. The song also peaked at number 54 on the all-genre Canadian Hot 100 for the same week, after initially debuting two weeks prior at number 72. It has been certified Platinum by Music Canada.

== Accolades ==
Year	Association	Category	Result	Ref
2023	Country Music Association of Ontario	Single of the Year	Nominated	

== Credits and personnel ==
Credits adapted from AllMusic.

- Matt Geroux – mixing, production, programming, recording
- Kevin Post – guitar
- Josh Ross – composition, primary vocals
- Ben Schuller – keyboards
- Dan Shike – master engineering
- Mason Thornley – composition

== Music video ==
Ross filmed a live performance video of "First Taste of Gone" for the SiriusXM "Top of the Country" contest which premiered on August 31, 2022.

== Charts ==
Chart performance for "First Taste of Gone"
Chart (2022)	Peak position
Canada (Canadian Hot 100)	54
Canada Country (Billboard)	5

== Certifications ==
Region	Certification	Certified units/sales
Canada (Music Canada)	Platinum	80,000^{‡}
^{‡} Sales+streaming figures based on certification alone.
