= Scared of Getting Sober =

2026 single by Josh Ross

Single by Josh Ross

from the album Later Tonight
- Released: February 23, 2026
- Genre: Country
- Length: 3:01
- Label: The Core; Universal Canada
- Songwriters: Josh Ross; Joe Fox; Seth Ennis; Mason Thornley; Heath Warren
- Producer: Matt Geroux

Josh Ross singles chronology
"Later Tonight" (2026)	"Scared of Getting Sober" (2026)	"Kicked Out of Bars" (2026)

Music video
- "Scared of Getting Sober" on YouTube

"Scared of Getting Sober" is a song recorded by Canadian country music artist Josh Ross. He wrote the song with Joe Fox, Seth Ennis, Mason Thornley, and Heath Warren. It was the fourth and final single released to Canadian country radio from Ross' debut album Later Tonight.

== Background ==
Ross described "Scared of Getting Sober" as "an honest song about the struggles of drinking and the lifestyle that I live". He added that "a lot of people would think once you stop is when you would feel better. For me, it was the opposite, because that’s when I lived with my actual thoughts versus being able to mask how I felt".

== Music video ==
The visualizer for "Scared of Getting Sober" was released on YouTube on September 18, 2025, as part of the Later Tonight album rollout. Ross released a music video on May 7, 2026. One week later, he released a lyric video for the song.

== Credits and personnel ==
Credits adapted from Apple Music.

- Drew Bollman – recording engineer
- Mike Cervantes – mastering engineer
- Tim Galloway – acoustic guitar
- Matt Geroux – keyboards, production, programming
- Justin Gray – immersive mixing engineer
- Jerry Roe – drums
- Josh Ross – vocals
- Justin Schipper – steel guitar
- Jimmie Lee Sloas – bass guitar
- Derek Wells – electric guitar
- Doug Weier – mixing engineer
- Jake Widenhofer – electric guitar
- Alex Wright – keyboards, piano

== Charts ==
Weekly chart performance for "Scared of Getting Sober"
Chart (2026)	Peak position
Canada (Canadian Hot 100)	89
Canada Country (Billboard)	4
