= Get to Drinkin' =

2026 single by Zach John King

Single by Zach John King

from the album I'm What You Get
- Released: February 6, 2026
- Genre: Country
- Length: 2:48
- Label: Sony
- Songwriters: Zach John King; Rhett Akins; Thomas Archer; Kyle Fishman; Kyle Sturrock
- Producers: Zach John King; Ryan Wilson

Music video
- "Get to Drinkin'" on YouTube

"Get to Drinkin'" is a song by American country music singer Zach John King. It was released on February 6, 2026 as the lead single from his debut studio album I'm What You Get. King wrote the song with Rhett Akins, Thomas Archer, Kyle Fishman and Kyle Sturrock, and produced it with Ryan Wilson.

== Background and composition ==
King wrote the song on the last day of a writing retreat in December 2025, outside of Nashville. In the song, the narrator believes he has fully moved on from a breakup, but remembers the good times of his relationship whenever he drinks whiskey. He hopes that his ex misses him and wants him back, but in reality it is wishful thinking.

== Charts ==
Chart performance
Chart (2026)	Peak position
Canada Hot 100 (Billboard)	65
Canada Country (Billboard)	6
US Billboard Hot 100	53
US Country Airplay (Billboard)	1
US Hot Country Songs (Billboard)	14
