= Just Being Me =

2026 single by Morgan Griffiths

Single by Morgan Griffiths
- Released: January 30, 2026
- Genre: Country
- Length: 2:57
- Label: Independent
- Songwriters: Morgan Griffiths; Simon Clow; Ryan Stead
- Producers: Dan Botch; Garrett Ward

Morgan Griffiths singles chronology
"Southern Withdrawal" (2025)	"Just Being Me" (2026)	"Boondocks" (2026)

Lyric video
- "Just Being Me" on YouTube

"Just Being Me" is a song recorded by Canadian country music artist Morgan Griffiths. He wrote the song with Simon Clow and Ryan Stead, while it was produced by The Renaissance, a duo composed of Garrett Ward and Dan Botch. The song marked Griffiths' second career top ten hit at Canadian country radio.

== Critical reception ==
Top Country named "Just Being Me" one of their Top 10 Canadian Country Songs for Summer 2026. They framed the song as an "upbeat, confident track about embracing authenticity and staying true to yourself," adding that it "captures the fresh energy behind Morgan Griffiths, an emerging voice bringing a modern perspective to Canadian country."

== Commercial performance ==
The song debuted on the all-genre Canadian Hot 100 at number 92 for the week of July 11, 2026. The following week, it rose to a peak of number 88, and also peaked at number six on the Canada Country chart.

== Credits and personnel ==
Credits adapted from Apple Music.

- Dan Botch – background vocals, acoustic guitar, bass, banjo, production
- Mike Cervantes – mastering engineer
- Morgan Griffiths – vocals
- David Roberto – drums
- Garrett Ward – mixing engineer, percussion, production

== Charts ==
=== Weekly charts ===
Weekly chart performance for "Just Being Me"
Chart (2026)	Peak position
Canada (Canadian Hot 100)	88
Canada Country (Billboard)	6
