= Match for My Memory =

2023 single by Robyn Ottolini

Single by Robyn Ottolini
- Released: April 28, 2023 (Note: The track was released to Canadian country radio formats on May 15, 2023.)
- Genre: Country
- Length: 2:59
- Label: Aleu; Frontside; Empire
- Songwriter(s): Robyn Ottolini; Emily Reid
- Producer(s): Erik Fintelman; Mark Schroor

Robyn Ottolini singles chronology
"Trust Issues" (2022)	"Match for My Memory" (2023)	"I Kissed Your Boyfriend" (2024)

Music video
- "Match for My Memory" on YouTube

Alternate cover

"Match for My Memory" is a song recorded by Canadian country music artist Robyn Ottolini. She co-wrote the song with Emily Reid, while Erik Fintelman and Mark Schroor produced the track. The song marked the first release for Ottolini after signing a distribution deal with Empire Distribution.

== Background and release ==
Ottolini wrote "Match for My Memory" in Toronto, Ontario, with her frequent collaborator and friend Emily Reid. She stated that she was inspired by the quote "Her memory is no match for distance", which she told Reid about, prompting them to write the song. As the first track in a new "chapter" of her career, Ottolini stated that the track "definitely lights up the upcoming music and allows me to feel self-assured in a way".

Ottolini exclusively premiered "Match for My Memory" on Taste of Country on October 27, 2023. She described the song as "really important because when you go through a breakup, it can be easy to think that you're not worth anything or you're easily forgettable," and that the song is about saying "'I am amazing. I am the best of the best. And forgetting me is going to be very difficult for you'".

== Critical reception ==
John R. Kennedy of iHeartRadio described the song as "a striking new track about moving on with confidence after a breakup". An uncredited review from Front Porch Music stated that the track "is a powerful and moving single that showcases Robyn's talent as a singer and songwriter". Chad Carlson of Today's Country Magazine favourably reviewed "Match for My Memory", opining that the song "will hit close to home for many, as over time, most of us have endured a relationship that had a bitter ending".

== Accolades ==
Year	Association	Category	Result	Ref
2024	Country Music Association of Ontario	Single of the Year	Nominated	

== Music video ==
The official music video for "Match for My Memory" premiered on People on June 20, 2023. It was later uploaded to YouTube the next day. The video was directed by Connor Scheffler and filmed in Ontario. Ottolini stated that the growing fire in the video is "kind of symbolic. As the memory grows, it gets bigger and bigger until you try to put it out and you try to get in the water, but it simply just won't go away. It all starts with one small flame and then all of a sudden, you can't escape a memory".

== Track listings ==
Digital download – single

1. "Match for My Memory" – 2:59

Digital download – single

1. "Match for My Memory (Not Burning Out)" – 3:05
2. "Match for My Memory" – 2:59

Digital download – single

1. "Match for My Memory (Fired Up)" – 3:05
2. "Match for My Memory (Not Burning Out)" – 3:05
3. "Match for My Memory" – 2:59

== Charts ==
Chart performance for "Match for My Memory"
Chart (2023)	Peak position
Canada Country (Billboard)	22
