= F-150 (song) =

2020 single by Robyn Ottolini

Single by Robyn Ottolini

from the EP The I'm Not Always Hilarious EP
- Released: January 31, 2020 (Note: The track was released to country radio formats on February 16, 2021.)
- Genre: Country
- Length: 2:48
- Label: Warner Nashville; Warner Records
- Songwriters: Robyn Ottolini; Erik Fintelman; Mark Schroor
- Producers: Erik Fintelman; Mark Schroor

Robyn Ottolini singles chronology
"Open Doors & Fairy Tales" (2014)	"F-150" (2020)	"Tell You Everything" (2021)

Music video
- "F-150" on YouTube

Alternative cover

"F-150" is a song co-written and recorded by Canadian country artist Robyn Ottolini. The track was co-written with Erik Fintelman and Mark Schroor, who also co-produced the track. After achieving viral success on the media platform TikTok, "F-150" became Ottolini's debut single on Warner Music Nashville to country radio formats in the United States and Canada.

== Background ==
"F-150" was originally released in January 2020, and was later included on her independent release The I'm Not Always Hilarious EP. Ottolini described the meaning of the song:

"My ex drove an F-150 and I f’ing hate that truck... It’s about trying to move on and get strong, until you see that one thing that brings you back to the pain. Nothing does that more for me than his white, Ford F-150. This song is a piece of my heart and soul. It’s a true story of personal heartbreak and self-growth."

The song began to gain traction on TikTok in the Fall of 2020 and reached #3 on the Rolling Stone Trending 25 in the United States. This led to her signing with Warner Music Nashville in October 2020.

== Critical reception ==
Billy Dukes of Taste of Country called "F-150" an "emotionally satisfying earworm" with "radio-friendly appeal". Chet Daniels of 99.9 WJVL called the song a "standout track", while Complete Country said "The song has a relatable message to those trying to get over someone, and the catchy lyrics and chorus make it hard to get out of your head."

== Accolades ==
Year	Association	Category	Result	Ref
2021	Country Music Association of Ontario	Songwriter(s) of the Year	Nominated	
2021	Country Music Association of Ontario	Single of the Year	Nominated	
2022	Country Music Association of Ontario	Music Video of the Year	Won	

== Commercial performance ==
"F-150" reached a peak of number eight on the Billboard Canada Country chart, and #65 on the Canadian Hot 100, marking Ottolini's first entry on both charts. It is also Ottolini's first single to be certified Gold by Music Canada and was later certified Platinum. In the United States, "F-150" debuted at number 59 on the Country Airplay chart.

== Music video ==
The music video for "F-150" was directed by Ben Knechtel, and premiered on December 4, 2020.

== Charts ==
Chart performance for "F-150"
Chart (2020–2021)	Peak position
Canada (Canadian Hot 100)	65
Canada Country (Billboard)	8
US Country Airplay (Billboard)	59

== Certifications ==
Region	Certification	Certified units/sales
Canada (Music Canada)	Platinum	80,000^{‡}
^{‡} Sales+streaming figures based on certification alone.
