= Ain't Doin' Jack =

2023 single by Josh Ross

Single by Josh Ross
- Released: July 14, 2023
- Genre: Country rock
- Length: 2:40
- Label: The Core; Universal Canada
- Songwriter(s): Josh Ross; Mason Thornley; Benjamin Stoll; Sam Martinez
- Producer(s): Matt Geroux

Josh Ross singles chronology
"Trouble" (2023)	"Ain't Doin' Jack" (2023)	"Single Again" (2024)

Music video
- "Ain't Doin' Jack" on YouTube

"Ain't Doin' Jack" is a song co-written and recorded by Canadian country artist Josh Ross. He co-wrote the track with Mason Thornley, Benjamin Stoll, and Sam Martinez, while Matt Geroux produced it. The song was officially sent to Canadian country radio in November 2023. The song reached number one on the Mediabase Canada Country chart.

== Background ==
Ross and his fellow songwriters Mason Thornley, Ben Stoll, and Sam Martinez were on a writing retreat in the Smoky Mountains when they wrote "Ain't Doin' Jack". Stoll had the idea of a song where drinking Jack Daniel's whisky was "not doing the trick to get over the girl" after a break up. The four writers initially envisioned the song as a ballad, but during the trip, Ross received news that he would be an opening act on Nickelback's Get Rollin' Tour. This prompted them to reimagine the song as a country rock song that would fit into his live show better.

== Critical reception ==
Lesley Janes of The Nash News favourably reviewed the track, stating that the "lyrics are just as easy to gravitate to as the production behind the track", while adding that there is"something about the way Ross sings about going through heartbreak that makes it feel believable". She noted influence of early 2000s rock music and modern country music in the song. Gabby Shukin of CJVR FM called the song "perfect for summer time" and "very catchy", while she also noted the influence of rock music. Jeffrey Kurtis of Today's Country Magazine described the song as "purely built for a live show experience, providing several sing-along and fist pumping moments that wrap around the proper amounts of energy that carry an unmistakable, mosh pit type of build". Bee Delores of Countrypolitan positively reviewed the track, opining that "Ross's raspy vocals give the song even greater emotional weight".

== Music video ==
The official music video for "Ain't Doin' Jack" premiered on YouTube on August 7, 2023.

== Credits and personnel ==
Credits adapted from AllMusic.

- Jim Cooley – mixing
- Tim Galloway – bass guitar, guitar
- Matt Geroux – drums, keyboard, production, programming, recording
- Sol Littlefield – guitar
- Sam Martinez – composition
- Andrew Mendelson – master engineering
- Josh Ross – composition, primary vocals
- Justin Schipper – guitar
- Benjamin Stoll – composition
- Mason Thornley – composition
- Jake Widenhofer – guitar

== Charts ==
Chart performance for "Ain't Doin' Jack"
Chart (2023–2024)	Peak position
Australia Country Hot 50 (The Music)	26
Canada (Canadian Hot 100)	69
Canada Country (Billboard)	2

== Certifications ==
Region	Certification	Certified units/sales
Canada (Music Canada)	Platinum	80,000^{‡}
^{‡} Sales+streaming figures based on certification alone.
