= Complicated (EP) =

2024 extended play by Josh Ross

EP by Josh Ross
- Released: March 29, 2024
- Studio: Matt Geroux Recording (Hendersonville, Tennessee)
- Genre: Country
- Length: 24:34
- Label: The Core; Universal Canada; Mercury Nashville
- Producer: Matt Geroux

Josh Ross chronology
Live Sessions (2022)	Complicated (2024)	Later Tonight (2025)

Singles from Complicated
- 1. "Trouble" Released: June 12, 2023; 2. "Single Again" Released: March 11, 2024

Complicated is the second EP by Canadian country music artist Josh Ross. It was released on March 29, 2024, and is his debut project to be released by The Core Entertainment and Universal Music Canada, in partnership with UMG Nashville's Mercury Nashville imprint. The EP was produced by Matt Geroux, and includes the singles "Trouble" and "Single Again", as well as the promotional singles "Truck Girl" and "Matching Tattoos".

== Background ==
Ross described Complicated as "a body of work that showcases lyrically who I am as a person, and me sonically as a creative". He noted that he is "drawn to different sounds and production depending on what the emotion of the song calls for" and that the EP represents who he is "becoming as an artist". Ross co-wrote every track on the EP, with the exception of "Tell Me a Lie".

== Critical reception ==
Rachel Goodman of Now Toronto described the EP as "a curated compilation of traditional sounding country and songs that are more up tempo". An uncredited article from Culture Fix stated that Ross "is cemented as a storyteller with a mastery of the country-rock sound" on this EP.

== Track listing ==
Complicated track listing
No.	Title	Writer(s)	Length
1.	"Single Again"	Josh Ross; Joe Fox; Brad Rempel	2:59
2.	"Tell Me a Lie"	Cameron Bedell; Lauren McLamb; Johnny Clawson	3:27
3.	"Truck Girl"	Ross; Mason Thornley; Johnny Gates; Jared Griffin	3:07
4.	"Complicated"	Ross; Thornley; Matt Geroux; Heath Warren	2:57
5.	"She Don't Smoke"	Ross; Fox; Rempel; Thornley	2:46
6.	"Trouble"	Ross; Thornley	3:34
7.	"Burn Back"	Ross; Thornley; Sam Martinez; Benjamin Stoll	2:44
8.	"Matching Tattoos"	Ross; Fox; Thornley; Rempel	3:00
Total length:			24:34

== Personnel ==
Credits adapted from Tidal.

- Josh Ross – vocals (all tracks), background vocals (tracks 2, 4, 5, 7)
- Matt Geroux – programming, production, engineering (all tracks); drums (1–4, 6), piano (2–5, 7, 8), guitar (3), background vocals (4), keyboards (6)
- Jim Cooley – mixing (1, 3–5, 8)
- Austin Shawn – mixing (2)
- Doug Weier – mixing (6)
- John Nathaniel – mixing (7)
- Mike Cervantes – mastering (1–5, 7, 8)
- Dan Shike – mastering (6)
- Tim Galloway – guitar (all tracks), bass guitar (1–4, 6, 8)
- Jake Widenhofer – guitar
- Solomon Philcox – guitar (1)
- Justin Schipper – steel guitar (2–5, 7, 8), guitar (6)
- Joe Fox – bass guitar, guitar (5)
- Alex Wright – piano (8)

== Charts ==
Chart performance for Complicated
Chart (2024)	Peak position
Canadian Albums (Billboard)	73
US Heatseekers Albums (Billboard)	11

=== Singles ===
Chart performance for singles from Complicated
Year	Single	Peak chart positions						Certifications
Year	Single	CAN	CAN Country	AUS Country	US	US Country	US Country Airplay	Certifications
2023	"Trouble"	48	1	17	— (Note: "Trouble" did not enter the Hot 100, but peaked at number 39 on the US Digital Songs component chart.)	43	—	MC: 2× Platinum; RIAA: Gold
2024	"Single Again"	60	2	4	73	22	2	MC: 2× Platinum
"—" denotes releases that did not chart.

== Certifications ==
Region	Certification	Certified units/sales
Canada (Music Canada)	Gold	40,000^{‡}
^{‡} Sales+streaming figures based on certification alone.

== Awards and nominations ==
Year	Association	Category	Nominated work	Result	Ref
2023	Canadian Country Music Association	Songwriter(s) of the Year	"Trouble"	Nominated	
2023	Canadian Country Music Association	Video of the Year"	"Trouble"	Nominated	
2024	Country Music Association of Ontario	Music Video of the Year	"Trouble"	Nominated	
2024	Country Music Association of Ontario	Single of the Year	"Trouble"	Nominated	
2024	Canadian Country Music Association	Album of the Year	Complicated	Nominated	
2024	Canadian Country Music Association	Single of the Year	"Trouble"	Won	
2024	Canadian Country Music Association	Top Selling Canadian Album of the Year	Complicated	Won	
2024	Canadian Country Music Association	Top Selling Canadian Single of the Year	"Trouble"	Won	
2025	Juno Awards	Album of the Year	Complicated	Nominated	
2025	Juno Awards	Country Album of the Year	Complicated	Won	
2025	Juno Awards	Single of the Year	"Single Again"	Nominated	
2025	Canadian Country Music Association	Single of the Year	"Single Again"	Won	
2025	Canadian Country Music Association	Top Selling Canadian Album of the Year	Complicated	Won	
2025	Canadian Country Music Association	Top Selling Canadian Single of the Year	"Single Again"	Won	
2025	Canadian Country Music Association	Video of the Year	"Single Again"	Won	
