= Bourbon (Morgan Griffiths song) =

2025 single by Morgan Griffiths

Single by Morgan Griffiths
- Released: March 7, 2025
- Genre: Country
- Length: 3:44
- Label: Independent
- Songwriters: Morgan Griffiths; Dan Botch; Garrett Ward
- Producers: Dan Botch; Garrett Ward

Morgan Griffiths singles chronology
"Bourbon" (2025)	"Southern Withdrawal" (2025)

Music video
- "Bourbon" on YouTube

"Bourbon" is a song recorded by Canadian country music artist Morgan Griffiths. Griffiths wrote the song with the production duo The Renaissance, composed of Garrett Ward and Dan Botch. It marked Griffiths' debut single to be released to Canadian radio.

== Critical reception ==
Rosie Long Decter of Billboard Canada described "Bourbon" as a "classic-themed lovelorn tune" and opined that it "shows off a slight growl in Griffiths' vocal and wouldn't be out of place on a playlist alongside breakout Canadian stars Josh Ross and Owen Riegling". She added that the song "could be an early sign of hits to come".

== Commercial performance ==
"Bourbon" debuted at #36 on the Billboard Canada Country chart for the week of March 15, 2025, marking the highest debut of any song that week. It reached a peak of number four during the week of July 19, 2025, after nineteen weeks on the chart. The also song entered the all-genre Canadian Hot 100 at #99 for the week of August 16, 2025.

== Music video ==
The official music video for "Bourbon" was directed and filmed by Dessmin Sidhu and premiered on YouTube on March 31, 2025. Griffiths also released an official studio video for "Bourbon" on March 1, 2025.

== Charts ==
=== Weekly charts ===
Weekly chart performance for "Bourbon"
Chart (2025)	Peak position
Canada (Canadian Hot 100)	99
Canada Country (Billboard)	4

=== Year-end charts ===
Year-end chart performance for "Bourbon"
Chart (2025)	Position
Canada Country (Billboard)	14
