= Later Tonight =

2025 album by Josh Ross

Studio album by Josh Ross
- Released: September 19, 2025
- Studios: Matt Geroux Recording (Hendersonville); Front Stage (Nashville); 80A (Toronto); Blackbird Studio D (Berry Hill)
- Genre: Country
- Length: 45:23
- Labels: The Core; Universal Canada; Mercury Nashville; MCA
- Producer: Matt Geroux

Josh Ross chronology
Complicated (2024)	Later Tonight (2025)

Singles from Later Tonight
- 1. "Single Again" Released: February 20, 2024; 2. "Leave Me Too" Released: February 14, 2025; 3. "Drunk Right Now (Na Na Na)" Released: May 28, 2025; 4. "Hate How You Look" Released: September 8, 2025; 5. "Later Tonight" Released: February 2, 2026; 6. "Scared of Getting Sober" Released: February 23, 2026

Later Tonight is the debut studio album by Canadian country music artist Josh Ross. It was produced by Matt Geroux, and released on September 19, 2025, via Core Records, Universal Music Canada, and Mercury Nashville. The album includes the singles "Single Again", "Leave Me Too", "Drunk Right Now (Na Na Na)", "Hate How You Look", and "Scared of Getting Sober". Ross supported the album with his headling "Later Tonight Tour" across Canada in early 2026.

== Background and promotion ==
Ross described the title track "Later Tonight" as the "thread that tied the project together". Ross co-wrote seven of the fifteen tracks on the album. He framed the writing and song selection process for the album as "leaning into getting caught in your feelings, breaking up, [and] making up". Ross stated the album's sound influences go "from rock to rap to country to piano, singer-songwriter", which he stated is "cohesive with who I am as a person". He told Range Magazine that the album has "tons" of personal inspiration and "speaks to things that have happened and are happening in my life currently", adding that it contains some of his "first 'life' style songs". Ross stated that "Nobody From Nowhere,” “Scared of Getting Sober,” and “Songs You Gave Me" were the most personal songs and most natural to write, but also noted that the concept of "My Side of Town" was very personal to him, even though he did not write it. Ross credited producer Matt Geroux for understanding him, and noted how the two "push each other to get better with each song". Ross marked the release of the album with a full day of performances and appearances in Nashville, including at the Grand Ole Opry.

== Critical reception ==
Emma Jordan of Entertainment Focus favourably reviewed Later Tonight, calling it an "anthemic-leaning catalogue" and an "instant classic jam that’s perfect for tailgate parties, festival fields and football stadium floodlights". She noted the strength of Ross's songwriting on tracks such as "Single Again", "Whiskey You", and "Songs You Gave Me", and said she would like to "see more of his songwriting" on his next album. An uncredited review from All Country News stated that with the album, Ross "plants his flag firmly in the ground" as "one of the strongest new voices in country". Nicole Piering of Country Swag favourably reviewed the album, calling it "wholly authentic to [Ross's] voice and perspective". She opined that the songs "feel both deeply personal and universally relatable" and expressed that Ross's voice is "equal parts emotive and rugged".

== Track listing ==
Later Tonight
No.	Title	Writer(s)	Length
1.	"Later Tonight"	Alexander Izquierdo; Ryan Vojtesak; John Byron; Ashley Gorley	2:42
2.	"Hate How You Look"	Nicholas Sainato; Chris McKenna; Jessica Farren; Christian Yancey	3:14
3.	"My Side of Town"	Jimmy Robbins; Seth Ennis; Josh Miller; Abram Dean	2:42
4.	"Smith & Wesson"	Ben Stennis; Michael Tyler	2:36
5.	"Leave Me Too"	Stennis; Tyler; Laura Veltz; Allison Veltz-Cruz	3:11
6.	"Half Lit"	Tyler; Miller; Will Bundy; John Morgan	2:48
7.	"Mad at Me"	Robbins; Kyle Fishman; Travis Wood; Casey Brown	3:06
8.	"Break My Heart In Two"	Josh Ross; Mason Thornley	3:50
9.	"Whiskey You"	Ross; Thornley; Ennis; Matt Geroux; Jacob Hackworth; Heath Warren; Brad Rempel; Joe Fox	2:26
10.	"Single Again"	Ross; Fox; Rempel	2:59
11.	"Songs You Gave Me"	Ross; Thornley; Geroux	2:44
12.	"Namin' Names"	Geoff Warburton; Michael Lotten; Ryan Hurd; Jesse Fink	2:43
13.	"Drunk Right Now (Na Na Na)" (with Akon)	Ross; Aliaune Thiam; Jorrit ter Braak; Maurice Huismans; Giorgio Tuinfort; Edgar Robin Albers; Johannes Dieter Kranenburg; Michel Rozenbroek; Grady Block; Brett Tyler	3:18
14.	"Nobody from Nowhere"	Ross; Geroux; Rempel; Hackworth; Warren	3:29
15.	"Scared of Getting Sober"	Ross; Fox; Ennis; Thornley; Warren	3:30
Total length:			45:23

== Personnel ==
Credits adapted from the album's liner notes and Tidal.

- Josh Ross – lead vocals, background vocals
- Matt Geroux – programming, production, engineering (all tracks); piano (tracks 2, 5), keyboards (3, 4, 6–9, 11–15)
- Drew Bollman – engineering (3, 4, 6–9, 12, 14, 15)
- Chris VanOverberghe – engineering assistance
- John Nathaniel – mixing (1, 3–9, 12–14)
- Jim Cooley – mixing (2, 10)
- Doug Weier – mixing (11, 15)
- Mike Cervantes – mastering
- Tim Galloway – bass guitar (1, 2, 5, 8, 10), acoustic guitar (1, 3, 4, 6–9, 12–15), electric guitar (1, 3, 8, 9, 13), Dobro guitar (1, 13), guitar (2, 5, 10)
- Jake Widenhofer – electric guitar (1, 3, 4, 6, 8, 9, 11–15), guitar (2, 5, 10)
- Soloman Philcox – guitar (10)
- Derek Wells – electric guitar (3, 4, 6, 8, 9, 12, 14, 15)
- Justin Schipper – steel guitar (2–9, 11–15)
- Alex Wright – keyboards (3, 4, 6–9, 12, 14, 15), piano (15)
- Jimmie Lee Sloas – bass guitar (3, 4, 6, 7, 9, 12, 14, 15)
- Jerry Roe – drums (2–4, 6, 8, 9, 12, 14, 15)
- Jonny Fung – electric guitar (3, 8)
- Ben Schuller – piano (5, 11)
- Julia Robert – creative direction
- Josh Robert – creative direction
- Alex Rodriguez – design
- Lance Wilson – photography
- Nick Leonard – photography

== Charts ==
Chart performance for Later Tonight
Chart (2025)	Peak position
Canadian Albums (Billboard)	17

=== Singles ===
Year	Title	Peak chart positions							Certifications
Year	Title	AUS Country	CAN	CAN Country	UK Country	US	US Country	US Country Airplay	Certifications
2024	"Single Again"	4	60	1	4	73	22	2	MC: 2× Platinum; RIAA: Gold
2025	"Leave Me Too"	—	58	5	—	—	—	—	
2025	"Drunk Right Now (Na Na Na)" (with Akon)	7	67	—	—	—	—	—	MC: Gold
2025	"Hate How You Look"	4	28	1	1	89	27	16	MC: Platinum
2026	"Later Tonight"	9	—	—	—	—	—	—	
2026	"Scared of Getting Sober"	—	89	4	—	—	—	—	
"—" denotes releases that did not chart or were not released to that territory.

== Certifications ==
Region	Certification	Certified units/sales
Canada (Music Canada)	Gold	40,000^{‡}
^{‡} Sales+streaming figures based on certification alone.

== Release history ==
Release formats for Later Tonight
Country	Date	Format	Label	Ref.
Various	September 19, 2025	CD	Core / Universal Canada / MCA	
Various	September 19, 2025	LP record	Core / Universal Canada / MCA	
Various	September 19, 2025	Digital download	Core / Universal Canada / MCA	
Various	September 19, 2025	Streaming	Core / Universal Canada / MCA	
