= Morgan Griffiths =

Canadian country music singer and songwriter

- Born: Abbotsford, British Columbia, Canada
- Genre: Country
- Occupations: Singer, songwriter
- Instruments: Guitar, vocals
- Years active: 2024-present
- Label: Independent
- Website: Official website

Morgan Griffiths is a Canadian country music singer-songwriter from Abbotsford, British Columbia. He has two top ten singles, "Bourbon" and "Just Being Me", on the Billboard Canada Country chart.

== Biography ==
Griffiths grew up in British Columbia, but his parents and their families are from Newfoundland. He was raised in a musical household: his father plays the accordion, his mother plays the fiddle, his brother plays the guitar and sings, and his sister plays the drums. Griffiths first began playing the guitar at age ten, and started songwriting at a later age. Prior to pursuing a career in music, he worked as an installer of kitchen cabinets and as a salesman of semi-truck parts and powder-coating metal.

In 2024, Griffiths released the tracks "Never Leaves" and "I Think I Still Love You". In 2025, he released his debut radio single "Bourbon", which became his first charting entry on the Canada Country chart. "Bourbon" went on to peak at number four on that chart, and entered the all-genre Canadian Hot 100. Griffiths followed that up with the release of the single "Southern Withdrawal". In January 2026, Griffiths released the single "Just Being Me". He is a finalist in the 2026 SiriusXM Top of the Country contest.

== Discography ==
=== Singles ===
Title	Year	Peak chart positions		Album
Title	Year	CAN	CAN Country	Album
"Bourbon"	2025	99	4	TBA
"Southern Withdrawal"	2025	—	—	TBA
"Just Being Me"	2026	88	6	TBA
"Boondocks"	2026	—	27	TBA

=== Music videos ===
Title	Year	Director
"Bourbon"	2025	Dessmin Sidhu
