= Drunk Right Now (Na Na Na) =

2025 single by Josh Ross and Akon

Single by Josh Ross and Akon

from the album Later Tonight
- Released: May 28, 2025
- Recorded: 2024
- Genre: Country pop
- Length: 3:11
- Label: The Core; Universal Canada; Mercury Nashville
- Songwriters: Josh Ross; Aliaune Thiam; Jorrit ter Braak; Maurice Huismans; Giorgio Tuinfort; Edgar Robin Albers; Johannes Dieter Kranenburg; Michel Rozenbroek; Grady Block; Brett Tyler
- Producer: Matt Geroux

Josh Ross singles chronology
| "Leave Me Too" (2025) | "Drunk Right Now (Na Na Na)" (2025) | "Hate How You Look" (2025) |

Akon singles chronology
| "Never Really Mattered" (2025) | "Drunk Right Now (Na Na Na)" (2025) | "Ghetto Livin" (2025) |

Music video
- "Drunk Right Now (Na Na Na)" on YouTube

"Drunk Right Now (Na Na Na)" is a song recorded by Canadian country artist Josh Ross and American hip hop artist Akon. It is a reimagining of Akon's 2008 song "Right Now (Na Na Na)". It is the second single to Australian radio off Ross's debut album, Later Tonight. The original songwriters were credited along with Ross, Grady Block, and Brett Tyler, while Matt Geroux produced the track.

== Background ==
Ross stated that he often heard Akon's music growing up, as his two older siblings frequently played it at home. In 2024, Ross decided to "reimagine" Akon's song "Right Now" for fun in the studio, and initially began to play recordings of it before his live shows. After receiving positive reactions from crowds, Ross managed to send the song to Akon, who liked it and asked him to collaborate on it.

== Critical reception ==
Bryson "Boom" Paul of Hot New Hip Hop positively referred to the song as "pure heat" and a "cross-genre anthem made for wild nights and loud speakers". Jennifer Eggleston of Backstage Country opined that "Drunk Right Now (Na Na Na)" is "not just a remix that evokes reminiscence; it's a summer-themed crossover that unites multiple generations of music fans with feelings of nostalgia".

== Music video ==
The official music video for "Drunk Right Now (Na Na Na)" was directed by Mattias Russo-Larsson and Lewis Atallah and produced by the group "Coming of Age". It premiered on YouTube on June 18, 2025

== Credits and personnel ==
Credits adapted from AllMusic.

- Akon – primary vocals
- Mike Cervantes – master engineering
- Tim Galloway – acoustic guitar, dobro, electric guitar
- Matt Geroux – engineering, keyboard, production, program engineering
- John Nathaniel – mixing engineering
- Josh Ross – primary vocals
- Justin Schipper – steel guitar
- Jake Widenhofer – electric guitar

== Charts ==
Chart performance for "Drunk Right Now (Na Na Na)"
| Chart (2025) | Peak position |
|---|---|
| Australia Country Hot 50 (The Music) | 7 |
| Canada Hot 100 (Billboard) | 67 |

== Certifications ==
Certifications for "Drunk Right Now (Na Na Na)"
| Region | Certification | Certified units/sales |
|---|---|---|
| Canada (Music Canada) | Gold | 40,000^{‡} |
^{‡} Sales+streaming figures based on certification alone.
