= Trouble (Josh Ross song) =

2023 single by Josh Ross

Single by Josh Ross

from the EP Complicated
- Released: January 4, 2023
- Genre: Country
- Length: 3:34
- Label: The Core; Universal Canada; Mercury Nashville
- Songwriters: Josh Ross; Mason Thornley
- Producer: Matt Geroux

Josh Ross singles chronology
"On a Different Night" (2022)	"Trouble" (2023)	"Ain't Doin' Jack" (2023)

Music video
- "Trouble" on YouTube

"Trouble" is a song co-written and recorded by Canadian country music artist Josh Ross. He wrote the song with Mason Thornley, while Matt Geroux produced the track. It is Ross' first song to have charted on a Billboard chart in the United States and his first single to be released to American country radio. It also became his first song to hit number one on the Canada Country chart. The song is the lead single from Ross' 2024 extended play Complicated.

== Background ==
"Trouble" is based on Ross's real life experience and emotions following a past break up. Ross's friend and frequent collaborator Mason Thornley had suggested the title "Trouble" and the "vibe" of the song, with the initial idea for the lyric being "am I in trouble or are you in trouble?". Around six months later, Ross made a phone call to an ex-girlfriend after a night of drinking, where he left a message saying "if you could, would you just come back home?". Ross believed it finally "made sense" to write it after that phone call, with that specific lyric becoming the hook for the song. He stated that he wanted "the listener to feel like they get to know me through honest lyrics" in the song.

== Critical reception ==
Michael Major of Broadway World stated that Ross's "evolution shines" on "Trouble" as it "reflects his country, pop/rock influences showcased through energetic vocals, introspective storylines, and emotional honesty". Kim Carr of Y106.5 stated that Ross "has a very unique voice" and that "this song just hits you to your core".

== In popular culture ==
"Trouble" was featured in an episode of the second season of American sitcom Welcome to Flatch, which aired on Fox and Hulu in the United States.

== Live performances ==
Ross appeared on the show "Access Carolina" on the Fox Carolina television network and performed a live rendition of "Trouble" on January 6, 2023. In Regina, Saskatchewan, Ross performed the song live for Pure Country 92.7 during a promotional stop while on Lee Brice's "Beer Drinking Opportunity Tour". On July 26, 2023, Ross made his debut at the Grand Ole Opry in Nashville, Tennessee, and a live recording of his performance of "Trouble" from that night was released to digital and streaming platforms a month later.

In September 2023, Ross performed the song live at the Canadian Country Music Awards at the FirstOntario Centre in Hamilton, Ontario. The show was broadcast live on television on CTV in Canada, and his performance was later uploaded to YouTube. In March 2024, he performed parts of "Trouble" and his song "Single Again" at the 2024 Juno Awards in Halifax, Nova Scotia on CBC.

== Accolades ==
Year	Association	Category	Result	Ref
2023	Canadian Country Music Association	Songwriter(s) of the Year	Nominated	
2023	Canadian Country Music Association	Video of the Year	Nominated	
2024	Country Music Association of Ontario	Music Video of the Year	Nominated	
2024	Country Music Association of Ontario	Single of the Year	Nominated	
2024	Canadian Country Music Association	Single of the Year	Won	
2024	Canadian Country Music Association	Top Selling Canadian Single of the Year	Won	

== Music video ==
The official music video for "Trouble" premiered on ET Canada on February 7, 2023. Ross and his team did not want to have a "traditional music video," and chose to have Ross play the role of a firefighter alongside a female co-lead. The video leaves the question of who "the one in trouble" is open to interpretation. It was directed by Wales Tony, and filmed with the co-operation and assistance of the Maury County Fire Department in Tennessee.

== Credits and personnel ==
Credits adapted from AllMusic.

- Tim Galloway – bass guitar, guitar
- Matt Geroux – drums, keyboard, production, programming, recording
- Josh Ross – composition, primary vocals
- Justin Schipper – guitar
- Dan Shike – master engineering
- Mason Thornley – composition
- Doug Weir – mixing
- Jake Widenhofer – guitar

== Track listings ==
Digital download – single

1. "Trouble" – 3:34

Digital download – single

1. "Trouble (Live from the Opry / 2023)" – 4:27

Digital download – single

1. "Trouble (Piano Version)" – 3:34

== Charts ==
Chart performance for "Trouble"
Chart (2023–2024)	Peak position
Australia Country Hot 50 (The Music)	17
Canada (Canadian Hot 100)	48
Canada Country (Billboard)	1
US Digital Songs (Billboard)	39
US Hot Country Songs (Billboard)	43

== Certifications ==
Region	Certification	Certified units/sales
Canada (Music Canada)	2× Platinum	160,000^{‡}
United States (RIAA)	Gold	500,000^{‡}
^{‡} Sales+streaming figures based on certification alone.

== Release history ==
Release history and formats for "Trouble"
Country	Date	Format	Label	Ref.
Various	January 4, 2023	Digital download; streaming	The Core Entertainment; Universal Music Canada	
Canada	May 29, 2023	Country radio	The Core Entertainment; Universal Music Canada	
United States	June 12, 2023	Country radio	Mercury Nashville	
