= Nothing as It Seems (album) =

Studio album by Wave
- Released: June 19, 2001
- Recorded: 2000–2001
- Genre: Pop-rock, R&B, teen pop, pop
- Label: Warner Music Canada

Wave chronology
Nothing as It Seems (2001)	State of Mind (2002)

Singles from Wave
- 1. "California" Released: June 29, 2001; 2. "Think It Over" Released: September 7, 2001; 3. "Sleepless" Released: 2002

Nothing as It Seems is the debut studio album by Canadian pop rock band Wave. The album featured the hit singles "California" and "Think It Over". The album featured guitarists John Pierce and Tim Pierce, drummer Vinny Colaiuta, keyboardist Justin Gray, and producers Ben Dunk and Rick Neigher. The album was among the top 200 best-selling albums of 2001 in Canada. The album was certified gold in Canada in January 2002.

== Track listing ==
1. "California"
2. "Daydream"
3. "Until the Record Breaks"
4. "Sleepless"
5. "Read My Mind"
6. "Think It Over"
7. "Don't Leave"
8. "It's a Drag"
9. "I'd Give Anything"
10. "Touch"
11. "With the Stars"
12. "Clever"

== Charts ==
Chart (2001)	Peak position
Canadian Albums Chart	29

=== Year-end charts ===
Chart (2001)	Position
Canadian Albums (Nielsen SoundScan)	196

== Certifications ==
Certifications for Nothing as It Seems
Region	Certification	Certified units/sales
Canada (Music Canada)	Gold	50,000^{^}
^{^} Shipments figures based on certification alone.
