= Eric Ethridge =

Canadian country singer

- Origin: Sarnia, Ontario, Canada
- Genres: Country; country pop
- Occupation: Singer-songwriter
- Years active: 2014–present
- Labels: Red Dot; Anthem
- Website: ericethridge.com

Eric Ethridge is a Canadian country pop singer and songwriter. He has released two albums Good with Me (2020) and Family First (2024), and has two gold-certified singles in Canada with "California" and "If You Met Me First".

== Early life ==
Eric Ethridge was raised in Sarnia, Ontario and played football as a defensive end at the University of Western Ontario. Prior to pursuing a full-time career in music, Ethridge attended a chiropractic school in Toronto and worked as a chiropractor in Sarnia.

== Career ==
=== Early career and self-titled EP ===
In 2016, he won the Canadian Country Music Association's Discovery Award.

In July 2018, he released his self-titled debut EP Eric Ethridge. The single "Liquor's Callin' the Shots" reached the top 30 of Canadian country radio. In August 2018, he won the Grand Prize in the 2018 Unsigned Only Music Competition for his song "Girl On Fire".

In November 2018, Ethridge signed a worldwide recording and publishing deal with ole, who placed him on their label, Red Dot. Further singles from the EP included "Makin' Me Crazy", "California", and "If You Met Me First", the latter two of which were certified Gold by Music Canada.

=== 2020-present: Good with Me ===
In February 2020, Ethridge released his debut US single "Dream Girl", co-written by Dan + Shay. The track was then included on his April 2020 extended play Forever With You.

In August 2020, Ethridge released the single "Kiss Me Goodbye" On October 30, 2020, Ethridge released his debut full-length album Good with Me on Anthem Records (rebranded from Red Dot), which includes the singles "Dream Girl", "Kiss Me Goodbye", and "Sad Songs".

In 2022, Ethridge signed a management deal with Workshop Music Group and independently released the single "Made in Mexico".

== Personal life ==
Ethridge married fellow Canadian country singer-songwriter Kalsey Kulyk in December 2019. During the COVID-19 pandemic, the couple moved from Nashville, Tennessee into a van and performed under the "Love on the Road" banner throughout Canada. In August 2021, Kulyk gave birth to the couple's first child, a son named Wilder, in Alberta.

== Discography ==
=== Albums ===
Title	Details
Good with Me	Release date: October 30, 2020; Label: Anthem Entertainment; Format: Digital download, streaming
Family First	Release date: May 31, 2024; Label: Independent; Format: Digital download, streaming

=== Extended plays ===
Title	Details
Eric Ethridge	Release date: July 6, 2018; Label: Independent; Format: Digital download, streaming
Forever With You	Release date: April 24, 2020; Label: Anthem Entertainment; Format: Digital download, streaming

=== Singles ===
Year	Single	Peak positions	Certifications	Album
Year	Single	CAN Country	Certifications	Album
2017	"Liquor's Callin' the Shots"	31		Eric Ethridge
2017	"Makin' Me Crazy"	43		Eric Ethridge
2018	"California"	35	MC: Gold	Eric Ethridge
2019	"If You Met Me First"	42	MC: Gold	Eric Ethridge
2020	"Dream Girl"	38		Good with Me
2020	"Kiss Me Goodbye"	47		Good with Me
2021	"Sad Songs"	—		Good with Me
2022	"Made in Mexico"	47		Family First
2024	"Family First"	—		Family First

=== Music videos ===
Year	Video	Director
2017	"Liquor's Callin' the Shots"	
2018	"Makin' Me Crazy"	
2018	"California"	
2019	"If You Met Me First"	Ryan Hamblin
2020	"Dream Girl"	Quinton Cook
2020	"Forever With You"	Lucas Henney
2021	"Sad Songs"	Kash Tahen

== Awards and nominations ==
Year	Association	Category	Nominated work	Result	Ref
2016	Canadian Country Music Association	Discovery Award	—N/a	Won	
2019	Country Music Association of Ontario	Male Artist of the Year	—N/a	Nominated	
2020	Country Music Association of Ontario	Male Artist of the Year	—N/a	Nominated	
2020	Country Music Association of Ontario	Single of the Year	"If You Met Me First"	Nominated	
2020	Country Music Association of Ontario	Music Video of the Year	"If You Met Me First"	Nominated	
