= Kalsey Kulyk =

Canadian country singer and songwriter

- Born: July 23, 1997 (age 29); Hudson Bay, Saskatchewan, Canada
- Genres: Country; traditional country
- Occupations: Singer, songwriter
- Instruments: Guitar, vocals
- Years active: 2010-present
- Labels: Universal Music Canada; Phaymis; Red Dot; Anthem
- Website: Official website

Kalsey Kulyk (born July 23, 1997) is a Canadian country music singer and songwriter. She has released one extended play, and has charted multiple singles, including "Who I Was", "Love Me Like an Outlaw", and "Till I Get to Heaven". Her debut album Outlaw Poetry was released on February 23, 2024. Kulyk is currently signed to Universal Music Canada.

== Early life ==
Kulyk was born and raised in Hudson Bay, Saskatchewan. Her entire family worked on a mill, and also farmed in their spare time. She is of Ukrainian descent. Growing up, she participated in numerous talent competitions, winning several including the "Pasquia Idol" in Manitoba. She viewed Shania Twain as her musical idol. As a teenager, Kulyk was diagnosed with Hodgkin's lymphoma and underwent months of chemotherapy treatment.

== Career ==
At nineteen years old, Kulyk moved to Las Vegas, Nevada, to work with producer Richard Dashut. She initially released music on Calgary-based label Phaymis Records, including the single "With You" in 2014.

In 2017, Kulyk won the CCMA Discovery Award. She signed with olé Media Management's Red Dot label and subsequently moved to Nashville, Tennessee, and in 2019, released the songs "More Time" and "Bad Liar". Both songs were included on her self-titled debut extended play, Kalsey Kulyk, which was released on olé's rebranded label Anthem Entertainment on August 15, 2019. In August 2020, Kulyk released the single "Who I Was", which became her first charting song on the Billboard Canada Country chart. Her self-titled extended play received a nomination for "Roots Album of the Year" at the 2020 CCMA Awards.

In July 2022, Kulyk released the single "Big Deal", her first release as an independent artist. In February 2023, Kulyk released the single "Ain't Enough Whiskey". That spring, she competed on the third season of reality television show Canada's Got Talent. In June 2023, Kulyk released the single "Love Me Like an Outlaw", which became her first top 20 hit on Billboard Canada Country. In late 2024, Kulyk signed with Universal Music Canada, and she subsequently released her major label debut track "You Fight Dirty" in February 2025. In July 2025, she released the single "Till I Get to Heaven".

== Personal life ==
In December 2019, Kulyk married fellow Canadian country singer and songwriter Eric Ethridge. During the COVID-19 pandemic, the couple left their home in Nashville, Tennessee, lived in a van and performed in it across Canada, calling their informal tour "Love on the Road". In August 2021, Kulyk gave birth to the couple's first child, a son named Wilder. Kulyk and her family now reside in Beaumont, Alberta.

== Discography ==
=== Studio albums ===
Title	Details
Outlaw Poetry	Release date: February 23, 2024; Label: Independent; Format: Digital download, streaming

=== Extended plays ===
Title	Details
Kalsey Kulyk	Release date: August 30, 2019; Label: Anthem Entertainment LP; Format: Digital download, streaming
Her Rodeo	Release date: March 27, 2026; Label: Universal Music Canada; Format: Digital download, streaming

=== Singles ===
Year	Title	Peak chart positions	Album
Year	Title	CAN Country	Album
2014	"With You"	—	—N/a
2019	"Bad Liar"	—	Kalsey Kulyk
2020	"Who I Was"	34	Non-album single
2022	"Big Deal"	—	Outlaw Poetry
2023	"Ain't Enough Whiskey"	—	Outlaw Poetry
2023	"Love Me Like an Outlaw"	20	Outlaw Poetry
2024	"Dontcha"	43	Outlaw Poetry
2025	"You Fight Dirty"	46	Non-album single
2025	"Till I Get to Heaven"	29	Her Rodeo
2026	"Cut Him Loose"	39	Her Rodeo
"—" denotes releases that did not chart.

=== Music videos ===
Year	Title	Director
2019	"More Time"	Not listed
2019	"Bad Liar"	Not listed
2019	"Damn You Love"	Elise Lacret
2020	"Roll with It"	Preston Leatherman
2022	"Big Deal"	Not listed
2023	"Ain't Enough Whiskey"	Not listed
2023	"Love Me Like an Outlaw"	Not listed

== Awards and nominations ==
Year	Association	Category	Nominated work	Result	Ref
2020	Canadian Country Music Association	Roots Album of the Year	Kalsey Kulyk	Nominated	
