= Nate Haller =

Canadian country singer (born 1992)

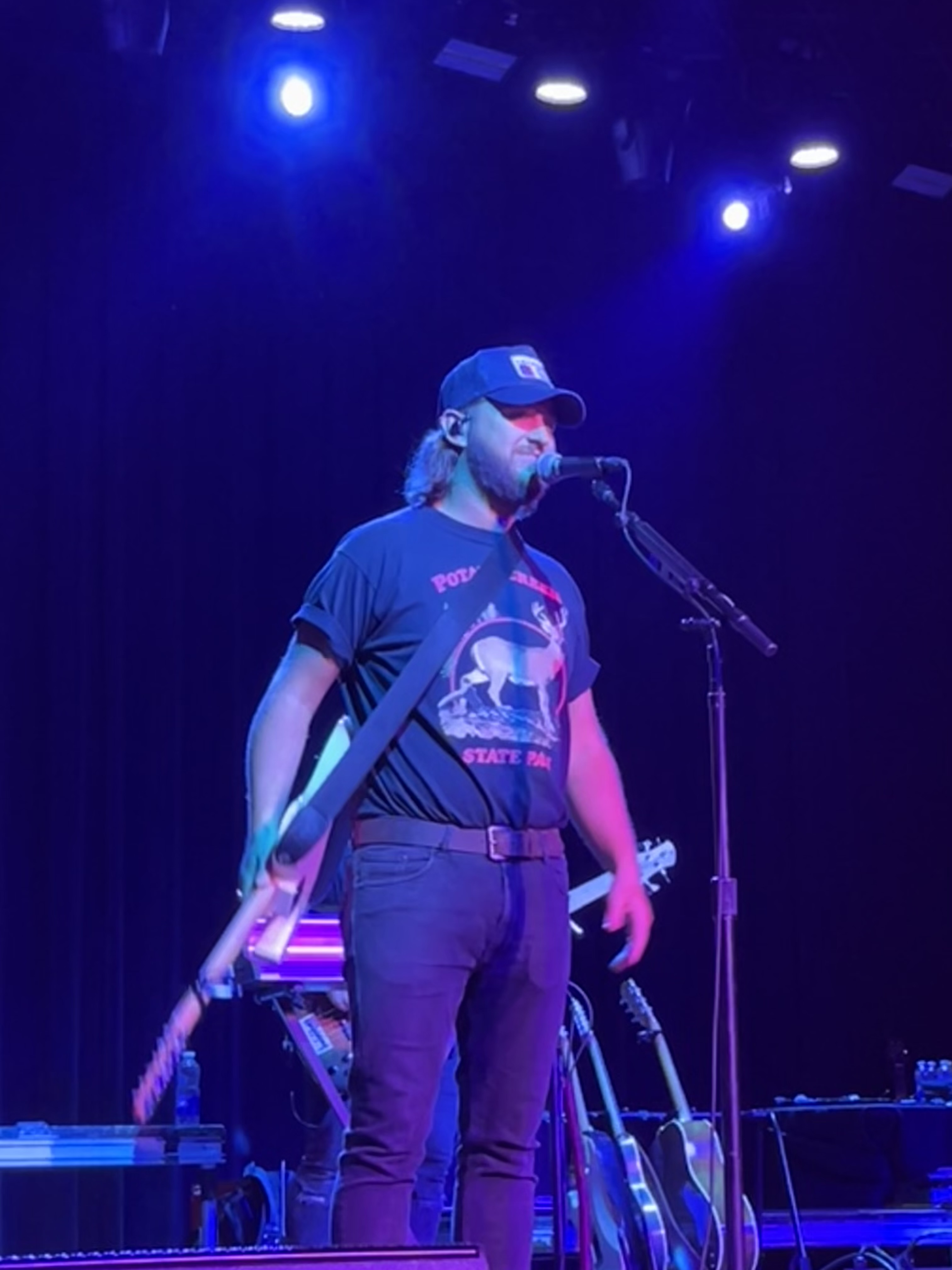
- Haller performing in 2024

Background information
- Born: Nate Hall; October 16, 1992 (age 34)
- Origin: Waterloo, Ontario, Canada
- Genres: Country; Pop
- Occupations: Singer, songwriter
- Instruments: Vocals, guitar, harmonica
- Years active: 2018–present
- Label: Starseed
- Website: Official website

Nate Haller is a Canadian country singer and songwriter. He has released the albums Party in the Back (2022) and Can't Stay Here (2026) on Starseed Records. Haller has charted multiple singles in Canada, including "Lightning in a Bottle", "Ain't Like Me", "Backfire", and "Thought About You".

== Early life ==
Haller grew up on a farmhouse in Waterloo, Ontario with both of his siblings taking an interest in music, but he stated that he initially only played his brother's guitar on occasion. He then was inspired to pursue music himself after seeing Australian singer-songwriter Xavier Rudd perform live while he was in high school. Soon after this, he was encouraged by a teacher in Grade 11 to enter a talent show, and began writing songs afterwards.

== Career ==
Haller began his music career playing in Kira Isabella's live band for seven years. After befriending Callum Maudsley, a guitar player in the live band for the Reklaws, Haller moved in with Maudsley and the Reklaws' Stuart Walker. He subsequently started touring for three years as the acoustic guitar player for the Reklaws, and credits them for showing him "how the industry works". Haller began fully pursuing his solo career after the onset of the COVID-19 pandemic, and signed with Starseed Entertainment in 2021.

Haller released his debut single "Lightning in a Bottle" in March 2021, and it subsequently became his first top ten on the Billboard Canada Country chart. He followed it up with the promotional single "Grew Up On" in June 2021, and his second radio single "Somewhere to Drink" in September 2022, which features Brett Kissel and the Reklaws. Haller was semi-finalist in the SiriusXM "Top of the Country" contest in 2021. In January 2022, Haller released the promotional single "Broken", and then followed it up with his third radio single "Ain't Like Me" in May 2022. He won "Rising Star" at the 2022 Country Music Association of Ontario Awards, and received a nomination in the same category at the 2022 CCMA Awards. In 2023, Haller released "Take My Name" to radio. He also received a nomination for "Breakthrough Artist or Group of the Year" at the CCMA Awards.

In August 2024, Haller released the single "Race to the Bottom". In June 2025, Haller released the single "Backfire", a collaboration with Tenille Townes. The song became his first to chart on the all-genre Canadian Hot 100. He followed that up with "Thought About You" in 2026. Haller won both Songwriter of the Year and Musical Collaboration of the Year at the 2026 Canadian Country Music Association Awards for "Backfire".

== Tours ==
- Thought About You Roadshow (2026)

== Discography ==
=== Albums ===
Title	Details
Party in the Back	Release date: November 18, 2022; Label: Starseed; Format: Digital download, streaming
Can't Stay Here	Release date: September 25, 2026; Label: Starseed; Format: Digital download, streaming

=== Singles ===
Year	Title	Peak chart positions		Album
Year	Title	CAN	CAN Country	Album
2021	"Lightning in a Bottle"	—	9	Party in the Back
2021	"Somewhere to Drink" (featuring Brett Kissel and The Reklaws)	—	25	Party in the Back
2022	"Ain't Like Me"	—	15	Party in the Back
2022	"Budweiser"	—	20	Party in the Back
2023	"Take My Name"	—	35	Party in the Back
2024	"Race to the Bottom"	—	22	Can't Stay Here
2025	"Backfire" (with Tenille Townes)	79	3	Can't Stay Here
2026	"Thought About You"	93	5	Can't Stay Here
2026	"Called It"	—	54	Can't Stay Here
"—" denotes releases that did not chart.

=== Music videos ===
Year	Title	Director
2021	"Lightning in a Bottle" (live)	
2021	"Grew Up On"	
2021	"Somewhere to Drink" (with Brett Kissel and The Reklaws)	Ben Knechtel
2022	"Broken"	Austin Chaffe
2022	"Budweiser" (live)	Austin Chaffe
2022	"Take My Name" (live)	Austin Chaffe
2026	"Thought About You"	Austin Chaffe

== Awards and nominations ==
Year	Association	Category	Nominated work	Result	Ref
2022	Country Music Association of Ontario	Rising Star	—N/a	Won	
2022	Canadian Country Music Association	Rising Star	—N/a	Nominated	
2023	Country Music Association of Ontario	Album of the Year	Party in the Back	Won	
2023	Country Music Association of Ontario	Fans' Choice	—N/a	Nominated	
2023	Country Music Association of Ontario	Male Artist of the Year	—N/a	Nominated	
2023	Canadian Country Music Association	Breakthrough Artist or Group of the Year	—N/a	Nominated	
2025	Country Music Association of Ontario	Male Artist of the Year	—N/a	Nominated	
2025	Country Music Association of Ontario	Single of the Year	"Race to the Bottom"	Nominated	
