= Josh Ross =

Canadian singer-songwriter (born 1994)

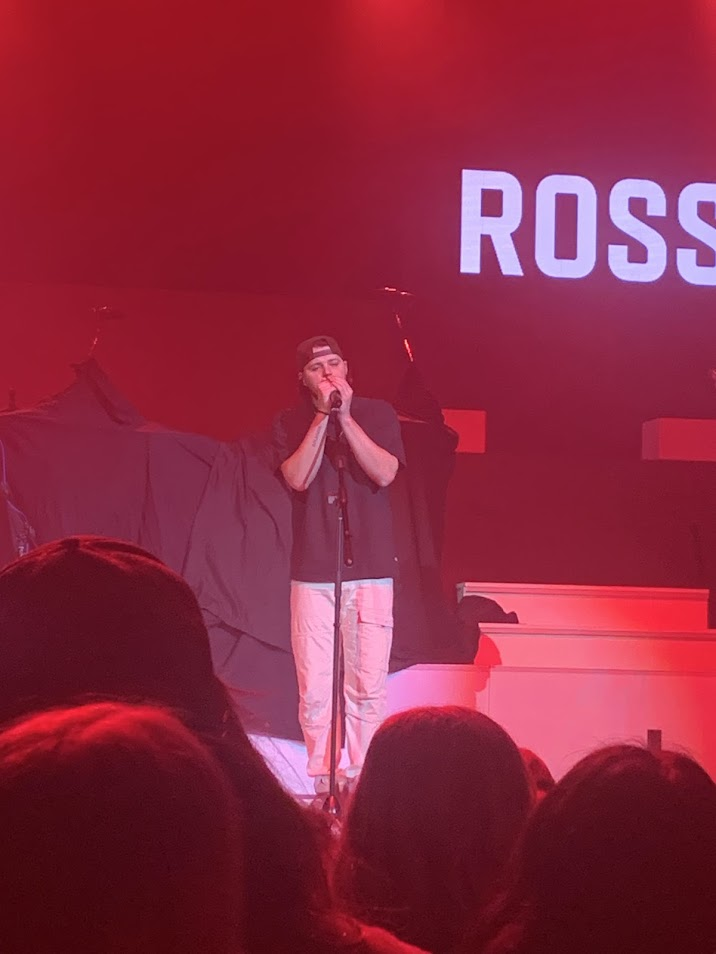
- Ross performing in Grand Rapids, Michigan in 2024

Background information
- Born: May 27, 1994 (age 32); Waterdown, Ontario, Canada
- Origin: Burlington, Ontario, Canada
- Genre: Country
- Occupation: Singer-songwriter
- Instruments: Vocals; guitar; piano
- Years active: 2018-present
- Labels: The Core; Universal Music Canada; Mercury Nashville
- Website: Official website

Joshua Ross (born May 27, 1996) is a Canadian country music singer and songwriter. He is managed by The Core Entertainment and jointly signed to Universal Music Canada and Mercury Nashville. Ross has charted multiple singles, including "On a Different Night", "Trouble", "Ain't Doin' Jack", "Single Again", and "Hate How You Look". In March 2024, he released the extended play Complicated. His debut album Later Tonight was released in September 2025.

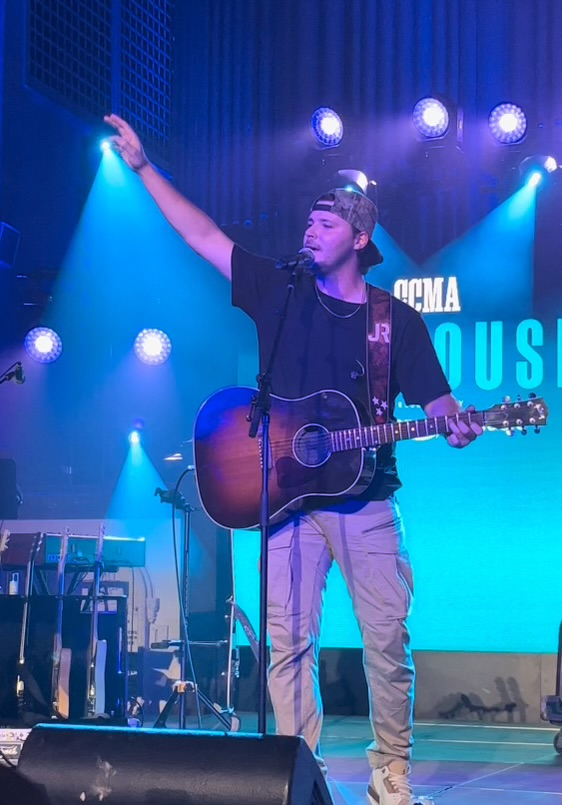
Ross performing in Hamilton, Ontario in 2023

== Early life ==
Ross was born in Waterdown, Ontario, and later moved to nearby Burlington, Ontario for school at Nelson Highschool. He spent most of his youth playing sports such as hockey, football, soccer, and motocross. He has extended family in Los Angeles and Maine, and visited the United States often as a child. Ross attended Western University where he played varsity football as a defensive back. He had hoped to play in the Canadian Football League. A series of injuries coupled with two surgeries derailed his football career in university, and he elected to pursue a career in music as a result. Ross listened to both country and rock music growing up, and cites Steve Earle as one of his biggest musical influences.

== Career ==
=== Early career ===
While working in construction management, Ross entered several music competitions including the Magna Hoedown in Aurora, Ontario, and the Boots and Hearts Emerging Artists Showcase. He began making trips to Nashville, Tennessee in 2018, with the support of fellow Canadian country artist Aaron Goodvin, before making a permanent move there in 2019. Ross released his first radio single "If You Were a Song" as an independent artist that year. He released the five-song extended play Do What You Love in 2020.

=== 2022–2023: Universal Music Group, Grey Cup halftime show ===
In February 2022, Ross released the single "First Taste of Gone", which he co-wrote with Mason Thornley. He then became one of the final eight finalists for SiriusXM's "Top of the Country" contest. Ross subsequently signed a joint recording and management deal with The Core Entertainment and Universal Music Canada in April 2022. With Universal taking over promotion of "First Taste of Gone", the song moved into the top five of the Canada Country chart, and entered the Canadian Hot 100. Ross released the song "On a Different Night" in July 2022, which would become a radio single later that September. He received a nomination for "Rising Star" at the 2022 Canadian Country Music Awards. Ross performed at the halftime show for the 109th Grey Cup in Regina, Saskatchewan, alongside Tyler Hubbard and Jordan Davis.

In January 2023, Ross released the single "Trouble". He opened for Bailey Zimmerman at the end of his headlining tour in the United States in the same month. In March 2023, Universal Music Group Nashville signed Ross in partnership with Universal Music Canada and The Core. Ross subsequently released the song "Red Flags" later that month. He joined Lee Brice's "Beer Drinking Opportunity Tour" with Tenille Arts in Canada in the spring of 2023, and signed a publishing deal with Warner Chappell Music shortly thereafter. He was named "Rising Star" at the 2023 Country Music Association of Ontario Awards. In the summer of 2023, Ross was an opening act for Nickelback on their North American "Get Rollin' Tour" along with Brantley Gilbert. In July 2023, he released the song "Ain't Doin' Jack". That same month, he made his debut performance at the Grand Ole Opry in Nashville, Tennessee. At the 2023 Canadian Country Music Awards in September 2023, Ross was nominated in six total categories, and won the award for "Breakthrough Artist or Group of the Year". He released the song "Ain't the One" at the end of the month.

=== 2024–present: Complicated, Later Tonight, The Trouble Tour, and the Single Again Tour ===
In 2024, Ross released the songs "Single Again" and "Truck Girl". Ross also embarked on his debut headlining tour "The Trouble Tour" in Canada in early 2024, and he joined Bailey Zimmerman again for his headlining "Religiously: The Tour" in the United States, Great Britain, and Ireland. He released his extended play Complicated on March 29, 2024. He followed that up with the release of the promotional singles "New Me" in May 2024 and "Want This Beer", a duet with Julia Michaels, in July 2024. From August to November 2024, Ross embarked on his debut American headlining tour, the "Single Again Tour". He won five awards at the 2024 Canadian Country Music Awards, including "Entertainer of the Year" and "Single of the Year. Ross also won the Jeff Walker Global Country Artist Award at the 58th Annual Country Music Association Awards.

In February 2025, Ross released the single "Leave Me Too". He tied with Tate McRae for the most nominations at the Juno Awards of 2025, and won the Juno Award for Country Album of the Year with Complicated. In April 2025, Ross released the single "Hate How You Look". In May 2025, Ross collaborated with hip hop artist Akon on the song "Drunk Right Now (Na Na Na)", a reimagined version of Akon's song "Right Now (Na Na Na)". In July 2025, "Single Again" reached number one on the Mediabase Country chart, making Ross the third Canadian man ever, after Hank Snow and Paul Brandt, to land a number one country radio single in the United States. Ross released his debut album Later Tonight on September 19, 2025. He supported the album with his "Later Tonight Tour" across Canada in early 2026. Ross was nominated for four awards at the Juno Awards of 2026. Ross released two singles in 2026: "Kicked Out of Bars" and "Drink Things Through". In the fall of 2026, he joined Dan + Shay on "The Young Tour" as an opening act for the U.S. dates.

== Controversy ==
In June 2025, Ross apologized on social media after a video of him calling United States "the best country in the world" while performing at the Tailgates 'N Tallboys Festival in Indiana trended online and led to a barrage of criticism from Canadian fans due to the ongoing trade war between the two nations. Weeks later, he performed at Heritage Canada's Canada Day concert in Ottawa.

== Tours ==
- The Trouble Tour (2024)
- Single Again Tour (2024)
- Later Tonight Tour (2026)

== Discography ==
=== Studio albums ===
Title	Details	Peak chart positions	Certifications
Title	Details	CAN	Certifications
Later Tonight	Released: September 19, 2025; Label: The Core Entertainment / Universal Music Canada / Mercury Nashville; Format: CD, vinyl, digital download, streaming	17	MC: Gold

=== Extended plays ===
Title	Details	Peak chart positions		Certifications
Title	Details	CAN	US Heat	Certifications
Do What You Love	Released: November 20, 2020; Label: Independent (Note: Do What You Love was later re-released on The Core Entertainment / Universal Music Canada.); Format: Digital download, streaming	—	—	
Live Sessions	Released: November 11, 2022; Label: The Core Entertainment / Universal Music Canada; Format: Digital download, streaming	—	—	
Complicated	Released: March 29, 2024; Label: The Core Entertainment / Universal Music Canada / Mercury Nashville; Format: CD, digital download, streaming	73	11	MC: Gold

=== Singles ===
Year	Title	Peak chart positions						Certifications	Album
Year	Title	CAN	CAN Country	AUS Country	US	US Country	US Country Airplay	Certifications	Album
2019	"If You Were a Song"	—	—	—	—	—	—		Non-album singles
2022	"First Taste of Gone"	54	5	—	—	—	—	MC: Platinum	Non-album singles
2022	"On a Different Night"	65	4	—	—	—	—	MC: Platinum	Non-album singles
2023	"Trouble"	48	1	17	— (Note: "Trouble" did not enter the Hot 100, but peaked at number 39 on the U.S. Digital Songs component chart.)	43	—	MC: 2× Platinum; RIAA: Gold	Complicated
2023	"Ain't Doin' Jack"	69	1	26	—	—	—	MC: Platinum	Non-album single
2024	"Single Again"	60	1	4	73	22	2	MC: 2× Platinum; RIAA: Gold	Complicated
2025	"Leave Me Too"	58	5	—	—	—	—		Later Tonight
2025	"Drunk Right Now (Na Na Na)" (with Akon)	67	—	7	—	—	—	MC: Gold	Later Tonight
2025	"Hate How You Look"	28	1	4	52	12	1	MC: Platinum	Later Tonight
2026	"Later Tonight"	—	—	9	—	—	—		Later Tonight
2026	"Scared of Getting Sober"	89	4	—	—	—	—		Later Tonight
2026	"Kicked Out of Bars"	—	—	17	—	—	—		TBA
2026	"Drink Things Through"	84	23	—	—	—	51		TBA
"—" denotes releases that did not chart or were not released to that territory.

=== Music videos ===
Year	Title	Director
2021	"Tall Boys"	Wales Toney
2022	"On a Different Night"	Wales Toney
2023	"Trouble"	Wales Toney
2023	"Ain't Doin' Jack"	Unlisted
2024	"Want This Beer"	Unlisted
2024	"Single Again"	Jack Owens

== Awards and nominations ==
Year	Association	Category	Nominated work	Result	Ref
2022	Canadian Country Music Association	Rising Star	—N/a	Nominated	
2023	Country Music Association of Ontario	Fans' Choice	—N/a	Nominated	
2023	Country Music Association of Ontario	Male Artist of the Year	—N/a	Nominated	
2023	Country Music Association of Ontario	Rising Star	—N/a	Won	
2023	Country Music Association of Ontario	Single of the Year	"First Taste of Gone"	Nominated	
2023	Country Music Association of Ontario	Songwriter of the Year	"On a Different Night"	Nominated	
2023	Canadian Country Music Association	Breakthrough Artist or Group of the Year	—N/a	Won	
2023	Canadian Country Music Association	Fans' Choice	—N/a	Nominated	
2023	Canadian Country Music Association	Male Artist of the Year	—N/a	Nominated	
2023	Canadian Country Music Association	Single of the Year	"On a Different Night"	Nominated	
2023	Canadian Country Music Association	Songwriter(s) of the Year	"Trouble"	Nominated	
2023	Canadian Country Music Association	Video of the Year"	"Trouble"	Nominated	
2024	Juno Awards	Juno Fan Choice	—N/a	Nominated	
2024	Country Music Association of Ontario	Fans' Choice	—N/a	Nominated	
2024	Country Music Association of Ontario	Male Artist of the Year	—N/a	Nominated	
2024	Country Music Association of Ontario	Music Video of the Year	"Trouble"	Nominated	
2024	Country Music Association of Ontario	Single of the Year	"Trouble"	Nominated	
2024	Canadian Country Music Association	Album of the Year	Complicated	Nominated	
2024	Canadian Country Music Association	Entertainer of the Year	—N/a	Won	
2024	Canadian Country Music Association	Fans' Choice	—N/a	Nominated	
2024	Canadian Country Music Association	Male Artist of the Year	—N/a	Won	
2024	Canadian Country Music Association	Single of the Year	"Trouble"	Won	
2024	Canadian Country Music Association	Top Selling Canadian Album of the Year	Complicated	Won	
2024	Canadian Country Music Association	Top Selling Canadian Single of the Year	"Trouble"	Won	
2024	Country Music Association	Jeff Walker Global Country Artist Award	—N/a	Won	
2025	Juno Awards	Album of the Year	Complicated	Nominated	
2025	Juno Awards	Artist of the Year	—N/a	Nominated	
2025	Juno Awards	Country Album of the Year	Complicated	Won	
2025	Juno Awards	Juno Fan Choice	—N/a	Nominated	
2025	Juno Awards	Single of the Year	"Single Again"	Nominated	
2025	Country Music Association of Ontario	Compass Award	—N/a	Won	
2025	Country Music Association of Ontario	Fans' Choice	—N/a	Nominated	
2025	Canadian Country Music Association	Entertainer of the Year	—N/a	Won	
2025	Canadian Country Music Association	Fans' Choice	—N/a	Nominated	
2025	Canadian Country Music Association	Male Artist of the Year	—N/a	Nominated	
2025	Canadian Country Music Association	Musical Collaboration of the Year	"Want This Beer" (with Julia Michaels)	Nominated	
2025	Canadian Country Music Association	Single of the Year	"Single Again"	Won	
2025	Canadian Country Music Association	Top Selling Canadian Album of the Year	Complicated	Won	
2025	Canadian Country Music Association	Top Selling Canadian Single of the Year	"Single Again"	Won	
2025	Canadian Country Music Association	Video of the Year	"Single Again"	Won	
2026	Juno Awards	Album of the Year	Later Tonight	Nominated	
2026	Juno Awards	Country Album of the Year	Later Tonight	Nominated	
2026	Juno Awards	Juno Fan Choice	—N/a	Nominated	
2026	Juno Awards	Single of the Year	"Hate How You Look"	Nominated	
