= Backfire (song) =

2025 single by Nate Haller and Tenille Townes

Single by Nate Haller and Tenille Townes

from the album Can't Stay Here
- Released: June 20, 2025
- Genre: Country
- Length: 3:35
- Label: Starseed
- Songwriters: Nate Haller; Tenille Townes; James Adam Shelley; Michael August; Stuart Walker
- Producers: Todd Clark; James Adam Shelley

Nate Haller singles chronology
"Race to the Bottom" (2024)	"Backfire" (2025)	"Thought About You" (2026)

Tenille Townes singles chronology
"Thing That Brought Me Here (Truck Song)" (2024)	"Backfire" (2025)	"Sunshine's Free" (2026)

Video visualizer
- "Backfire" on YouTube

"Backfire" is a song recorded by Canadian country artist Nate Haller with fellow Canadian country artist Tenille Townes. The two artists wrote the song with Stuart Walker, Michael August, and James Adam Shelley, the latter of whom produced the track with Todd Clark. The song marked Haller's first entry on the Billboard Canadian Hot 100.

== Background ==
"Backfire" was written while Haller was on a trip to Nashville, Tennessee. Stuart Walker of the Reklaws, a former housemate of Haller's, invited him to join a writing session with fellow songwriters Michael August and James Adam Shelley. The four men wrote the original version of the song, which Haller later realized could be a male-female duet. Haller then reached out to Tenille Townes, whom he had toured as an opening act for in 2022, and Townes agreed to join him on the song. Walker stated that the title "Backfire" was inspired by the "give and take of a relationship" and "trying to get out of it".

== Music video ==
The official visualizer video for "Backfire" was directed by Taylor Kelly and premiered on YouTube on June 20, 2025.

== Credits and personnel ==
Credits adapted from Apple Music.

- Joao Carvalho – mastering engineer
- Jay Dufour – mixing engineer
- Todd Clark – bass, guitar, keyboards, production, programming
- Nate Haller – vocals
- Sam Hunter – banjo, guitar
- James Adam Shelley – production
- Tenille Townes – vocals

== Charts ==
Chart performance for "Backfire"
Chart (2025)	Peak position
Canada Hot 100 (Billboard)	79
Canada Country (Billboard)	3
