= Robyn Ottolini =

Canadian country singer-songwriter (born 1995)

- Born: July 31, 1995 (age 31)
- Origin: Uxbridge, Ontario, Canada
- Genre: Country
- Occupation: Singer-songwriter
- Years active: 2012–present
- Labels: Aleu; Empire; Warner Music Nashville
- Website: robynottolini.com

Robyn Ottolini (born July 31, 1995) is a Canadian country singer and songwriter. She has released five extended plays as well as the platinum-certified single "F-150".

== Early life ==
Ottolini was raised in Uxbridge, Ontario and began songwriting at the age of 13. She cites Kacey Musgraves, Lennon & Maisy, and Sam Hunt as influences on her music.

== Career ==
In 2016, Ottolini was the second runner-up at the Boots and Hearts Music Festival’s Emerging Artist Showcase. In February 2019, she independently released her debut EP Classic. She was nominated for the Rising Star Award at the 2019 Country Music Association of Ontario Awards.

In January 2020, Ottolini released the song "F-150". The track was included on her February 2020 release The I'm Not Always Hilarious EP. Towards the latter half of 2020, "F-150" gained traction on TikTok and charted at #3 on the Rolling Stone Trending 25 chart in the United States for the week of October 1, 2020. Amidst the success of the track, she signed a record deal with Warner Music Nashville.

"F-150" impacted country radio formats on February 16, 2021, and became her first Top 10 hit on the Billboard Canada Country chart, and first gold-certified single in Canada. In June 2021, Ottolini released her major-label debut project The But I'm Not Always Sad Either EP, which included the single "Tell You Everything". Later that year, she won the "Rising Star" award at the 2021 Canadian Country Music Awards.

In the spring of 2023, Ottolini departed Warner Nashville, and signed a distribution deal with Empire Distribution. She released the single "Match for My Memory" as part of her new deal. On January 19, 2024, Ottolini released the extended play Growing Up to Do.

In 2026, Ottolini signed a distribution deal with ONErpm and released her debut album A Safe Place to Land.

== Tours ==
- All My Friends Are Hot Tour (2023–2024)
- Way, Way Back Tour (2025)

== Discography ==
=== Albums ===
| Title | Details |
|---|---|
| A Safe Place to Land | Release date: August 21, 2026; Label: Independent; Format: Digital download, streaming |

=== Extended plays ===
| Title | Details |
|---|---|
| Classic | Release date: February 8, 2019; Label: Independent; Format: CD, digital download, streaming |
| The I'm Not Always Hilarious EP | Release date: February 21, 2020; Label: Independent; Format: Digital download, streaming |
| The But I'm Not Always Sad Either EP | Release date: June 25, 2021; Label: Warner Music Nashville; Format: Digital download, streaming |
| The I'm Not Always Put Together EP | Release date: January 7, 2022; Label: Warner Music Nashville; Format: Digital download, streaming |
| Growing Up to Do | Release date: January 19, 2024; Label: Independent; Format: Digital download, streaming |

=== Singles ===
List of singles, with selected chart positions and certifications
| Year | Title | Peak chart positions | | | Certifications | Album |
| Year | Title | CAN | CAN Country | US Country Airplay | Certifications | Album |
|---|---|---|---|---|---|---|
| 2012 | "Ring Around the Roses" | — | — | — | | Open Doors & Fairy Tales |
| 2013 | "Little Back Road" | — | — | — | | Open Doors & Fairy Tales |
| 2014 | "Open Doors & Fairy Tales" | — | — | — | | Open Doors & Fairy Tales |
| 2021 | "F-150" | 65 | 8 | 59 | MC: Platinum | The I'm Not Always Hilarious EP |
| 2021 | "Tell You Everything" | — | 21 | — | MC: Gold | The But I'm Not Always Sad Either EP |
| 2022 | "Trust Issues" | — | 40 | — | | The I'm Not Always Hilarious EP |
| 2023 | "Match for My Memory" | — | 22 | — | | Non-album single |
| 2024 | "I Kissed Your Boyfriend" | — | — | — | | Growing Up to Do |
| 2025 | "Airplane Bottle" | — | 32 | — | | A Safe Place to Land |
| 2026 | "Better Not to Know" | — | — | — | | A Safe Place to Land |
"—" denotes releases that did not chart or were not released to that territory

=== Christmas singles ===
| Year | Single | Peak positions | Album |
| Year | Single | CAN Country | Album |
|---|---|---|---|
| 2021 | "Hangover for Christmas" | 47 | —N/a |

==== As featured artist ====
| Year | Single | Artist | Album |
|---|---|---|---|
| 2024 | "Unwell" | Jesse Slack | Non-album single |

=== Music videos ===
| Year | Video | Director |
|---|---|---|
| 2018 | "Where We're At" | Tim Deegan |
| 2020 | "F-150" | Ben Knechtel |
| 2021 | "Hangover for Christmas" | |
| 2021 | "Boujee on a Budget" | |
| 2022 | "Trust Issues" | Ben Knechtel |
| 2022 | "Say It" | |
| 2022 | "Busy" | Ben Knechtel |
| 2023 | "Sad to Work (Closing Shift)" | Connor Scheffler |
| 2023 | "Match for My Memory" | Connor Scheffler |

== Awards and nominations ==
| Year | Association | Category | Nominated work | Result | Ref |
|---|---|---|---|---|---|
| 2019 | Country Music Association of Ontario | Rising Star | —N/a | Nominated | |
| 2021 | Country Music Association of Ontario | Album of the Year | The I'm Not Always Hilarious EP | Nominated | |
| 2021 | Country Music Association of Ontario | Female Artist of the Year | —N/a | Nominated | |
| 2021 | Country Music Association of Ontario | Rising Star of the Year | —N/a | Won | |
| 2021 | Country Music Association of Ontario | Songwriter(s) of the Year | "F-150" (with Mark Schroor, Erik Fintelman) | Nominated | |
| 2021 | Country Music Association of Ontario | Single of the Year | "F-150" | Nominated | |
| 2021 | Canadian Country Music Association | Rising Star | —N/a | Won | |
| 2022 | Country Music Association of Ontario | Album of the Year | The But I'm Not Always Sad Either EP | Nominated | |
| 2022 | Country Music Association of Ontario | Fans' Choice | —N/a | Nominated | |
| 2022 | Country Music Association of Ontario | Female Artist of the Year | —N/a | Nominated | |
| 2022 | Country Music Association of Ontario | Music Video of the Year | "F-150" | Won | |
| 2022 | Country Music Association of Ontario | Single of the Year | "Trust Issues" | Nominated | |
| 2022 | Country Music Association of Ontario | Songwriter(s) of the Year | "Tell You Everything" (with Jesse Slack) | Nominated | |
| 2022 | Canadian Country Music Association | Fans' Choice | —N/a | Nominated | |
| 2022 | Canadian Country Music Association | Female Artist of the Year | —N/a | Nominated | |
| 2023 | Country Music Association of Ontario | Fans' Choice | —N/a | Nominated | |
| 2023 | Country Music Association of Ontario | Female Artist of the Year | —N/a | Won | |
| 2023 | Country Music Association of Ontario | Music Video of the Year | "Busy" | Nominated | |
| 2023 | Country Music Association of Ontario | Single of the Year | "Say It" | Won | |
| 2023 | Country Music Association of Ontario | Songwriter(s) of the Year | "Say It" (with Nate Miles, Emily Falvey) | Nominated | |
| 2024 | Country Music Association of Ontario | Female Artist of the Year | —N/a | Nominated | |
| 2024 | Country Music Association of Ontario | Single of the Year | "Match for My Memory" | Nominated | |
| 2025 | Country Music Association of Ontario | Album/EP of the Year | Growing Up to Do | Nominated | |
| 2025 | Country Music Association of Ontario | Female Artist of the Year | —N/a | Won | |
