= 2019 in country music =

This is a list of notable events in country music that took place in 2019.

== Events ==
- January 4 – Dolly Parton Celebrates her 50th Anniversary as a member of the Grand Ole Opry
- January 21 – Carrie Underwood gives birth to second son, Jacob Fisher, with husband Mike Fisher.
- February – Country music duo Walker McGuire disbands.
- February 10 – At the 61st Annual Grammy Awards, Kacey Musgraves wins all 4 awards she was nominated for, including the all-genre Album of the Year for Golden Hour.
- March – "Old Town Road," a song combining elements of country rap, hip hop, Southern hip hop and trap and performed by rap newcomer Lil Nas X, debuts on the Hot Country Songs chart at No. 19; the song that charts is a remix, featuring vocals by Billy Ray Cyrus. However, the very next week, the song is removed from the chart, with the magazine disqualifying the song on the grounds that it did not fit the country genre. There is speculation that had the song remained on the chart, it would have reached No. 1 as of the chart dated April 6, 2019. On July 29 it reaches its seventeenth week atop the Billboard Hot 100, the all-time record. Later in the year, hip-hop music producer Blanco Brown records and releases "The Git Up," which is called a "sequel" and "next viral country rap song". The new style of music and its related controversies continue the long-standing discussion of what is country music, one that dates to the 1970s.
- March 2 – Jesse McReynolds celebrates his 55th Grand Ole Opry anniversary
- March 6 – Brandi Carlile, Amanda Shires and Maren Morris officially announce that they are forming a supergroup known as the Highwomen. With the name paying homage to the Highwaymen (which was composed of Johnny Cash, Waylon Jennings, Willie Nelson and Kris Kristofferson), the trio revealed that their line-up would allow for various guests to join them, with Chely Wright, Courtney Marie Andrews, Margo Price, Sheryl Crow and Janelle Monáe all hinted as potential collaborators. The group reveal their fourth member will be Natalie Hemby and perform together for the first time at Loretta Lynn's 87th birthday concert by singing "It Wasn't God Who Made Honky Tonk Angels".
- March 27 – Wanda Jackson announces her retirement from performing due to health and safety concerns via a statement on her Facebook page.
- April 1 – Loretta Lynn celebrates her 87th birthday (which is actually April 14) with an all-star concert held at Nashville's Bridgestone Arena. Performers include: Garth Brooks, Trisha Yearwood, Martina McBride, Alison Krauss, Lee Ann Womack, Little Big Town, Margo Price, Kacey Musgraves, Brandy Clark, Cam, Jack White, Brandi Carlile, Maren Morris, Amanda Shires, Natalie Hemby, Holly Williams, Miranda Lambert, Pistol Annies, Keith Urban, Randy Houser, Darius Rucker, Tanya Tucker, Crystal Gayle, Peggy Sue, John Carter Cash, Alan Jackson and George Strait. Lynn herself sings live for the first time since 2017, performing her signature song "Coal Miner's Daughter" with the ensemble.
- April 14 – Hal Ketchum's wife announces via his Facebook page that he will be retiring due to complications from Alzheimer's disease.
- April 16 – Kelsea Ballerini is inducted as the youngest member of the Grand Ole Opry, with Carrie Underwood officiating the induction.
- May 14
  - Randy Travis releases his first memoir, titled Forever and Ever, Amen: A Memoir of Music, Faith, and Braving the Storms of Life.
  - Rodney Atkins' "Caught Up in the Country" charts for a 57th week on Country Airplay, beating by one week the previous record for the longest continuous run on that chart.
- June 6 – Granger Smith's youngest son, River Kelly, unexpectedly dies at the age of 3 after what he refers to as a "serious accident", later revealed to be caused by drowning in the family pool. River had previously been featured as a cameo in Smith's "Happens Like That" video 2 years prior.
- June 30 – Music executive and manager Scooter Braun buys Big Machine Label Group, which includes the masters to Taylor Swift's first 6 studio albums. Swift is angry, claiming that she tried to buy the masters herself for years, but Braun sells them to Ithaca Holdings for $300 million in November 2020. As a result, Swift began re-recording 4 of her albums that she originally recorded on the label in November 2020. The first of these, Fearless (Taylor's Version), was released in April 2021. Swift would buy back the masters of all the original albums May 30, 2025.
- August 19 – Carrie Underwood is announced as host of the CMA Awards, her first year without Brad Paisley as a co-host; Dolly Parton and Reba McEntire will co-host the show.
- September 9 – Blake Shelton creates a Twitter campaign for Craig Morgan's current single, "The Father, My Son and the Holy Ghost", written in memory of his 19-year-old son, Jerry Greer, who died in July 2016, to be No. 1 on iTunes' all-genre chart. Celebrities ranging from Kelly Clarkson to Ellen DeGeneres to Travis Tritt respond, and the song reaches No. 1 on Sept. 12, 2019.
- September 15–25 – Country Music, a 16.5 hour documentary series by Ken Burns airs on PBS. The series took eight years to film and research, and features interviews with over 100 artists and key members of the country music community, including several who had died that decade.
- September 19 – One of Josh Turner's tour buses crashes off a cliff in California, killing one and injuring seven. Turner himself was not on the bus at the time.
- October 5 – American Idol finalists Gabby Barrett and Cade Foehner are married in Texas.
- October 9 – Radio host Bob Kingsley, host of Bob Kingsley's Country Top 40 (and earlier the longtime host of American Country Countdown), announces that he is taking a leave from the show due to a diagnosis of bladder cancer. Eight days later, Kingsley died from his illness.
- October 9 – Singer-songwriter Sam Williams, son of Hank Williams Jr., and the grandson of Hank Williams, made his debut on the Grand Ole Opry, singing "Can't Fool Your Own Blood".
- October 13 – Kenny Dixon, the drummer in Kane Brown's band, is killed in a car accident.
- October 19 – The Lifetime network premieres the television film Patsy & Loretta, which showcases the friendship between Patsy Cline and Loretta Lynn. Megan Hilty and Jessie Mueller portray Cline and Lynn, respectively.
- November 13
  - 2019 CMA Awards celebrates women in country music, opening with an all-star medley that included the likes of Tanya Tucker and Sara Evans, while Maren Morris wins Album of the Year for Girl and Kacey Musgraves wins for Female Vocalist. The night also sparked controversy, as Garth Brooks wins Entertainer of the Year, causing backlash from Carrie Underwood and Eric Church fans, whom many predicted would win the honor.
  - Gretchen Wilson and Carrie Underwood at the CMA Awards.
- November 22 – Singer Maddie Marlow of duo Maddie & Tae weds Jonah Font.
- December 8 – The 2019 Kennedy Center Honors award Linda Ronstadt; tribute performers included Trisha Yearwood and Carrie Underwood.
- December 18 – Radio host Fitz is named as the successor of Bob Kingsley on Bob Kingsley's Country Top 40.
- December 28 – The final episode of "ACC Rewind," a program featuring re-airings of original (edited) broadcasts of "American Country Countdown" from the 1990s and early 2000s, is aired, and features the 1999 year-end countdown.
- December 31 – Carrie Underwood announces on Instagram that she is stepping down as host of the CMA Awards.

== Top hits of the year ==
The following songs placed within the Top 20 on the Hot Country Songs, Country Airplay, or Canada Country charts in 2019:

=== Singles released by American and Australian artists ===
Songs	Airplay	Canada	Single	Artist	References
20	—	—	"1, 2 Many"	Luke Combs featuring Brooks & Dunn	
3	1	1	"All to Myself"	Dan + Shay	
28	17	40	"Back to Life"	Rascal Flatts	
1	1	1	"Beautiful Crazy"	Luke Combs	
2	1	1	"Beer Never Broke My Heart"	Luke Combs	
11	3	29	"Burn Out"	Midland	
5	2	1	"Burning Man"	Dierks Bentley featuring Brothers Osborne	
17	8	15	"Buy My Own Drinks"	Runaway June	
20	21	46	"Caught Up in the Country"	Rodney Atkins featuring The Fisk Jubilee Singers	
9	7	1	"Down to the Honkytonk"	Jake Owen	
2	1	1	"Even Though I'm Leaving"	Luke Combs	
20	17	29	"Every Little Honky Tonk Bar"	George Strait	
5	1	1	"Every Little Thing"	Russell Dickerson	
3	1	6	"Eyes on You"	Chase Rice	
19	—	—	"For My Daughter"	Kane Brown	
8	1	5	"Girl"	Maren Morris	
5	1	1	"Girl Like You"	Jason Aldean	
1	44	37	"The Git Up"	Blanco Brown	
1	1	1	"God's Country"	Blake Shelton	
3	1	1	"Good as You"	Kane Brown	
8	1	5	"Good Girl"	Dustin Lynch	
6	1	1	"Good Vibes"	Chris Janson	
14	18	36	"Hell Right"	Blake Shelton featuring Trace Adkins	
2	1	2	"Here Tonight"	Brett Young	
2	1	1	"I Don't Know About You"	Chris Lane	
12	14	10	"It All Comes Out in the Wash"	Miranda Lambert	
2	1	2	"Knockin' Boots"	Luke Bryan	
17	—	—	"Like a Rodeo"	Kane Brown	
6	1	1	"Living"	Dierks Bentley	
3	1	1	"Look What God Gave Her"	Thomas Rhett	
8	1	1	"Love Ain't"	Eli Young Band	
9	2	14	"Love Someone"	Brett Eldredge	
14	11	27	"Love Wins"	Carrie Underwood	
7	1	8	"Love You Too Late"	Cole Swindell	
8	1	1	"Make It Sweet"	Old Dominion	
4	2	6	"Millionaire"	Chris Stapleton	
7	2	1	"Miss Me More"	Kelsea Ballerini	
30	18	10	"Never Comin' Down"	Keith Urban	
8	5	14	"Night Shift"	Jon Pardi	
19	50	—	"Old Town Road"	Lil Nas X featuring Billy Ray Cyrus	
13	11	20	"On My Way to You"	Cody Johnson	
2	1	1	"One Man Band"	Old Dominion	
10	3	7	"One That Got Away"	Michael Ray	
1	—	37	"One Thing Right"	Marshmello & Kane Brown	
7	1	46	"The Ones That Didn't Make It Back Home"	Justin Moore	
2	1	23	"Prayed for You"	Matt Stell	
17	33	43	"Rainbow"	Kacey Musgraves	
10	5	2	"Raised on Country"	Chris Young	
4	1	1	"Rearview Town"	Jason Aldean	
23	26	17	"Rednecker"	Hardy	
20	—	—	"Refrigerator Door"	Luke Combs	
5	1	1	"Remember You Young"	Thomas Rhett	
2	1	11	"Rumor"	Lee Brice	
17	—	—	"Shut Up About Politics"	John Rich featuring The Five	
6	1	1	"Sixteen"	Thomas Rhett	
7	1	3	"Some of It"	Eric Church	
10	—	—	"Soon You'll Get Better"	Taylor Swift featuring Dixie Chicks	
11	3	1	"Southbound"	Carrie Underwood	
4	2	4	"Take It from Me"	Jordan Davis	
11	11	28	"Talk You Out of It"	Florida Georgia Line	
11	3	1	"There Was This Girl"	Riley Green	
3	1	2	"This Is It"	Scotty McCreery	
26	17	50	"Thought About You"	Tim McGraw	
13	8	3	"Tip of My Tongue"	Kenny Chesney	
7	4	1	"We Were"	Keith Urban	
7	1	15	"What Happens in a Small Town"	Brantley Gilbert and Lindsay Ell	
7	2	1	"What Makes You Country"	Luke Bryan	
1	1	1	"Whiskey Glasses"	Morgan Wallen	

=== Singles released by Canadian artists ===
Songs	Airplay	Canada	Single	Artist	References
—	—	12	"#REDNEK"	Gord Bamford	
—	—	1	"About You"	MacKenzie Porter	
—	—	13	"Ain't Gonna Be Lonely Long"	Sons of Daughters	
—	—	15	"Bars & Churches"	Aaron Goodvin	
—	—	3	"Better on You"	Jojo Mason	
—	—	1	"Better When I Do"	Aaron Pritchett	
—	—	5	"Black Sheep"	Dean Brody	
—	—	8	"Cecilia"	Brett Kissel	
—	—	4	"Count the Ways"	Jade Eagleson	
—	—	10	"Dear Me"	Madeline Merlo	
—	—	17	"Didn't Know Me"	Andrew Hyatt	
—	—	4	"Dose of Country"	Dean Brody	
—	—	1	"Drop"	Dallas Smith	
—	—	8	"Down"	Gord Bamford	
—	—	1	"Feels Like That"	Reklaws	
—	—	1	"Forever's Gotta Start Somewhere"	Chad Brownlee	
—	—	2	"Good Jeans"	Tebey	
—	—	10	"Hello Country"	Steven Lee Olsen	
—	—	6	"I Do Too"	Reklaws	
—	—	1	"Keep It Simple"	James Barker Band	
—	—	1	"Lost"	Hunter Brothers	
—	—	17	"Northern Lights"	Hunter Brothers	
—	—	1	"Rhinestone World"	Dallas Smith	
—	—	6	"Save Some of That Whiskey"	Jess Moskaluke	
—	—	16	"She Gets Me"	Washboard Union	
—	—	2	"Single Man"	High Valley	
29	26	1	"Somebody's Daughter"	Tenille Townes	
—	—	2	"There's a Drink for That"	James Barker Band	
—	—	19	"Water Down the Whiskey"	Matt Lang	
—	—	3	"The Way You Roll"	Chad Brownlee	
—	—	1	"What A Song Should Do"	Tim Hicks	
—	—	7	"What Do I Know"	Shawn Austin	
—	—	3	"Whiskey in a Teacup"	Dean Brody	
—	—	8	"White Horse"	Tenille Townes	
—	—	9	"Wild as Me"	Meghan Patrick	
—	—	1	"You Are"	Aaron Goodvin	
—	—	12	"You Belong"	Shawn Austin	

=== Notes ===
- "—" denotes releases that did not chart

== Top new album releases ==
The following albums placed on the Top Country Albums charts in 2019:

US	Album	Artist	Record label	Release date	Reference
1	9	Jason Aldean	Macon Music/Broken Bow Records	November 22	
2	After the Fire	Cody Jinks	Late August Records	October 11	
1	Ain't Nothin' to It	Cody Johnson	CoJo/Warner Music Nashville	January 18	
1	Can't Say I Ain't Country	Florida Georgia Line	BMLG	February 15	
1	Center Point Road	Thomas Rhett	Valory Music Co.	May 31	
1	Country Squire	Tyler Childers	Hickman Holler	August 2	
7	Creeker 2	Upchurch	Redneck Nation	April 19	
4	Dive Bar Saints	Home Free	Home Free	September 6	
9	Elvis: The '68 Comeback Special: The Best of (Soundtrack)	Elvis Presley	RCA Legacy	February 15	
5	Every Girl	Trisha Yearwood	Gwendolyn Records	August 30	
1	Fire & Brimstone	Brantley Gilbert	Big Machine Label Group	October 4	
1	Fully Loaded: God's Country	Blake Shelton	Warner Nashville	December 13	
1	Girl	Maren Morris	Columbia Nashville	March 8	
8	Greetings from... Jake	Jake Owen	Big Loud	March 29	
10	Harold Saul High	Koe Wetzel	Yellabush Records	June 21	
2	Heartache Medication	Jon Pardi	Capitol Nashville	September 27	
1	The Highwomen	The Highwomen	Elektra	September 6	
1	Honky Tonk Time Machine	George Strait	MCA Nashville	March 29	
3	Imperfect Circle	Hootie & the Blowfish	Capitol Nashville	November 1	
2	Late Nights and Longnecks	Justin Moore	Valory Music Co.	July 26	
1	Let It Roll	Midland	Big Machine	August 23	
3	Nothing to Do Town (EP)	Dylan Scott	Curb	April 26	
2	Ocean	Lady Antebellum	Big Machine Label Group	November 15	
9	Okie	Vince Gill	MCA Nashville	August 23	
1	Old Dominion	Old Dominion	Sony Music	October 25	
1	The Owl	Zac Brown Band	BMG	September 20	
6	Parachute	Upchurch	Redneck Nation	September 20	
1	The Prequel	Luke Combs	Columbia Nashville	June 7	
1	Reboot	Brooks & Dunn	Arista Nashville	April 5	
7	Red Bandana	Aaron Watson	Big Label Records	June 21	
2	Ride Me Back Home	Willie Nelson	Legacy	June 21	
3	Sound & Fury	Sturgill Simpson	Elektra	September 27	
2	State I'm In	Aaron Lewis	Valory Music Co.	April 12	
4	Stronger Than the Truth	Reba McEntire	Big Machine	April 5	
2	Threads	Sheryl Crow	Big Machine	August 30	
2	The Wanting	Cody Jinks	Late August Records	October 18	
1	What You See Is What You Get	Luke Combs	River House Artists/Sony Music Entertainment	November 8	
8	While I'm Livin'	Tanya Tucker	Fantasy Records	August 23	
1	Whiskey Myers	Whiskey Myers	Wiggy Thump	September 27	
1	Wildcard	Miranda Lambert	RCA Nashville	November 1	

=== Other top albums ===
US	Album	Artist	Record label	Release date	Reference
31	The Acoustic Sessions (EP)	Brett Young	Republic Nashville	August 16	
12	American Love Song	Ryan Bingham	Thirty Tigers	February 15	
36	Blue Roses	Runaway June	Wheelhouse	June 28	
34	Brothers	LoCash	Wheelhouse	March 29	
28	Caught Up in the Country	Rodney Atkins	Curb	May 10	
33	Country Music: A Film by Ken Burns (Soundtrack)	Various Artists	Legacy	September 13	
11	Different 'Round Here	Riley Green	Big Machine Label Group	September 20	
32	Everywhere But On (EP)	Matt Stell	Arista Nashville	May 24	
48	Fire (EP)	Sister Hazel	Croakin' Poets	February 8	
20	Greatest Hits: The Show Dog Years	Toby Keith	Show Dog-Universal	October 25	
14	Guy	Steve Earle	New West	March 29	
24	Hellbent	Randy Rogers Band	Tommy Jackson Records	April 26	
35	Hixtape, Volume 1	Hardy	Big Loud Records	September 13	
16	Honeysuckle & Lightning Bugs	Blanco Brown	BBR Music Group	October 11	
18	The Legacy Collection	Garth Brooks	Pearl Records	November 1	
11	Magnolia	Randy Houser	Stoney Creek	January 11	
26	Now That's What I Call Country, Volume 12	Various Artists	Universal	March 29	
25	One Light Town	Casey Donahew	Almost Famous	July 26	
12	Real Friends	Chris Janson	Warner Nashville	October 18	
39	Stages	Cassadee Pope	Awake Music	February 1	
26	This Is Eli Young Band: Greatest Hits	Eli Young Band	Valory Music Co.	March 29	
13	Tides of a Teardrop	Mandolin Orange	Yep Roc	February 1	
19	Turn Off the News, Build a Garden	Lukas Nelson & Promise of the Real	Concord Music Group	June 14	
42	We the People, Volume 1	Colt Ford	Average Joes	September 20	
26	What It Is	Hayes Carll	Dualtone	February 15	
44	Wild Blue (Part 1)	Hunter Hayes	Warner Bros. Nashville	August 16	

== Deaths ==
- January 1 – Pegi Young, 66, American singer-songwriter
- January 3 – Steve Ripley, 69, American musician, leader/producer of The Tractors, best known for "Baby Likes to Rock It".
- January 12 – Sanger D. Shafer, 84, American songwriter
- January 12 – Bonnie Guitar, 95, American country-pop artist and record label executive.
- January 17 – Reggie Young, 82, session guitarist
- January 21 – Maxine Brown, 87, final surviving member of The Browns
- January 31 – Harold Bradley, 93, American Hall of Fame country musician.
- February 20 – Fred Foster, 87, record producer and songwriter
- February 24 – Mac Wiseman, 93, bluegrass singer
- April 6 – Jim Glaser, 81, youngest member of Tompall & the Glaser Brothers
- April 10 – Earl Thomas Conley, 77, American singer-songwriter known for hits like "Holding Her and Loving You", "Fire and Smoke", and "Angel in Disguise"
- May 14 – Leon Rausch, 91, member of The Texas Playboys
- June 10 – Chuck Glaser, 83, last surviving member of Tompall and the Glaser Brothers
- July 12 – Russell Smith, 70, American singer-songwriter (Amazing Rhythm Aces).
- August 27 – Donnie Fritts, 76, American session musician and songwriter.
- September 4 – Kylie Rae Harris, 30, Texas country singer-songwriter (car accident)
- September 5 – Jimmy Johnson, 76, American musician (Muscle Shoals Rhythm Section) and record producer.
- September 18 – Chuck Dauphin, 45, American sports radio broadcaster and country music journalist, (complications from diabetes).
- September 29 – busbee, 43, songwriter and producer known for hits such as "Our Kind of Love" and "My Church" (brain cancer)
- October 17 – Bob Kingsley, 80, radio personality and longtime host of American Country Countdown and Bob Kingsley's Country Top 40 (bladder cancer)
- October 20 – Nick Tosches, 69, American journalist, music critic and writer (Country).
- October 22 – Garry Koehler, 64, Australian country musician and songwriter, cancer.
- October 25 – Joe Sun, 76, American singer-songwriter best known for his 1978 hit "Old Flames Can't Hold a Candle to You", which would later become a #1 for Dolly Parton.

== Hall of Fame inductees ==
=== Bluegrass Hall of Fame ===
- Mike Auldridge
- Bill Emerson
- The Kentucky Colonels

=== Country Music Hall of Fame inductees ===
- Jerry Bradley, producer and record executive, son of Owen Bradley and nephew of Harold Bradley.
- Ray Stevens, country pop singer-songwriter and comedian (born 1939).
- Brooks & Dunn, singer-songwriter duo composed of Kix Brooks (born 1955) and Ronnie Dunn (born 1953).

=== Canadian Country Music Hall of Fame inductees ===
- Charlie Major
- Anya Wilson

== Major awards ==
=== Academy of Country Music ===
(presented in Nashville on September 16, 2020)

- Entertainer of the Year – Thomas Rhett and Carrie Underwood
- Male Vocalist of the Year – Luke Combs
- Female Vocalist of the Year – Maren Morris
- Vocal Duo of the Year – Dan + Shay
- Vocal Group of the Year – Old Dominion
- New Male Vocalist of the Year – Riley Green
- New Female Vocalist of the Year – Tenille Townes
- Songwriter of the Year – Hillary Lindsey
- Album of the Year – What You See Is What You Get (Luke Combs)
- Single of the Year – "God's Country" (Blake Shelton)
- Song of the Year – "One Man Band" (Matthew Ramsey, Trevor Rosen, Brad Tursi, Josh Osborne)
- Vocal Event of the Year – "Fooled Around and Fell in Love" (Miranda Lambert featuring Maren Morris, Ashley McBryde, Tenille Townes, Caylee Hammack, and Elle King)
- Video of the Year – "Remember You Young" (Thomas Rhett)

ACM Honors
(presented August 21 in Nashville)

- Cliffie Stone Icon Award – Brooks & Dunn and Martina McBride
- Poet's Award – Rodney Crowell, Kye Fleming and Billy Joe Shaver
- Gary Haber Lifting Lives Award – Gayle Holcomb
- Gene Weed Milestone Award – Miranda Lambert
- Song of the Decade – "The House That Built Me" (awarded to Tom Douglas, Miranda Lambert and Allen Shamblin)
- Songwriter of the Year – Shane McAnally
- Jim Reeves International Award – Kacey Musgraves
- Tex Ritter Film Award – A Star Is Born

=== Americana Music Honors & Awards ===
(presented on September 12, 2019)

- Album of the Year – The Tree of Forgiveness (John Prine)
- Artist of the Year – Brandi Carlile
- Duo/Group of the Year – I'm with Her
- Song of the Year – "Summer's End" (Pat McLaughlin and John Prine)
- Emerging Artist of the Year – The War and Treaty
- Instrumentalist of the Year – Chris Eldridge
- Spirit of Americana/Free Speech Award – Mavis Staples
- Legacy of Americana Award – Rhiannon Giddens and Frank Johnson
- Lifetime Achievement: Trailblazer – Maria Muldaur
- Lifetime Achievement: Performance – Delbert McClinton
- Lifetime Achievement: Songwriting – Elvis Costello
- President's Award – Felice and Boudleaux Bryant

=== American Music Awards ===
- Artist of the Decade – Taylor Swift
- Artist of the Year – Taylor Swift
- Favorite Country Male Artist – Kane Brown
- Favorite Country Female Artist – Carrie Underwood
- American Music Award for Favorite Country Band/Duo/Group – Dan + Shay
- Country Album – Cry Pretty (Carrie Underwood)
- Favorite Country Song – "Speechless" (Dan + Shay, Jordan Reynolds, Laura Veltz)

=== ARIA Awards ===
- Best Country Album – Things That We Drink To (Morgan Evans)

=== Billboard Music Awards ===
- Billboard Music Award for Top Country Artist – Luke Combs
- Top Country Male Artist – Luke Combs
- Top Country Female Artist – Carrie Underwood
- Top Country Duo/Group – Dan + Shay
- Top Country Album – This One's for You (Luke Combs)
- Top Country Song – "Meant to Be" (Bebe Rexha and Florida Georgia Line)
- Top Country Tour – Trip Around the Sun Tour (Kenny Chesney)

=== CMT Awards ===
(presented on June 5, 2019, in Nashville)

- Video of the Year – "Cry Pretty" (Carrie Underwood)
- Male Video of the Year – "Lose It" (Kane Brown)
- Female Video of the Year – "Love Wins" (Carrie Underwood)
- Duo Video of the Year – "Speechless" (Dan + Shay)
- Group Video of the Year – "Someone I Used to Know" (Zac Brown Band)
- Breakthrough Video of the Year – "Girl Going Nowhere" (Live at Marathon) (Ashley McBryde)
- Collaborative Video of the Year – "Coming Home" (Keith Urban ft. Julia Michaels)
- CMT Performance of the Year – "Beautiful Crazy" (Luke Combs and Leon Bridges) from CMT Crossroads

CMT Artists of the Year
(presented October 16, 2019 in Nashville)

- Kane Brown
- Luke Combs
- Dan + Shay
- Thomas Rhett
- Carrie Underwood

=== Country Music Association Awards ===
- Entertainer of the Year – Garth Brooks
- Male Vocalist of the Year – Luke Combs
- Female Vocalist of the Year – Kacey Musgraves
- Vocal Group of the Year – Old Dominion
- New Artist of the Year – Ashley McBryde
- Vocal Duo of the Year – Dan + Shay
- Musician of the Year – Jenee Fleenor (fiddle)
- Single of the Year – "God's Country" (Blake Shelton)
- Song of the Year – "Beautiful Crazy" (Luke Combs, Wyatt Durrette, Robert Williford)
- Album of the Year – Girl (Maren Morris)
- Musical Event of the Year – "Old Town Road" (Lil Nas X and Billy Ray Cyrus)
- Music Video of the Year – "Rainbow" (Kacey Musgraves, directed by Hannah Lux Davis)
- International Artist Achievement Award – Kacey Musgraves
- Jeff Walker Global Country Artist Award – Travis Collins (Australia) and Ward Thomas (UK)

=== Grammy Awards ===
(presented in Los Angeles on January 26, 2020)

- Best Country Solo Performance – "Ride Me Back Home" (Willie Nelson)
- Best Country Duo/Group Performance – "Speechless" (Dan + Shay)
- Best Country Song – "Bring My Flowers Now" (Brandi Carlile, Phil Hanseroth, Tim Hanseroth, Tanya Tucker)
- Best Country Album – ''While I'm Livin' (Tanya Tucker)
- Best Bluegrass Album – Tall Fiddler (Michael Cleveland)
- Best Americana Album – Oklahoma (Keb' Mo')
- Best American Roots Performance – "Saint Honesty" (Sara Bareilles)
- Best American Roots Song – "Call My Name" (Sarah Jarosz, Aoife O'Donovan, Sara Watkins)
- Best Roots Gospel Album – Testimony (Gloria Gaynor)

=== International Bluegrass Music Association Awards ===
(presented on September 26, 2019)

- Entertainer of the Year – Joe Mullins and the Radio Ramblers
- Male Vocalist of the Year – Russell Moore
- Female Vocalist of the Year – Brooke Aldridge
- Vocal Group of the Year – Sister Sadie
- Instrumental Group of the Year – Michael Cleveland and Flamekeeper
- New Artist of the Year – Billy Strings
- Guitar Player of the Year – Billy Strings
- Banjo Player of the Year – Kristin Scott Benson
- Mandolin Player of the Year – Alan Bibey
- Fiddle Player of the Year – Michael Cleveland
- Bass Player of the Year – Missy Raines
- Dobro Player of the Year – Phil Leadbetter
- Album of the Year – Del McCoury Still Sings Bluegrass (Del McCoury)
- Song of the Year – "Thunder Dan" (Sideline)
- Collaborative Recording of the Year – "The Guitar Song" (Joe Mullins and the Radio Ramblers with Del McCoury)
- Instrumental Recorded Performance of the Year – "Darlin' Pals of Mine" (Missy Raines ft. Alison Brown, Mike Bub and Todd Phillips)
- Gospel Recorded Performance of the Year – "Gonna Sing, Gonna Shout" (Claire Lynch)

=== Juno Awards ===
(presented on June 29, 2020)

- Country Album of the Year – Wild As Me (Meghan Patrick)
- Contemporary Roots Album of the Year – Mohawk (Lee Harvey Osmond)
- Traditional Roots Album of the Year - Sugar & Joy (The Dead South)

=== Kennedy Center Honors ===
Country stars who were honored in 2019

Linda Ronstadt

== See also ==
- Country Music Association
- Inductees of the Country Music Hall of Fame
