= Jennifer Wayne =

American singer and songwriter (born 1982)

- Born: Jennifer Anne Kuhle; April 1, 1982 (age 44); Orange, California, U.S.
- Occupations: Singer; songwriter; television personality; actress; businesswoman
- Years active: 2007–present
- Known for: Stealing Angels (2007–2012); Runaway June (2015–present)
- Spouse: Austin Moody (m. 2021)
- Children: 1
- Relatives: John Wayne (maternal grandfather); Pilar Pallete (maternal grandmother); Ethan Wayne (uncle); Michael Wayne (half-uncle); Patrick Wayne (half-uncle)

Signature
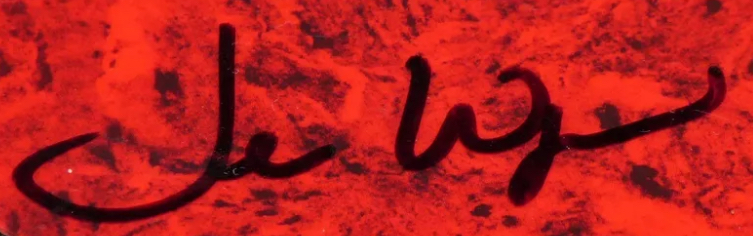

Jennifer Anne Moody (née Kuhle; born April 1, 1982), known professionally as Jennifer Wayne, is an American singer, songwriter, television personality, actress, and businesswoman. She is best known as a member of the country trio Stealing Angels (2007–2012) and the country music group Runaway June (2015–present).

== Early life ==
Jennifer Anne Kuhle was born in Orange, California on April 1, 1982, as the elder child and only daughter to Earl Lawrence Kuhle II and his wife, Aissa (née Wayne; born 1956). She has a younger brother, Nicholas Lawrence Kuhle (born 1983), and a half-sister, Anastasia Pilar Cadwell (née Gionis; born 1987), from her mother's second marriage. Her parents divorced when she was two-years-old. She was raised by her father.

Wayne is the granddaughter of John Wayne, an actor, who died two years and ten months before her birth. Her maternal grandmother is Pilar Pallete, a Peruvian-American former actress. Her uncles are Michael Wayne, Patrick Wayne and Ethan Wayne.

== Career ==
Wayne made her debut as a member of the country trio Stealing Angels in 2007. The band was founded when Wayne, Caroline Cutbirth, and Tayla Lynn, were recruited for a reality television series titled All in the Genes, which would focus on the ups and downs of the descendants of famous relatives; Wayne is John Wayne's granddaughter, Cutbirth is a descendant of Daniel Boone, and Tayla Lynn is the granddaughter of Loretta Lynn. Wayne was a tennis player in her childhood, and was signed to a label founded by Merv Griffin, but this deal was canceled after Griffin's 2007 death. She met Cutbirth in Nashville, Tennessee, in 2007, and the two later met Lynn when the three were asked to participate in a reality television series focusing on the three girls' ancestry. Although the show was never produced, the three began performing together and named themselves Stealing Angels. The trio signed to Skyville Records, a label founded by record producer Paul Worley. Their debut single, "He Better Be Dead", debuted at number 59 on the U.S. Billboard Hot Country Songs chart for the week of July 17, 2010, and reached a peak of number 48 on the chart. Their second single, "Paper Heart", was released in May 2011 and reached a peak of number 59 after two weeks on the chart. "Little Blue Sky" was released as their third single in November 2011, though it failed to chart. In a cast interview in 2012, both Wayne and Cutbirth confirmed that the band had parted ways.

Wayne appeared as a contestant on the twenty-second season of the CBS reality competition series The Amazing Race, which was filmed between November 13, 2012 and December 7, 2012, and was broadcast between February 17, 2013 and May 5, 2013, alongside Cutbirth. Wayne and Cutbirth were eliminated eighth in Belfast, Northern Ireland.

Wayne and Cutbirth returned for the twenty-fourth season of The Amazing Race, The Amazing Race: All-Stars, which was filmed between November 16, 2013 and December 6, 2013, and was broadcast between February 23, 2014 and May 18, 2014. Wayne and Cutbirth finished as the runners-up.

Wayne made her debut as an actress with the role of Amy in the Christian drama film Like a Country Song, starring Billy Ray Cyrus and Jennifer Taylor. The film was released on September 9, 2014.

Wayne and Eric Paslay co-wrote Paslay's top 20 hit "She Don't Love You". The song was released on October 13, 2014.

Wayne has been a member of the country music group Runaway June since the group's debut in 2015. Under the original lineup, she was the high harmony vocalist and guitar player, Naomi Cooke was the lead vocalist, and Hannah Mulholland was the low harmony vocalist and mandolin player. The three met in Nashville and wrote their debut single "Lipstick" with assistance from Rebecca Lynn Howard, Caroline Hobby (a former member of Stealing Angels), and Elisha Hoffman. The song was released in 2016 via Broken Bow Records' Wheelhouse Records imprint. They released their self-titled debut EP in September 2018, which featured the singles "Wild West" and "But My Own Drinks". The group was a supporting act for Carrie Underwood on her Cry Pretty Tour 360, which ran from May 1, 2019 to October 31, 2019, alongside Maddie & Tae. On May 23, 2019, the group announced their debut album Blue Roses, which was released on June 28, 2019. "Buy My Own Drinks", which served as the lead-off single, is included on the album alongside three other songs from their previous EP release. The album debuted at No. 36 on the Top Country Albums chart, and No. 2 on the Heatseekers Album chart. After "Buy My Own Drinks", the band also charted two more singles from the album, "Head over Heels" and "We Were Rich". On May 14, 2019, Mulholland announced that she was leaving the group. The next day, the other two members confirmed that she was replaced by Natalie Stovall, the former lead singer of Natalie Stovall and the Drive, who also plays the fiddle for the group. This was followed in February 2022 by Cooke's departure from the band. Cooke was replaced by Stevie Woodward two months later. In 2023, Runaway June signed with Quartz Hill Records and released "Make Me Wanna Smoke" as their first single under the new label.

Wayne co-wrote Keith Urban's hit "Wild Hearts", with Brad Tursi, Eric Paslay and Urban. The song was released on August 19, 2021. She is also credited as backing vocals.

Wayne co-founded the American Paint Hat Co., a company that specializes in custom-designed cowboy hats, in December 2021, alongside Tyler Minor, Tara Joseph and Sydni Joseph.

Wayne appeared on The John Wayne Gritcast podcast series, where she was interviewed by her maternal uncle, Ethan Wayne. The episode, "Episode 18 – Jennifer Wayne", was released on February 3, 2022.

Wayne signed a publishing deal with Concord Music Publishing on November 15, 2022. The deal will cover her future works.

Wayne and Cutbirth appeared as clue givers during the finale episode in the thirty-fourth season of The Amazing Race. The episode, "The Only Leg That Matters", was broadcast on December 7, 2022.

Wayne appeared on The Design Network's 2023 reality television series Flip U with Brad Rempel.

== Personal life ==
Wayne met her future husband, Austin Moody, a singer-songwriter, at Ocean Way Studios in Nashville, Tennessee in 2015. He proposed to her outside the Nashville recording studio on December 28, 2020 and the couple were married in Santa Rosa Beach, Florida on January 9, 2021, in a beach ceremony with a 'Western flair'. On November 5, 2021, it was reported that she was expecting the couple's first child, due in April 2022. She gave birth to a baby girl in 2022. The family resides in Nashville. Wayne and Moody have since divorced.

== Filmography ==
=== As herself ===
Year	Title	Notes	Ref.
2013–2014, 2022	The Amazing Race	24 episodes	
2014	Stable Wars: Del Mar	2 episodes	
2015	Music City USA		
2015–2016	I Love Kellie Pickler	4 episodes	
2017	Who is Runaway June?		
2019	Entertainment Tonight Canada	Episode: "7/8/2019"	
2023	Flip U		

=== As an actress ===
Year	Title	Role	Notes	Ref.
2014	Like a Country Song	Amy	Credited as; Jennifer Kuhle	
