= Me (RaeLynn EP) =

2015 EP by RaeLynn

EP by RaeLynn
- Released: January 13, 2015
- Genre: Country; country pop
- Length: 16:21
- Label: Valory Music Group
- Producer: Joey Moi

RaeLynn chronology
Me (2015)	WildHorse (2017)

Singles from Me
- 1. "Boyfriend" Released: December 17, 2012; 2. "God Made Girls" Released: June 30, 2014

Me is the debut EP by American singer RaeLynn, released on January 13, 2015.

== Track listing ==
No.	Title	Writer(s)	Length
1.	"God Made Girls"	RaeLynn; Nicolle Galyon; Lori McKenna; Liz Rose	3:34
2.	"Kissin' Frogs"	RaeLynn; Shane McAnally; Jimmy Robbins	3:54
3.	"Careless"	RaeLynn; Kara DioGuardi; Jon Nite; Robbins	3:21
4.	"Boyfriend"	RaeLynn; Nicolle Galyon; Hailey Steele	2:29
5.	"Better Do It"	RaeLynn; Barry Dean; Luke Laird	3:03

== Chart performance ==
Chart (2015)	Peak position
US Billboard 200	49
US Top Country Albums (Billboard)	7
