= Good Goodbye =

Good Goodbye may refer to:

- "Good Goodbye" (Linkin Park song) (2017)
- "Good Goodbye" (Dean Brody song) (2018)
- "Good Goodbye" (Hwasa song) (2025)
