= God Made Girls =

Single by RaeLynn

from the album Me
- Released: June 30, 2014
- Genre: Country pop
- Length: 3:34
- Label: Valory Music Group
- Songwriters: RaeLynn; Nicolle Galyon; Lori McKenna; Liz Rose
- Producer: Joey Moi

RaeLynn singles chronology
"Boyfriend" (2012)	"God Made Girls" (2014)	"For a Boy" (2015)

"God Made Girls" is a song recorded by American country music artist RaeLynn. It was released to country radio on June 30, 2014. RaeLynn co-wrote the song with Nicolle Galyon, Lori McKenna and Liz Rose.

== Critical reception ==
Billy Dukes of Taste of Country gave the song a favorable review, writing that "RaeLynn holds back sassy, but still injects plenty of personality into her sweet single" and her "interpretation is emotional from start to finish." Dukes added that "RaeLynn's vocal stylings aren't for everyone, but the producer of this track smartly paired her with a traditional arrangement." Matt Bjorke of Roughstock also reviewed the song favorably, saying that "the production, from Joey Moi, gives the song a contemporary feel while RaeLynn's Texas twang reminds us that RaeLynn's no pop singer." Bjorke went on to say "the track features strong lyrics about what Girls do to make the world go round, how they start flirting with a shy guy, all the great qualities about a girl that makes guys go insane." Markos Papadatos of Digital Journal gave the song an A rating, writing that "she has a little Miranda Lambert in her voice, coupled by her sweet twang. She has found a way to blend traditional country music with modern country on this new tune, and it works effectively."

== Music video ==
The music video was directed by TK McKamy and premiered in August 2014. It was filmed in Columbia, Tennessee.

== Chart performance ==
"God Made Girls" debuted at number 56 on the U.S. Billboard Country Airplay chart for the week of July 19, 2014. It also debuted at number 34 on the U.S. Billboard Hot Country Songs chart for the week of July 19, 2014. The song debuted at number 98 on the Billboard Hot 100, and peaked at number 61. The single was certified Gold by the RIAA on January 29, 2015. It has sold 481,000 copies in the U.S. as of February 2015.

Chart (2014–2015)	Peak position
Canada Hot 100 (Billboard)	100
Canada Country (Billboard)	42
US Billboard Hot 100	61
US Country Airplay (Billboard)	16
US Hot Country Songs (Billboard)	7
US Country Digital Songs (Billboard)	1

=== Year-end charts ===
Chart (2014)	Position
US Country Airplay (Billboard)	88
US Hot Country Songs (Billboard)	80

Chart (2015)	Position
US Country Airplay (Billboard)	84
US Hot Country Songs (Billboard)	75

== Certifications ==
Region	Certification	Certified units/sales
United States (RIAA)	Platinum	1,000,000^{‡}
^{‡} Sales+streaming figures based on certification alone.
