= Lonely Call =

Single by RaeLynn

Single by RaeLynn

from the album WildHorse
- Released: June 26, 2017
- Genre: Country
- Length: 3:44
- Label: Warner Music Nashville
- Songwriters: RaeLynn; Nicolle Galyon; Rob Hawkins
- Producers: Jimmy Robbins; Galyon

RaeLynn singles chronology
"Love Triangle" (2016)	"Lonely Call" (2017)	"Queens Don't" (2018)

"Lonely Call" is a song by American singer and songwriter RaeLynn. It was released on June 26, 2017, as the second single from her debut studio album, WildHorse (2017). The song was written by RaeLynn, Nicolle Galyon, and Rob Hawkins.

== Background ==
In an interview with Sounds Like Nashville, RaeLynn explained the song:

"It's funny, because I actually wrote this song about my husband. We dated when I was 18 for like, 10 months, and then we broke up for two years and got back together. So anyway, when we broke up, you know, when you first break up, you're still so in love. I've never fallen out of love with Josh, let me rephrase that. You talk every day, so you have to get used to not being 'together'. So the first time he called me, and it was late and we weren't dating anymore, I wanted to answer so bad. I think the first time I did, and then the next time he called again, I was like, I just can't keep doing this. I can't be his lonely call. I can't do this."

She also said in an interview with Rolling Stone Country:

"'Lonely Call' is a confessional. My WildHorse record is like my diary. It's so funny to listen back because I was so sad when we broke up, when I hear those lyrics I'm like, 'That's exactly how it felt, that's exactly how it was.'

== Critical reception ==
Taste of Country's Sterling Whitaker said "musically the track is an amalgam of sweet pop-country melodicism and some surprisingly traditional instruments, with a reverb-drenched banjo and simple acoustic guitars framing the gentle, moody verse before stacked guitars lift the song up into a sweeping chorus. RaeLynn's uniquely smoky vocal tone is perfectly suited to the aching, regretful subject matter that she's delivering, and the result is a track that is so universally identifiable that it could very well carry her career to new heights at country radio." Liv Stecker of The Boot stated "an echoing reflection, the song tells the story of a girl who has gone from a place of importance in a relationship to an afterthought. In her relatable style, RaeLynn captures the struggle that comes with not settling for less than you should, and the will power that it sometimes takes to make that choice." Paste's Robert Ham labeled it a "defiant kiss off to a mercurial lover."

== Charts ==
Chart (2017)	Peak position
US Hot Country Songs (Billboard)	50

== Certifications ==
Certifications for Lonely Call
Region	Certification	Certified units/sales
United States (RIAA)	Gold	500,000^{‡}
^{‡} Sales+streaming figures based on certification alone.

== Release history ==
Region	Date	Format	Label	Ref.
United States	June 26, 2017	Country radio	Warner Music Nashville	
