= Boyfriend (RaeLynn song) =

Single by RaeLynn

from the album Me
- Released: December 17, 2012
- Genre: Country; country pop
- Length: 2:29
- Label: Independent
- Songwriter(s): RaeLynn; Nicolle Galyon; Hailey Steele
- Producer(s): Joey Moi

RaeLynn singles chronology
"Boyfriend" (2012)	"God Made Girls" (2014)

"Boyfriend" is a song co-written and recorded by American country music artist RaeLynn. It was released on December 17, 2012 as her debut single.

== Critical reception ==
Billy Dukes of Taste of Country gave the song a four-star review, saying "Don’t trust that grapefruit-sized flower growing from RaeLynn‘s platinum blonde hair. This girl and her first single ‘Boyfriend’ are absolute country trouble with a capital “T.” But rarely has trouble sounded this much fun."

== Chart performance ==
Chart (2012–13)	Peak position
Canada (Canadian Hot 100)	92
US Bubbling Under Hot 100 Singles (Billboard)	18
US Hot Country Songs (Billboard)	32
