= Female (song) =

Single by Keith Urban

from the album Graffiti U
- Released: 8 November 2017
- Recorded: 2017
- Genre: Country pop
- Length: 3:14
- Label: Hit Red; Capitol Nashville
- Songwriters: Shane McAnally; Ross Copperman; Nicolle Galyon
- Producers: Keith Urban; Ross Copperman; Dann Huff

Keith Urban singles chronology
| "The Fighter" (2017) | "Female" (2017) | "Parallel Line" (2018) |

"Female" is a song written by Shane McAnally, Nicolle Galyon, and Ross Copperman and recorded by Australian and American country music artist Keith Urban. It was released in November 2017 as the first single from Urban's 2018 album Graffiti U. Urban debuted the song live on the 51st Annual Country Music Association Awards that same day.

== Content ==
The song, which was written in early October 2017, has been described as "an empowerment anthem partially inspired by the Harvey Weinstein scandal." Urban said of the song that "as a husband and a father of two young girls, it affects me in a lot of ways. And as a son -- my mother is alive. It just speaks to all of the females in my life, particularly. For a guy who grew up with no sisters in a house of boys, it's incredible how now I'm surrounded by girls. But not only in my house; I employ a huge amount of women in my team. The song just hit me for so many reasons."

Urban's then-wife Nicole Kidman and song co-writer Nicolle Galyon provided background vocals on the track.

== Chart performance ==
"Female" was the best-selling country song on the week of its debut, with 21,000 copies sold based on only a couple of days sales after its release, and entered the Hot Country Songs chart at number 21. The following week, the single debuted at number 69 on the US Billboard Hot 100, selling 32,000 copies. As of March 2018, the single has sold 163,000 copies in the US. On August 16, 2019, the single was certified gold by the Recording Industry Association of America (RIAA) for combined sales and streaming data of over 500,000 units in the United States.

Reaching a peak of number 12 on the Billboard Country Airplay charts, "Female" became Urban's first single to miss the Top 10 since his mainstream debut, "It's a Love Thing," from 1999, ending a streak of 37 top ten hits. With a peak of #69 on the Hot 100, it was also his lowest charting appearance there at the time of its release.

== Charts ==
=== Weekly charts ===
| Chart (2017–2018) | Peak position |
|---|---|
| Australia (ARIA) | 55 |
| Canada (Canadian Hot 100) | 71 |
| Canada Country (Billboard) | 3 |
| US Billboard Hot 100 | 69 |
| US Country Airplay (Billboard) | 12 |
| US Hot Country Songs (Billboard) | 11 |

=== Year-end charts ===
| Chart (2018) | Position |
|---|---|
| US Country Airplay (Billboard) | 58 |
| US Hot Country Songs (Billboard) | 56 |

== Certifications ==
| Region | Certification | Certified units/sales |
|---|---|---|
| Australia (ARIA) | Gold | 35,000^{‡} |
| United States (RIAA) | Gold | 500,000^{‡} |
^{‡} Sales+streaming figures based on certification alone.
