= RaeLynn =

American singer-songwriter (born 1994)

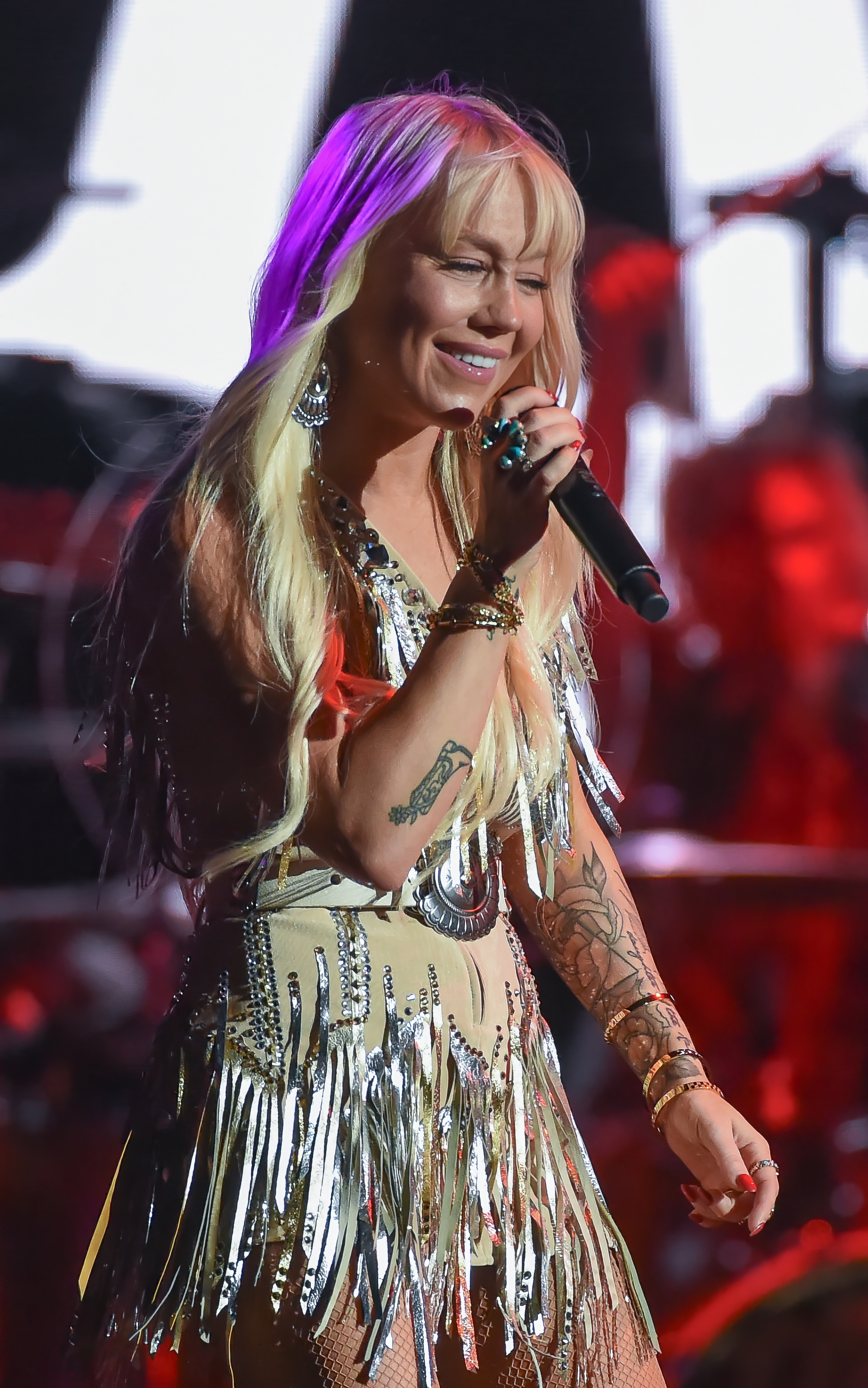
- RaeLynn in 2025

Background information
- Born: Racheal Lynn Woodward; May 4, 1994 (age 32); Baytown, Texas, U.S.
- Genres: Country
- Occupations: Singer; songwriter
- Instruments: Vocals; guitar
- Years active: 2012–present
- Labels: Round Here; AWAL; Valory; Warner Nashville
- Spouse: Joshua Davis (m. 2016; sep. 2026)
- Website: raelynn.com

Racheal Lynn Woodward (born May 4, 1994), better known as RaeLynn, is an American singer and songwriter who was a contestant on The Voice in season two (2012). She was eliminated in the quarterfinals.

== Early life ==
RaeLynn was born and raised in Baytown, Texas, and at age 15 wanted a career in music. She graduated high school early, in 2010.

== Career ==
=== 2012: The Voice ===
RaeLynn auditioned for the second season of The Voice after being encouraged by a contestant on Team Adam who wrote songs with her. Her audition song was "Hell on Heels" by Pistol Annies, Miranda Lambert's group. Both Adam Levine and Blake Shelton wanted her on their team, but she eventually chose Team Blake. She sang "Free Fallin'" against Adley Stump in the Battle Rounds and won. Her victory was, however, highly contested, and Blake publicly defended his choice in a Twitter war. She then went on to the live shows to perform "Wake Up Call" by Maroon 5 and "She's Country" by Jason Aldean and the latter later became her best selling cover on the show. For her last-chance performance, she sang "If I Die Young" by The Band Perry, but was not chosen over Erin Willett and thus eliminated.

==== Performances on The Voice ====
Episode	Song	Order	Result
Blind Audition	"Hell on Heels"	1	Adam Levine and Blake Shelton turned RaeLynn chose Blake Shelton
Battle Round	"Free Fallin'" (vs. Adley Stump)	2	Saved by Blake Shelton
Live Show 1	"Wake Up Call"	3	Saved (public vote)
Quarter-finals (first week)	"She's Country"	1	Bottom 2 (Eliminated by Blake Shelton)
Last Chance Performances	"If I Die Young"	4	Bottom 2 (Eliminated by Blake Shelton)

=== 2012–2018: After The Voice and WildHorse ===
As of 2012, she was signed to Republic Nashville. She has written songs with Natalie Hemby, Jon Randall, John Wiggins, and fellow Voice contestants Nicolle Galyon and Hailey Steele.

She has performed a song co-written with Miranda Lambert entitled "Lie", and returned with fellow finalists Chris Mann and Juliet Simms to perform at the semi-final results show on the third season of The Voice, performing her new single, "Boyfriend". "Boyfriend" later charted on the Bubbling Under Hot 100 Singles chart, which acts as a 25-song extension to the Hot 100, thus making her the first contestant to chart on one of Billboard's overall singles charts for post-Voice activity. The single sold 27,000 copies in its debut week.

She performed backing vocals for Blake Shelton's 2013 single, "Boys 'Round Here", which debuted at No. 67 on the U.S. Billboard Hot 100 chart, and peaked at No. 16. The song is also featured on Shelton's album, Based on a True Story…. She was signed to Dr. Luke's publishing label Prescription Songs in April 2013.

RaeLynn's debut single to country radio, "God Made Girls", was released on July 1, 2014. On December 2, 2014, she performed her single on season seven of The Voice. It went on to be a Top 10 hit on the Billboard Hot Country Songs chart and a Top 20 hit on the Billboard Country Airplay charts, and was certified Gold by the RIAA. On January 13, 2015, RaeLynn released an EP through Valory Music Co. titled Me, which debuted at No. 49 on the Billboard 200, and No. 7 on the Top Country Albums chart, with 5,500 copies sold in its first week. "For a Boy" was released on March 23, 2015 as RaeLynn's second single to country radio. It was less successful than its predecessor and a year later, in April 2016, it was announced that RaeLynn had parted ways with Valory Music Co., leaving her debut album delayed until 2017.

On June 7, 2016, it was announced that RaeLynn had signed a new record deal with Warner Bros. Nashville. "Love Triangle" was released on July 11, 2016 as her first single for the label. It served as the lead-off to her debut album, WildHorse, which was released on March 24, 2017. Sounds Like Nashville praised RaeLynn's "standout debut" and called its lead single, "Love Triangle", "country music storytelling at its finest and country radio is better because of it."

WildHorse landed within the Top 10 on Billboard's All-Genre Album Sales Chart and debuted at No.1 on the Billboard Country Albums Chart, marking the first female country artist to do so since Maren Morris' debut HERO.

=== 2019–2024: Label change ===
On November 8, 2019, she released the single "Bra Off" and announced that she had signed to Florida Georgia Line's Round Here Records. "Keep Up" followed in February 2020, and was sent to country radio as her first single under the label in April 2020. Her second studio album, Baytown, was released on September 21, 2021.

A third studio album, titled Funny Girl, was originally intended to be self-released in 2023, though it ultimately went unreleased.

=== 2025–present: Return to Valory ===
On April 28, 2025, RaeLynn announced her return to Valory, her former record label that she began her career with. Her first single release under the label following her re-signing, "Heaven Is a Honky Tonk", will be released on May 9, 2025. RaeLynn co-wrote the song with Lauren Hungate and Caroline Watkins, and it was produced by Aaron Gillespie of the band Underoath.

RaeLynn will support Jason Aldean on his Full Throttle Tour 2025 that kicks off May 23, 2025.

== Personal life ==
In October 2015, RaeLynn became engaged to then-financial advisor Joshua Davis. They were married on February 27, 2016. A year after their wedding, RaeLynn revealed that Davis had enlisted in the military. In May 2021, the couple announced that they were expecting their first child, a daughter, who was born later that year. In July 2026, she filed for divorce from Davis citing irreconcilable differences.

RaeLynn has type 1 diabetes.

== Discography ==
=== Studio albums ===
Title	Album details	Peak chart positions			Sales
Title	Album details	US Country	US	CAN	Sales
WildHorse	Released: March 24, 2017; Label: Warner Music Nashville; Formats: CD, digital download	1	20	36	US: 125,000
Baytown	Released: September 24, 2021; Label: Round Here; Formats: CD, Digital download	—	—	—	

=== Compilation albums ===
Title	Album details
Origins	Released: September 7, 2018; Label: Big Machine Label Group, LLC; Formats: CD, digital download

=== Extended plays ===
Title	Extended play details	Peak chart positions		Sales
Title	Extended play details	US Country	US	Sales
Me	Released: January 13, 2015; Label: Big Machine Records; Formats: Digital download	7	49	US: 13,100
Baytown	Released: August 14, 2020; Label: Round Here; Formats: Digital download	—	—	

=== Singles ===
Year	Title	Peak chart positions					Certifications	Album
Year	Title	US Country	US Country Airplay	US	CAN Country	CAN	Certifications	Album
2012	"Boyfriend"	32	—	— (Note: "Boyfriend" did not enter the Hot 100, but peaked at number 18 on Bubbling Under Hot 100 Singles, which acts as a 25-song extension of the Hot 100.)	—	92		Me
2014	"God Made Girls"	7	16	61	42	100	RIAA: Platinum	Me
2015	"For a Boy"	32	58	— (Note: "For a Boy" did not enter the Hot 100, but peaked at number 15 on Bubbling Under Hot 100 Singles, which acts as a 25-song extension of the Hot 100.)	—	—		Non-album single
2016	"Love Triangle"	27	26	—	—	—		WildHorse
2017	"Lonely Call"	50	—	—	—	—		WildHorse
2018	"Queens Don't"	40	—	—	—	—		Non-album singles
2018	"Tailgate"	—	—	—	—	—		Non-album singles
2020	"Keep Up"	—	—	—	—	—		Baytown
2021	"Small Town Prayer"	—	—	—	—	—		Baytown
2022	"Raisin' Me a Country Girl"	—	—	—	—	—		Funny Girl
2023	"Broken One"	—	—	—	—	—		Funny Girl
"—" denotes releases that did not chart

==== Single releases from The Voice ====
Year	Title	Peak positions
Year	Title	US Country Digital
2012	"Hell on Heels"	—
2012	"Free Fallin'"	—
2012	"Wake Up Call"	36
2012	"She's Country"	25
"—" denotes releases that did not chart

=== Other charted songs ===
Year	Title	Peak positions	Album
Year	Title	US Country Digital	Album
2016	"WildHorse"	29	WildHorse
2016	"Diamonds"	48	WildHorse

=== Guest appearances ===
Year	Title	Peak chart positions					Album
Year	Title	US Country	US Country Airplay	US	CAN Country	CAN	Album
2013	"Boys 'Round Here" (Blake Shelton featuring Pistol Annies and Friends)	2	1	12	1	12	Based on a True Story…
2014	"Buzzin" (Blake Shelton featuring RaeLynn)	44	—	—	—	—	Bringing Back the Sunshine
2020	"Chase Me Down" (Chris Tomlin featuring RaeLynn)	—	—	—	—	—	Chris Tomlin & Friends

=== Music videos ===
Year	Title	Director
2014	"God Made Girls"	TK McKamy
2015	"For a Boy"	TK McKamy
2016	"Love Triangle"	TK McKamy
2017	"Lonely Call"	TK McKamy
2018	"Queens Don't"	Sean Hagwell
2018	"Tailgate"	P. Tracy
2019	"Bra Off"	Greyland
2020	"Keep Up"	
2023	"It's Happening Right Here"	
2023	"Broken One"	
2023	"What's Wrong with That?"	

== Tours ==
- 2015: Platinum Tour (opening for Miranda Lambert)
- 2015: Roadside Bars & Pink Guitars Tour (opening for Miranda Lambert)
- 2015: Riot Tour (opening for Rascal Flatts)
- 2016: Blake Shelton 2016 Tour (opening for Blake Shelton)
- 2017: Doing It to Country Songs Tour (opening for Blake Shelton)
- 2019: Girl: The World Tour (opening for Maren Morris, European leg only)
- 2024: In The Air Tour (opening for Kane Brown)

== Television ==
Year	Title	Role	Notes
2015	I Didn't Do It	Herself	Episode: "Cheer Up Girls"
2016	Smoky Mountains Rise: A Benefit for the My People Fund	Herself	Special
2017	Nashville	Herself	Episode: "'Til I Can Make It On My Own"
2020	A Nashville Christmas Carol	Alexis	Television film (Hallmark)

== Awards and nominations ==
Year	Association	Category	Nominated work / nominee	Result	Ref
2015	CMT Music Awards	Breakthrough Video of the Year	"God Made Girls"	Nominated	
2015	CMT Music Awards	Female Video of the Year	"God Made Girls"	Nominated	
2016	Academy of Country Music	New Female Vocalist of the Year	RaeLynn	Nominated	
2016	Radio Disney Music Awards	Country Favorite Song	"God Made Girls"	Nominated	
2017	Radio Disney Music Awards	Country Best New Artist	RaeLynn	Nominated	
2017	CMT Music Awards	Breakthrough Video of the Year	"Love Triangle"	Nominated	
