= Black Sheep (EP) =

EP by Dean Brody
- Released: April 26, 2019
- Genre: Country
- Length: 20:54
- Labels: Open Road; Scurvy Dog
- Producer: Matt Rovey

Dean Brody chronology
Beautiful Freakshow (2016)	Black Sheep (2019)	Boys (2020)

Singles from Black Sheep
- 1. "Good Goodbye" Released: May 25, 2018; 2. "Dose of Country" Released: October 10, 2018; 3. "Whiskey in a Teacup" Released: March 8, 2019; 4. "Black Sheep" Released: August 21, 2019

Black Sheep is an EP by Canadian country music artist Dean Brody. It was released on June 21, 2019, via Open Road Recordings and Scurvy Dog Music. It includes the platinum-certified "Whiskey in a Teacup", and the singles "Good Goodbye", "Dose of Country", and "Black Sheep".

== Singles ==
"Good Goodbye" was released as the debut single off the EP in May 2018, and peaked at #6 on the Canadian country radio chart.

"Dose of Country" was released as the second single to radio in October 2018. It peaked at #4 on Canadian country radio.

"Whiskey in a Teacup" was released as the third single to radio in March 2019. It peaked at #3 on Canadian country radio, and at #69 on the Canadian Hot 100. It was certified Platinum by Music Canada.

"Black Sheep" was released as the fourth single in August 2019, and it peaked at #5 on Canadian country radio.

== Track listing ==
All tracks are written by Dean Brody.

No.	Title	Length
1.	"Black Sheep"	3:16
2.	"Whiskey in a Teacup"	3:02
3.	"Moonlight Girl"	3:24
4.	"Good Goodbye"	3:44
5.	"Ever After"	3:43
6.	"Dose of Country"	3:41
Total length:		20:54

== Charts ==
Chart performance for singles from Black Sheep
Year	Single	Peak chart positions		Certifications
Year	Single	CAN Country	CAN	Certifications
2018	"Good Goodbye"	6	— (Note: "Good Goodbye" did not enter the Canadian Hot 100, but peaked at number 40 on the Hot Canadian Digital Song Sales chart.)	MC: Gold
2018	"Dose of Country"	4	—	
2019	"Whiskey in a Teacup"	3	69	MC: Platinum
2019	"Black Sheep"	5	—	

== Awards and nominations ==
Year	Association	Category	Result	Ref.
2020	Juno Awards of 2020	Country Album of the Year – Black Sheep	Nominated	

== Release history ==
Release formats for Black Sheep
Country	Date	Format	Label	Ref.
Various	April 26, 2019	Digital download	Open Road Recordings; Scurvy Dog Music	
Various	April 26, 2019	Streaming	Open Road Recordings; Scurvy Dog Music	
Various	August 30, 2019	Compact disc	Open Road Recordings; Scurvy Dog Music	
