= Graffiti U =

Studio album by Keith Urban
- Released: 27 April 2018
- Recorded: 2017–18, Nashville, Tennessee
- Genre: Country pop
- Length: 52:00
- Label: Hit Red; Capitol Nashville
- Producer: Benny Blanco; Ross Copperman; Captain Cuts; Mike Elizondo; Jason Evigan; Oscar Holter; Dann Huff; Josh Kerr; Ian Kirkpatrick; Johnny McDaid; Matt Rad; Jimmy Robbins; J.R. Rotem; Jesse Shatkin; Ed Sheeran; Keith Urban; Greg Wells

Keith Urban chronology
Ripcord (2016)	Graffiti U (2018)	The Speed of Now Part 1 (2020)

Singles from Graffiti U
- 1. "Female" Released: 8 November 2017; 2. "Parallel Line" Released: 18 January 2018; 3. "Coming Home" Released: 21 March 2018; 4. "Never Comin' Down" Released: 31 August 2018

Graffiti U is the tenth studio album by Australian and American country music singer Keith Urban. It was released on 27 April 2018, through Hit Red and Capitol Records Nashville. The album was heavily influenced by experiences from Urban's youth, and includes the singles "Female", "Parallel Line", "Coming Home" (featuring Julia Michaels), and "Never Comin' Down". The album received mixed reviews from critics but received a nomination for CMA Award for Album of the Year.

== Background ==
Keith Urban said that his first influences were records made by such artists as Johnny Cash, Charley Pride, and Merle Haggard that his father collected. After quitting school at age 15, he performed in cover bands that played a variety of musical styles. Urban also explained that Graffiti U was a combination of those styles he performed during his youth and listened to in his father's record collection.

Graffiti U is neither a song title nor a lyric on the record, but rather a phrase that Urban had come up with. The word "graffiti" came to him while he was working the album, because the process was like graffiti for him. "I have always loved that word, loved the sound of the word, and have loved that it's art-driven," he said. Urban added that "graffiti is free and pure, and very personal" and said, "I thought that this record feels like that to me." He also mentioned that the "U" part was "[both] the audience [and] the listener".

== Promotion ==
The song "Female" was performed live during the 2017 CMA Awards. Urban also performed. On 23 April, he performed the song at a Spotify "Fans First" event in Nashville, Tennessee along with "Parallel Line" and "Wasted Time", from his previous album Ripcord. At the event, he took questions from fans and displayed murals created by five local artists inspired by songs from the album.

== Singles ==
"Female" was released as the album's lead single on 8 November 2017. It was inspired by the Me Too movement. It reached number 12 on the US Billboard Country Airplay chart, his first single to miss the top 10 since his 1999 hit "It's a Love Thing". "Parallel Line" was released as the album's second single on 18 January 2018 in Australia and Great Britain, but was not released to country radio. The album's third single, "Coming Home" featuring American singer-songwriter Julia Michaels was released on 21 March 2018. This song peaked at number 3 on Country Airplay. Finishing off the single releases was "Never Comin' Down”. This song peaked at number 18, making it his first American album since 2006's “Love, Pain & the Whole Crazy Thing” to not produce a single number one hit, and his first album since 2010's “Get Closer” not to have a single reach the top 40 on the Billboard Hot 100 chart.

== Critical reception ==
Professional ratings
Review scores
Source	Rating
AllMusic	3/5 stars
Rolling Stone	2.5/5 stars

Graffiti U has received mixed to negative reviews from music critics. Stephen Thomas Erlewine of AllMusic gave the album three out of five stars, criticizing Urban's attempt to address complicated sexual politics. He pointed to the song "Gemini", questioning the narrator's solidarity due to the provocative lyrics. Jonathan Bernstein of Rolling Stone gave a two-and-a-half-star review of the album, saying "Urban deserves credit for refusing to rest on his laurels during the height of his arena-headlining mid-career, but on Graffiti U he ends up shining brightest in his well-worn comfort zones while struggling, perhaps for the first time, when he tries to break new sonic and lyrical ground".

== Commercial performance ==
In the United States, Graffiti U debuted at number two on the Billboard 200 with 145,000 album-equivalent units of which 137,000 were in pure album sales. The album benefited from a concert ticket/album sale redemption offer with Urban's latest tour, which began on 15 June 2018. It became Urban's seventh top 10 album in the country. It also debuted atop the Top Country Albums chart, becoming Urban's sixth number-one album on that chart. In its second week, the album fell to number 18 on the Billboard 200 and number three on the Top Country Albums chart, with 17,100 copies sold that week. The album was certified Gold by the RIAA on July 24, 2019. As of July 2019, the album has sold 282,400 copies in the United States.

== Track listing ==
Graffiti U track listing
No.	Title	Writer(s)	Producer(s)	Length
1.	"Coming Home" (featuring Julia Michaels)	Keith Urban; J.R. Rotem; Julia Michaels; Nicolle Galyon; Merle Haggard; (Note: Contains a sample of "Mama Tried" by Merle Haggard.)	Urban; Rotem	3:33
2.	"Never Comin' Down"	Urban; Josh Kerr; James Abrahart; Shy Carter	Urban; Kerr	3:34
3.	"Same Heart"	Urban; Jason Evigan; Emily Weisband; Jordan Minton	Urban; Evigan	3:36
4.	"My Wave (Intro)"			0:28
5.	"My Wave" (featuring Shy Carter)	Urban; Carter; Greg Wells	Urban; Wells	3:32
6.	"Parallel Line"	Ed Sheeran; Benny Blanco; Johnny McDaid; Amy Wadge; Michaels; Guy Berryman; Jonny Buckland; Will Champion; Chris Martin; Mikkel Storleer Eriksen; Tor Erik Hermansen; (Note: Contains a sample of "Everglow" by Coldplay.)	Urban; Blanco; Sheeran; McDaid	4:13
7.	"Drop Top" (featuring Kassi Ashton)	Urban; Jimmy Robbins; Josh Osborne; MoZella	Urban; Robbins; Jesse Shatkin	3:44
8.	"Way Too Long"	Oscar Holter; Nate Ruess; Michaels	Holter	3:15
9.	"Horses" (featuring Lindsay Ell)	Matt Rad; MoZella; Jamie Scott	Urban; Rad	3:37
10.	"Gemini"	Urban; Michaels; Justin Tranter; Ian Kirkpatrick	Urban; Kirkpatrick	4:09
11.	"Texas Time (Intro)"			0:10
12.	"Texas Time"	Max Townsley; Drew Erickson; Steve Lindsey; Dillon O'Brian	Urban; Mike Elizondo	4:51
13.	"Love the Way It Hurts (So Good)"	Urban; Ben Berger; Ryan Rabin; Ryan McMahon	Urban; Captain Cuts	3:21
14.	"Female"	Galyon; Ross Copperman; Shane McAnally	Urban; Dann Huff; Copperman	3:16
15.	"Steal My Thunder"	Urban; Evigan; Weisband; Minton	Urban; Evigan	7:16
Total length:				52:00

== Personnel ==
Adapted from liner notes

"Coming Home"

- Julia Michaels - featured vocals
- J.R. Rotem - bass guitar, percussion, piano, programming, synthesizer
- Keith Urban - all vocals, electric guitar

"Never Comin' Down"

- James "J-Hart" Abrahart - gang vocals
- Shy Carter - vocal percussion, breakdown vocals, gang vocals
- Josh Kerr - programming, gang vocals
- Aaron Sterling - drums
- Keith Urban - bass guitar, electric guitar, lead vocals, background vocals, gang vocals

"Same Heart"

- Jason Evigan - keyboards, programming
- Keith Urban - electric guitar, lead vocals, background vocals
- Emily Weisband - background vocals

"My Wave"

- Shy Carter - lead vocals, background vocals
- Keith Urban - lead vocals, background vocals
- Greg Wells - guitar, acoustic guitar, bass guitar, drums, programming

"Parallel Line"

- Benny Blanco - keyboards, programming
- Johnny McDaid - keyboards, programming
- Pino Palladino - bass guitar
- Ed Sheeran - acoustic guitar, programming
- Keith Urban - electric guitar, all vocals

"Drop Top"

- Kassi Ashton - lead vocals, background vocals
- Jesse Shatkin - drums, percussion, programming, keyboards, synthesizer, piano, guitar, bass guitar
- Keith Urban - lead vocals, background vocals

"Way Too Long"

- David Bukovinszky - cello
- Mattias Bylund - string arranger
- Johan Carlsson - keyboards
- Michael Engström - bass guitar
- Oscar Holter - keyboards, percussion, programming
- Mattias Johansson - violin
- Keith Urban - all vocals, acoustic guitar

"Horses"

- Lindsay Ell - background vocals
- Mozella - background vocals
- Matt Musty - drums
- Pino Palladino - bass guitar
- Matt Rad - guitar, bass guitar, piano, keyboards, drums, percussion, background vocals
- Jamie Scott - background vocals
- Keith Urban - guitar, lead vocals, background vocals
- Eric Valentine - drums

"Gemini"

- Ian Kirkpatrick - keyboards, programming
- Seth Rausch - drums
- Keith Urban - guitar, lead vocals, background vocals

"Texas Time"

- Mike Elizondo - bass guitar, keyboards
- Drew Erickson - clavinet, keyboards
- Aaron Sterling - drums, percussion
- Max Townsley - acoustic guitar, dobro, background vocals
- Keith Urban - guitar, lead vocals, background vocals

"Love the Way It Hurts (So Good)"

- Ben Berger - keyboards, programming, background vocals
- Ryan McMahon - guitar, programming, background vocals
- Ryan Rabin - keyboards, programming, background vocals
- Keith Urban - lead vocals, background vocals

"Female"

- Ross Copperman - acoustic guitar, electric guitar, programming
- Nicolle Galyon - background vocals
- Charlie Judge - keyboards, synthesizer, strings
- Nicole Kidman - background vocals
- Keith Urban - electric guitar, lead vocals

"Steal My Thunder"

- Jason Evigan - electric guitar, keyboards, programming
- Keith Urban - acoustic guitar, electric guitar, lead vocals, background vocals
- Emily Weisband - background vocals

== Charts ==
=== Weekly charts ===
Chart (2018–19)	Peak position
Australian Albums (ARIA)	2
Australian Country Albums (ARIA)	1
Canadian Albums (Billboard)	1
New Zealand Albums (RMNZ)	32
Scottish Albums (Official Charts)	27
UK Country Albums (Official Charts)	9
US Billboard 200	2
US Top Country Albums (Billboard)	1

=== Year-end charts ===
Chart (2018)	Position
Australian Albums (ARIA)	19
Australian Country Albums (ARIA)	1
Canadian Albums (Billboard)	21
US Billboard 200	114
US Top Country Albums (Billboard)	13
Chart (2019)	Position
Australian Country Albums (ARIA)	5
Chart (2020)	Position
Australian Country Albums (ARIA)	26

== Certifications ==
Region	Certification	Certified units/sales
Australia (ARIA)	Gold	35,000^{‡}
United States (RIAA)	Gold	500,000^{‡} / 282,400
^{‡} Sales+streaming figures based on certification alone.
