= For a Boy =

Single by RaeLynn
- Released: March 23, 2015
- Genre: Country; country pop
- Length: 3:02
- Label: Valory Music Group
- Songwriters: RaeLynn; Laura Veltz
- Producer: Joey Moi

RaeLynn singles chronology
"God Made Girls" (2014)	"For a Boy" (2015)	"Love Triangle" (2016)

"For a Boy" is a song co-written and recorded by American country music artist RaeLynn. It was released to radio on March 23, 2015. RaeLynn wrote the song with Laura Veltz.

== History ==
RaeLynn told Entertainment Tonight that "I wrote it about this dinner date I went on, and this guy was super transparent with me and kinda wore his heart on his sleeve…You know, guys always wanna be macho and that kinda thing, so I had this idea of 'for a boy, this guy's pretty transparent and cool.'"

== Critical reception ==
Giving it a "C", Kevin John Coyne of Country Universe wrote that "She’s simply too green for me to take seriously her low level of expectations for both genders. 'For a Boy' is decently constructed, has a production that recalls SHeDAISY, and she sings it just fine."

== Music video ==
The music video was directed by TK McKamy and premiered in May 2015.

== Chart performance ==
The song debuted on the Bubbling Under Hot 100 chart at No. 15, selling 27,000 copies in the US on its debut week. The song peaked at #58 becoming her lowest charting single to date. The song has sold 77,000 copies in the United States as of July 2015.

Chart (2015)	Peak position
US Bubbling Under Hot 100 (Billboard)	15
US Country Airplay (Billboard)	58
US Hot Country Songs (Billboard)	32
