= Stealing Angels =

US musical group

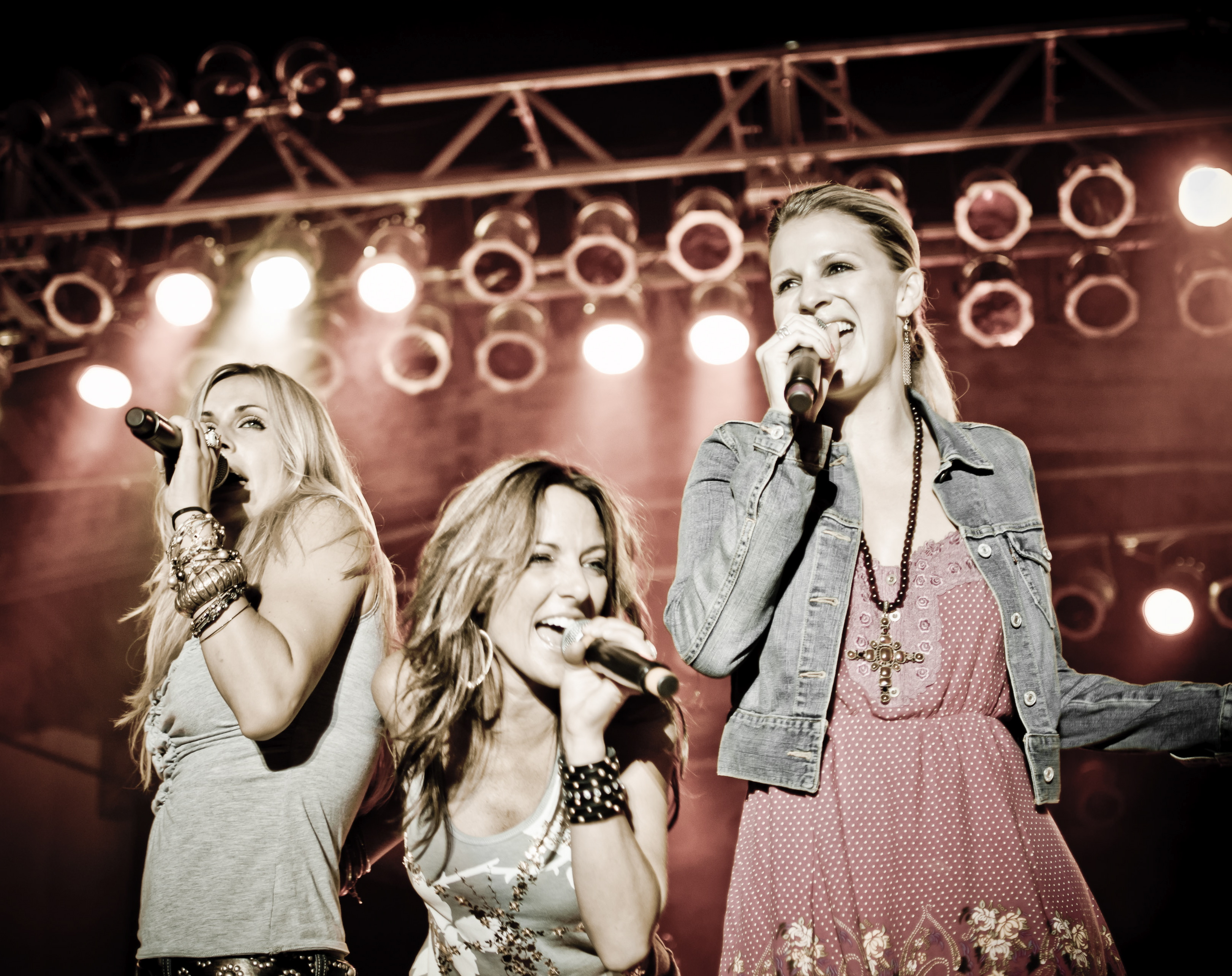
- Stealing Angels live in Fresno, Oct. 10, 2010

Background information
- Origin: Nashville, Tennessee
- Genres: Country
- Years active: 2007–2012
- Label: Skyville
- Spinoffs: Runaway June
- Past members: Caroline Cutbirth; Tayla Lynn; Jennifer Wayne

Stealing Angels was an American country trio, composed of Caroline Cutbirth, Tayla Lynn, and Jennifer Wayne. Their debut single, "He Better Be Dead," was released to radio on July 12, 2010, and debuted at number 59 on the U.S. Billboard Hot Country Songs chart. It was released via Skyville Records, a label owned by record producers Paul Worley and Wally Wilson.

== History ==
Stealing Angels was founded in 2007 when Caroline Cutbirth, Tayla Lynn, and Jennifer Wayne were recruited for a reality show titled All in the Genes, which would focus on the ups and downs of the descendants of famous relatives; Cutbirth is a descendant of Daniel Boone, Jennifer Wayne is John Wayne's granddaughter, and Tayla Lynn is the granddaughter of Loretta Lynn. Wayne was a tennis player in her childhood, and was signed to a label founded by Merv Griffin, but this deal was canceled after Griffin's 2007 death. She met Cutbirth in Nashville, Tennessee, in 2007, and the two later met Lynn when the three were asked to participate in a reality television show focusing on the three girls' ancestry. Although the show was never produced, the three began performing together and named themselves Stealing Angels.

Stealing Angels signed to Skyville Records, a label founded by record producer Paul Worley. The trio's debut single, "He Better Be Dead", debuted at number 59 on the U.S. Billboard Hot Country Songs chart for the week of July 17, 2010, and reached a peak of number 48 on the chart. Lynn told Country Weekly that the song idea came from a conversation she was having about her boyfriend. The trio's second single, "Paper Heart," was released in May 2011 and reached a peak of number 59 after two weeks on the chart. "Little Blue Sky" was released as their third single in November 2011, though it failed to chart.

In their Amazing Race cast interview, both Jennifer Wayne and Caroline Cutbirth confirmed that the band had parted ways. Wayne founded a new group called Runaway June in 2016.

== Discography ==
=== Singles ===
Year	Single	Peak positions
Year	Single	US Country
2010	"He Better Be Dead"	48
2011	"Paper Heart"	59
2011	"Little Blue Sky"	—

=== Music videos ===
Year	Video	Director
2010	"He Better Be Dead"	Mark Nicolosi
2011	"Paper Heart"	Travis Nicholson
