= Love Triangle (RaeLynn song) =

Single by RaeLynn

from the album WildHorse
- Released: August 1, 2016
- Recorded: 2013
- Genre: Country
- Length: 3:44
- Label: Warner Nashville
- Songwriters: RaeLynn; Nicolle Galyon; Jimmy Robbins
- Producers: Nicolle Galyon; Jimmy Robbins

RaeLynn singles chronology
"For a Boy" (2015)	"Love Triangle" (2016)	"Lonely Call" (2017)

Music video
- "Love Triangle" on YouTube

"Love Triangle" is a song by American country music singer and songwriter RaeLynn. It was released on August 1, 2016, to country radio through Warner Music Nashville as the lead single from her debut studio album, WildHorse. Co-written by RaeLynn, the song was also written with its producers, Nicolle Galyon and Jimmy Robbins.

== Background ==
In an interview with People's Danielle Anderson, RaeLynn said "I was headed to a writing session and my mom and dad were arguing that day about really the stupidest thing. I got to the writing session and there were two of my dearest friends, Jimmy Robbins and Nicolle Galyon, and I started venting about being a kid of divorce. I was like, 'You know what, though? I don't want to be in a sad mood today. Let's just write something fun and sappy.' Then I threw out the title, 'Love Triangle.' I don't remember who said it, but they were like, 'Well if you think about it, you're kind of in a love triangle today. I just think that this song is going to touch a lot of people."

== Critical reception ==
Sounds Like Nashville referred to the song as the focal point of RaeLynn's WildHorse record and stands out among the rest for its clever play on words and brutal honesty about a tough reality. Danielle Anderson of People called it "raw and emotional". Taste of Country's Billy Dukes said the song has a "fairytale quality" and called it "an autobiographical ballad".

The song has sold 158,000 copies in the United States as of May 2017.

== Music video ==
The official music video was released on August 2, 2016.

== Charts ==
=== Weekly charts ===
Chart (2016–2017)	Peak position
US Country Airplay (Billboard)	26
US Hot Country Songs (Billboard)	27

=== Year-end charts ===
Chart (2017)	Position
US Hot Country Songs (Billboard)	90

== Certifications ==
Region	Certification	Certified units/sales
United States (RIAA)	Gold	500,000^{‡}
^{‡} Sales+streaming figures based on certification alone.

== Release history ==
Region	Date	Format	Label	Ref.
Worldwide	July 11, 2016	Digital download	Warner Nashville	
United States	August 1, 2016	Country radio	Warner Bros.	
