= Parallel Line (Keith Urban song) =

Single by Keith Urban

from the album Graffiti U
- Released: 18 January 2018
- Recorded: 2017
- Genre: Country pop
- Length: 4:13
- Label: Hit Red; Capitol Nashville
- Songwriters: Ed Sheeran; Benny Blanco; Johnny McDaid; Amy Wadge; Julia Michaels; Guy Berryman; Jonny Buckland; Will Champion; Chris Martin; Mikkel Storleer Eriksen; Tor Erik Hermansen
- Producers: Urban; Blanco; Sheeran; McDaid

Keith Urban singles chronology
"Female" (2017)	"Parallel Line" (2018)	"Coming Home" (2018)

"Parallel Line" is a song recorded by Australian and American country music singer Keith Urban. It was released on 18 January 2018 as the second single from his tenth studio album,Graffiti U (2018). The song contains a sample of "Everglow" by Coldplay.

== Critical reception ==
Stephen L. Betts from Rolling Stone said: "Reminiscent of a Nineties slow jam, in a contemporary Ed Sheeran-style glorious chorus and hook, but uninspiring disjointed verses in between. The tune spotlights Urban singing the verses in a higher register and giving the pleading lyrics a keener sense of urgency."

== Charts ==
Chart (2018–2019)	Peak position
Australia (ARIA)	47
Canada Digital Songs (Billboard)	10
Scotland Singles (OCC)	78
US Hot Country Songs (Billboard)	25

== Certifications ==
Region	Certification	Certified units/sales
Australia (ARIA)	2× Platinum	140,000^{‡}
New Zealand (RMNZ)	Gold	15,000^{‡}
United States (RIAA)	Gold	500,000^{‡}
^{‡} Sales+streaming figures based on certification alone.
