= Black Sheep (Dean Brody song) =

2019 song by Dean Brody

Single by Dean Brody

from the EP Black Sheep
- Released: August 21, 2019
- Genre: Country
- Length: 3:16
- Label: Open Road; Scurvy Dog
- Songwriter(s): Dean Brody
- Producer(s): Matt Rovey

Dean Brody singles chronology
"Whiskey in a Teacup" (2019)	"Black Sheep" (2019)	"Can't Help Myself" (2020)

"Black Sheep" is a song written and recorded by Canadian country music artist Dean Brody. It was the fourth single and title track off his extended play Black Sheep.

== Background ==
Brody wrote "Black Sheep" based on personal experience. He said he "often felt like an outsider" at times in his life, both as a child in church, and as an adult being a musician. It was partially inspired by his decision to pursue a career in music. Brody wrote the song in Nashville, where he was living at the time.

== Critical reception ==
"Black Sheep" received generally positive reviews. Nanci Dagg of Canadian Beats Media referred to the track as a "boot-stomping" with an "upbeat tempo [and] meaning that people can relate to". Annie Reuter of Billboard said the song had "inspiring lyrics". Melissa Novacaska of Exclaim! noted the song had a "gospel ring to it".

== Music video ==
The official music video for "Black Sheep" premiered exclusively on Billboard on July 29, 2019. The video was shot in Nashville, Tennessee and directed by Brian Vaughn.

== Chart performance ==
"Black Sheep" reached a peak of number 5 on the Billboard Canada Country chart dated November 30, 2019.

Chart (2019)	Peak position
Canada Country (Billboard)	5
