= Natalie Stovall and the Drive =

American country music group

- Origin: Nashville, Tennessee, U.S.
- Genres: Country
- Years active: 2012–2016
- Label: HitShop/Warner Bros.
- Past members: Natalie Stovall; James Bavendam; Miguel Cancino; Joel Dormer

Natalie Stovall and her band entertain the U.S. Navy

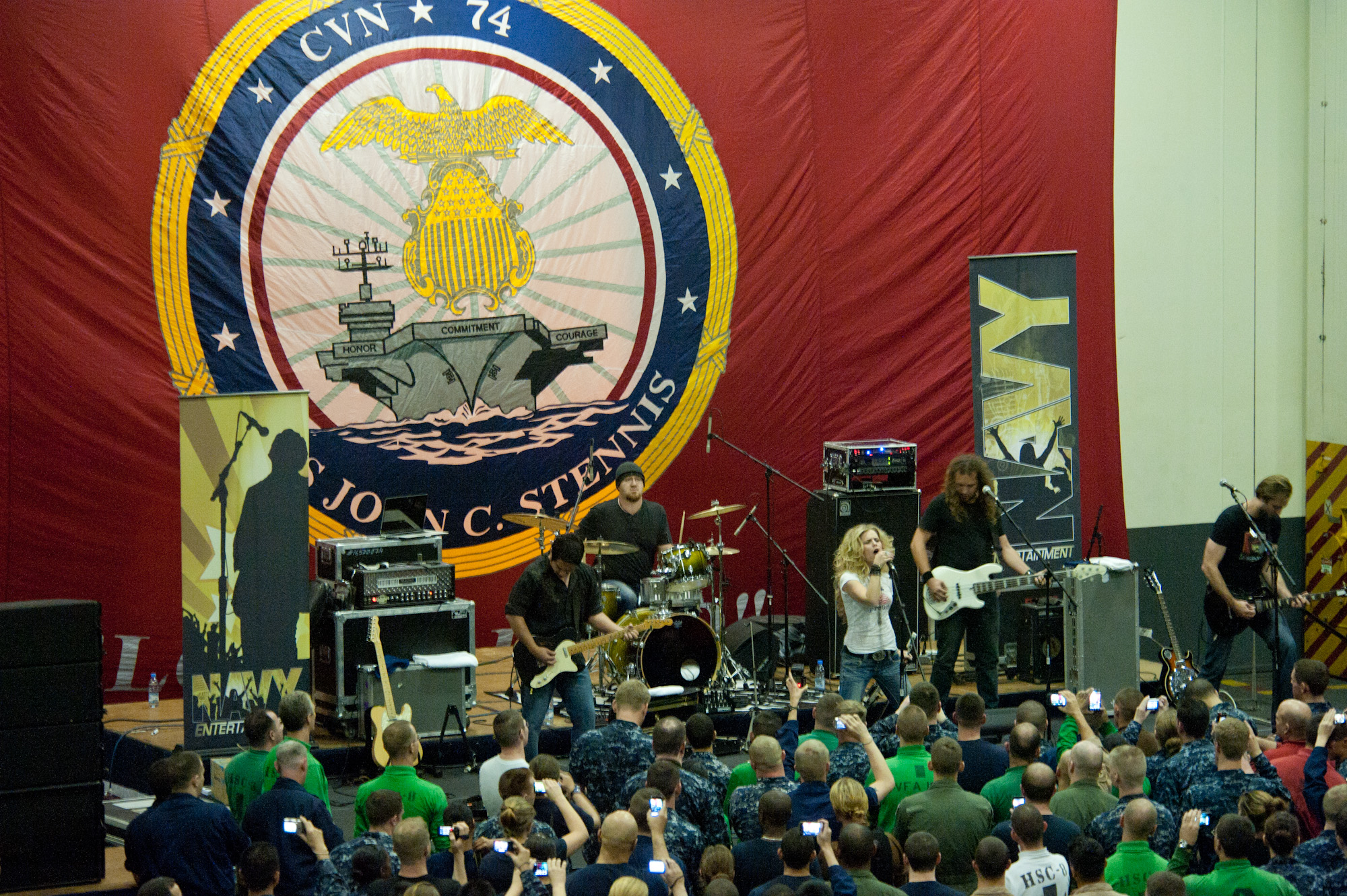
The Natalie Stovall Band aboard USS John C. Stennis in November 2011

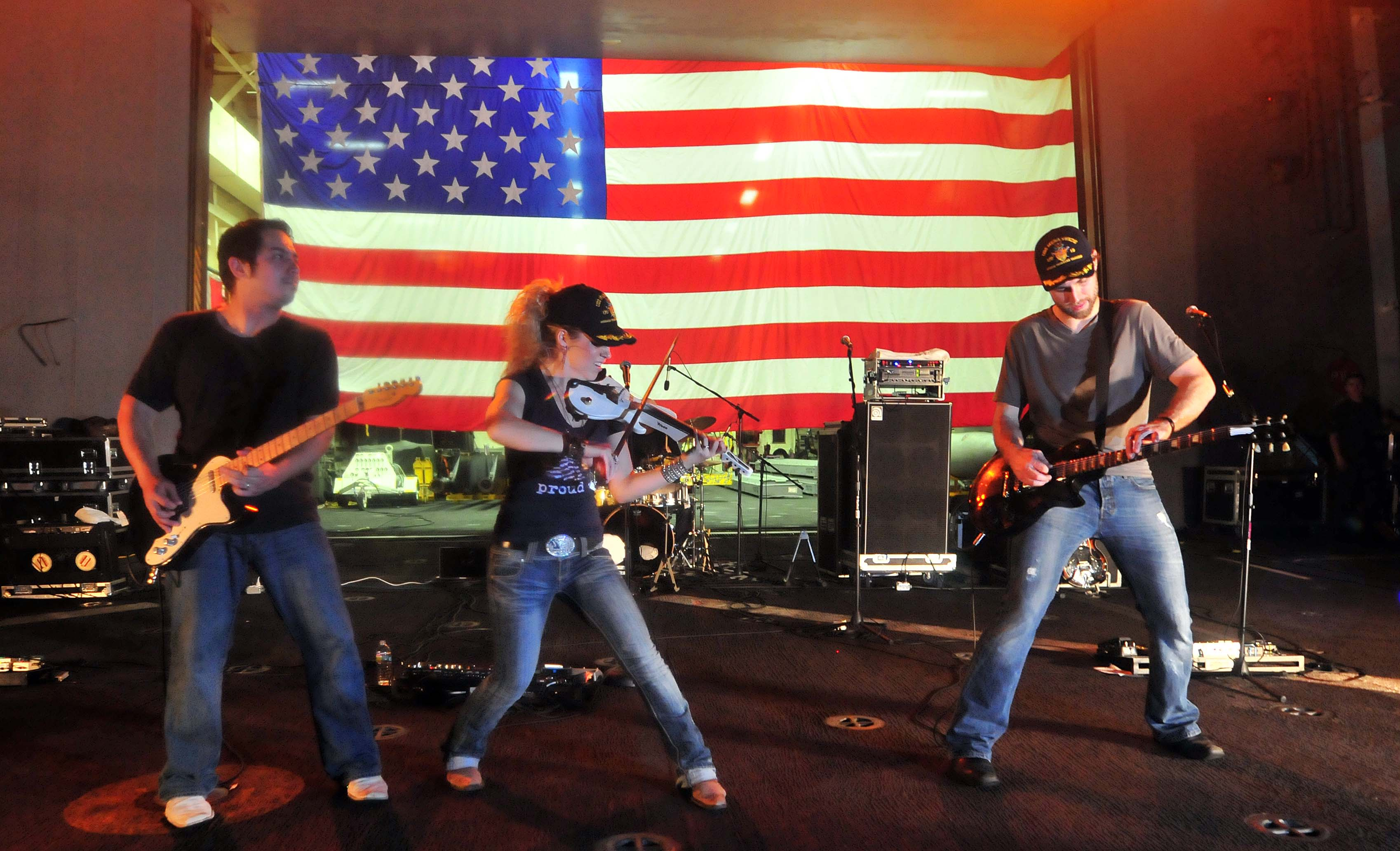
Stovall and her band perform aboard USS Mesa Verde in November 2011

Natalie Stovall and the Drive was an American country music group composed of Natalie Stovall (lead vocals, fiddle), Miguel Cancino (guitar), Zach Morse (bass), Joel Dormer (guitar, vocals), and James Bavendam (drums).

Their debut single, "Baby Come On with It", was released in February 2014 after receiving airplay on Sirius XM Radio.

Stovall was raised in Columbia, Tennessee. She had performed on the Grand Ole Opry and The Oprah Winfrey Show. She met Bavendam in college, recruited Cancino through a Craigslist ad, then met Morse and Dormer through mutual friends.

Their debut album, released on Hitshop/Warner Bros. Records, will be produced by Paul Worley and Clarke Schleicher. In advance of its release, the band released a self-titled extended play that includes the single and five additional songs. In 2014 the group released their single, "Mason Jar".

Leading up to the 2014 CMA Awards, the group was featured in the "On The Road To The CMA Awards" digital series with JCPenney. Their first national television commercial was aired during the show, with behind the scenes footage available on the JCPenney YouTube

== The Voice ==
Natalie Stovall took part in season 13 of the American The Voice. In the Blind Audition broadcast on NBC on October 9, 2017, she performed Adele's "If It Hadn't Been For Love" and joined Team Blake Shelton. In the battles, she faced off against Adam Cunningham, singing Little Big Town's song, "Boondocks". Stovall lost her battle, and was sent home. However, Shelton brought her back into the competition for the playoffs, giving her one more chance as his comeback artist. She was eliminated again after her performance of "Callin' Baton Rouge" during the playoffs.

In May 2020, Stovall joined the group Runaway June. During the COVID-19 pandemic, she presented livestream performances of the Grand Ole Opry alongside Bobby Bones.

== Discography ==
=== As Natalie Stovall ===
Title	Details
Late Night Conversations	Release date: January 1, 2006; Label: F. M. G.
Standing My Ground (EP)	Release date: March 21, 2010; Label: Hat Factory

=== As Natalie Stovall And The Drive ===
Title	Details
Natalie Stovall and the Drive (EP)	Release date: August 10, 2015; Label: self-released
Heartbreak (EP)	Release date: February 23, 2016; Label: self-released

=== Singles ===
Year	Single	Peak chart positions	Album
Year	Single	US Country Airplay	Album
2014	"Baby Come On with It"	43	Natalie Stovall and the Drive

=== Music videos ===
Year	Video	Director
2014	"Baby Come On with It"	Randy Peterson
2014	"Mason Jar"	Brandon Faris
2016	"Heartbreak"	Randy Peterson/Ron Gonzalez
