= Frank Johnson (musician) =

- Also known as: Uncle Frank, Old Frank
- Born: c. 1789; North Carolina, United States
- Died: 1871 North Carolina, United States
- Occupation: Musician
- Instruments: Violin, clarinet, cornet
- Years active: 1830s to c. 1870

Frank Johnson (c. 1789 – 1871) was an American popular fiddle player and brass band leader based in North Carolina, near Wilmington, United States, for most of the nineteenth century. Although largely forgotten by history books and often confused with composer Francis "Frank" Johnson, he helped define the sound of African-American fiddle and brass-band music in the mid-19th century.

== Personal life ==
Johnson was born into slavery circa 1789, in North Carolina, and became a free man sometime before 1830. He showed a talent for music early on and established himself as a popular fiddle player for dances. Using money he earned from performances, he bought the freedom of himself, his wife and his children.

A contemporary account of Johnson while performing at a "pic nic" describes him: "To say that he is handsome would not be strictly true, and still, when he is living so full of music that his features follow the changes of his tune, it is fair to say he looks very 'becoming'."

He was buried in Pine Forest Cemetery, Wilmington, after a well-attended funeral: "the largest, we think, that has ever occurred in this city, it being estimated that there were at least two thousand persons in the procession, including the colored fire companies in uniform, with standards draped in mourning, the colored Masonic fraternity in regalia, etc., the whole preceded by a brass band."

== Career ==
Johnson assembled his freed sons and various nephews into an eponymous brass band by 1830. The band consisted of about 15 members. Johnson himself played many instruments, but was known for his mastery of the fiddle, clarinet, and cornet. The Frank Johnson Band was popular with white planters and often played for state fairs, picnics, cotillions, college commencement balls (e.g., at Chapel Hill, North Carolina), and political rallies (but only for Democrats). Johnson was one of the innovators of square dancing. As Frank S. Woodson, the editor of the Newport News Morning Herald recollected, Johnson played "square dances all the time — and, O, my, how Old Frank Johnson could call the figures: 'Balance All.' 'Swing Your Partner,' 'Ladies' Change,' 'Back Again, Doocee-do,' 'Swing Corners All,' etc., etc." Johnson called the dance moves while dressed in a "spike-tailed coat with brass buttons and a stove-pipe hat." His popularity was such that the New Bern Times proclaimed in 1866, "Frank Johnson has grown into an institution. He has brought the science of brass band music to such a high state of perfection that few dare to compete with him, and as to the violin, it’s no use talking."

As recalled by Woodson, in 1901, the Band's repertoire included:

- "Katie Wells"
- "Gentle Fairy Belle"
- "Who'll Take Sugar in his Coffee"
- "Mocking Bird"
- "My Dark Virginia Bride"
- "Old Folks at Home"

During the Civil War, Johnson remained in the South and performed for Confederate ceremonies. When Col. A. M. Waddell was ordered to raise a Confederate company in Chatham County in 1861, he hired the band to play for Confederate recruiting functions. The War ended in 1865, when Johnson was probably in his 70s. The band never returned to its former popularity. According to Tom Parramore, "Old Frank was too much a party of the planters' culture to survive its destruction. When the cotton and slave society were gone, there was no place anymore for Old Frank Johnson and his music."

== Legacy ==
Johnson's music, among that of other old-time African-American fiddlers, inspired Rhiannon Giddens and Dom Flemons and led to the creation of the Carolina Chocolate Drops in 2005.
