= Coming Home (Keith Urban song) =

Single by Keith Urban featuring Julia Michaels

from the album Graffiti U
- Released: 21 March 2018
- Genre: Country pop
- Length: 3:34
- Label: Hit Red; Capitol Nashville
- Songwriters: Keith Urban; J.R. Rotem; Julia Michaels; Nicolle Galyon; Merle Haggard
- Producers: Keith Urban; J.R. Rotem

Keith Urban singles chronology
"Parallel Line" (2018)	"Coming Home" (2018)	"Never Comin Down" (2018)

Julia Michaels singles chronology
"Heaven" (2018)	"Coming Home" (2018)	"Jump" (2018)

Music video
- "Keith Urban - Coming Home ft. Julia Michaels" on YouTube

"Coming Home" is a song recorded by Australian and American country music singer Keith Urban featuring American singer Julia Michaels, released in March 2018 as the second single from Urban's 2018 album Graffiti U. The artists co-wrote the song with Nicolle Galyon and J.R. Rotem, with Merle Haggard receiving songwriting credits for the sampling of his 1968 single "Mama Tried". Urban and Rotem are also the producers.

== Background and composition ==
Urban told Billboard he enlisted Michaels "to help [him] flesh out a few little bits and pieces, and then she had this cool bridge idea and she sang that, so she ended up on the song. It's a very specific piece, drawing from very different places from Merle to Julia to J.R. to what [he does], all coming together."

The song contains a sample of "Mama Tried" by Merle Haggard. Urban sought approval from Haggard's widow, Theresa, and his son, Ben, for the use of the guitar riff.

== Critical reception ==
Billy Dukes from Taste of Country said it's a "song aimed at the next generation of country music fans."

== Commercial performance ==
As of August 2018, "Coming Home" has sold 113,000 copies in the United States.

== Music video ==
The music video was directed by Andy Hines and premiered on CMT, GAC and Vevo in April 2018. It was filmed in Los Angeles for over two days, with the main performance with Michaels being at the city's Cowboy Palace Saloon.

== Charts ==
=== Weekly charts ===
Chart (2018)	Peak position
Australia (ARIA)	84
Canada Hot 100 (Billboard)	84
Canada Country (Billboard)	1
US Billboard Hot 100	50
US Country Airplay (Billboard)	3
US Hot Country Songs (Billboard)	11

=== Year-end charts ===
Chart (2018)	Position
US Country Airplay (Billboard)	36
US Hot Country Songs (Billboard)	45

== Certifications ==
Region	Certification	Certified units/sales
Australia (ARIA)	Gold	35,000^{‡}
United States (RIAA)	Gold	500,000^{‡}
^{‡} Sales+streaming figures based on certification alone.
