= Kylie Rae Harris =

American singer-songwriter (1989–2019)

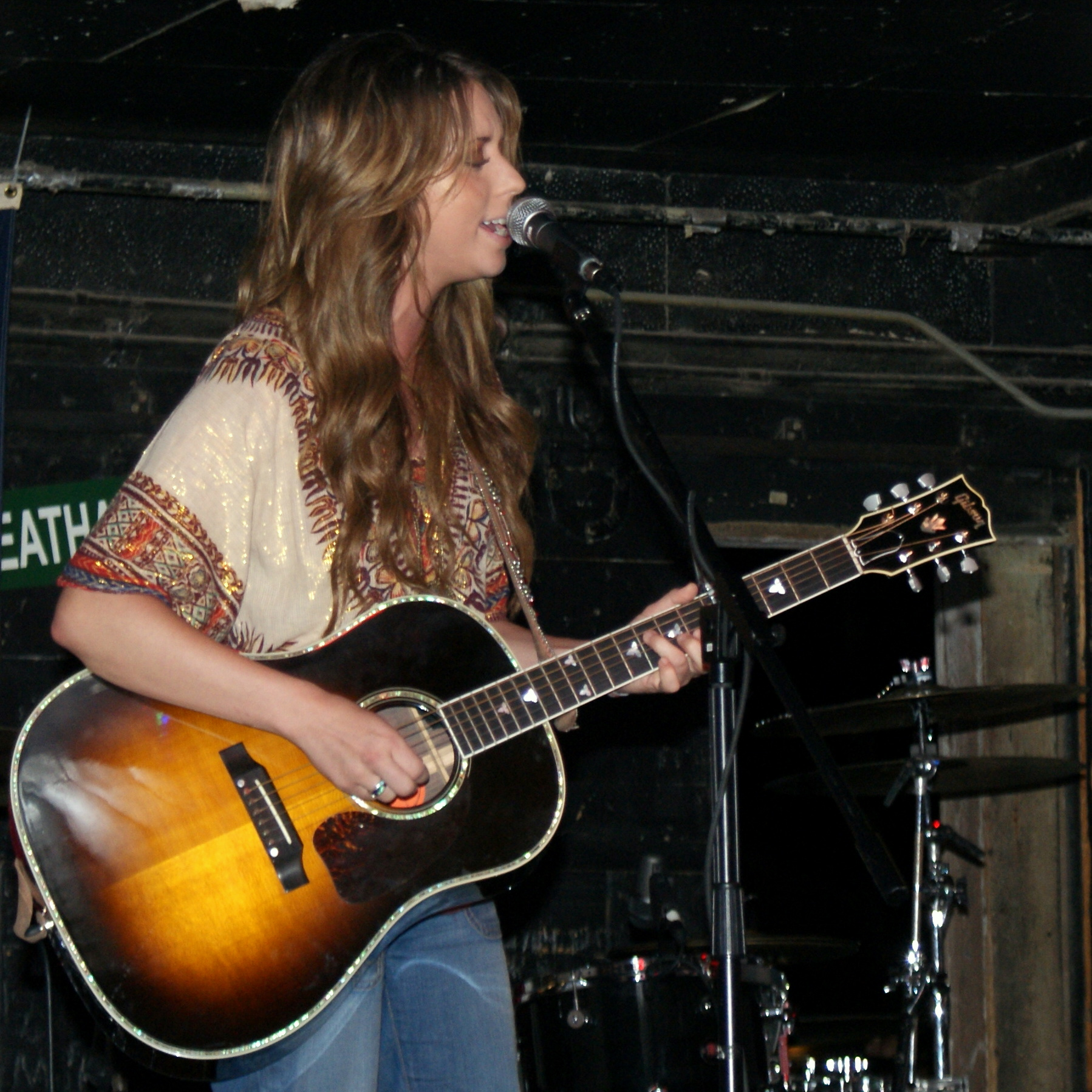
- Harris performing in 2012

Background information
- Born: May 15, 1989
- Origin: Wylie, Texas, U.S.
- Died: September 4, 2019 (aged 30) Taos, New Mexico, U.S.
- Genres: Country
- Occupations: Singer; songwriter; musician
- Instruments: Vocals; guitar
- Years active: 2010–2019
- Website: kylieraeharris.com

Kylie Rae Harris (May 15, 1989 – September 4, 2019) was an American singer-songwriter. She was born in Wylie, Texas.

== Career ==
At age twelve, Harris was enrolled in a vocal camp and began crafting her own songs and playing guitar. By the time she graduated from high school, Harris earned a music scholarship and a welding scholarship, but took neither and decided to press on with her musical career. She was one of the featured artists in Troubadour, TX, a television show documenting her rising career as a Texas country singer-songwriter.

On July 1, 2010, Harris released her debut album titled All the Right Reasons, followed by an EP in 2013 titled Taking It Back.

In 2013, Harris began working on material for a second full-length album and toured with fellow Troubadour, TX star Zane Williams throughout the state. Then in March 2019, she released a new self titled EP.

== Death ==
Harris died on September 4, 2019, when her car collided with another near Taos, New Mexico. She was 30 years old and is survived by her daughter. A subsequent investigation, completed in December 2019, revealed she had been driving up to 102 mph (164 km/h) (95 mph (153 km/h) when the crash occurred), confirmed by her vehicle's computer, and had a blood alcohol level three times the legal limit. Harris clipped the rear end of a vehicle in the right lane, swerved into oncoming traffic, and hit another car head-on. The driver of the other car, 16-year-old Taos High School student Maria Elena Cruz, was also killed. Cruz's father, Deputy Chief Pedro Cruz of the San Cristobal Fire District, responded to the call not knowing his daughter had been involved in the accident.

Harris had a drunk driving conviction from 2017. As part of her conviction, she was ordered to have an ignition interlock device installed in her car.
