= Good Goodbye (Dean Brody song) =

2018 song by Dean Brody

Single by Dean Brody

from the EP Black Sheep
- Released: May 25, 2018
- Genre: Country
- Length: 3:44
- Label: Open Road; Scurvy Dog
- Songwriter(s): Dean Brody
- Producer(s): Matt Rovey

Dean Brody singles chronology
"8th Day" (2017)	"Good Goodbye" (2018)	"Dose of Country" (2018)

"Good Goodbye" is a song written and recorded by Canadian country music artist Dean Brody. It was the lead single off his extended play Black Sheep.

== Background ==
Brody wrote the song about spending the last few hours of a vacation in Mexico before catching a flight.

== Critical reception ==
Front Porch Music said the track "exudes Dean Brody’s typical style", noting influences of mariachi and Caribbean music. They called it a great song and something to enjoy "on the patio all Summer long".

== Commercial performance ==
"Good Goodbye" reached a peak of number 6 on the Billboard Canada Country chart dated September 1, 2018. It also charted at #40 on Hot Canadian Digital Song Sales for the week of June 9, 2018. The song has been certified Gold by Music Canada.

== Charts ==
Chart (2018)	Peak position
Canada Country (Billboard)	6
Canada Digital Songs (Billboard)	40

== Certifications ==
Region	Certification	Certified units/sales
Canada (Music Canada)	Gold	40,000^{‡}
^{‡} Sales+streaming figures based on certification alone.
