= Blue Roses (Runaway June album) =

Studio album by Runaway June
- Released: June 28, 2019
- Genre: Country
- Length: 32:16
- Label: Wheelhouse
- Producers: Dann Huff (all tracks except 3 & 5); Ross Copperman (tracks 3 & 5)

Runaway June chronology
Runaway June (EP) (2018)	Blue Roses (2019)	New Kind of Emotion (2025)

Singles from Blue Roses
- 1. "Buy My Own Drinks" Released: August 20, 2018; 2. "Head over Heels" Released: October 28, 2019; 3. "We Were Rich" Released: June 29, 2020

Professional ratings
Review scores
Source	Rating
AllMusic	4/5 stars
Exclaim!	7/10
Rolling Stone	3.5/5 stars

Blue Roses is the debut studio album by American country music group Runaway June. It was released June 28, 2019 via Wheelhouse. "Buy My Own Drinks" was released as its debut single in August 2018 and reached the top 20 of the Billboard Country Airplay charts, making it the first time a female group or trio had done so in 14 years.

== Content ==
Blue Roses was preceded by the release of three singles, though only "Buy My Own Drinks" ultimately made the tracklisting for the album. Three other songs originally featured on their self-titled EP were also reprised on the album, including a cover of Dwight Yoakam's "Fast as You." Of the 10 tracks on the album, members of Runaway June have writing credits on six, and it was produced by Dann Huff.

The group promoted the album during the C2C: Country to Country festival in March 2019 and 2020 and as a supporting act for Carrie Underwood on her Cry Pretty Tour 360, which began on May 1, 2019, alongside Maddie & Tae.

== Commercial performance ==
The album debuted at No. 36 on Billboard' Top Country Albums, and No. 5 on Country Album Sales, with 3,000 copies sold, 5,000 in equivalent album units. It has sold 7,600 copies in the United States as of October 2019.

== Track listing ==
No.	Title	Writer(s)	Length
1.	"Head over Heels"	Tommy Cecil; Naomi Cooke; Hannah Mulholland; Jared Mullins; Jennifer Wayne	3:09
2.	"Buy My Own Drinks"	Cooke; Josh Kear; Hillary Lindsey; Mulholland; Wayne	3:23
3.	"We Were Rich"	Ross Copperman; Nicolle Galyon; Ashley Gorley	3:38
4.	"I Know the Way"	Cooke; Mulholland; Emily Shackelton; Wayne; Ben West	3:08
5.	"Trouble with This Town"	Cooke; Chris DeStefano; Liz Rose; Wayne	2:59
6.	"Got Me Where I Want You"	Kat Higgins; Justin Morgan; James T. Slater	3:15
7.	"Fast as You"	Dwight Yoakam	3:15
8.	"I Am Too"	busbee; Corey Crowder; Rose	3:02
9.	"Good, Bad & Ugly"	Jacob Attwooll; Cooke; Mulholland; Samuel Roman; Wayne	3:04
10.	"Blue Roses"	Cooke; Caroline Cutbirth; Marcus Hummon; Wayne	3:23

== Personnel ==
Adapted from AllMusic

=== Runaway June ===
- Naomi Cooke - lead vocals
- Hannah Mulholland - background vocals
- Jennifer Wayne - background vocals

=== Additional Personnel ===
- Dave Cohen - accordion, keyboards
- Ross Copperman - acoustic guitar, electric guitar, keyboards, programming
- Dan Dugmore - electric guitar, steel guitar
- Paul Franklin - steel guitar
- Dann Huff - electric guitar
- David Huff - programming
- Charlie Judge - keyboards
- Tony Lucido - bass guitar
- Danny Rader - acoustic guitar
- Jerry Roe - drums, percussion
- Aaron Sterling - drums
- Ilya Toshinsky - banjo, acoustic guitar, electric guitar, hi-string guitar
- Derek Wells - electric guitar
- Glenn Worf - bass guitar
- Nir Z. - drums, percussion

== Charts ==
Chart (2019)	Peak position
US Heatseekers Albums (Billboard)	2
US Independent Albums (Billboard)	10
US Top Country Albums (Billboard)	36
US Top Album Sales (Billboard)	44
