= Buy My Own Drinks =

Single by Runaway June

from the album Blue Roses
- Released: August 20, 2018
- Genre: Country
- Length: 3:23
- Label: Wheelhouse
- Songwriters: Naomi Cooke, Josh Kear, Hillary Lindsey, Hannah Mullholand, Jennifer Wayne
- Producer: Dann Huff

Runaway June singles chronology
"Wild West" (2017)	"Buy My Own Drinks" (2018)	"Head over Heels" (2019)

"Buy My Own Drinks" is a song recorded by American country music group Runaway June. It was released as a single in August 2018, and served as the second single from their self-titled EP and lead-off single to Blue Roses, their full-length debut album, both released via Wheelhouse.

== Content ==
"Buy My Own Drinks" is an uptempo "ebullient female anthem" about a woman who goes out for drinks following the end of a relationship and celebrates how she doesn't need a man. It was written by all three members of Runaway June along with Josh Kear and Hillary Lindsey.

== Music video ==
The music video for the song premiered on March 1, 2019. Directed by Peter Zavadil, it features the 3 members of the group as bartenders at a local bar, as well as younger versions of themselves reenacting each member's dreams if they weren't a singer: an artist, a dog groomer, and a bouncer.

== Chart performance ==
"Buy My Own Drinks" debuted on the Billboard Country Airplay chart at number 59 on the chart dated October 6, 2018. It reached the top 10 of the chart in September 2019, making it the first time a female group or trio had done so since SHeDAISY's "Don't Worry 'Bout a Thing" in 2005, fourteen years prior. It reached a peak of #8 later that month. It also became the group's first chart single on the Billboard Hot 100, debuting at number 90 for the chart dated August 24, 2019.

It has sold 42,000 digital copies in the United States as of October 2019.

== Charts ==
=== Weekly charts ===
Chart (2018–19)	Peak position
Canada Country (Billboard)	15
US Billboard Hot 100	88
US Country Airplay (Billboard)	8
US Hot Country Songs (Billboard)	17

=== Year-end charts ===
Chart (2019)	Position
US Country Airplay (Billboard)	39
US Hot Country Songs (Billboard)	59

== Certifications ==
Region	Certification	Certified units/sales
United States (RIAA)	Gold	500,000^{‡}
^{‡} Sales+streaming figures based on certification alone.
