= WildHorse =

Studio album by RaeLynn
- Released: March 24, 2017
- Genre: Country
- Length: 41:19
- Label: Warner Bros. Nashville
- Producer: Jimmy Robbins; Nicolle Galyon

RaeLynn chronology
Me (2015)	WildHorse (2017)	Baytown (2020)

Singles from WildHorse
- 1. "Love Triangle" Released: August 1, 2016; 2. "Lonely Call" Released: June 26, 2017

WildHorse is the debut studio album by American country music artist RaeLynn. It was released on March 24, 2017, via Warner Bros. Nashville. The lead single from the album, "Love Triangle", reached the top 30 on the Billboard Country Airplay chart.

== Content ==
RaeLynn co-wrote eleven of the album's twelve tracks. It also features guest appearances from Leeland Mooring (on "Young") and Dan + Shay (on "Say").

== Commercial performance ==
The album debuted atop the Hot Country Albums chart with 20,000 album-equivalent units, 16,000 of those being pure sales. It also debuted at No. 20 on the Billboard 200. The album has sold 47,200 copies in the US as of March 2018.

== Track listing ==
WildHorse track listing
No.	Title	Writer(s)	Length
1.	"Your Heart"	Nicolle Galyon; RaeLynn; Jimmy Robbins	3:27
2.	"WildHorse"	Blair Daly; Hillary Lindsey; RaeLynn	3:20
3.	"Love Triangle"	Galyon; RaeLynn; Robbins	3:45
4.	"Lonely Call"	Galyon; Rob Hawkins; RaeLynn	3:44
5.	"Insecure"	Galyon; RaeLynn; Robbins	3:18
6.	"The Apple"	Marshall Altman; Galyon; Emily Weisband	3:33
7.	"Young" (featuring Leeland Mooring)	Galyon; Leeland Mooring; RaeLynn	3:49
8.	"Diamonds"	RaeLynn; Robbins; Weisband	3:23
9.	"Trigger"	RaeLynn; Jordan Reynolds; Weisband	2:55
10.	"Graveyard"	Galyon; RaeLynn; Robbins	2:58
11.	"Say" (featuring Dan + Shay)	Barry Dean; RaeLynn; Robbins	2:58
12.	"Praying for Rain"	Galyon; Mooring; RaeLynn	4:09
Total length:			41:19

== Charts ==
Chart performance for WildHorse
Chart (2017)	Peak position
Canadian Albums (Billboard)	36
US Billboard 200	20
US Top Country Albums (Billboard)	1
