= Dose of Country =

2018 song by Dean Brody

Single by Dean Brody

from the EP Black Sheep
- Released: October 10, 2018
- Genre: Country
- Length: 3:41
- Label: Open Road; Scurvy Dog
- Songwriter(s): Dean Brody
- Producer(s): Matt Rovey

Dean Brody singles chronology
"Good Goodbye" (2018)	"Dose of Country" (2018)	"Whiskey in a Teacup" (2019)

Music video
- "Dose of Country" on YouTube

"Dose of Country" is a song written and recorded by Canadian country music artist Dean Brody. It was the second single off his extended play Black Sheep.

== Background ==
The song was originally released as a promotional single in May 2018, and received over 700,000 streams between Spotify and Apple Music prior to its official release as a single to country radio.

== Critical reception ==
Roman Mitz of The Music Express described the track as "a throwback to simpler times and a more traditional sound".

== Music video ==
The official music video for "Dose of Country" premiered on October 10, 2018. ET Canada premiered a teaser of the video prior to its release. It was filmed in Mulmur, Ontario and featured Brody along with a contest winner and 100 of her closest family and friends. The contest was held in partnership with Twisted Tea and billed as the "Totally Twisted Summer Party". Brody said he "wanted to find a way to show my fans how much their support means" by staging the contest for the video.

== Chart performance ==
"Dose of Country" reached a peak of number 6 on the Billboard Canada Country chart dated February 23, 2019, marking his eleventh Top 5 hit.

Chart (2019)	Peak position
Canada Country (Billboard)	4
