= Whiskey in a Teacup =

2019 song by Dean Brody

Single by Dean Brody

from the EP Black Sheep
- Released: March 8, 2019
- Genre: Country
- Length: 3:02
- Label: Open Road; Scurvy Dog
- Songwriter(s): Dean Brody
- Producer(s): Matt Rovey

Dean Brody singles chronology
"Dose of Country" (2018)	"Whiskey in a Teacup" (2019)	"Black Sheep" (2019)

"Whiskey in a Teacup" is a song written and recorded by Canadian country music artist Dean Brody. It was the third single off his extended play Black Sheep, It is one of Brody's seven platinum-certified singles, and was nominated for Single of the Year at the 2020 CCMA Awards.

== Critical reception ==
Top Country named the song "Pick of the Week" for July 4, 2019, stating the "production is a fresh take on gritty that country music needed".

== Commercial performance ==
"Whiskey in a Teacup" was certified Platinum by Music Canada on March 16, 2020, with over 80,000 sales. As of November 2020, the song had received over 9 million streams through Spotify.

== Chart performance ==
"Whiskey in a Teacup" reached a peak of number 3 on the Billboard Canada Country chart dated July 13, 2019. It also peaked at number 69 on the Billboard Canadian Hot 100, his first charting entry there since "Love Would Be Enough" in 2015.

Chart (2019)	Peak position
Canada (Canadian Hot 100)	69
Canada Country (Billboard)	3

== Certifications ==
Region	Certification	Certified units/sales
Canada (Music Canada)	Platinum	80,000^{‡}
^{‡} Sales+streaming figures based on certification alone.
