= Runaway June =

American country music group

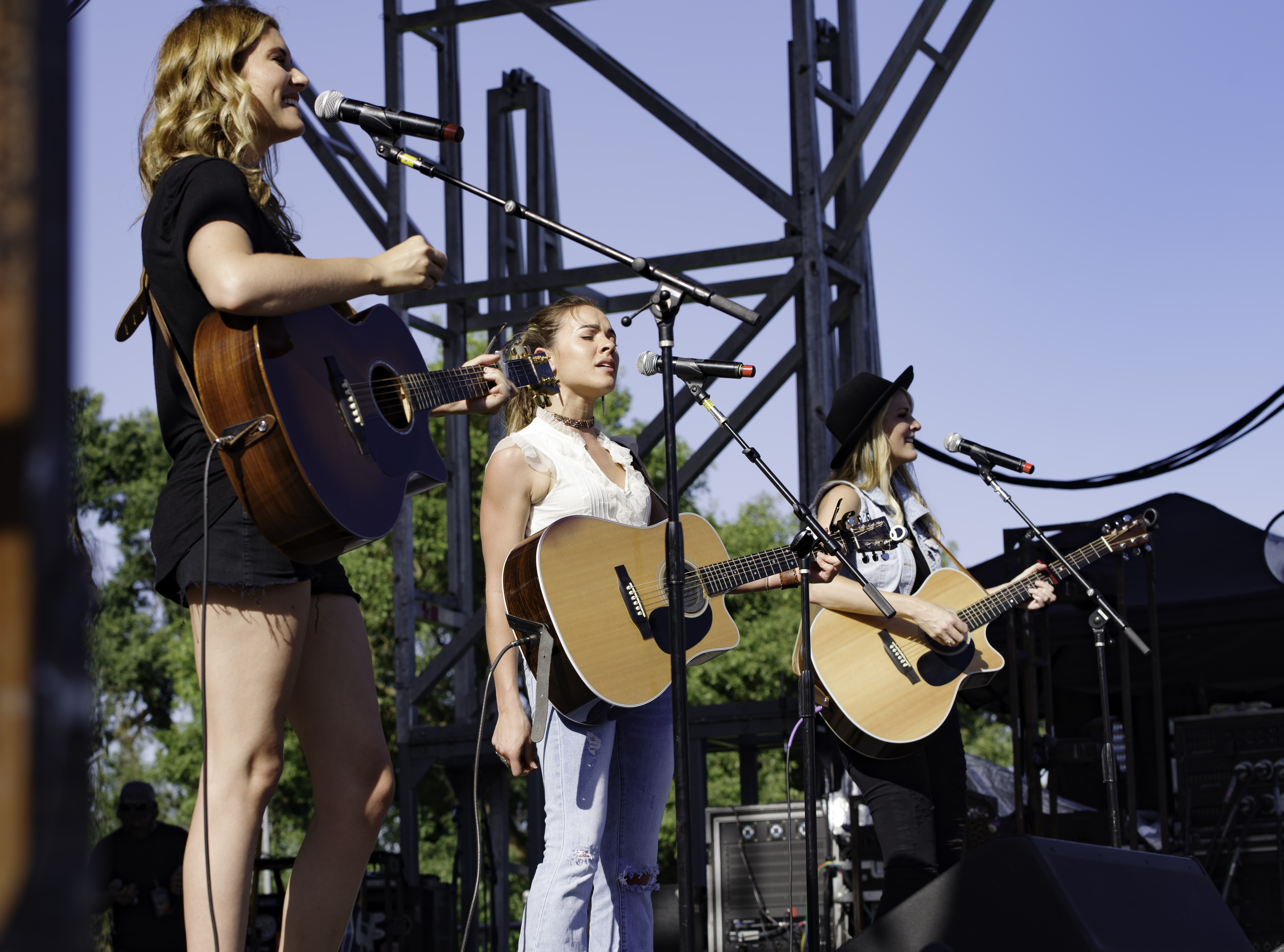
- Runaway June performing at Jugfest in June 2017

Background information
- Origin: Nashville, Tennessee, U.S.
- Genres: Country
- Years active: 2015–present
- Labels: Wheelhouse; Quartz Hill
- Spinoff of: Stealing Angels; Natalie Stovall and the Drive
- Members: Jennifer Wayne; Natalie Stovall; Stevie Woodward
- Past members: Hannah Mulholland; Naomi Cooke
- Website: www.runawayjune.com

Runaway June is an American country music group consisting of Stevie Woodward (lead vocals, guitar, piano, harmonica, autoharp), Jennifer Wayne (guitar, vocals), and Natalie Stovall (guitar, fiddle, banjo, mandolin, vocals). Wayne co-founded the group in 2015 with Hannah Mulholland (mandolin, vocals) and Naomi Cooke (lead vocals). Wayne was a former member of Stealing Angels and had co-written singles for other singers prior to the group's foundation. Signed to BBR Music Group's Wheelhouse imprint in 2015, the group charted two singles on the Billboard Hot Country Songs and Country Airplay charts prior to their breakthrough hit "Buy My Own Drinks" in 2018. This was the first of three singles from their 2019 studio album Blue Roses. Mulholland quit the group in 2020 and was replaced by Natalie Stovall, former lead singer of Natalie Stovall and the Drive; Cooke quit in 2022 and was replaced by Stevie Woodward.

== Background ==
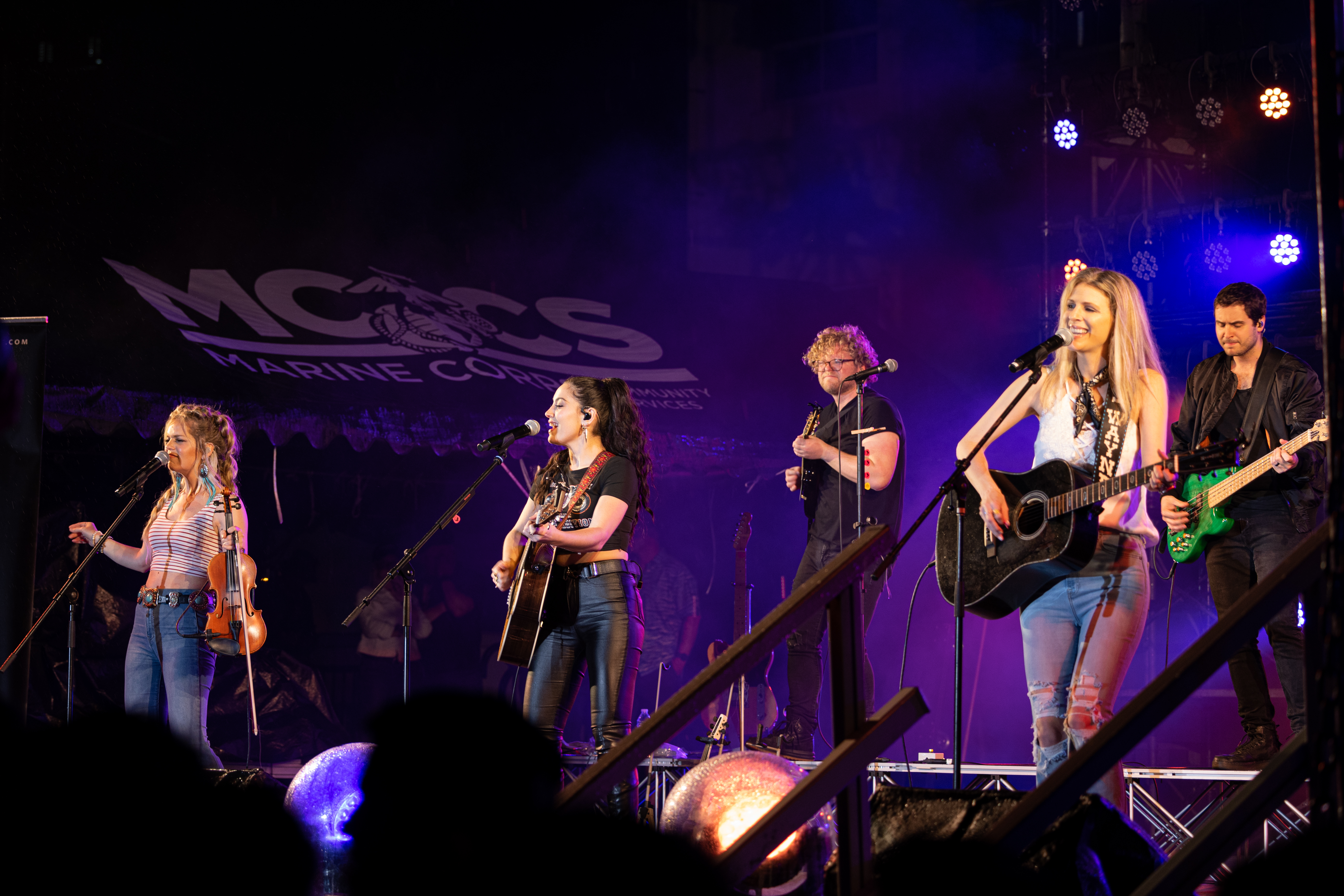
Runaway June performing at the Camp Schwab Festival in March 2023

Jennifer Wayne, a granddaughter of John Wayne, grew up in Southern California, and Hannah Mulholland grew up in Los Angeles, California, while Naomi Cooke is from Cedar Key, Florida. Cooke co-wrote Tyler Farr's top 40 hit "Better in Boots". Wayne was originally a member of the group Stealing Angels, and co-wrote Eric Paslay's top 20 hit "She Don't Love You" and Keith Urban's 2021 hit "Wild Hearts". Under this lineup, Cooke was the lead vocalist, Mulholland was the low harmony vocalist and mandolin player, and Wayne was the high harmony vocalist and guitar player.

The three met in Nashville and wrote their debut single "Lipstick" with assistance from Rebecca Lynn Howard, Caroline Hobby (former member of Stealing Angels), and Elisha Hoffman. The song was released in 2016 via Broken Bow Records' Wheelhouse Records imprint. An uncredited review from Taste of Country praised the "original premise" and vocal harmonies. They released their self-titled debut EP in September 2018, which featured the singles "Wild West" and "Buy My Own Drinks".

The group was a supporting act for Carrie Underwood on her Cry Pretty Tour 360, which ran from May 1, 2019, to October 31, 2019, alongside Maddie & Tae. On May 23, 2019, the group announced their debut album Blue Roses, which was released on June 28, 2019. "Buy My Own Drinks", which served as the lead-off single, is included on the album alongside three other songs from their previous EP release. The album debuted at No. 36 on the Top Country Albums chart, and No. 2 on the Heatseekers Albums chart. After "Buy My Own Drinks", the band also charted two more singles from the album: "Head over Heels" and "We Were Rich".

On May 14, 2020, Mulholland announced her departure from the group. The following day, Cooke and Wayne confirmed that she was replaced by Natalie Stovall, former lead singer of Natalie Stovall and the Drive, who also plays fiddle. In February 2022, Naomi Cooke departed from the band; she was replaced by Stevie Woodward two months later.

In 2023, Runaway June signed with Quartz Hill Records and released "Make Me Wanna Smoke" as their first single under the new label.

== Discography ==
=== Studio albums ===
List of albums, with selected chart positions, showing year released and album name
Title	Album details	Peak chart positions			Sales
Title	Album details	US Cou.	US Hea.	US Ind.	Sales
Blue Roses	Released: June 28, 2019; Label: Wheelhouse; Format: CD, music download	36	2	10	US: 7,600
New Kind of Emotion	Released: September 19, 2025; Label: Quartz Hill; Formats: CD, Music download, streaming	—	—	—	

=== EPs ===
Title	Details
Runaway June	Released: September 7, 2018; Label: Wheelhouse; Formats: CD, music download
When I Think About Christmas	Released: October 16, 2020; Label: Wheelhouse; Formats: Music download, streaming
Backstory	Released: May 16, 2021; Label: Wheelhouse; Formats: Music download, streaming
Smoke, Wine & Whiskey	Released: January 26, 2024; Label: Quartz Hill; Formats: Music download, streaming

=== Singles ===
List of singles, with selected chart positions, showing relevant details
Title	Year	Peak chart positions				Certifications	Album
Title	Year	US	US Cou.	US Cou. Air.	CAN Cou.	Certifications	Album
"Lipstick"	2016	—	37	28	—		Non-album single
"Wild West"	2017	—	47	36	—		Runaway June
"Buy My Own Drinks"	2018	88	17	8	15	RIAA: Gold	Blue Roses
"Head over Heels"	2019	—	—	41	—		Blue Roses
"We Were Rich"	2020	—	—	37	—		Blue Roses
"Make Me Wanna Smoke"	2023	—	—	57	—		New Kind of Emotion
"New Kind of Emotion"	2025	—	—	—	—		New Kind of Emotion
"—" denotes a recording that did not chart or was not released in that territory.

=== Other charted songs ===
List of singles, with selected chart positions, showing relevant details
Title	Year	Peak chart positions	Album
Title	Year	US Country Airplay	Album
"Sleigh Ride"	2020	45	When I Think About Christmas

=== Music videos ===
Year	Video	Director
2016	"Lipstick"	Peter Zavadil
2017	"Wild West"	Traci Goudie
2019	"Buy My Own Drinks"	Peter Zavadil
2019	"Buy My Own Drinks" (live)	Justin Key
2020	"We Were Rich"	Patrick Tracy
2020	"Sleigh Ride"	Cody Heckber

== Awards and nominations ==
Year	Award	Category	Work	Result
2018	53rd Academy of Country Music Awards	New Vocal Duo or Group of the Year	Themselves	Nominated
2019	CMT Music Awards	Breakthrough Video of the Year	"Buy My Own Drinks"	Nominated

== Tours ==
Supporting

- Cry Pretty Tour 360 (2019) supporting Carrie Underwood with Maddie & Tae
- Proud to Be Right Here Tour (2020) supporting Luke Bryan
