= Nicolle Galyon =

- Born: Nicolle Anne Galyon; July 22, 1984 (age 42); Winner, South Dakota
- Origin: Sterling, Kansas
- Genre: Country
- Occupations: Singer; songwriter; record producer; record label executive; publishing executive
- Instruments: Vocals; keyboard; piano
- Years active: 2007–present
- Website: nicollegalyon.com

Nicolle Anne Galyon (born July 22, 1984) is an American singer, songwriter, producer, record label executive, and publishing executive based in Nashville. She gained national exposure early in her career after a 2012 appearance as a contestant on NBC's The Voice. She co-wrote the song "Automatic" sung by Miranda Lambert which was named the 2015 ACM's 'Song of the Year' and the 2014 CMA's single of the year. In 2019, she was named BMI Country Songwriter of the Year and was the first woman to win the award since Taylor Swift took home the award in 2010. As of 2025, she is credited for writing 10 No. 1 hits. Galyon has written songs for Lady A, Keith Urban, Kenny Chesney, Dan + Shay, Florida Georgia Line, and others.

== Career ==
Originally from Sterling, Kansas, Galyon made her way to Nashville, Tennessee in 2002 to attend Belmont University for Music Business. At Belmont, Galyon discovered her passion for songwriting and signed a publishing deal with Warner/Chappell Nashville shortly after graduating in 2006. In 2012, she appeared on season 2 of The Voice as a contestant on Adam Levine's team, then being eliminated in the battle rounds. There she met RaeLynn and Miranda Lambert, two friendships that she accredits for kickstarting her songwriting career.

Galyon earned her first #1 song with "We Were Us" performed by Keith Urban and Miranda Lambert. Soon after this success, veteran Nashville songwriting heavyweights like Shane McAnally and Josh Osborne noticed her and invited her to be a part of their in-the-round performances. Speaking about this later, Galyon said, "I remember it was conflicting for me because I only had one song to play that anyone knew...but they could each play 20 hits, all night long". She said that their stamp of approval gave her confidence and kept her going.

With co-writers Miranda Lambert and Natalie Hemby, Galyon won 2015 ACM's 'Song of the Year', and the 2014 CMA's single of the year for the Miranda Lambert's Automatic. Since then Galyon has had songs recorded by RaeLynn on her album WildHorse, Dan + Shay on their album Obsessed, Kenny Chesney on his album Cosmic Hallelujah, Florida Georgia Line on their album Dig Your Roots, Lady Antebellum on their album Golden, and Thomas Rhett on his album Tangled Up, among others.

== Record label ==
Galyon partnered with Big Loud Records to launch the female-focused record label, "Songs and Daughters". The label was announced in July, 2019 and signed Madison Kozak as its flagship artist. In 2020, Galyon expanded the label to include a publishing arm. In 2020, Galyon served as a producer and writer on iHeartRadio scripted podcast "Make It Up As We Go."

== Philanthropy ==
Galyon is heavily involved in the CMA Foundation's music education initiative and served as an NSAI Board Member & CMT Next Women of Country mentor. Galyon has worked with the "Save the Music Foundation", a non-profit music education organization and with "Songfarm", a philanthropic organization designed to give U.S.high schools professional recording equipment for students to use. She also provides a college scholarship to a senior at her alma mater, Sterling High School, each year through an "Autobiography Scholarship" program.

== Personal life ==
Galyon married songwriter Rodney Clawson on October 13, 2007. They have two children together, daughter Charlie Jo Clawson born May 29, 2013, and son Ford Sterling Clawson born April 14, 2015.

== Discography ==
=== Studio albums ===
- firstborn (2022)

=== Songwriting credits ===
Year	Artist	Album	Song	Co-written with
2010	Point of Grace	Home for the Holidays	"The Giver and the Gift"	Molly Reed, Jonathan Yudkin
2011	Josh Kelley	Georgia Clay	"Gone Like That"	Josh Kelley, Clint Lagerberg
2011	Jasmine Rae	Listen Here	"Let it Be Me"	Molly Reed
2011	Lauren Alaina	Wildflower	"Growing Her Wings"	Nicole Witt
2011	Lauren Alaina	Wildflower	"Dirt Road Prayer"	April Geesbreght
2013	Lady A	Golden	"It Ain't Pretty"	Eric Paslay
2013	Keith Urban	Fuse	"We Were Us" (feat. Miranda Lambert)	Jon Nite, Jimmy Robbins
2013	Danielle Bradbery	Danielle Bradbery	"Daughter of a Workin' Man"	Dave Barnes, Clint Lagerberg
2013	Danielle Bradbery	Danielle Bradbery	"Dance Hall"	April Geesbreght, Molly Reed
2014	Dan + Shay	Where It All Began	"Party Girl"	Shay Mooney, Dan Smyers
2014	Florida Georgia Line	Anything Goes	"All Nighter"	Tyler Hubbard, Brian Kelley, Jimmy Robbins
2014	Lady A	747	"Girl on the Radio"	David Hodges, Jimmy Robbins
2014	Lucy Hale	Road Between	"From the Backseat"	Mike Daly, Jimmy Robbins
2014	Miranda Lambert	Platinum	"Girls"	Natalie Hemby, Jimmy Robbins
2014	Miranda Lambert	Platinum	"Priscilla"	Natalie Hemby, Jimmy Robbins
2014	Miranda Lambert	Platinum	"Babies Makin' Babies"	Natalie Hemby, Jimmy Robbins
2014	Miranda Lambert	Platinum	"Platinum"	Natalie Hemby, Miranda Lambert
2014	Miranda Lambert	Platinum	"Automatic"	Natalie Hemby, Miranda Lambert
2014	Chase Rice	Ignite the Night	"What's Your Name"	Zack Crowell, Matt Jenkins
2015	RaeLynn	Me EP	"God Made Girls"	RaeLynnm Lori McKenna, Liz Rose
2015	RaeLynn	Me EP	"Boyfriend"	Hailey Steele, Rachel Woodward
2015	RaeLynn	Always Sing	"Always Sing"	RaeLynn, Jimmy Robbins
2015	Nashville Cast	Trouble	"Trouble"	Chris Roberts
2015	Michael Ray	Michael Ray	"Wish I Was Here"	Nathan Chapman, Matt Jenkins
2015	Thomas Rhett	Tangled Up	"Anthem"	Shane McAnally, Jimmy Robbins
2015	Thomas Rhett	Tangled Up	"Learned It From the Radio"	Ashley Gorley, Jimmy Robbins
2016	Martina McBride	Reckless	"It Ain't Pretty"	Eric Paslay
2016	Martina McBride	Reckless	"Diamond"	Eric Paslay, Liz Rose
2016	Dan + Shay	Obsessed	"All Nighter"	David Hodges, Jimmy Robbins
2016	Dan + Shay	Obsessed	"Lipstick"	Shay Mooney, Dan Smyers
2016	RaeLynn	—N/a	"Love Triangle"	RaeLynn, Jimmy Robbins
2016	Fantasia	The Definition Of...	"Ugly"	Audra Mae
2016	Florida Georgia Line	Dig Your Roots	"Smooth"	Tyler Hubbard, Brian Kelley, Jordan Schmidt
2016	Kenny Chesney	Cosmic Hallelujah	"All the Pretty Girls"	Tommy Lee James, Josh Osborne
2016	High Valley	Dear Life	"The Only"	N/A
2016	Miranda Lambert	The Weight of These Wings	"Six Degrees of Separation"	N/A
2017	RaeLynn	WildHorse	"Your Heart"	RaeLynn, Jimmy Robbins
2017	RaeLynn	WildHorse	"Love Triangle"	RaeLynn, Jimmy Robbins
2017	RaeLynn	WildHorse	"Insecure"	RaeLynn, Jimmy Robbins
2017	RaeLynn	WildHorse	"Graveyard"	RaeLynn, Jimmy Robbins
2017	RaeLynn	WildHorse	"Lonely Call"	RaeLynn, Rob Hawkins
2017	RaeLynn	WildHorse	"The Apple"	Marshall Altman, Emily Weisband
2017	RaeLynn	WildHorse	"Young"	RaeLynn, Leeland Mooring
2017	RaeLynn	WildHorse	"Praying for Rain"	RaeLynn, Leeland Mooring
2017	Kenny Chesney	—N/a	"All the Pretty Girls"	Tommy Lee James, Josh Osborne
2017	Eli Young Band	Fingerprints	"Saltwater Gospel"	Ross Copperman, Ashley Gorley
2017	Lady A	Heart Break	"Heart Break"	Dave Haywood, Charles Kelley, Hillary Scott, Jesse Frasure
2017	Lady A	Heart Break	"Army"	Dave Haywood, Charles Kelley, Hillary Lindsey, Busbee
2017	Lady A	Heart Break	"Big Love in a Small Town"	Dave Haywood, Charles Kelley, Hillary Lindsey, Jordan Reynolds
2017	Kelsea Ballerini	Unapologetically	"Music"	Kelsea Ballerini, Jennifer Denmark, Jimmy Robbins
2017	Lee Brice	Lee Brice	"Boy"	Jon Nite
2017	Keith Urban	Graffiti U	"Female"	Ross Copperman, Shane McAnally
2017	Luke Bryan	What Makes You Country	"Win Life"	Rodney Clawson, Ross Copperman
2017	Brandon Ray	Ends of the Earth	"Ends of the Earth"	Ross Copperman, Jon Nite
2017	Danielle Bradbery	I Don't Believe We've Met	"Red Wine+White Couch"	Alysa Vanderheym, Emily Weisband
2017	Walker Hayes	boom.	"Halloween"	Walker Hayes
2017	Eli Young Band	Fingerprints	"Saltwater Gospel"	Ashley Gorley, Ross Copperman
2018	Dan + Shay	Tequila	"Tequila"	Dan Smyers, Jordan Reynolds,
2018	Camila Cabello	Camila	"Consequences"	Amy Wadge, Emily Weisband
2018	Keith Urban	Graffiti U	"Coming Home" (feat. Julia Michaels)	Keith Urban, J.R. Rotem, Julia Michaels, Merle Haggard
2018	Brett Young	Ticket to L.A.	"The Ship and the Bottle"	Chase McGill, Jon Nite
2019	Runaway June	Blue Roses	"We Were Rich"	Ashley Gorley, Ross Copperman
2020	Kelsea Ballerini	Kelsea	"Club"	Jimmy Robbins
2020	Kelsea Ballerini	Kelsea	"Homecoming Queen?"	Jimmy Robbins
2020	Kelsea Ballerini	Kelsea	"Bragger"	Ross Copperman, Jimmy Robbins, Shane McAnally
2020	Kelsea Ballerini	Kelsea	"Half of My Hometown" (feat. Kenny Chesney)	Ross Copperman, Jimmy Robbins, Shane McAnally
2020	Kelsea Ballerini	Kelsea	"A Country Song"	Jimmy Robbins
2020	Gabby Barrett	Goldmine	"Thank God"	Gabby Barrett, Jon Nite, Jimmy Robbins
2020	Dierks Bentley	—N/a	"Gone"	Dierks, Bentley, John Wiggins, Jon Randall
2020	Miranda Lambert	Make It Up As We Go (Soundtrack to the Podcast Musical)	"Champion"	Jeff Peters, Jared Gustadt, Scarlett Burke
2020	Hailey Whitters	—N/a	"Fillin' My Cup" (feat. Little Big Town)	
2020	Sasha Sloan	Only Child	"House With No Mirrors"	Sasha Sloan, Henry Agincourt Allen
2020	Sasha Sloan	Only Child	"Is It Just Me?"	Sasha Sloan, Dallas Koehlke, Stephanie Steph Jones
2020	Danielle Bradbury	—N/a	"Girls In My Hometown"	
2020	Tori Kelly	A Tori Kelly Christmas	"Gift That Keeps On Giving"	Tori Kelly, Jimmy Robbins
2020	LANY	Mama's Boy	"anything 4 u"	Charles Leslie Priest, Jake Goss, Paul Jason Klein
2020	Jamie O'Neal	Sometimes	"Spin the Bottle"	Liz Rose, Carolyn Dawn Johnson
2021	Gary Allan	Ruthless	"Temptation"	Chase McGill, Jon Nie
2021	Gary Allan	Ruthless	"SEX"	Shane McAnally, Matt Jenkins
2021	Kelsea Ballerini	—N/a	"I Quit Drinking" (feat. LANY)	Kelsea Ballerini, Paul Klein
2021	Dan + Shay	—N/a	"Picked Out a Christmas Tree"	Dan Smyers, Dave Barnes, Jordan Reynolds
2021	Devin Dawson	The Pink Slip EP	"He Loved Her	Devin Dawson, Jordan Reynolds
2021	Ashley Monroe	Rosegold	"Flying"	Ashley Monroe, Jordan Reynolds
2021	Carly Pearce	29: Written in Stone	"Your Drinkin', My Problem"	Sasha Stone, Ben West
2021	Blake Shelton	Body Language	"Minimum Wage"	Jesse Frasure, Corey Crowder
2022	Abbey Cone	Hate Me (EP)	"In a Room With You"	Abbey Cone, Nathan Spicer
2022	Carrie Underwood	Denim & Rhinestones	"Drunk and Hungover"	Jordan Reynolds, Hillary Lindsey
2023	Lukas Graham	4 (The Pink Album)	"Home Movies" (with Mickey Guyton)	David LaBrel, Jaramye Daniels, Rory Andrew
2023	Morgan Wallen	One Thing at a Time	"Thought You Should Know"	Morgan Wallen, Miranda Lambert
2024	Luke Grimes	Luke Grimes	"Ghost Of Who We Were"	Luke Grimes, Rodney Clawson
2024	Carly Pearce	Hummingbird	"Rock Paper Scissors"	Carly Pearce, Shane McAnally, Jordan Reynolds
2024	Carly Pearce	Hummingbird	"Oklahoma"	Carly Pearce, Jordan Reynolds
2024	Carly Pearce	Hummingbird	"Fault Line"	Carly Pearce, Shane McAnally, Jordan Reynolds
2024	Carly Pearce	Hummingbird	"Trust Issues"	Carly Pearce, Jordan Reynolds
2024	Carly Pearce	Hummingbird	"Hummingbird"	Carly Pearce, Shane McAnlly, Jordan Reynolds

== Awards and nominations ==
Year	Association	Category	Nominated work	Result
2014	Country Music Association	Song of the Year	"Automatic"	Nominated
2014	Nashville Songwriters Association International	Song of the Year	"Automatic"	Won
2015	Academy of Country Music	Song of the Year	"Automatic"	Won
2015	Grammy Awards	Best Country Song	"Automatic"	Nominated
2018	Academy of Country Music	Song of the Year	"Female"	Nominated
2019	Academy of Country Music	Song of the Year	"Tequila"	Won
2019	BMI	Country Songwriter of the Year		Won
2019	BMI	Song of the Year	"Tequila"	Won
