= Dean Brody discography =

- Studio albums: 8
- EPs: 1
- Singles: 46
- Music videos: 30

Canadian country music singer Dean Brody's discography consists of seven studio albums, one extended play, forty singles (including two as a featured artist), and thirty music videos.

Brody's self-titled debut album—released in 2009 under the independent label Broken Bow Records—debuted at number 187 on the US Billboard 200, and featured four singles, the most notable being "Brothers", which peaked at number 26 on the US Hot Country Songs Chart and number 76 on the Canadian Hot 100.

After signing with Open Road Recordings, Brody released five albums: Trail in Life, Dirt, Crop Circles, Gypsy Road, and Beautiful Freakshow. These albums have produced over twenty collective top-10 singles on Canadian country radio, including the number-one hits "Canadian Girls", "Bounty", and "8th Day". Twelve of his singles have been certified Gold by Music Canada, with eight (including "Bring Down the House") reaching Platinum status.

Upon launching his own independent label, Scurvy Dog Music, Brody has released the album Boys, and landed three consecutive Canadian country number-ones with "Can't Help Myself", "Canadian Summer", and "Boys". He has since achieved three more number-ones with "More Drinkin' Than Fishin'", "Where'd You Learn How to Do That", and "Right Round Here" after signing with Starseed Records, and released the album Right Round Here in 2023.

== Studio albums ==
=== 2000s ===
Title	Album details	Peak chart positions			
Title	Album details	US	US Country	US Heat	US Indie
Dean Brody	Release date: April 28, 2009; Label: Broken Bow; Formats: CD, music download	187	32	4	23

=== 2010s ===
Title	Album details	Peak chart positions	Certifications
Title	Album details	CAN	Certifications
Trail in Life	Release date: August 17, 2010; Label: Open Road; Formats: CD, music download	—	MC: Gold
Dirt	Release date: April 24, 2012; Label: Open Road; Formats: CD, music download	12	MC: Platinum
Crop Circles	Release date: November 5, 2013; Label: Open Road; Formats: CD, music download	17	MC: Gold
Gypsy Road	Release date: April 21, 2015; Label: Open Road; Formats: CD, vinyl, music download	7	MC: Gold
Beautiful Freakshow	Release date: October 21, 2016; Label: Open Road; Formats: CD, music download	15	MC: Gold
"—" denotes releases that did not chart

=== 2020s ===
Title	Album details	Certifications
Boys	Release date: November 17, 2020; Label: Scurvy Dog Music; Formats: Digital download, streaming	MC: Gold
Right Round Here	Release date: September 15, 2023; Label: Starseed; Formats: Digital download, streaming	
The Tenth Album (Side A)	Release date: June 26, 2026; Label: Starseed; Formats: Digital download, streaming	
The Tenth Album (Side B)	To be released; Label: Starseed; Formats: Digital download, streaming	

== Extended plays ==
Title	EP details
Black Sheep	Release date: April 26, 2019; Label: Open Road / Scurvy Dog Music; Formats: CD, music download, streaming

== Singles ==
=== 2000s ===
Title	Year	Peak chart positions			Album
Title	Year	CAN	CAN Country	US Country	Album
"Brothers"	2008	76	10	26	Dean Brody
"Dirt Roads Scholar"	2009	72	5	—	Dean Brody
"Gravity"	2009	—	—	—	Dean Brody
"Undone"	2009	79	6	—	Dean Brody
"—" denotes releases that did not chart or were not released to that territory

=== 2010s ===
Title	Year	Peak chart positions		Certifications	Album
Title	Year	CAN	CAN Country	Certifications	Album
"Wildflower"	2010	86	19		Trail in Life
"Roll That Barrel Out"	2010	69	5		Trail in Life
"Trail in Life"	2010	81	3		Trail in Life
"People Know You by Your First Name"	2011	93	8		Trail in Life
"Little Yellow Blanket"	2011	71	8		Trail in Life
"Canadian Girls"	2012	36	1	MC: 2× Platinum	Dirt
"Bob Marley"	2012	69	3		Dirt
"It's Friday"	2012	60	7	MC: Platinum	Dirt
"Underneath the Apple Trees"	2013	84	12		Dirt
"Dirt"	2013	81	9		Dirt
"Bounty"	2013	46	1	MC: Platinum	Crop Circles
"Crop Circles"	2013	62	9		Crop Circles
"Another Man's Gold"	2014	85	7		Crop Circles
"Mountain Man"	2014	96	13	MC: Gold	Crop Circles
"Upside Down"	2015	80	5		Gypsy Road
"Bring Down the House"	2015	43	7	MC: 3× Platinum	Gypsy Road
"Love Would Be Enough"	2015	100	4		Gypsy Road
"Monterey"	2016	—	7		Gypsy Road
"Bush Party"	2016	—	6	MC: Platinum	Beautiful Freakshow
"Time"	2016	— (Note: "Time" did not enter the Canadian Hot 100, but peaked at number 37 on the Hot Canadian Digital Song Sales chart.)	2	MC: Gold	Beautiful Freakshow
"Beautiful Freakshow" (featuring Shevy Price)	2017	—	24	MC: Platinum	Beautiful Freakshow
"Soggy Bottom Summer" (featuring Alan Doyle)	2017	—	18		Beautiful Freakshow
"8th Day"	2017	—	1		Beautiful Freakshow
"Good Goodbye"	2018	— (Note: "Good Goodbye" did not enter the Canadian Hot 100, but peaked at number 40 on the Hot Canadian Digital Song Sales chart.)	6	MC: Gold	Black Sheep
"Dose of Country"	2018	—	4		Black Sheep
"Whiskey in a Teacup"	2019	69	3	MC: Platinum	Black Sheep
"Black Sheep"	2019	—	5		Black Sheep
"—" denotes releases that did not chart

=== 2020s ===
Title	Year	Peak chart positions		Certifications	Album
Title	Year	CAN	CAN Country	Certifications	Album
"Can't Help Myself" (with the Reklaws)	2020	49	1	MC: 3× Platinum	Boys
"Canadian Summer"	2020	56	1	MC: Platinum	Boys
"Boys" (with Mickey Guyton)	2020	65	1	MC: Gold	Boys
"Lightning Bug"	2021	78	7	MC: Gold	Boys
"More Drinkin' Than Fishin'" (with Jade Eagleson)	2021	81	1	MC: Gold	Honkytonk Revival
"I'd Go to Jail"	2021	73	5	MC: Gold	Boys
"Where'd You Learn How to Do That"	2022	62	1	MC: Platinum	Right Round Here
"You Got the Wrong Guy"	2022	98	4	MC: Gold	Right Round Here
"Broke"	2023	—	37		Right Round Here
"Right Round Here"	2023	86	1	MC: Gold	Right Round Here
"Your Mama Would Hate Me" (with James Barker Band)	2024	—	19		Non-album single
"Drink Around"	2025	—	7		TBA
"A Man Without a Woman"	2026	—	5		The Tenth Album (Side A)
"Death of Me"	2026	—	32		The Tenth Album (Side A)
"—" denotes releases that did not chart

== Other singles ==
=== Promotional singles ===
Title	Year	Peak chart positions	Album
Title	Year	CAN Digital	Album
"Marianne"	2013	—	Crop Circles
"Hillbilly"	2015	—	Gypsy Road
"Sweet Lola"	2015	—	Gypsy Road
"Footprints of a Giant"	2015	—	Gypsy Road
"Bucket List"	2020	41	Boys
"Paint the Town Redneck"	2023	—	Right Round Here
"Friend of Mine"	2025	*	TBA
"Good Man"	2026	*	The Tenth Album (Side A)
"—" denotes releases that did not chart "*" denotes releases where no chart existed

=== Christmas singles ===
Year	Title	Peak chart positions	Album
Year	Title	CAN Country	Album
2011	"The Woodshed Is Full"	31	CMT Gift of Giving
2012	"Coffee Shop Angel"	—	Non-album single

=== Guest singles ===
Year	Title	Artist	Peak positions	Album
Year	Title	Artist	CAN Country	Album
2013	"I'm Movin' On"	Terri Clark	28	Classic
2019	"We Don’t Wanna Go Home"	Alan Doyle	43	Rough Side Out
2026	"Hometown Heroes"	The Reklaws	6	TBA

== Music videos ==
Year	Video	Director
2009	"Brothers"	Stephen Scott
2009	"Dirt Road Scholar"	Erwin Brothers
2010	"Wildflower"	Jeth Weinrich
2010	"Roll That Barrel Out"	Jeth Weinrich
2010	"Trail in Life"	Jeth Weinrich
2011	"People Know You by Your First Name"	Jeth Weinrich
2011	"The Woodshed Is Full"	
2012	"Canadian Girls"	Christopher Mills
2012	"Bob Marley"	Stephano Barberis
2012	"It's Friday" (with Great Big Sea)	Jeth Weinrich
2012	"Coffee Shop Angel"	Stephano Barberis
2013	"Underneath the Apple Trees"	Stephano Barberis
2013	"I'm Movin' On" (with Terri Clark)	
2013	"Dirt" (live)	
2013	"Bounty"	Margaret Malandruccolo
2014	"Crop Circles"	
2014	"Another Man's Gold"	Jeth Weinrich
2014	"Mountain Man"	Dan LeMoyne
2015	"Upside Down"	Margaret Malandruccolo
2015	"Bring Down the House"	
2015	"Love Would Be Enough"	
2016	"Monterey"	
2016	"Bush Party"	
2016	"Time"	Stephano Barberis
2017	"Beautiful Freakshow"	
2018	"Dose of Country"	
2019	"Black Sheep"	
2020	"Can't Help Myself" (with The Reklaws)	Ben Knechtel
2021	"More Drinkin' Than Fishin'" (with Jade Eagleson)	Ben Knechtel
2022	"I'd Go to Jail"	
