= Alan Doyle =

Canadian musician and actor

Alan Doyle CM ONL
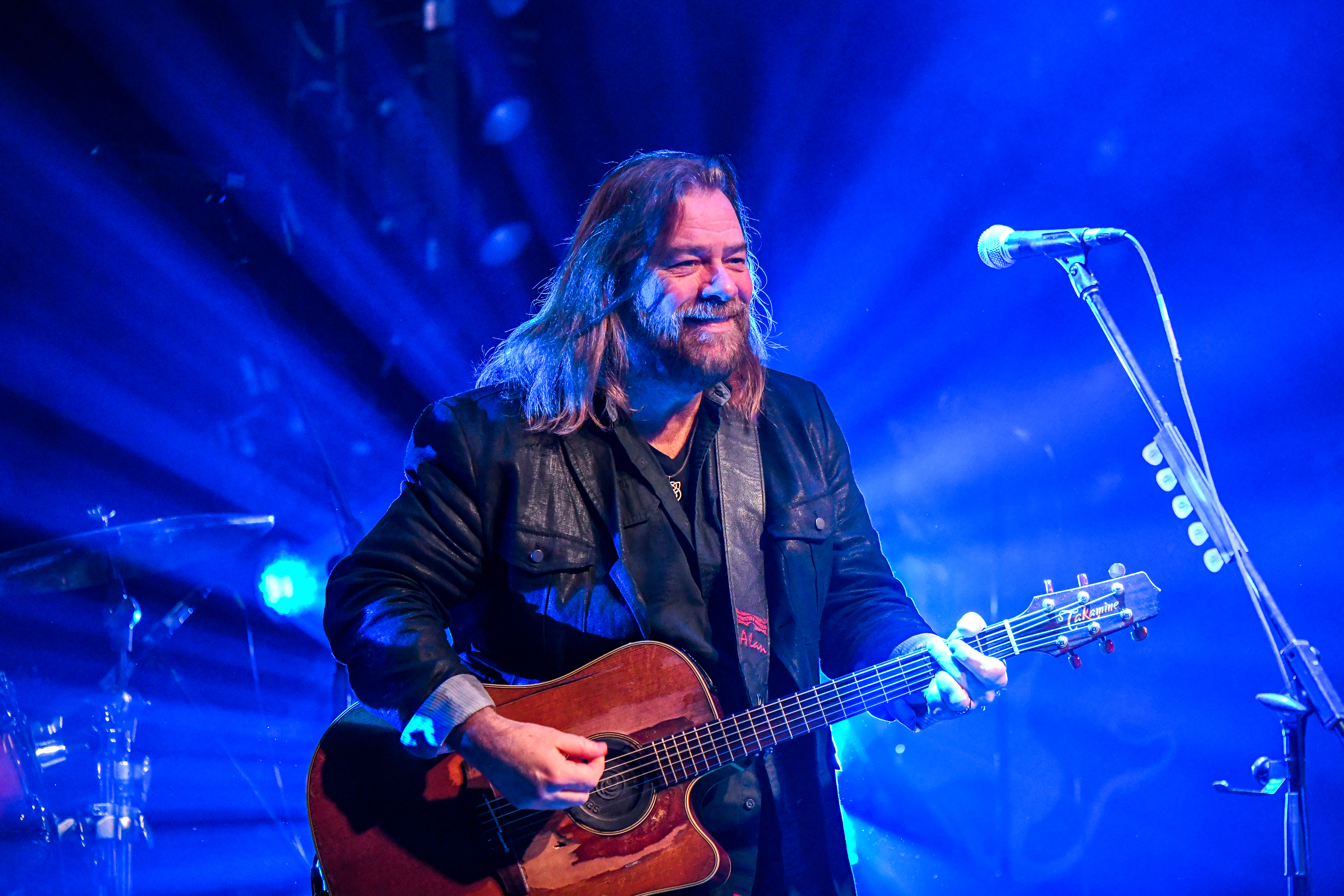
- Doyle in 2023

Background information
- Born: Alan Thomas Doyle; May 17, 1969 (age 57); Petty Harbour, Newfoundland
- Genres: Folk rock
- Occupations: Musician, producer, songwriter, actor
- Instruments: Singing, mandolin, acoustic guitar, bouzouki, electric guitar,
- Years active: 1993–present
- Website: alandoyle.ca, www.greatbigsea.com

Alan Thomas Doyle CM ONL (born May 17, 1969) is a Canadian musician and founding member of the Canadian folk rock band Great Big Sea.

== Life and career ==
Alan Doyle was born and raised in Petty Harbour, Newfoundland, in a Roman Catholic family. He attended Memorial University of Newfoundland in St. John's, where he received a Bachelor of Arts degree in English. It is also there that he met Séan McCann, Bob Hallett and Darrell Power with whom he formed Great Big Sea. He primarily plays electric and acoustic guitars, and the bouzouki for live performances, but he has been known to play mandolin and banjo.

He is married to Joanne; they have one son.

Doyle has also been involved with a handful of stage, television and film productions. As a child, he appeared as an extra in the movie A Whale for the Killing, based on Farley Mowat's book of the same name, which was filmed in his hometown. He has also hosted regional arts awards shows in Atlantic Canada, appeared as a presenter on the Juno Awards and done a turn onstage in his hometown's "24-Hour Musical" performance of Grease. In 2005, he composed music for the CBC comedy Hatching, Matching and Dispatching, which stars Mary Walsh. In 2006, he worked on scoring the film Young Triffie's Been Made Away With, directed by Walsh.

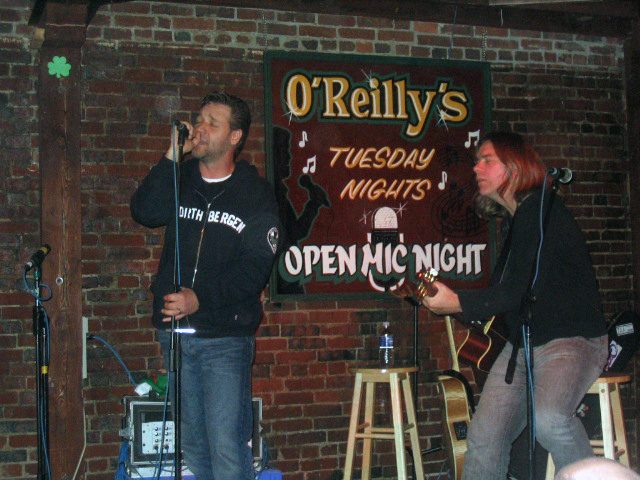
Russell Crowe & Alan Doyle

Doyle has been linked to Russell Crowe and his bands 30 Odd Foot of Grunts and The Ordinary Fear of God, having produced and co-written several songs on Crowe's album, My Hand, My Heart, and played several shows with Crowe. In 2011, they released The Crowe/Doyle Songbook Vol.III with nine songs in both acoustic demo and finished format, for 18 tracks total. This friendship also led to Doyle's casting as Allan A'Dayle alongside Crowe, Cate Blanchett, Kevin Durand, and Scott Grimes in Ridley Scott's Robin Hood, released May 14, 2010. He played Dingy in the film Winter's Tale, also with Crowe and Durand, as well as Will Smith and Colin Farrell.

He collaborated with Law & Order music composer Mike Post and wrote and performed a song named "Middle of Nowhere", written for the Law & Order: Criminal Intent episode "Broad Channel".

Doyle has guest starred on five episodes of the CBC Television series Republic of Doyle as the character Wolf Redmond. Season 2, episode 2 introduced him as an inmate sent to prison on charges of B&Es and a few robberies. Doyle guest starred with Russell Crowe, Kevin Durand, and Scott Grimes on the first show of Republic of Doyle's third season after the four had costarred on Robin Hood. His third appearance – the second with Grimes – was on season 4, episode 6. Both Grimes and Doyle appeared together twice more in season 5 and 6. He appeared in an episode of Murdoch Mysteries' tenth season.

In 2012, Doyle released his first solo album, Boy on Bridge. The title is a nod to Doyle's credit as the "boy on bridge" in the movie A Whale for the Killing, when he was a young boy. The first single from the album is "I've Seen a Little" and the album features collaborations with Canadian musicians Hawksley Workman, Jim Cuddy, Ron Hynes, and actor-musician Russell Crowe, among others. The video for the second single, "Testify", was nominated for a 2012 Juno. The creation of the album was captured by a film crew, resulting in a documentary also named Boy on Bridge directed by Joel Stewart and John Vatcher.

Doyle, with Great Big Sea, was featured on Canadian country artist, Dean Brody's 2012 album titled Dirt, singing on the track "It's Friday".

In 2014, Doyle released a book entitled Where I Belong, about his youth growing up in Newfoundland and Labrador.

Doyle's second solo album, entitled So Let's Go, was released January 20, 2015.

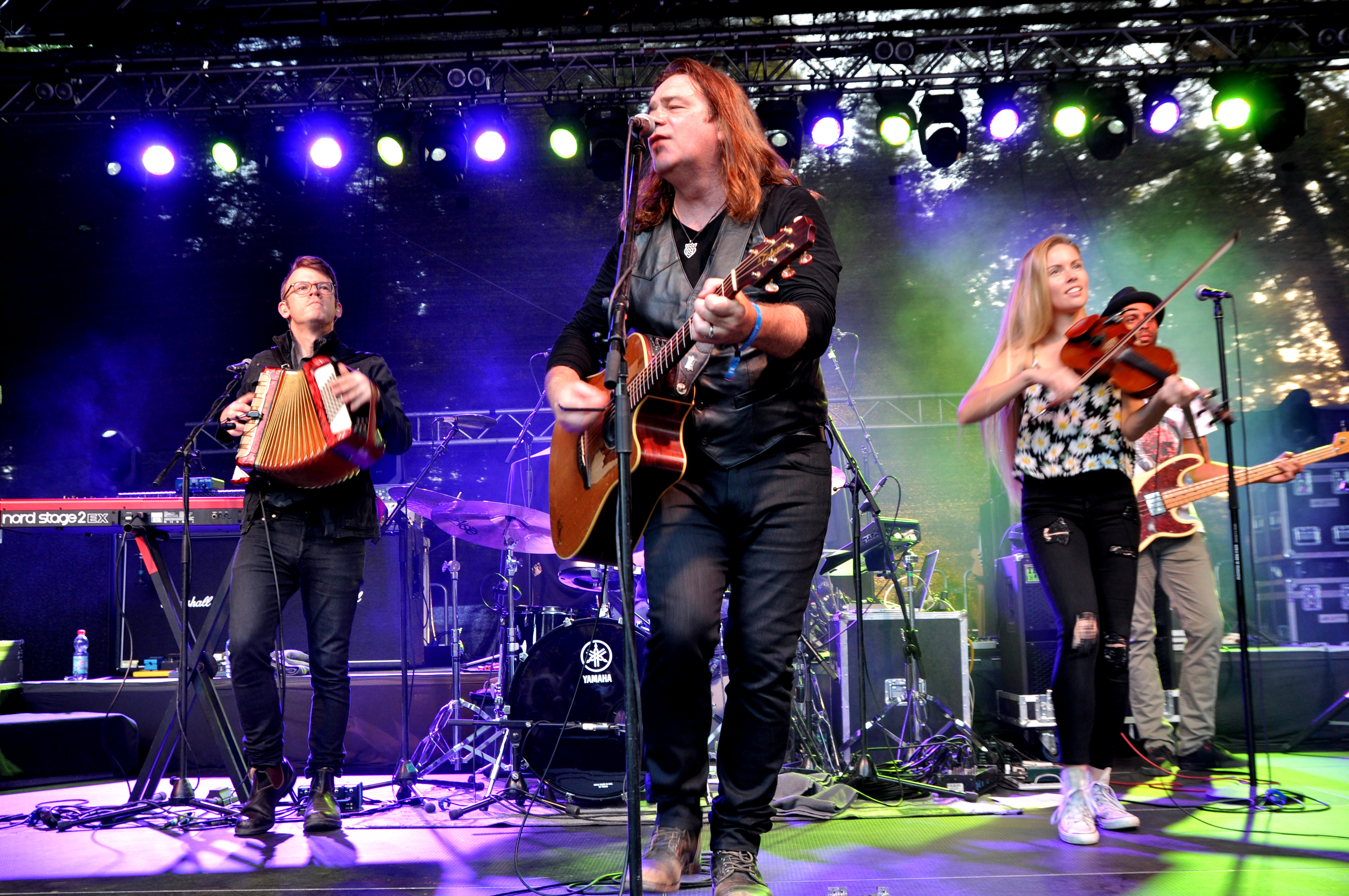
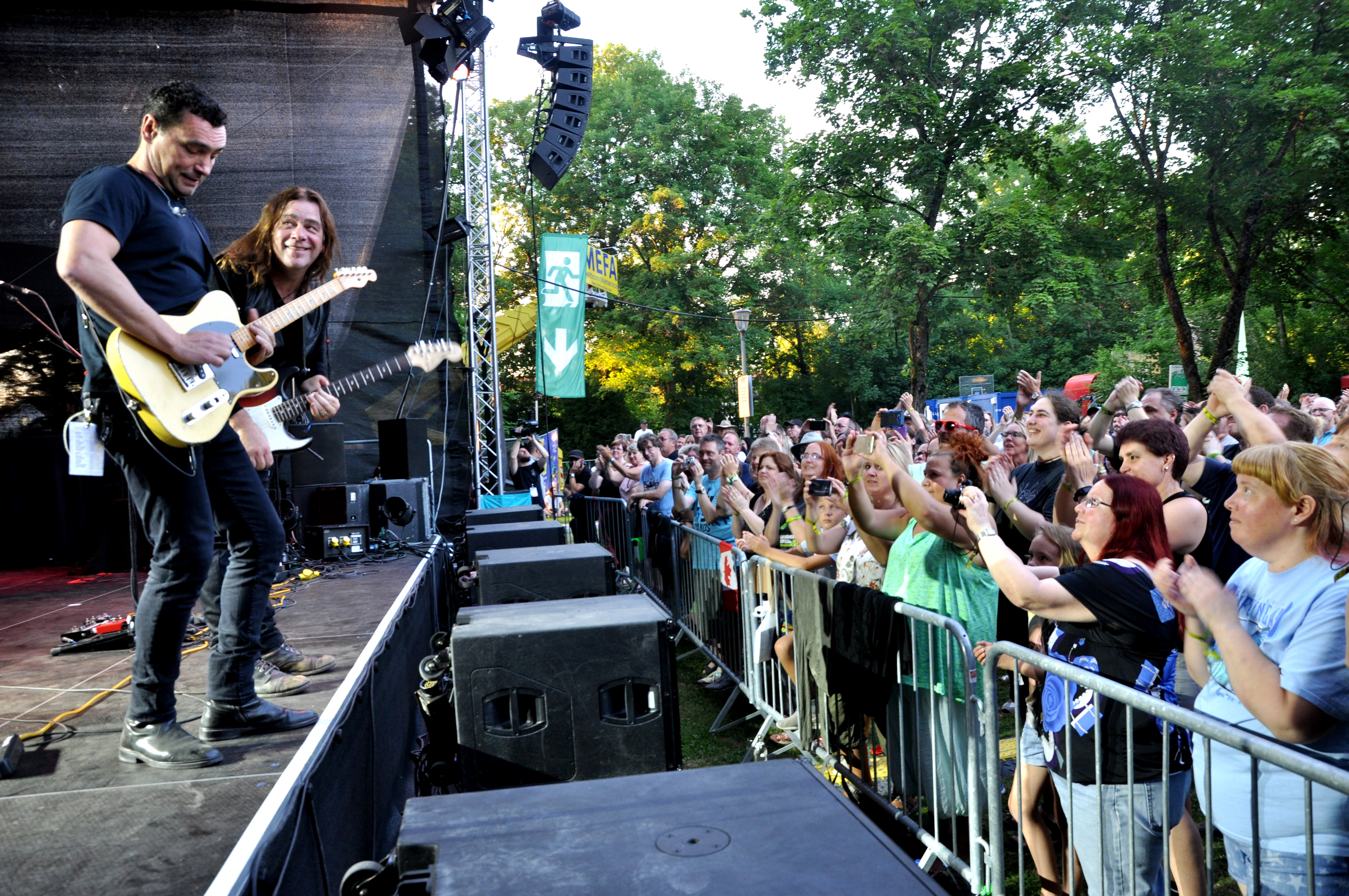
Alan Doyle and band at the 2017 Blacksheep Festival

In 2017, he guest starred in a Murdoch Mysteries episode, "A Murdog Mystery" as a man who claims to be a time travelling historian. Doyle reprised the role in the web series Beyond Time.

Doyle's third solo album, A Week at the Warehouse, was released on October 13, 2017. His second book titled A Newfoundlander in Canada: Always Going Somewhere, Always Coming Home, was released on October 17.

During the early days of the COVID-19 pandemic quarantine, Doyle started remotely collaborating with several Newfoundland-based artists to create a special "isolation edition" EP entitled, Songs from Home, which was released in November 2020. Contributing artists included Fortunate Ones, Rachel Cousins, The Ennis Sisters, and The Once. Per Doyle, Songs From Home is all about making and keeping connections at a time when it was so difficult to be connected.

On June 14, 2022, he began starring in a musical comedy called Tell Tale Harbour at the 2022 Charlottetown Festival. The story is based on the screenplay La grande séduction by Ken Scott that was made into the 2003 award winning film Seducing Doctor Lewis. Doyle was co-writer of the production as well as co-writer of music and lyrics with Bob Foster. Also credited as one of the authors for a book of the musical with award-winning writer Edward Riche.

Doyle, with Keith Power, writes the music for the Canadian comedy series Son of a Critch, for which they have received Canadian Screen Awards nominations for Best Original Music, Comedy in 2023 and 2024.

== Discography ==
=== Albums ===
Title	Details	Peak chart positions		
Title	Details	CAN	US Heat	US Folk
Boy on Bridge	Release date: May 16, 2012; Label: Universal Music Canada	11	37	20
So Let's Go	Release date: January 20, 2015; Label: Universal Music Canada	13	—	—
A Week at the Warehouse	Release date: October 13, 2017; Label: Universal Music Canada	26	—	—
Welcome Home	Release date: February 9, 2024; Label: Skinner’s Hill Music, Warner Music Canada	—	—	—
Already Dancing	Release date: February 20, 2026; Label: Skinner’s Hill Music, Warner Music Canada	—	—	—
"—" denotes releases that did not chart

=== Extended plays ===
Title	Details	Peak chart positions	Sales
Title	Details	CAN	Sales
Rough Side Out	Release date: February 14, 2020; Label: Skinner's Hill	2	US: 400
Back to the Harbour	Release date: May 21, 2021; Label: Skinner's Hill	—	—

=== Singles ===
Year	Single	Peak chart positions	Album
Year	Single	CAN Country	Album
2012	"I've Seen a Little"	—	Boy on Bridge
2012	"Testify"	—	Boy on Bridge
2014	"So Let's Go"	—	So Let's Go
2015	"The Night Loves Us"	—	So Let's Go
2017	"Summer Summer Night"	—	A Week at the Warehouse
2017	"Bully Boys"	—	A Week at the Warehouse
2019	"We Don't Wanna Go Home" (featuring Dean Brody)	43	Rough Side Out
2020	"What the Whisky Won't Do" (featuring Jess Moskaluke)	—	Rough Side Out
2023	"Welcome Home"	—	Welcome Home
2025	"Hey Moon (A Campfire Song)"	—	Songs from the Gang

=== Guest singles ===
Year	Single	Artist	Peak positions	Album
Year	Single	Artist	CAN Country	Album
2017	"Soggy Bottom Summer"	Dean Brody	18	Beautiful Freakshow
2020	"A Tennessee Whisky and a Newfoundland Song"	Various	—	Songs From Home
2020	"It's OK" (isolation edition)	Various	—	Songs From Home

=== Music videos ===
Year	Video	Director
2012	"I've Seen a Little"	Margaret Malandruccolo
2012	"Testify"	Margaret Malandruccolo
2013	"My Day"	Shehab Illyas
2015	"So Let's Go"	Margaret Malandruccolo
2015	"The Night Loves Us"	Shehab Illyas
2015	"1,2,3,4" (with Ed Robertson)	Sean Smith/Joel Stewart
2017	"Summer Summer Night"	
2018	"Beautiful To Me"	Steph Young
2020	"It's OK" (Songs from Home) (with Fortunate Ones, Rachel Cousins, The Ennis Sisters, and The Once)	Alan Doyle
2021	"Back Home on the Island"	Cody Westman

== Honours ==
- Canadian Version of the Queen Elizabeth II Diamond Jubilee Medal in 2012.
- Member of the Order of Canada (CM) on May 10, 2018.
- Member of the Order of Newfoundland and Labrador on October 4, 2022.
