= Heartland (Nelly album) =

Studio album by Nelly
- Released: August 27, 2021
- Genre: Pop; country; hip hop
- Length: 26:30
- Label: Columbia
- Producer: Ash Bowers; Dirty615; Jacob Durrett; Jimmie Allen; Jordan Dozzi; Jordan Schmidt; Matt Dragstrem; Sam Sumser; Spencer Small; Zach Kale

Nelly chronology
M.O. (2013)	Heartland (2021)

Singles from Heartland
- 1. "Lil Bit" Released: October 23, 2020; 2. "High Horse" Released: August 6, 2021

Heartland is the eighth studio album by American rapper Nelly and his first album in eight years. It was released on August 27, 2021, via Columbia Records. It features guest appearances from Florida Georgia Line, Blanco Brown, Breland, Chris Bandi, City Spud, Darius Rucker, George Birge, Jimmie Allen and Kane Brown. The album peaked at number 45 on the US Billboard 200 and at number 37 in Canada.

== Promotion ==
On August 24, 2021, Nelly performed "High Horse" with Breland and Blanco Brown on Jimmy Kimmel Live!. On September 1, he performed "Lil Bit" with Florida Georgia Line on CMT Crossroads.

== Critical reception ==
Professional ratings
Review scores
Source	Rating
AllMusic	2.5/5 stars
Exclaim!	6/10
Tom Hull – on the Web	B

AllMusic's Stephen Thomas Erlewine critiqued that Nelly's lone solo track "5 Drinks Ago" seems to underscore how he fades in the background of his own album, but concluded that: "Nevertheless, the mini-album does precisely what it intended to do: it's a chill time, perfect for pop, country, or hip-hop playlists or anything in between." Louis Pavlakos of Exclaim! felt that the record works best when it delivers "radio-friendly bangers ("High Horse")" and is a mixed bag when utilizing modern country music conventions, criticizing "Someone Somewhere" and "Follow Me" for their lackluster "uplifting nature" but praised "5 Drinks Ago" for Nelly's vulnerability and being able to deliver the genre on his own. He concluded that: "Heartland probably won't make a mark outside of major cities in the U.S., but it's still Nelly's best album in over a decade, mainly because it takes risks he hadn't taken since his Country Grammar era. It may be far from perfect, but a reinvigorated Nelly is a welcome addition to an already stacked year in hip hop."

== Commercial performance ==
In the United States, Heartland debuted at number 45 on the Billboard 200 with 13,000 album-equivalent units. It serves as Nelly's first album to debut in the top-ten of the Top Country Albums, reaching number seven on the chart.

== Track listing ==
Heartland track listing
No.	Title	Writer(s)	Producer(s)	Length
1.	"Lil Bit" (with Florida Georgia Line)	Tyler Hubbard; Blake Redferrin; Cornell Haynes Jr.; Jordan Schmidt	Schmidt	3:15
2.	"High Horse" (with Breland and Blanco Brown)	Sam Sumser; Spencer Small; Rocky Block; Daniel Breland; Bennie Amey III; Matt Thomas; Haynes, Jr.; Dean Dillon; Frank Dycus; Alan Mevis	Sumser; Small	2:32
3.	"Grits & Glamour" (with Kane Brown)	Sumser; Small; Breland; Block; Sam Hunt; Haynes, Jr.	Sumser; Small	2:53
4.	"Ms. Drive Me Crazy" (with Darius Rucker and City Spud)	Ernest Keith Smith; Jacob Durrett; Craig Wiseman; Haynes, Jr.; Lavell Webb	Durrett	3:03
5.	"Country Boy Do" (with Tyler Hubbard)	Schmidt	Schmidt	3:02
6.	"Someone Somewhere" (with George Birge)	Michael Hardy; Durrett; Smith; Haynes, Jr.	Ash Bowers; Durrett	2:58
7.	"5 Drinks Ago"	Haynes, Jr.; Corey Crowder; Rhett Akins; Matt Dragstre	Matt Dragstrem; Dirty615; Jordan Dozzi	3:20
8.	"Follow Me" (with Chris Bandi)	Zach Kale; Haynes, Jr.	Zach Kale; Bowers	2:49
9.	"Good Times Roll" (with Jimmie Allen)	Jimmie Allen; Zach Kale; Haynes, Jr.	Allen; Bowers	2:38
Total length:				26:30

== Charts ==
=== Weekly charts ===
Weekly chart performance for Heartland
Chart (2021)	Peak position
Canadian Albums (Billboard)	37
US Billboard 200	45
US Top Country Albums (Billboard)	7

=== Year-end charts ===
Year-end chart performance for Heartland
Chart (2021)	Position
US Top Country Albums (Billboard)	76

== Certifications ==
Certifications for Heartland
Region	Certification	Certified units/sales
United States (RIAA)	Gold	500,000^{‡}
^{‡} Sales+streaming figures based on certification alone.
