= 8th Day (song) =

Single by Dean Brody

from the album Beautiful Freakshow
- Released: November 1, 2017
- Genre: Country
- Length: 3:02
- Label: Open Road
- Songwriters: Dean Brody; Matt Rovey
- Producer: Matt Rovey

Dean Brody singles chronology
"Soggy Bottom Summer" (2017)	"8th Day" (2017)	"Good Goodbye" (2018)

"8th Day" is a song written and recorded by Canadian country music artist Dean Brody for his sixth studio album, Beautiful Freakshow (2016). The song was co-written and produced by Matt Rovey. It was released to Canadian country radio November 1, 2017 as the album's fifth single. In March 2018, the song became Brody's third number-one on the Canada Country airplay chart.

== Content ==
"8th Day" is a traditional-leaning country song with lyrics that celebrate farmers and country girls. Inspired by the biblical passage outlining what God created on the first days of existence, the song "pays homage to strong, confident and sometimes-complicated women who were finely crafted to be in this world." Its celebratory nature has been compared to that of Brody's first chart-topper, "Canadian Girls" (2012).

== Release and promotion ==
"8th Day" was released to radio on November 1, 2017. The following week, November 8, was dubbed "National Country Girls Day." Fans were encouraged to share stories of the country girls in their life to social media using the pseudo-holiday as a hashtag as part of a week-long promotional campaign to win a signed poster from Brody.

== Charts ==
"8th Day" reached number one on the Canada Country chart dated March 3, 2018. This earned Brody his third number one on the chart, and first since "Bounty" reached the summit in 2013.

Chart (2017–18)	Peak position
Canada Country (Billboard)	1
