= Boy on Bridge =

Studio album by Alan Doyle
- Released: May 15, 2012
- Recorded: 2011
- Genres: Folk, rock
- Length: 47:01
- Labels: Universal Music Canada, Skinner's Hill Music Ltd.

Alan Doyle chronology
Boy on Bridge (2012)	So Let's Go (2015)

Boy on Bridge is an album by Alan Doyle, released in 2012. It was his first solo album. Until then, he had not released a solo album in the 19 years he had been in Great Big Sea.

The album title is a reference to Doyle's IMDb page, in which he is credited as playing a boy on bridge in the 1981 TV movie A Whale for the Killing.

== Track listing ==
No.	Title	Writer(s)	Length
1.	"Sorry"	Alan Doyle, Hawksley Workman	3:21
2.	"I've Seen a Little"	Doyle, Gordie Sampson, Troy Verges	3:31
3.	"My Day"	Doyle, Ryan Tyndall	3:07
4.	"Where the Nightingales Sing"	Doyle, Sampson, Kelly Archer	3:29
5.	"Testify" (feat. Colin James)	Russell Crowe, Doyle	4:13
6.	"Break It Slow"	Doyle	3:49
7.	"Love While Love's Awake"	Doyle, Workman	3:25
8.	"Light the Way"	Doyle, Sean Panting	3:38
9.	"Northern Plains" (feat. Jim Cuddy)	Doyle, Workman	4:02
10.	"Lover's Hands"	Crowe, Doyle	3:55
11.	"Perfect Excuse"	Doyle, Panting	3:17
12.	"The Rules Will All Be Broken"	Doyle, Mike Post	3:34
13.	"Where I Belong"	Crowe, Doyle	3:40
Total length:			47:01

== Chart performance ==
Chart (2012)	Peak position
Canadian Albums Chart	11
US Folk Albums	20
US Heatseekers Albums	37

== Singles ==
The lead single off the album, "I've Seen a Little", was released March 26, 2012, by Universal Music Canada in Canada and Skinner's Hill Music Ltd. in the United States. It is a digital-only release for sale at digital music outlets. The single version of the song is the same version that appears on Boy on Bridge.
