= A Week at the Warehouse =

Studio album by Alan Doyle
- Released: October 13, 2017
- Recorded: 2017
- Genres: Folk, rock
- Length: 41:56
- Labels: Universal Music Canada, Skinner's Hill Music

Alan Doyle chronology
So Let's Go (2015)	A Week at the Warehouse (2017)	Rough Side Out (2020)

A Week at the Warehouse is the third solo album by Alan Doyle. It released on October 13, 2017.

== Track listing ==
No.	Title	Writer(s)	Length
1.	"Come Out with Me"	Alan Doyle, Todd Clark, Donovan Woods	4:12
2.	"Summer Summer Night"	Doyle, Thomas "Tawgs" Salter	3:28
3.	"Fall"	Doyle, Tim Baker, Andrew James O'Brien	4:13
4.	"Now or Never"	Doyle, Clark, Woods	3:56
5.	"Ready to Go"	Doyle, Clark, Woods	3:32
6.	"Somewhere in a Song"	Doyle, Mike Post	3:58
7.	"Bully Boys"	Doyle	3:19
8.	"Forever Light Will Shine"	Paul Hyde	4:23
9.	"Close to the Sun"	Doyle, Clark	3:05
10.	"I'll Be Yours, You'll Be Mine"	Doyle, Woods	3:52
11.	"Beautiful to Me"	Doyle, "Tawgs"	3:58
Total length:			41:56

The song "Bully Boys" was used in a scene in the film Robin Hood (2010), in which Doyle starred as Allan A'Dayle.

== Charts ==
Chart (2017)	Peak position
Canadian Albums (Billboard)	26
