= Lil Bit =

2020 single by Nelly and Florida Georgia Line

Single by Nelly and Florida Georgia Line

from the album Heartland and Life Rolls On (digital-exclusive deluxe edition)
- Released: October 23, 2020
- Genre: Hip hop; country rap
- Length: 3:15
- Label: Records; Columbia; BMLG
- Songwriters: Tyler Hubbard; Blake Redferrin; Cornell Haynes Jr.; Jordan Schmidt
- Producer: Jordan Schmidt

Nelly singles chronology
"Good Times Roll" (2020)	"Lil Bit" (2020)	"High Horse" (2021)

Florida Georgia Line singles chronology
"Drinkin' Beer. Talkin' God. Amen." (2020)	"Lil Bit" (2020)	"Thank You Lord" (2021)

Music video
- "Lil Bit" on YouTube

"Lil Bit" is a song recorded by American hip hop artist Nelly with country duo Florida Georgia Line. It marks the third collaboration between the artists after the remix of the duo's hit single "Cruise" in 2013, and the song "Walk Away" from Nelly's album M.O. in the same year. It is the lead single from Nelly's country-influenced eighth studio album Heartland. Florida Georgia Line released an "FGL Remix" of the track on the digital-exclusive deluxe edition of their fifth studio album Life Rolls On.

== Background ==
"Lil Bit", a hip hop and country rap beat, was co-written by Tyler Hubbard of Florida Georgia Line and Nelly along with country artist Blake Redferrin and producer Jordan Schmidt, during a three-week visit to Nashville by Nelly. He stated the track "merges [his] hip-hop style with [Florida Georgia Line's] country style once again" and he hoped attract fans of both genres to the song. Nelly described his relationship with Florida Georgia Line as "super tight", calling them "family" and said that working with them again was a "no brainer".

== Critical reception ==
Angela Stefano of Taste of Country said the song had a "dance-ready beat" that fits "comfortably within Nelly's catalog". Dylan Bestler of NY Country Swag noted that the track has a "unique sound" that "leans more heavily into rap than country", adding that while it seemed unlikely the song would receive airtime on country radio, it "could be a fun song" in Florida Georgia Line live shows. Chris Parton of Sounds Like Nashville said the track had "classic-rap flow" which is "mixed with self-assured singing", noting the influence of country music in the chorus.

== Live performances ==
Nelly and Tyler Hubbard performed "Lil Bit" on Good Morning America in November 2020. They also performed the song on the nineteenth season finale of NBC's The Voice. Hubbard's bandmate Brian Kelley was unable to join them due to COVID-19 preventive measures after moving into his new home.

== Charts ==
=== Weekly charts ===
Weekly chart performance for "Lil Bit"
Chart (2020–2021)	Peak position
Canada Hot 100 (Billboard)	35
Canada Hot AC (Billboard)	47
Global 200 (Billboard)	76
US Billboard Hot 100	23
US Adult Pop Airplay (Billboard)	20
US Country Airplay (Billboard)	42
US Hot Country Songs (Billboard)	3
US Pop Airplay (Billboard)	16

=== Year-end charts ===
Year-end chart performance for "Lil Bit"
Chart (2021)	Position
Canada (Canadian Hot 100)	100
US Billboard Hot 100	70
US Hot Country Songs (Billboard)	9

== Certifications ==
Certifications for "Lil Bit"
Region	Certification	Certified units/sales
Canada (Music Canada)	4× Platinum	320,000^{‡}
New Zealand (RMNZ)	Gold	15,000^{‡}
United States (RIAA)	4× Platinum	4,000,000^{‡}
^{‡} Sales+streaming figures based on certification alone.
