= Right Round Here (song) =

2023 single by Dean Brody

Single by Dean Brody

from the album Right Round Here
- Released: September 18, 2023
- Genre: Country
- Length: 2:40
- Label: Starseed
- Songwriters: Callum Maudsley; Jenna Walker; Stuart Walker
- Producer: Gavin Slate

Dean Brody singles chronology
"Broke" (2023)	"Right Round Here" (2023)	"Your Mama Would Hate Me" (2024)

Visualizer
- "Right Round Here" on YouTube

"Right Round Here" is a song recorded by Canadian country music artist Dean Brody. The track was written by Stuart Walker and Jenna Walker of the Reklaws with Callum Maudsley, while Gavin Slate produced it. It is the fourth single and title track off Brody's eighth studio album Right Round Here.

== Background ==
"Right Round Here" was written by Brody's labelmates the Reklaws and Callum Maudsley. Brody remarked that he felt a connection to the lyrics upon hearing the song, stating "I recognize how lucky I was to be raised with these values and know I wouldn’t be where I am today without them".

== Critical reception ==
Logan Miller of Front Porch Music positively spoke of the song, stating it "is not just another country song; it’s an anthem that pays tribute to the vast, beautiful land we call Canada". He added that Brody's "personal connection to the lyrics shines through as he reflects on his small-town roots and the values instilled in him by his tight-knit community".

== Live performance ==
On September 16, 2023, Brody performed "Right Round Here" at the 2023 Canadian Country Music Awards in Hamilton, Ontario. His performance opened with the playing of his track "Intro (Northern Anthem)", before Brody and his band began performing "Right Round Here". The show was broadcast live on CTV in Canada, and his performance was later uploaded to YouTube.

== Charts ==
Chart performance for "Right Round Here"
Chart (2023–2024)	Peak position
Canada (Canadian Hot 100)	87
Canada Country (Billboard)	1

== Certifications ==
Certifications for "Right Round Here"
Region	Certification	Certified units/sales
Canada (Music Canada)	Gold	40,000^{‡}
^{‡} Sales+streaming figures based on certification alone.
