= Rough Side Out =

EP by Alan Doyle
- Released: February 14, 2020
- Recorded: 2019
- Label: Warner Music Canada
- Producer: Todd Clark

Alan Doyle chronology
A Week at the Warehouse (2017)	Rough Side Out (2020)

Rough Side Out is an EP by Alan Doyle, released on February 14, 2020. It is his fourth studio release as a solo artist, and his first EP.

== Commercial performance ==
The EP debuted at number two on the Billboard Canadian Albums chart. The lead single, "We Don't Wanna Go Home", a duet with Dean Brody, peaked at number 36 on the Canadian Digital Song Sales chart.

== Track listing ==
Rough Side Out track listing
No.	Title	Writer(s)	Length
1.	"We're Gonna Love Tonight"	Alan Doyle, Donovan Woods	3:06
2.	"We Don't Wanna Go Home" (with Dean Brody)	Doyle, Woods, Todd Clark	3:13
3.	"What the Whisky Won't Do" (with Jess Moskaluke)	Doyle, Clark, Gavin Slate, Travis Wood	3:09
4.	"Anywhere You Wanna Go"	Doyle	3:23
5.	"It's OK"	Doyle, Dave Gunning, Makayla Lynn	3:34
6.	"Paper in Fire"	John Mellencamp	3:33
7.	"I Gotta Go"	Doyle, Lynn, Dave Sampson	3:50

== Charts ==
Sales chart performance for Rough Side Out
Chart (2020)	Peak position
Canadian Albums (Billboard)	2
