= Derek Ryan (singer) =

Irish singer (born 1983)

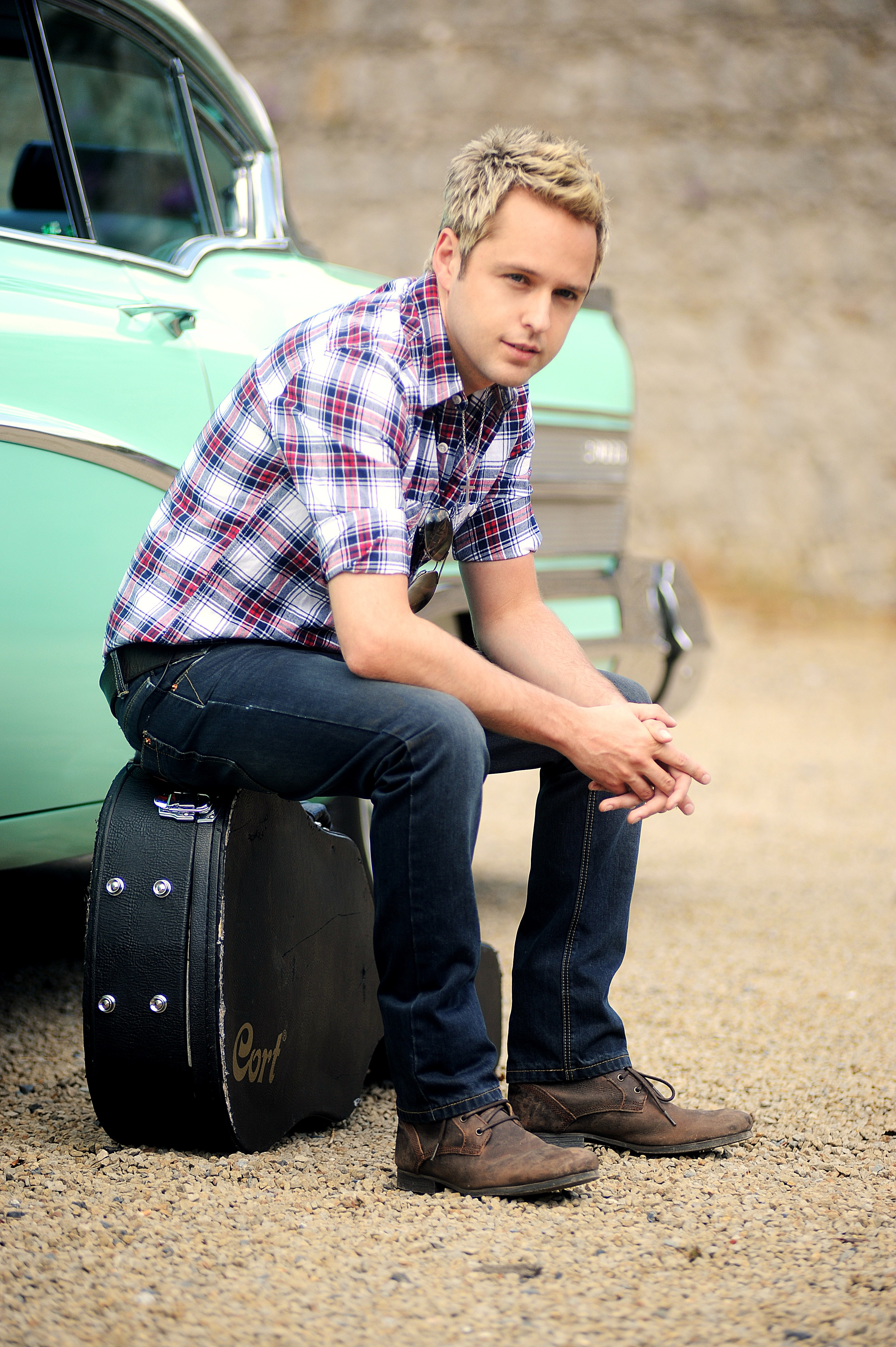

Background information
- Born: 24 August 1983 (age 42); Garryhill, County Carlow, Ireland
- Genres: Country and Irish, pop
- Occupations: Singer
- Instruments: Vocals, guitar
- Years active: 2001–present
- Label: Sharpe Music
- Formerly of: D-Side
- Website: derekryanmusic.com

Derek Ryan (born 24 August 1983 in Garryhill, County Carlow, Ireland) is an Irish singer. He is a former member of the Irish boy band D-Side (2001–2006). He has also established his own production house and label, Ryan Records.

== Beginnings ==
From the age of twelve, Ryan had musical aspirations, performing regularly at social events with his brother Adrian as the Ryan Brothers. Having grown up in Garyhill near Carlow town, Ryan was bred into loving Irish traditional music by his family. His father is a traditional singer of Irish and of country music. Ryan took part in fleadh ceoils and became a winner of two all-Ireland titles in both bodhrán and ceili drumming.

== In D-Side ==
At the age of 17, Ryan joined the boy band D-Side, alongside Shane Creevey, Derek Moran, Damien Bowe and Dane Guiden. D-Side became a trio when Bowe and Guiden both left for personal reasons. The debut single "Stronger Together" was a hit in Ireland. The band had three other top 10 singles in the UK and Ireland, "Speechless", "Invisible" and "Real World". The band was also popular in Japan. It disbanded in 2006 after three studio albums, Stronger Together (2004), Gravity (2005) and Unbroken (2006). They were nominated for several Meteor Awards, "Real World" went multi-platinum in Ireland, and three became top 10 hits in the UK. Live television appearances included Top of the Pops, GMTV and The Late Late Show along with a sell-out theatre tour and number one single in Japan in 2005.

== Solo career ==
Ryan turned solo since 2006 and changed his genre of music from pop to a singer of country and Irish, performing both his own compositions and traditional songs.

After the demise of D-side, he spent a few years gigging on the London scene, returning to Ireland in 2009. Having studied accounting for two years, he also started writing his first songs. Following many competition victories including "A Song for Carlow" and the "International Song of Peace" and album cuts for various artists in Ireland and abroad, he was offered a publishing deal with the well regarded DWB music in Surrey, UK. He collaborated with writers in Britain and Nashville, Tennessee. His writing ability was seen in his debut hit "God's Plan" that received considerable airplay and used in Irish dance halls and in sell-out concerts in England and Scotland. It has since been recorded by Daniel O'Donnell. Ryan formed a five-piece band and released five albums. His debut album was A Mother's Son followed by Made of Gold, Dreamers and Believers and Country Soul, the latter making it to the Top 10 of Irish albums chart in October 2013. His 2014 album The Simple Things and 2015 album One Good Night both made it to number 1 in Irish albums chart. Popular songs by Ryan include "It's Friday", "Welcome Home (The Gathering)", "100 Numbers" and "Hold on to Your Hat". In 2016, he embarked on the This Is Me tour and is due to release two albums almost simultaneously. This Is Me (full title This Is Me: The Nashville Songbook) was released on 14 October 2016, followed by Happy Man on 21 October 2016.

== Ryan Records ==
Ryan established his production house and record label, Ryan Records. The Irish country artist Ben Troy was the first artist to be signed on the label. On March 24, 2017, Ryan Records released Troy's debut album, Gravity.

== Discography ==
=== Albums ===
==== As part of D-Side ====
(For a full listing and peak positions, see D-Side discography)

- 2004: Stronger Together
- 2005: Gravity
- 2006: Unbroken

==== Solo studio albums ====
Year	Album	Peak positions	Track list
Year	Album	IRE	Track list
2010	A Mother's Son		No. / Title / Length; 1. / "The Belle of Liverpool" / 2:29; 2. / "A Mother's Son" / 3:00; 3. / "There Stands the Glass" / 2:23; 4. / "Angel of the Night" / 3:11; 5. / "God's Plan" / 3:41; 6. / "Run to the Door" / 2:14; 7. / "I Buy Her Roses" / 3:50; 8. / "Ain't Love A Lot Like That" / 2:14; 9. / "Fly" / 3:42; 10. / "I Saw the Light" / 2:34; 11. / "The Red, Yellow and Green" / 3:49; 12. / "Broken-hearted Road" / 2:40
2011	Made of Gold		No. / Title / Length; 1. / "Kiss Me Mary" / 3:13; 2. / "Just a Little Love" / 3:20; 3. / "Blue" / 2:28; 4. / "Sparkle" / 3:14; 5. / "Home from the Sea" / 4:02; 6. / "It's a Little Too Late" / 2:37; 7. / "It's a Heartache" / 3:16; 8. / "Early in the Morning" / 2:27; 9. / "I'll Settle for Old Ireland" / 2:37; 10. / "Silver Wings" / 3:40; 11. / "Nothing Hurts Like a Heartache" / 2:40; 12. / "You Waltzed Yourself (Right Into My Life)" / 3:58; 13. / "The Old Account" / 2:40; 14. / "Irish Heart" / 4:38
2012	Dreamers & Believers	94	No. / Title / Length; 1. / "It's Friday" / 3:10; 2. / "Dreamers and Believers" / 4:11; 3. / "Galway to Graceland" / 3:51; 4. / "I Got My Baby Back" / 3:04; 5. / "Write Me a Letter" / 3:48; 6. / "I'm Gonna Get You" / 2:33; 7. / "It's a Heartache" / 3:35; 8. / "Love's Gonna Live Here" / 2:45; 9. / "Life Is a River" / 4:27; 10. / "Dance With Me Tonight" / 2:57; 11. / "I Can't Stop Loving You" / 3:56; 12. / "Perfect Days" / 2:41; 13. / "The Song of Donegal" / 3:13; 14. / "Big Big Love" / 2:33; 15. / "I Won't Let Go" / 3:46
2013	Country Soul	10	No. / Title / Length; 1. / "Country Soul" / 3:24; 2. / "100 Numbers" / 2:51; 3. / "Dancing in the Moonlight" / 3:14; 4. / "Leave a Light on For Me" / 3:16; 5. / "Better Times a Comin" / 2:42; 6. / "To Be a Man" / 3:25; 7. / "Wake Me Up" / 3:25; 8. / "Welcome Home (The Gathering)" / 4:15; 9. / "I Don't Want to Miss a Thing" / 4:03; 10. / "Love Me Tonight (Turn Out the Lights)" / 2:43; 11. / "The Long Way Home" / 3:05; 12. / "Turn Me Loose" / 3:17; 13. / "Raggle-Taggle Gypsy" / 2:58; 14. / "If I Should Fall Behind" / 4:51
2014	The Simple Things	1	No. / Title / Length; 1. / "Hold On to Your Hat (feat. Sharon Shannon)" / 3:03; 2. / "What Dancin's For" / 3:40; 3. / "The Simple Things" / 3:25; 4. / "I Fought the Law" / 2:52; 5. / "Flowers In Your Hair" / 3:05; 6. / "Waitin On A Sunny Day" / 4:25; 7. / "The House That Jack Built" / 2:41; 8. / "Cry" / 3:47; 9. / "The Ferryman" / 3:08; 10. / "Lightning Bolt" / 2:26; 11. / "Walking After Midnight" / 3:03; 12. / "Busking Balladeer" / 3:16; 13. / "Desperado" / 3:32; 14. / "Pick a Bale of Cotton" / 2:47; 15. / "Will Ye Go Oh Lassie Go" / 4:11
2015	One Good Night	1	No. / Title / Length; 1. / "One Good Night" / 3:59; 2. / "Bendigo" / 3:19; 3. / "Cecilia" / 3:01; 4. / "The First Cut Is the Deepest" / 3:46; 5. / "Firefly" / 3:02; 6. / "The Wrong Side of Sober (feat Roly Daniels)" / 2:56; 7. / "Waltzing With a Hero" / 4:18; 8. / "Fine Line" / 3:29; 9. / "Patsy Fagan" / 3:01; 10. / "Memories of Us" / 4:04; 11. / "Someday You'll Love Me" / 3:31; 12. / "Oh What A World" / 3:54; 13. / "Diamond Rings and Old Bar Stools (feat. Donna Taggart)" / 3:18; 14. / "Break Your Heart" / 3:20; 15. / "Shut Up and Dance" / 3:08
2016	This Is Me (The Nashville Songbook)	8	No. / Title / Length; 1. / "This Is Me" / 3:31; 2. / "Tender" / 3:15; 3. / "More to Good Lovin'" / 2:59; 4. / "Brand New Day" / 3:21; 5. / "Better Than Being Alone" / 3:56; 6. / "Some Days" / 3:42; 7. / "Switch" / 3:51; 8. / "100 Numbers" / 2:48; 9. / "Fine Line" / 3:51; 10. / "Connemara Sky" / 3:30; 11. / "God's Plan (2016)" / 3:39
2016	Happy Man	7	No. / Title / Length; 1. / "Happy Many" / 3:11; 2. / "City of Chicago" / 3:57; 3. / "Old and Grey" / 2:57; 4. / "Won't Ya Come Down (To Yarmouth Town)" / 3:22; 5. / "Sixty Years Ago" / 4:00; 6. / "You're Only Young Once" / 2:37; 7. / "Stay All Night" / 3:03; 8. / "On to the Whiskey I Go" / 3:03; 9. / "Sax, Drums & Rock'n'Roll" / 2:34; 10. / "Carry Me Home" / 4:01; 11. / "You Belong to Me" / 2:31; 12. / "Jersey Girl" / 6:25; 13. / "People Are Crazy" / 3:48; 14. / "When You Love Someone" / 3:41
2017	The Fire	13	No. / Title / Length; 1. / "Heaven Tonight (feat. Goitse)" / 3:06; 2. / "Clap Both My Hands" / 2:50; 3. / "Pretty Little Lonely Eyes" / 3:56; 4. / "The Fox" / 2:50; 5. / "Full House. Empty Heart" / 2:47; 6. / "My Father's House (feat. Adrian Ryan)" / 3:21; 7. / "Down On Your Uppers" / 3:43; 8. / "Homeland" / 3:34; 9. / "Adalaida" / 3:10; 10. / "Sweet Forget Me Not" / 4:18; 11. / "This Ain't Love" / 4:01; 12. / "Where Do You Run" / 3:24; 13. / "The Fire" / 3:24; 14. / "Friends With Tractors" (Deluxe edition only) / 3:24; 15. / "Promises" (Deluxe edition only) / 3:42; 16. / "Coconut Tree" (Deluxe edition only) / 3:32; 17. / "Rose of Tralee Medley" (Deluxe edition only) / 3:41
2018	Ten	54	No. / Title / Length; 1. / "Ya Can't Stay Here" / 3:21; 2. / "Hayley Jo" / 2:55; 3. / "Little More Time For Drinkin'" / 3:01; 4. / "Here I Stand" / 4:54; 5. / "Where You Are" / 3:49; 6. / "Honey Honey (feat. Lisa McHugh)" / 3:12; 7. / "I Do" / 3:29; 8. / "Oh Me Oh My Oh" / 3:03; 9. / "Small Town Summer" / 4:07; 10. / "To Waltz With My Mother Again" / 3:30; 11. / "Off the Beaten Track" / 2:54; 12. / "The Door" / 4:48
2020	The Road to Christmas	42	No. / Title / Length; 1. / "The Road to Christmas"; 2. / "Jingle Bell Rock"; 3. / "White Christmas"; 4. / "Winter Wonderland"; 5. / "O Holy Night"; 6. / "Two Steps 'Round the Christmas Tree"; 7. / "Belleau Wood"; 8. / "Blue Christmas"; 9. / "Let It Snow! Let It Snow! Let It Snow!"; 10. / "Last Christmas"
2021	Soft Ground	10	
2022	Pure & Simple	42	No. / Title / Length; 1. / "The Cows on the Hill" / 2:51; 2. / "The Craic is Only Startin'" / 2:35; 3. / "Colcannon" / 2:29; 4. / "Pure & Simple" / 2:36; 5. / "Great Granny Kane" / 3:35; 6. / "Everywhere With You" / 2:50; 7. / "Golden" / 3:32; 8. / "Rollin' On" / 3:21; 9. / "Mingulay Boat Song" / 4:51; 10. / "Heard It Before Joe" / 3:48; 11. / "All Die Equal" / 2:47
2024	Long Shot Love	16	

==== Live albums ====
Year
Album
Peak positions
Track list
IRE
Irish
Albums
Chart
2014
The Entertainer – Live
5

No.	Title	Length
1.	"The Belle of Liverpool"	2:21
2.	"Love's Gonna Live Here"	2:34
3.	"It's Friday"	3:06
4.	"Made of Gold"	2:54
5.	"I'm Gonna Get You"	2:21
6.	"Dreamers and Believers"	4:15
7.	"God's Plan"	3:04
8.	"Vince Gill Medley"	3:34
9.	"Irish Medley"	3:15
10.	"Always on My Mind"	3:25
11.	"Kiss Me Mary"	3:10
12.	"Old Time Rock N Roll"	4:06
13.	"Heaven"	4:17
14.	"Pogues Medley"	3:00
15.	"The Best Part of the Day"	2:44
16.	"Life Is a River"	4:33
17.	"Elvis Presley Medley"	3:30
18.	"I Saw the Light"	2:28
19.	"American Rock Medley"	4:03
20.	"Hey Jude"	3:07
21.	"100 Numbers"	2:56
22.	"Wake Me Up"	3:57

=== DVDs ===
- 2014: The Entertainer – Live

=== Singles ===
==== as part of D-Side ====
(Selective; for a full listing and peak positions, see D-Side discography)

- 2002: "Stronger Together"
- 2003: "Speechless"
- 2003: "Invisible"
- 2004: "Real World"
- 2004: "Pushin' Me Out"

==== Solo ====
Year	Single	Peak positions	Album
Year	Single	IRE	Album
2006	"The Red, Yellow and Green"	20	The Mother's Son
2010	"God's Plan"	–	The Mother's Son
2012	"It's Friday"	–	Dreamers and Believers
2013	"100 Numbers"	–	Country Soul
2013	"Wake Me Up"	84	Country Soul
2014	"Hold on to Your Hat" (feat. Sharon Shannon)	42	The Simple Things

==== Other singles / videos ====
- 2010: "Belle of Liverpool
- 2012: "Life Is a River"
- 2012: "Write Me a Letter"
- 2012: "Kiss Me Mary"
- 2013: "Better Days Are Coming"
- 2014: "Raggle Taggle Gypsy"
- 2014: "Pick a Bale of Cotton"
- 2015: "Cecilia"
- 2015: "I Fought the Law"
- 2015: "Shut Up and Dance"
- 2015: "Bendigo"
- 2015: "Break Your Heart"
- 2015: "Waltz With a Hero"
- 2016: "Wrong Side of Sober" (feat. Roly Daniels)
- 2016: "Firefly"
- 2016: "Won't Ya Come Down (To Yarmouth Town)"
- 2016: "You're Only Young Once"
- 2017: "This Is Me"
- 2017: "Sixty Years Ago"
- 2018: "Honey, Honey" (with Lisa McHugh)
- 2018: "Down On Your Uppers"
- 2018: "Hayley Jo"
- 2018: "Ya Can't Stay Here"
- 2019: "Only Getting Started" (with Cliona Hagan)
- 2020: "On the Sesh" (feat. the Tumbling Paddies)
- 2020: "It Won't Rain Forever" (with Philomena Begley)
- 2020: "Wherever You're Going"
- 2020: "The Road to Christmas"
- 2021: "The Road"
- 2021: "The Night that Went On for Days"
