= Right Round Here =

2023 studio album by Dean Brody

Studio album by Dean Brody
- Released: September 15, 2023
- Venue: Nashville, Tennessee / Kelowna, British Columbia
- Genre: Country
- Length: 26:42
- Label: Starseed
- Producer: Todd Clark; Gavin Slate

Dean Brody chronology
Boys (2020)	Right Round Here (2023)

Singles from Right Round Here
- 1. "Where'd You Learn How to Do That" Released: May 13, 2022; 2. "You Got the Wrong Guy" Released: September 30, 2022; 3. "Broke" Released: April 14, 2023; 4. "Right Round Here" Released: September 18, 2023

Right Round Here is the eighth studio album by Canadian country music artist Dean Brody. The album was produced by Todd Clark and Gavin Slate, and was released via Starseed Records on September 15, 2023. It includes the singles "Where'd You Learn How to Do That", "You Got the Wrong Guy", "Broke", and the title track "Right Round Here". Brody embarked on the acoustic "Right Round Here Tour" in support of the album in the fall of 2023.

== Background and promotion ==
Brody described Right Round Here as an ode to Canada, "the country that raised and shaped me". In reference to having lived in several different provinces, including British Columbia, Alberta, Ontario, and Nova Scotia, Brody stated "from coast to coast, this nation has been both my muse and home," and that calling the album a "love letter" to the country would be an understatement. In somewhat of a departure from his previous work, Brody only wrote two songs on the album: "Intro (Northern Anthem)" and "Trouble". He noted that the COVID-19 pandemic greatly affected his songwriting routine, and thus, he was only able to write four songs in two and a half years. His friends and labelmates Stuart Walker and Jenna Walker of the sibling duo the Reklaws co-wrote three songs on the album, including the title track. Brody noted a personal connection to the lyrics of the title track, which he says made him recognize he was "lucky to be raised with these values" stemming from growing up in a small town.

The album was announced concurrently with the announcement of "Right Round Here Tour" and the release of the promotional single "Paint the Town Redneck" in May 2023. One day after the album's release, Brody performed the opening two tracks "Intro (Northern Anthem)" and "Right Round Here" at the 2023 Canadian Country Music Awards in Hamilton, Ontario. The show was broadcast live on CTV in Canada, and his performance was later uploaded to YouTube.

== Critical reception ==
Logan Miller of Front Porch Music favourably reviewed Right Round Here, describing it as "a delightful mix of songs that paint a vivid picture of Canadian life and culture". He added that "the album showcases Brody’s versatility as an artist, with each song telling a unique story and highlighting his songwriting skills".

== Track listing ==
No.	Title	Writer(s)	Length
1.	"Intro (Northern Anthem)"	Dean Brody	1:10
2.	"Right Round Here"	Callum Maudsley; Jenna Walker; Stuart Walker	2:39
3.	"Where'd You Learn How to Do That"	J. Walker; S. Walker; Thomas Salter; Blake Redferrin	2:54
4.	"Lost Cause"	James Barker; Rodney Clawson; Mark Holman; Justin Wilson	3:37
5.	"Then There's You"	J. Walker; S. Walker; Gavin Slate; Travis Wood	3:23
6.	"Trouble"	Brody	3:33
7.	"You Got the Wrong Guy"	Wood; Jesse Lee; Jason Massey	3:34
8.	"Broke"	Barker; Michael Hardy	3:00
9.	"Paint the Town Redneck"	Jordan Minton; Griffen Palmer; Lily Rose; Mark Trussel	2:48
Total length:			26:42

== Charts ==
=== Singles ===
Chart performance for singles from Right Round Here
Year	Single	Peak positions		Certifications
Year	Single	CAN Country	CAN	Certifications
2022	"Where'd You Learn How to Do That"	1	62	MC: Platinum
2022	"You Got the Wrong Guy"	4	98	MC: Gold
2023	"Broke"	37	—	
2023	"Right Round Here"	1	87	MC: Gold
"—" denotes releases that did not chart

== Awards and nominations ==
Year	Association	Category	Nominated work	Result	Ref.
2023	CCMA	Single of the Year	"Where'd You Learn How to Do That"	Nominated	
2024	Juno Awards	Country Album of the Year	Right Round Here	Nominated	
2024	CCMA	Innovative Campaign of the Year	Right Round Here Album Setup & Release Campaign, "Right Round Here Tour"	Nominated	

== Release history ==
Release formats for Right Round Here
Country	Date	Format	Label	Ref.
Various	September 15, 2023	Digital download	Starseed Records	
Various	September 15, 2023	Streaming	Starseed Records	
