= So Let's Go =

Studio album by Alan Doyle
- Released: January 20, 2015
- Recorded: 2014
- Genres: Folk, rock
- Length: 33:15
- Labels: Universal Music Canada, Skinner's Hill Music Ltd.

Alan Doyle chronology
Boy on Bridge (2012)	So Let's Go (2015)	A Week at the Warehouse (2017)

So Let's Go is the second solo album by Alan Doyle, released on January 20, 2015.

== Track listing ==
No.	Title	Writer(s)	Length
1.	"So Let's Go"	Alan Doyle, Thomas "Tawgs" Salter	3:21
2.	"I Can't Dance Without You"	Doyle, Todd Clark, Donovan Woods	3:40
3.	"The Night Loves Us"	Doyle, Clark, Woods	3:16
4.	"Laying Down to Perish"	Doyle	3:14
5.	"My Kingdom"	Doyle, Jerrod Bettis, Clark	3:14
6.	"1,2,3,4"	Doyle, Ed Robertson	3:03
7.	"Stay"	Doyle, Scott Grimes	4:14
8.	"Sins of Saturday Night"	Doyle, Gordie Sampson	3:14
9.	"Shine On"	Doyle, Bettis	3:02
10.	"Take Us Home"	Doyle, "Tawgs"	3:23
Total length:			33:15

== Chart performance ==
Chart (2012)	Peak position
Canadian Albums Chart	13

== Singles ==
The lead single off the album, "So Let's Go", was released November 6, 2014, by Universal Music Canada in Canada and Skinner's Hill Music Ltd. in the United States.
