= A Whale for the Killing =

- Genre: Drama
- Based on: A Whale for the Killing by Farley Mowat
- Written by: Lionel Chetwynd
- Directed by: Richard T. Heffron
- Starring: Peter Strauss; Dee Wallace; Kathryn Walker; Richard Widmark; Bruce McGill
- Theme music composer: Basil Poledouris
- Country of origin: United States

Production
- Executive producers: Hugh M. Hefner; Edward L. Rissien
- Producers: Robert Lovenheim; Peter Strauss
- Production locations: Petty Harbour, Newfoundland, Newfoundland and Labrador, Canada; Bay Area, San Francisco, California
- Cinematography: Edmond L. Koons
- Editors: Michael Eliot; Robert Florio
- Running time: 145 min.
- Production companies: Beowulf Productions; Playboy Productions

Original release
- Network: ABC
- Release: February 1, 1981

A Whale for the Killing is an American television film that aired on ABC on February 1, 1981. It is loosely based on a true story by environmentalist Farley Mowat, about a whale that is tortured by a fisherman. The incident happened near Burgeo, Newfoundland, while Mowat & family lived there.

The film, based on Mowat's 1972 book of the same name, received two Primetime Emmy nominations.

The Canadian singer Alan Doyle starred as a boy on a bridge in the movie. In 2012 he released his solo album Boy on Bridge which paid tribute to the role.

== Soundtrack ==
The soundtrack is available on CD from BSX Records. The score was composed by Basil Poledouris. Also included on the same CD is the soundtrack to the 1992 theatrical film Wind, also composed by Poledouris.
