= Boys (Dean Brody album) =

Studio album by Dean Brody
- Released: November 18, 2020
- Genre: Country
- Length: 24:37
- Labels: Scurvy Dog; Starseed
- Producers: Todd Clark (tracks 1–5); Matt Rovey (tracks 6–8)

Dean Brody chronology
Black Sheep (2019)	Boys (2020)	Right Round Here (2023)

Singles from Boys
- 1. "Can't Help Myself" Released: February 14, 2020; 2. "Canadian Summer" Released: June 24, 2020; 3. "Boys" Released: November 18, 2020; 4. "Lightning Bug" Released: April 28, 2021; 5. "I'd Go to Jail" Released: October 7, 2021

Boys is the seventh studio album by Canadian country artist Dean Brody. It was released on November 18, 2020, through his independent label Scurvy Dog Music.

== Singles ==
"Can't Help Myself" was released as the debut single in February 2020. The song is a collaboration with Canadian country duo the Reklaws, and peaked at #1 on the Billboard Canada Country chart. It set a record for the most-spun song in a single week on Canadian country radio with 1782 spins. It peaked at #49 on the Canadian Hot 100.

"Canadian Summer" was released as the second single to radio in June 2020. It peaked at #1 on the Canada Country chart, and set the new record as the most-spun song in a single-week on Canadian country radio with 1817 spins. It also reached a peak of #56 on the Canadian Hot 100.

"Boys" was released as the third single from the album in November 2020, and features American country singer Mickey Guyton. It peaked at #1 on Canadian country radio for the week of April 3, 2021, and also peaked at #65 on the Canadian Hot 100 that week.

"Lightning Bug" was released to country radio as the fourth single from the album on April 28, 2021, and later peaked at number seven on Canada Country and number 78 on the Canadian Hot 100.

"I'd Go to Jail" was released as the fifth single from the album in October 2021. It peaked at number five on the Canada Country chart and number 73 on the Canadian Hot 100.

== Track listing ==
No.	Title	Writer(s)	Length
1.	"Boys" (featuring Mickey Guyton)	Emily Reid; Matt McVaney; Travis Wood	3:15
2.	"Lightning Bug"	Dean Brody	2:47
3.	"Can't Help Myself" (with the Reklaws)	Tyler Hubbard; Brian Kelley; Blake Redferrin; Jason Afable; Rocky Block	2:38
4.	"I'd Go to Jail"	Brody	3:02
5.	"Stay Up"	Brody; Donovan Woods	3:11
6.	"Canadian Summer"	Brody	3:24
7.	"Bucket List"	Brody	3:07
8.	"Always You"	Brody	3:11

== Charts ==
=== Singles ===
Year	Single	Peak chart positions		Certifications
Year	Single	CAN Country	CAN	Certifications
2020	"Can't Help Myself" (with the Reklaws)	1	49	MC: 2× Platinum
2020	"Canadian Summer"	1	56	MC: Platinum
2020	"Boys" (featuring Mickey Guyton)	1	65	MC: Gold
2021	"Lightning Bug"	7	78	MC: Gold
2021	"I'd Go to Jail"	5	73	MC: Gold
"—" denotes releases that did not chart

=== Promotional singles ===
Year	Single	Peak chart positions
Year	Single	CAN Digital
2020	"Bucket List"	41

== Certifications ==
Region	Certification	Certified units/sales
Canada (Music Canada)	Gold	40,000^{‡}
^{‡} Sales+streaming figures based on certification alone.

== Awards and nominations ==
Year	Association	Category	Nominated work	Result	Ref.
2022	Juno Awards	Country Album of the Year	Boys	Nominated	
