= It's Friday =

2012 single by Dean Brody

Single by Dean Brody

from the album Dirt
- Released: September 7, 2012
- Genre: Country
- Length: 3:11
- Label: Open Road
- Songwriter: Dean Brody
- Producer: Matt Rovey

Dean Brody singles chronology
"Bob Marley" (2012)	"It's Friday" (2012)	"Underneath the Apple Trees" (2013)

Music video
- "It's Friday" on YouTube

"It's Friday"

Single by Derek Ryan

from the album Dreamers and Believers
- Released: March 8, 2012
- Genre: Country and Irish
- Length: 3:09
- Label: Sharpe Music
- Songwriter: Dean Brody

Derek Ryan singles chronology
"It's Friday" (2012)	"100 Numbers" (2013)

Music video
- "It's Friday" on YouTube

"It's Friday" is a song written and recorded by Canadian country music artist Dean Brody. It was released in September 2012 as the third single from his album Dirt. The song reached number 60 on the Canadian Hot 100 in November 2012. The song features an uncredited performance from Canadian folk-rock group Great Big Sea. The released music video though clearly featured Great Big Sea performing with Brody.

== Music video ==
The music video was directed by Jeth Weinrich and premiered in September 2012. It features the Canadian band Great Big Sea on the video.

== Covers ==
The song was covered by Derek Ryan in the style of Country and Irish accompanied by a music video. The single was released independently on Sharpe Music.

== Chart performance ==
"It's Friday" debuted at number 83 on the Canadian Hot 100 for the week of October 13, 2012 and peaked at number 60 the week of November 24, 2012.

Chart (2012)	Peak position
Canada Hot 100 (Billboard)	60
Canada Country (Billboard)	7

== Certifications ==
Region	Certification
Canada (Music Canada)	Platinum
