= Bob Marley (song) =

Single by Dean Brody

from the album Dirt
- Released: May 21, 2012
- Genre: Country
- Length: 3:27
- Label: Open Road
- Songwriter: Dean Brody
- Producer: Matt Rovey

Dean Brody singles chronology
"Canadian Girls" (2011)	"Bob Marley" (2012)	"It's Friday" (2012)

"Bob Marley" is a song written and recorded by Canadian country music artist Dean Brody. It was released in May 2012 as the second single from his album Dirt. The song reached No. 69 on the Canadian Hot 100 in July 2012.

== Content ==
The narrator consoles himself and his grandmother to the music of Bob Marley.

== Music video ==
The music video was directed by Stephano Barberis and premiered in May 2012.

== Chart performance ==
"Bob Marley" debuted at number 94 on the Canadian Hot 100 for the week of June 30, 2012.

Chart (2012)	Peak position
Canada Hot 100 (Billboard)	69
Canada Country (Billboard)	3
