= I'd Go to Jail =

2021 single by Dean Brody

Single by Dean Brody

from the album Boys
- Released: October 7, 2021
- Genre: Country
- Length: 3:02
- Label: Scurvy Dog; Starseed
- Songwriter(s): Dean Brody
- Producer(s): Todd Clark

Dean Brody singles chronology
"More Drinkin' Than Fishin'" (2021)	"I'd Go to Jail" (2021)	"Where'd You Learn How to Do That" (2022)

Music video
- "I'd Go to Jail" on YouTube

"I'd Go to Jail" is a song written and recorded by Canadian country artist Dean Brody. The song was released to radio in October 2021, as the fifth single from Brody's seventh studio album Boys.

== Background ==
Brody described "I'd Go to Jail" as a "personal favourite". Inspired by being a father, he wrote the track by himself and stated: "Anyone who has someone in their life that they love can relate to doing anything to protect them and that’s really what this song is about". He added that this was one of two songs he had written—the other being his 2016 hit "Time"—where he felt "goosebumps" as he knew that it was "special".

== Critical reception ==
Jason Schneider of FYI Music News referred to the song as an "emotion-fueled track", adding that it "displays Brody's passion for storytelling while capturing the unparalleled beauty of a father-daughter relationship". Courtney Fielder of Country100.7 referred to the track as "a beautiful tune".

== Commercial performance ==
"I'd Go to Jail" peaked at number 73 on the Canadian Hot 100 for the week of March 19, 2022, spending eight weeks on the chart in total. It also reached a peak of number five on the Billboard Canada Country chart for the same week, marking Brody's thirty-first career top ten hit. The song has been certified Gold by Music Canada.

== Charts ==
Chart performance for "I'd Go to Jail"
Chart (2022)	Peak position
Canada (Canadian Hot 100)	73
Canada Country (Billboard)	5

== Certifications ==
Region	Certification	Certified units/sales
Canada (Music Canada)	Gold	40,000^{‡}
^{‡} Sales+streaming figures based on certification alone.
