= Gypsy Road (album) =

Studio album by Dean Brody
- Released: April 21, 2015
- Genre: Country
- Length: 37:44; 50:00 (Deluxe Edition)
- Label: Open Road
- Producer: Matt Rovey

Dean Brody chronology
Crop Circles (2013)	Gypsy Road (2015)	Beautiful Freakshow (2016)

Singles from Gypsy Road
- 1. "Upside Down" Released: February 9, 2015; 2. "Bring Down the House" Released: May 25, 2015; 3. "Love Would Be Enough" Released: October 23, 2015; 4. "Monterey" Released: March 18, 2016

Professional ratings
Review scores
Source	Rating
The Vancouver Sun	4.5/5 stars
Winnipeg Free Press	4/5 stars

Gypsy Road is the fifth studio album by Canadian country music artist Dean Brody. It was released on April 21, 2015, via Open Road Recordings. The first single, "Upside Down", was released on February 9. The album's second single, "Bring Down the House", was released to Canadian country radio on May 25, 2015. The album's third single, "Love Would Be Enough", was released to Canadian country radio on October 23, 2015. The album's fourth single, "Monterey", was released to Canadian country radio on March 18, 2016.

== Content ==
Two of the album's songs were previously recorded by other artists: "Hillbilly" by Billy Currington on his second studio album, Doin' Somethin' Right, and "As Country as She Gets" by Joe Nichols for his 2005 album, III.

== Critical reception ==
Francois Marchand of The Vancouver Sun gave the album four and a half stars out of five, writing that "Gypsy Road is one of the finest Canadian country albums released in recent years, and even if country ain’t really your thang, you should get a kick out of this one." Bruce Leperre of the Winnipeg Free Press gave the album four stars out of five, calling it Brody's "most satisfying offering yet."

== Track listing ==
No.	Title	Writer(s)	Length
1.	"Upside Down"	Dean Brody	4:05
2.	"Hillbilly"	Brett Jones	4:06
3.	"Monterey"	Brody	3:45
4.	"Bring Down the House"	Brody	3:28
5.	"Sweet Lola"	Brody	3:47
6.	"Love Would Be Enough"	Brody	2:54
7.	"Footprints of a Giant"	Brody	4:44
8.	"Castaways"	Brody	3:52
9.	"Everything's Better"	Clay Mills; Billy Montana	3:42
10.	"Like I Know This Town"	Jaron Boyer; Jamie Moore; Chris Wallin	3:21
Total length:			37:44

Deluxe Edition bonus tracks
No.	Title	Writer(s)	Length
11.	"As Country as She Gets"	Jim Collins; Tony Martin; Wendell Mobley	3:40
12.	"Old Friend" (demo)	Brody	3:57
13.	"Trail in Life" (acoustic)	Brody	4:39
Total length:			50:00

== Chart performance ==
In its debut week, the album peaked at number seven on the Canadian Albums Chart, selling 2,700 copies.

=== Album ===
Chart (2015)	Peak position
Canadian Albums (Billboard)	7

=== Singles ===
Year	Single	Peak chart positions	
Year	Single	CAN Country	CAN
2015	"Upside Down"	5	80
2015	"Bring Down the House"	7	43
2015	"Love Would Be Enough"	4	100
2016	"Monterey"	7	—
"—" denotes releases that did not chart
