= Roll That Barrel Out =

Single by Dean Brody

from the album Trail in Life
- Released: July 5, 2010
- Genre: Country
- Length: 3:15
- Label: Open Road
- Songwriter: Dean Brody
- Producer: Matt Rovey

Dean Brody singles chronology
"Wildflower" (2009)	"Roll That Barrel Out" (2010)	"Trail in Life" (2010)

"Roll That Barrel Out" is a song written and recorded by Canadian country music artist Dean Brody. It was released in July 2010 as the second single to his 2010 album Trail in Life. The song reached number 69 on the Canadian Hot 100 and was his highest-peaking single until "Canadian Girls" (number 36) in 2012.

== Content ==
"Roll That Barrel Out" is a song about a Jamaican man who enjoyed his life so much that he shared his joy for life with everyone around him.

== Reception ==
Roughstock critic Matt Bjorke described it as the "kind of song that Kenny Chesney and Billy Currington have recorded over the years" but "the song doesn’t turn into a caricature of ‘beachy’ songs as there isn't a steel drum to be found on the track."

== Music video ==
The music video was directed by Jeth Weinrich.

== Chart positions ==
Chart (2010)	Peak position
Canada Hot 100 (Billboard)	69
Canada Country (Billboard)	5
