= Monterey (Dean Brody song) =

Single by Dean Brody

from the album Gypsy Road
- Released: March 18, 2016
- Genre: Country
- Length: 3:45
- Label: Open Road
- Songwriter(s): Dean Brody
- Producer(s): Matt Rovey

Dean Brody singles chronology
"Love Would Be Enough" (2015)	"Monterey" (2016)	"Bush Party" (2016)

"Monterey" is the fourth single from Canadian country singer Dean Brody's album Gypsy Road. The song was released to radio in March 2016.

== Background ==
Prior to the single's official release, "Monterey" was released before the album's release to iTunes as a promotional single.

== Chart performance ==
Chart (2016)	Peak position
Canada Country (Billboard)	7
