= Bring Down the House =

Single by Dean Brody

from the album Gypsy Road
- Released: May 25, 2015
- Genre: Country pop
- Length: 3:28
- Label: Open Road
- Songwriter(s): Dean Brody
- Producer(s): Matt Rovey

Dean Brody singles chronology
"Upside Down" (2015)	"Bring Down the House" (2015)	"Love Would Be Enough" (2015)

"Bring Down the House" is a song written and recorded by Canadian country music artist Dean Brody for his fifth studio album, Gypsy Road (2015). It was released to Canadian country radio on May 25, 2015 through Open Road Recordings as the album's second single. A pop-influenced remix was released to digital retailers on December 4, 2015.

Following its release as a single, "Bring Down the House" has become one of Brody's most commercially successful released to date. It reached a peak of 43 on the Billboard Canadian Hot 100 and has been certified double platinum by Music Canada. The song also reached a peak of No. 7 on the Canada Country airplay chart.

== Background ==
"Bring Down the House" is a country pop song that blends elements of contemporary country music (such as a prominent banjo) with influences of pop, rock and roll, and electronic dance music. Brody told The Chronicle Herald that the song "is definitely in some territory where [he] didn't know how people would accept it," and that it was originally slated as a bonus track on the album. However, he chose to include it on the standard track listing and later release it as a single due to positive fan reception.

== Reception ==
=== Accolades ===
At the 2016 Canadian Country Music Awards, "Bring Down the House" won Single of the Year and CMT Video of the Year. Brody also won the Songwriter of the Year award for his work on the song. It was Brody's second consecutive win the Video of the Year category, after "Upside Down" won in 2015. SOCAN honoured Brody with a SOCAN No. 1 Song Award for "Bring Down the House" reaching the top of the CMT Chevy Top 20 video countdown.

=== Commercial ===
"Bring Down the House" entered the Canadian Hot 100 at number 98 on the chart dated June 27, 2015. The song reached its peak position of 43 in its sixth week, on the chart dated August 1, 2015. Remaining in the top 50 for six weeks, it rebounded to this peak two more times, on the charts dated August 15, 2015 and September 12, 2015. According to FYI Music News, "Bring Down the House" was the best-selling country song in Canada for 27 consecutive weeks following its release. The single was certified Gold by Music Canada in August 2015, and reached Platinum status on November 11, 2015, and Double Platinum on August 24, 2017, indicating sales of over 160,000 digital copies.

On the Canada Country chart, "Bring Down the House" debuted in June 2015. It reached a peak position of 7 in its fifteenth week on the chart dated September 26, 2015, becoming Brody's sixth top-10 since Billboard began formally publishing the chart in 2012. The song spent 20 total weeks on the chart before going recurrent.

== Music video ==
The official music video for "Bring Down the House" premiered June 19, 2015 through CMT Canada. It was uploaded to his official YouTube channel a week later, on June 26, 2015. A promotional campaign for the video incorporated a lyric from the song ("Y'all hastag this") and an official hashtag #BringDowntheHouse.

== Track listing ==
- Digital download (album version)
4. "Bring Down the House" – 3:28
- Digital download (remix)
1. "Bring Down the House" [Remix] – 3:07

== Chart performance ==
=== Weekly charts ===
Chart (2015)	Peak position
Canada (Canadian Hot 100)	43
Canada Country (Billboard)	7

=== Year end charts ===
Chart (2015)	Position
Canada Country (Billboard)	22

== Certifications and sales ==
Region	Certification	Certified units/sales
Canada (Music Canada)	3× Platinum	240,000^{‡}
^{‡} Sales+streaming figures based on certification alone.

== Release history ==
Country	Date	Format	Version	Label	Ref.
Canada	May 25, 2015	Country radio	Original	Open Road	
Canada	December 4, 2015	Digital download	Remix	Open Road	
