= Mountain Man (Dean Brody song) =

2014 single by Dean Brody

Single by Dean Brody

from the album Crop Circles
- Released: September 2014
- Genre: Country
- Length: 3:18
- Label: Open Road
- Songwriter: Dean Brody
- Producer: Matt Rovey

Dean Brody singles chronology
"Another Man's Gold" (2014)	"Mountain Man" (2014)	"Upside Down" (2015)

Music video
- "Mountain Man" on YouTube

"Mountain Man" is a song recorded by Canadian country artist Dean Brody. It was the fourth single off Brody's fourth studio album Crop Circles.

== Commercial performance ==
"Mountain Man" reached a peak of number 13 on Billboard Canada Country chart for the week of November 15, 2014, marking a career lowest charting entry at the time. Nonetheless, it also peaked at number 96 on the Canadian Hot 100 one week earlier, and the song has been certified Gold by Music Canada.

== Music video ==
The official music video for "Mountain Man" was directed by Dan LeMoyne and premiered on September 26, 2014.

== Charts ==
Chart performance for "Mountain Man"
Chart (2021)	Peak position
Canada (Canadian Hot 100)	96
Canada Country (Billboard)	13

== Certifications ==
Region	Certification	Certified units/sales
Canada (Music Canada)	Gold	40,000^{‡}
^{‡} Sales+streaming figures based on certification alone.
