= Canadian Summer =

2020 song by Dean Brody

Single by Dean Brody

from the album Boys
- Released: June 24, 2020
- Genre: Country
- Length: 3:24
- Label: Scurvy Dog
- Songwriter: Dean Brody
- Producer: Matt Rovey

Dean Brody singles chronology
"Can't Help Myself" (2020)	"Canadian Summer" (2020)	"Boys" (2020)

"Canadian Summer" is a song written and recorded by Canadian country music artist Dean Brody. It was released in June 2020 through Brody’s label, Scurvy Dog Music.

== Background ==
In an interview with Global News, Brody remarked that "It’s kind of a nostalgic song for me. I wrote it thinking that it would come out in the fall but I think during the summer is kind of cool, especially now with us having to be inside for so long with COVID. With being Canadians, we already have a long winter as it is. This song just celebrates what makes our summers unique. There’s a little bit of Canadiana thrown in there and I’m hoping people love it. We had a lot of fun recording it and bringing it to life".

== Critical reception ==
Courtney Fielder of Country100 Moose Jaw called the track a "fantastic tune", while FYI Music News labelled the song a "slam dunk hit".

== Commercial performance ==
"Canadian Summer" peaked at number 56 on the Canadian Hot 100 for the week of September 26, 2020. It was a Number One hit on the Billboard Canada Country chart for the same week, marking Brody's fifth number one. It also set the record as the most played song ever at Canadian country radio in a single week on the Nielsen BDS charts with 1817 spins, breaking the record that he previously set with "Can't Help Myself" earlier in 2020. The song has been certified Platinum by Music Canada.

== Charts ==
Chart (2020)	Peak position
Canada (Canadian Hot 100)	56
Canada Country (Billboard)	1

== Certifications ==
Region	Certification	Certified units/sales
Canada (Music Canada)	Platinum	80,000^{‡}
^{‡} Sales+streaming figures based on certification alone.
