= Lightning Bug (song) =

2021 single by Dean Brody

Single by Dean Brody

from the album Boys
- Released: April 28, 2021
- Genre: Country pop
- Length: 2:47
- Label: Scurvy Dog; Starseed
- Songwriter(s): Dean Brody
- Producer(s): Todd Clark

Dean Brody singles chronology
"Boys" (2020)	"Lightning Bug" (2021)	"More Drinkin' Than Fishin'" (2021)

Lyric Video
- "Lightning Bug" on YouTube

"Lightning Bug" is a song written and recorded by Canadian country artist Dean Brody. The song was released to radio in April 2021, as the fourth single from Brody's seventh studio album Boys.

== Background ==
Brody wrote "Lightning Bug" by himself, and it was inspired by one of his first songwriting trips to Nashville, Tennessee. He remarked that he wanted to write a song "that captured the magic of being caught up in a warm summer night. It’s meant to tell the story of being in love with that special someone, with an almost dreamlike soundscape".

== Critical reception ==
Nanci Dagg of Canadian Beats Media referred to the track as a "heartfelt love song", adding that it "takes listeners to that place where those magical memories of falling in love happen while providing everyone that listens to it a bright spot in what has been a challenging year for us all". Courtney Fielder of Country100.7 called the song a "hit", saying it was released "just in time for summer".

== Commercial performance ==
"Lightning Bug" peaked at number 78 on the Canadian Hot 100 for the week of August 7, 2021. It also peaked at number seven on the Billboard Canada Country chart for the same week, marking Brody's twenty-ninth career top ten hit. It has been certified Gold by Music Canada.

== Charts ==
Chart performance for "Lightning Bug"
Chart (2021)	Peak position
Canada (Canadian Hot 100)	78
Canada Country (Billboard)	7

== Certifications ==
Region	Certification	Certified units/sales
Canada (Music Canada)	Gold	40,000^{‡}
^{‡} Sales+streaming figures based on certification alone.
