= Wildflower (Dean Brody song) =

Single by Dean Brody

from the album Trail in Life
- Released: March 15, 2010
- Genre: Country
- Length: 3:55
- Label: Open Road
- Songwriter: Dean Brody
- Producer: Matt Rovey

Dean Brody singles chronology
"Undone" (2009)	"Wildflower" (2010)	"Roll That Barrel Out" (2010)

"Wildflower" is a song written and recorded by Canadian country music artist Dean Brody. It was released in March 2010 as the lead single to his 2010 album Trail in Life. The song reached number 86 on the Canadian Hot 100 in mid-2010.

== Content ==
"Wildflower" is a ballad in which the narrator compares the beauty of his wife to a wildflower.

== Reception ==
Roughstock critic Matt Bjorke called it a "sweet, laid-back and romantic ballad." He goes on to say that the "instrumentation is fantastic (and fiddle and mandolin-laced) while Brody's voice - while not 'soaring' like a James Otto or Ronnie Dunn – suits the mood and melody of the song." Stephen Cooke of the Halifax Chronicle-Herald said that the song can also be interpreted as, "a plea for acceptance at a time when bullying and intolerance are a key concern."

== Music video ==
The music video was directed by Jeth Weinrich and premiered in March 2010. The music video was filmed in the Mojave Desert in California.

== Chart positions ==
Chart (2010)	Peak position
Canada Hot 100 (Billboard)	86
Canada Country (Billboard)	19
