= Crop Circles (album) =

2013 album by Dean Brody

Studio album by Dean Brody
- Released: November 5, 2013
- Genre: Country
- Length: 45:25
- Label: Open Road
- Producer: Matt Rovey

Dean Brody chronology
Dirt (2012)	Crop Circles (2013)	Gypsy Road (2015)

Singles from Crop Circles
- 1. "Bounty" Released: August 19, 2013; 2. "Crop Circles" Released: December 2013; 3. "Another Man's Gold" Released: April 2014; 4. "Mountain Man" Released: September 2014

Professional ratings
Review scores
Source	Rating
Top Country	5/5 stars

Crop Circles is the fourth studio album by Canadian country music artist Dean Brody. It was released on November 5, 2013, via Open Road Recordings. The first single, "Bounty", featuring guest vocals from Lindi Ortega, was released in August 2013.

Crop Circles won Country Album of the Year at the 2014 Juno Awards.

== Critical reception ==
Shenieka Russell-Metcalf of Top Country gave the album five stars out of five, writing that "the album's lyrical content and music is pure brilliant."

== Track listing ==
No.	Title	Writer(s)	Length
1.	"Four Wheel Drive"	Dean Brody	3:47
2.	"Bounty" (featuring Lindi Ortega)	Brody	4:12
3.	"Sand in My Soul"	Brody; Marty Dodson	2:49
4.	"Crop Circles"	Brody	4:27
5.	"Mountain Man"	Brody	3:18
6.	"Another Man's Gold"	Brody; Jason Barry	4:04
7.	"Back to the Front Porch"	Brody; Dodson; Matt Rovey	3:12
8.	"Marianne"	Brody	4:16
9.	"The Little Things About Us"	Brody	3:46
10.	"My Last Broken Heart"	Jeff Middleton; Josh Thompson	3:27
11.	"The Old Sand Bar"	Brody	3:19
12.	"Kansas Cried"	Brody; Matt Fleener	4:48
Total length:			45:25

== Chart performance ==
=== Album ===
Chart (2013)	Peak position
Canadian Albums (Billboard)	17

=== Singles ===
Year	Single	Peak chart positions	
Year	Single	CAN Country	CAN
2013	"Bounty"	1	46
2013	"Crop Circles"	9	62
2014	"Another Man's Gold"	7	85
2014	"Mountain Man"	13	96
