= Little Yellow Blanket =

Single by Dean Brody

from the album Trail in Life
- Released: July 11, 2011
- Genre: Country
- Length: 2:59
- Label: Open Road
- Songwriter: Dean Brody
- Producer: Matt Rovey

Dean Brody singles chronology
"People Know You by Your First Name" (2011)	"Little Yellow Blanket" (2011)	"Canadian Girls" (2012)

"Little Yellow Blanket" is a song written and recorded by Canadian country music artist Dean Brody. It was released in July 2011 as the fifth single to his 2010 album Trail in Life. The song reached No. 71 on the Canadian Hot 100 in October 2011.

== Chart positions ==
Chart (2011)	Peak position
Canada Hot 100 (Billboard)	71
Canada Country (Billboard)	8
