= Trail in Life =

Studio album by Dean Brody
- Released: August 17, 2010
- Genre: Country
- Length: 37:02
- Label: Open Road
- Producer: Matt Rovey

Dean Brody chronology
Dean Brody (2009)	Trail in Life (2010)	Dirt (2012)

Singles from Trail in Life
- 1. "Wildflower" Released: March 15, 2010; 2. "Roll That Barrel Out" Released: July 5, 2010; 3. "Trail in Life" Released: October 25, 2010; 4. "People Know You by Your First Name" Released: March 14, 2011; 5. "Little Yellow Blanket" Released: July 11, 2011

Professional ratings
Review scores
Source	Rating
Roughstock	4/5 stars

Trail in Life is the second studio album by Canadian country music artist Dean Brody. It was released on August 17, 2010 via Open Road Recordings under the production of Matt Rovey. The album includes the singles "Wildflower," "Roll That Barrel Out," "Trail in Life," "People Know You by Your First Name" and "Little Yellow Blanket."

== Background ==
"My life's been kind of a trail - it hasn't been one spot for 30 years - it's been a bunch of different places, different memories and different friends. It's about time passing and reminiscing," Mr. Brody is quoted as saying of the album. "Songs about driving, good old times, good old days and growing up."

== Track listing ==
All tracks are written by Dean Brody except where noted

No.	Title	Writer(s)	Length
1.	"People Know You by Your First Name"	Brody; Moke Cameron	3:15
2.	"Roll That Barrel Out"		3:10
3.	"Little Yellow Blanket"		2:59
4.	"Angelina"		4:07
5.	"Trail in Life"		4:37
6.	"Sunday Drive"		3:29
7.	"The Kitchen Song"		3:44
8.	"Wildflower"		3:55
9.	"Gypsy Girl"		4:03
10.	"The Porch"		3:43
Total length:			37:02

== Chart performance ==
=== Singles ===
Year	Single	Peak positions
Year	Single	CAN
2010	"Wildflower"	86
2010	"Roll That Barrel Out"	69
2010	"Trail in Life"	81
2011	"People Know You by Your First Name"	93
2011	"Little Yellow Blanket"	71
