= Brothers (Dean Brody song) =

Single by Dean Brody

from the album Dean Brody
- Released: October 27, 2008
- Genre: Country
- Length: 4:58
- Label: Broken Bow
- Songwriter: Dean Brody
- Producer: Matt Rovey

Dean Brody Canada singles chronology
"Brothers" (2008)	"Dirt Road Scholar" (2009)

Dean Brody U.S. singles chronology
"Brothers" (2008)	"Gravity" (2009)

"Brothers" is the debut single by Canadian country music artist Dean Brody, released in October 2008. The song is from his 2009 self-titled debut album. It is a mid-tempo ballad about the relationship between two brothers, where one of them is going to war. "Brothers" received positive reviews from critics for its content and stark contrast to other country songs on the radio.

The song peaked in the top 10 of the Radio & Records Country Singles chart in Canada and number 76 on the Canadian Hot 100. It also reached the top 30 on the Billboard Hot Country Songs chart in the United States.

== Content ==
"Brothers" is a mid-tempo ballad describing the relationship between the narrator and his brother, who is about to go to war. In the first verse, the narrator is reluctant to let his brother leave, offering to do anything that will keep him home. The narrator's brother reassures him by saying "This is what brothers are for". In the second verse, the narrator says that out of all his heroes, his brother is his main. The two of them interact through letters in the second verse, with the narrator telling his brother how much he misses him. Finally, in the third verse, the narrator's brother comes back home, but uses a wheelchair after being injured in the war. As they hug, the brother apologizes to the narrator for having to be pushed home, but the narrator simply replies, "This is what brothers are for."

== Critical reception ==
Jim Malec of The 9513 gave the song a thumbs-up rating, saying "'Brothers' veers widely from the standard radio formula in one very significant way—for a song that so pointedly references the times in which we live, it isn't particularly uplifting, nor does it resolve into a sound byte-worthy declaration of hopefulness." Roughstock critic Matt Bjorke described the song as "a well-written story song by any measure", adding that it was "heartening to see such a song score with radio." He added that his original review, written in October 2008, was negative in nature because at the time, he did not understand the song's context.

== Music video ==
The music video was directed by Stephen Scott.

== Chart positions ==
Chart (2008–2009)	Peak position
Canada Hot 100 (Billboard)	76
Canada Country (Billboard)	10
US Hot Country Songs (Billboard)	26
