= People Know You by Your First Name =

Single by Dean Brody

from the album Trail in Life
- Released: March 14, 2011
- Genre: Country
- Length: 3:15
- Label: Open Road
- Songwriters: Dean Brody, Moke Cameron
- Producer: Matt Rovey

Dean Brody singles chronology
"Trail in Life" (2010)	"People Know You by Your First Name" (2011)	"Little Yellow Blanket" (2011)

"People Know You by Your First Name" is a song co-written and recorded by Canadian country music artist Dean Brody. It was released in March 2011 as the fourth single to his 2010 album Trail in Life. The song reached No. 93 on the Canadian Hot 100 in June 2011.

== Content ==
"People Know You by Your First Name" is a song that chronicles small-town life and the people who live there. The narrator states that people in the town know you by what type of pickup truck you drive and what you did the night before.

== Reception ==
Roughstock critic Matt Bjorke said that the "lyrics are tight and the chorus fits right." He goes on to call the song, "a slice of modern country music which could’ve been a big hit in America had it been on Brody’s first album." He compares the song to Justin Moore's "Small Town USA" but said that Brody's song feels "more universal" and "worldly."

== Music video ==
The music video was directed by Jeth Weinrich and premiered in March 2011. It was filmed in the Colorado Desert in California and features the Adolfo Camarillo High School football team.

== Chart positions ==
Chart (2011)	Peak position
Canada Hot 100 (Billboard)	93
Canada Country (Billboard)	8
