= Can't Help Myself (Dean Brody and the Reklaws song) =

Single by Dean Brody and the Reklaws

from the album Boys
- Released: February 14, 2020
- Genre: Country
- Length: 2:38
- Label: Scurvy Dog
- Songwriters: Tyler Hubbard; Brian Kelley; Blake Redferrin; Jason E. Afable; Rocky Block
- Producer: Todd Clark

Dean Brody singles chronology
"Black Sheep" (2019)	"Can't Help Myself" (2020)	"Canadian Summer" (2020)

The Reklaws singles chronology
"Old Country Soul" (2019)	"Can't Help Myself" (2020)	"Where I'm From" (2020)

Music video
- "Can't Help Myself" on YouTube

"Can't Help Myself" is a song recorded by Canadian country music artists Dean Brody and the Reklaws. It was independently released in February 2020 through Brody’s label, Scurvy Dog Music. The song was written by Tyler Hubbard and Brian Kelley of Florida Georgia Line, along with Blake Redferrin, Jason E. Afable, and Rocky Block.

== Critical reception ==
Matthew Weaver of Corus Radio called the song the "perfect summer tune" that "gets the party started".

== Music video ==
The music video was directed by Ben Knechtel and premiered on March 11, 2020. The video was filmed in Toronto, Ontario, and featured Brody, the Reklaws, and fans who were able to enter a casting call. It also featured a can of Brody’s new beer, "Hucklejack Canadian Lager".

== Commercial performance ==
"Can’t Help Myself" peaked at number 49 on the Canadian Hot 100 for the week of June 6, 2020. It was a Number One hit on the Billboard Canada Country chart for the same week while setting a record as the most played song ever at Canadian country radio in a single week on the Nielsen BDS charts with 1782 spins, a record later broken that year by Brody's Canadian Summer. The song has been certified Triple Platinum by Music Canada. As of May 2021, the song had received over 13.8 million streams through Spotify.

== Charts ==
Chart (2020)	Peak position
Canada Hot 100 (Billboard)	49
Canada Country (Billboard)	1

== Certifications ==
Region	Certification	Certified units/sales
Canada (Music Canada)	3× Platinum	240,000^{‡}
^{‡} Sales+streaming figures based on certification alone.
