= Love Would Be Enough =

Single by Dean Brody

from the album Gypsy Road
- Released: October 23, 2015
- Genre: Country
- Length: 2:54
- Label: Open Road
- Songwriter(s): Dean Brody
- Producer(s): Matt Rovey

Dean Brody singles chronology
"Bring Down the House" (2015)	"Love Would Be Enough" (2015)	"Monterey" (2016)

"Love Would Be Enough" is the third single from Canadian country singer Dean Brody's album Gypsy Road. The song was released to radio on October 23, 2015.

== Background ==
Brody announced the song as a single on October 23, 2015, shortly before finishing a Canada-wide tour with Paul Brandt.

The song is about a man telling his lover that even if they had nothing to their name or if they were broke, their love for each other would be enough.

== Music video ==
The music video premiered in November 2015. The video contains footage of Brody on tour.

== Chart performance ==
Chart (2015–16)	Peak position
Canada (Canadian Hot 100)	100
Canada Country (Billboard)	4
