= Where'd You Learn How to Do That =

2022 single by Dean Brody

Single by Dean Brody

from the album Right Round Here
- Released: May 13, 2022
- Genre: Country
- Length: 2:54
- Label: Starseed
- Songwriters: Blake Redferrin; Jenna Walker; Stuart Walker; Thomas Salter
- Producer: Todd Clark

Dean Brody singles chronology
"I'd Go to Jail" (2021)	"Where'd You Learn How to Do That" (2022)	"You Got the Wrong Guy" (2022)

Lyric Video
- "Where'd You Learn How to Do That" on YouTube

"Where'd You Learn How to Do That" is a song recorded by Canadian country artist Dean Brody. The song was written by Jenna Walker and Stuart Walker of the Reklaws, along with Blake Redferrin and Tawgs Salter. It was the first single released ahead of Brody's eight studio album Right Round Here.

== Background ==
Brody released "Where'd You Learn How to Do That" ahead of a slate of summer 2022 tour dates, remarking that it had "been a while" since he had a song "that brings a party like this one does".

Brody's fellow country artists and friends Stuart and Jenna Walker of the sibling duo the Reklaws co-wrote the track with Thomas "Tawgs" Salter and Blake Redferrin. Stuart Walker remarked that when they originally finished the song, Redferrin sang it with his usual "Southern drawl", which led Walker to realize that Brody would have a more suitable voice for the song. Knowing that Brody was looking for new songs, they passed it along through their manager.

== Critical reception ==
Nanci Dagg of Canadian Beats Media referred to the song as "a fun, upbeat track showing off [Brody's] country roots".

== Accolades ==
Year	Association	Category	Result	Ref
2023	Canadian Country Music Association	Single of the Year	Nominated	

== Charts ==
Chart performance for "Where'd You Learn How to Do That"
Chart (2022–2023)	Peak position
Australia Country Hot 50 (The Music)	31
Canada (Canadian Hot 100)	62
Canada Country (Billboard)	1

== Certifications ==
Certifications for "Where'd You Learn How to Do That"
Region	Certification	Certified units/sales
Canada (Music Canada)	Platinum	80,000^{‡}
^{‡} Sales+streaming figures based on certification alone.
