= Bush Party =

2016 song by Dean Brody

Single by Dean Brody

from the album Beautiful Freakshow
- Released: July 29, 2016
- Genre: Country
- Length: 3:42
- Label: Open Road
- Songwriter(s): Dean Brody
- Producer(s): Matt Rovey

Dean Brody singles chronology
"Monterey" (2016)	"Bush Party" (2016)	"Time" (2016)

Music video
- "Bush Party" on YouTube

"Bush Party" is a song written and recorded by Canadian country music artist Dean Brody. It was the lead single from Brody's sixth studio album Beautiful Freakshow.

== Critical reception ==
Dutch Bickell of Canadian Beats Media called the track a "Friday night anthem", saying it is a "sing along at the top of your lungs kind of tune". Sound Check Entertainment said the song "will get your foot stompin'".

== Commercial performance ==
"Bush Party" debuted as the most-added song of the week on Canadian country radio. It would reach a peak of number 6 on the Billboard Canada Country chart, marking Brody's nineteenth Top 10 hit. The song was certified Platinum by Music Canada.

== Music video ==
The official music video for "Bush Party" premiered on August 8, 2016. It features Brody and his friends crashing an art gallery.

== Charts ==
Chart (2016)	Peak position
Canada Country (Billboard)	6

== Certifications ==
Region	Certification	Certified units/sales
Canada (Music Canada)	Platinum	80,000^{‡}
^{‡} Sales+streaming figures based on certification alone.
