= Beautiful Freakshow =

Studio album by Dean Brody
- Released: October 21, 2016
- Genre: Country
- Length: 37:01
- Label: Open Road
- Producer: Matt Rovey

Dean Brody chronology
Gypsy Road (2015)	Beautiful Freakshow (2016)	Black Sheep (2019)

Singles from Beautiful Freakshow
- 1. "Bush Party" Released: July 29, 2016; 2. "Time" Released: November 18, 2016; 3. "Beautiful Freakshow" Released: April 12, 2017; 4. "Soggy Bottom Summer" Released: July 12, 2017; 5. "8th Day" Released: November 1, 2017

Beautiful Freakshow is the sixth studio album by Canadian country music artist Dean Brody. It was released on October 21, 2016 via Open Road Recordings. Brody wrote or co-wrote all but one of the album's tracks. Beautiful Freakshow debuted at number 15 on the Canadian Albums Chart. Three of its singles have charted in the top 10 of the Canada Country airplay chart, including "8th Day", which reached number one.

== Singles ==
"Bush Party" was released as the album's lead single on July 29, 2016. An accompanying music video premiered August 8, 2016. The song entered the Billboard Canada Country chart at number 39 and has since reached a peak position of 6.

"Time" was released to digital retailers on September 9, 2016 as the first promotional single. It debuted at number 37 on the Canadian Digital Songs component chart. It was later serviced to Canadian radio on November 18, 2016 as the second official single.

The title track, "Beautiful Freakshow", was released October 7, 2016 as the record's second promotional single. It features a rap from co-writer Shevy Price. It was later issued to Canadian country radio April 12, 2017 as the third official single.

== Promotion ==
Brody went on tour in support of the album in the spring of 2017. The Beautiful Freakshow Tour commenced on April 25, 2017 in Hamilton, Ontario, with dates through June 3, 2017. High Valley accompanied Brody on seven dates in Ontario, while Madeline Merlo accompanied the tour for the dates in the prairie provinces; the James Barker Band served as an opening act on all tour dates.

== Critical reception ==
Professional ratings
Review scores
Source	Rating
Exclaim!	6/10

Anthony Easton of Exclaim! gave the album a mixed review and a 6-out-of-10 rating, labelling inconsistency as the album's downfall. "An album needs a frame, and a ruthless culling instinct," he writes. "Freakshow has neither. I keep wanting more from Brody, and he doesn't quite deliver."

== Track listing ==
No.	Title	Writer(s)	Length
1.	"Bush Party"	Dean Brody	3:42
2.	"Soggy Bottom Summer" (featuring Alan Doyle)	Brody	2:57
3.	"Little Blue Volkswagen" (featuring Sarah Blackwood)	Brody	3:35
4.	"Beautiful Freakshow" (featuring Shevy Price)	Brody; Shevy Price	3:30
5.	"8th Day"	Brody; Matt Rovey	3:02
6.	"Blueberry Sky"	Brody	4:09
7.	"Beautiful Girl"	Brody	4:55
8.	"Memory Lane"	Brody; Jason Barry	3:22
9.	"Time"	Brody	4:07
10.	"Another Saturday Night"	Sam Cooke	3:42
Total length:			37:01

== Chart performance ==
=== Album ===
Chart (2016)	Peak position
Canadian Albums (Billboard)	15
