= Beautiful Freakshow (song) =

2017 single by Dean Brody

Single by Dean Brody featuring Shevy Price

from the album Beautiful Freakshow
- Released: April 12, 2017
- Length: 3:30
- Label: Open Road
- Songwriter(s): Dean Brody; Shevy Price
- Producer(s): Matt Rovey

Dean Brody singles chronology
| "Time" (2016) | "Beautiful Freakshow" (2017) | "Soggy Bottom Summer" (2017) |

Music video
- "Beautiful Freakshow" on YouTube

"Beautiful Freakshow" is a song recorded by Canadian country artist Dean Brody featuring rapper Shevy Price. Brody and Price wrote the song. It was the third single off Brody's sixth studio album Beautiful Freakshow.

== Background ==
Brody stated that the track is "a love song about crossing boundaries whether it's cultural or socio-economic ones". He remarked that while writing the song, he "thought what was the complete opposite of a country boy — probably an urban girl who likes hip hop or rap". While living in Nova Scotia at the time, Brody asked a friend who was familiar with the club scene in Halifax for an artist recommendation, and his friend suggested Shevy Price to him.

== Critical reception ==
Graham Rockingham of The Hamilton Spectator described the song as a "mix of spaghetti western whistling, surf guitar, hip hop beats and Price's rapping". Taryn McElheran of Canadian Beats Media called the track "progressive," and said "the fusion of country and rap [comes] together to create something unique and beautiful". Top Country stated "the track takes a look at an exquisite, imperfect, relationship between two people coming together from different walks of life, which is mirrored by the synergistic fusion of country and rap."

== Commercial performance ==
"Beautiful Freakshow" reached a peak of number 24 on Billboard Canada Country chart for the week of June 10, 2017, marking Brody's lowest career charting entry. Nonetheless, it has been certified Platinum by Music Canada.

== Music video ==
The official music video for "Beautiful Freakshow" premiered on April 12, 2017. It was filmed in Cabo San Lucas, Mexico and features both Brody and Price. A group of local performers participated in the video including "flamenco artists, mariachi players, hip hop break dancers, [and] rodeo riders". Brody wanted to have a local matador in the video but the matador wanted to kill a bull and Brody said "there was no way we were going to kill an animal for the video".

== Charts ==
Chart performance for "Beautiful Freakshow"
| Chart (2021) | Peak position |
|---|---|
| Canada Country (Billboard) | 24 |

== Certifications ==
| Region | Certification | Certified units/sales |
|---|---|---|
| Canada (Music Canada) | Platinum | 80,000^{‡} |
^{‡} Sales+streaming figures based on certification alone.
