= Boys (Dean Brody song) =

2020 song by Dean Brody

Single by Dean Brody featuring Mickey Guyton (Note: The song was originally listed as "Dean Brody featuring Mickey Guyton", it was later altered to list the song as a duet in 2021.)

from the album Boys
- Released: November 18, 2020
- Genre: Country
- Length: 3:15
- Label: Scurvy Dog
- Songwriters: Emily Reid; Matt McVaney; Travis Wood
- Producer: Todd Clark

Dean Brody singles chronology
"Canadian Summer" (2020)	"Boys" (2020)	"Lightning Bug" (2021)

Mickey Guyton singles chronology
"Heaven Down Here" (2020)	"Boys" (2020)	"Remember Her Name" (2021)

Lyric Video
- "Boys" on YouTube

"Boys" is a song recorded by Canadian country artist Dean Brody and American country artist Mickey Guyton. The song was written by Emily Reid, Matt McVaney, and Travis Wood. It was the third single from Brody's seventh studio album, Boys.

== Background and content ==
The song is about the difference between how men and boys behave in a relationship. Brody remarked that he was excited to have Guyton's "incredible vocals" on the track.

== Critical reception ==
"Boys" received generally positive reviews, with several outfits praising Mickey Guyton's presence on the song. The Reviews Are In called the song a "wonderful and beautifully sung duet" giving it an A+ and saying "the addition of Mickey Guyton's voice is fantastic". Kerry Doole of FYI Music News referred to the track as a "reflective and philosophical ballad that [Brody] delivers convincingly" adding that "the vocal contribution of Guyton gives it extra resonance". The British Columbia Music Association described the song as a "truly outstanding offering".

== Commercial performance ==
"Boys" reached a peak of number 1 on Billboard Canada Country chart on April 3, 2021. It was Brody's sixth number-one hit, and Guyton's first-ever number one on any chart, as well as her highest-charting song on Canada Country. She also became the first black woman to top the Canada Country chart. It peaked at number 65 on the Canadian Hot 100, marking Guyton's first entry on that chart. The song has been certified Gold by Music Canada.

== Charts ==
Chart performance for "Boys"
Chart (2021)	Peak position
Canada (Canadian Hot 100)	65
Canada Country (Billboard)	1

== Certifications ==
Region	Certification	Certified units/sales
Canada (Music Canada)	Gold	40,000^{‡}
^{‡} Sales+streaming figures based on certification alone.
