= You Got the Wrong Guy =

2022 single by Dean Brody

Single by Dean Brody

from the album Right Round Here
- Released: September 30, 2022
- Genre: Country pop
- Length: 3:00
- Label: Starseed
- Songwriters: Jason Massey; Jesse Lee; Travis Wood
- Producer: Todd Clark

Dean Brody singles chronology
"Where'd You Learn How to Do That" (2022)	"You Got the Wrong Guy" (2022)	"Broke" (2023)

Lyric video
- "You Got the Wrong Guy" on YouTube

"You Got the Wrong Guy" is a song recorded by Canadian country artist Dean Brody. It was written by Jason Massey, Jesse Lee, and Travis Wood. The song is the second single from Brody's eight studio album Right Round Here.

== Background ==
Brody remarked that it is "very rare for me to relate so strongly to a song that I didn't write", but the "first time I heard this one I knew it was meant for me." He believed that the song "tells a story that so many of us can relate to." The song is the follow-up to Brody's number-one single "Where'd You Learn How to Do That".

== Critical reception ==
Nanci Dagg of Canadian Beats Media stated that the song shows Brody's "deep-rooted beliefs in standing up for what is right and takes listeners through the all too familiar story of seeing someone you love and care for give their heart to someone who doesn't deserve it".

== Charts ==
Chart performance for "You Got the Wrong Guy"
Chart (2023)	Peak position
Canada (Canadian Hot 100)	98
Canada Country (Billboard)	4

== Certifications ==
Certifications for "You Got the Wrong Guy"
Region	Certification	Certified units/sales
Canada (Music Canada)	Gold	40,000^{‡}
^{‡} Sales+streaming figures based on certification alone.
