= Dean Brody (album) =

Studio album by Dean Brody
- Released: April 28, 2009
- Studios: The Castle (Franklin, Tennessee); The Sound Station, Wedgewood Sound and The Padded Room (Nashville, Tennessee)
- Genre: Country
- Length: 41:28
- Label: Broken Bow
- Producer: Matt Rovey

Dean Brody chronology
| Dean Brody (2009) | Trail in Life (2010) |

Singles from Dean Brody
- 1. "Brothers" Released: October 27, 2008; 2. "Dirt Roads Scholar" Released: May 4, 2009; 3. "Gravity" Released: June 22, 2009; 4. "Undone" Released: October 5, 2009

Professional ratings
Review scores
| Source | Rating |
|---|---|
| Allmusic | 3.5/5 stars |
| Country Weekly | 3.5/5 stars |

Dean Brody is the debut studio album by Canadian country music singer Dean Brody. It was released on April 28, 2009 via Broken Bow Records under the production of Matt Rovey. The album includes the single "Brothers", his only country hit in the United States. Brody wrote or co-wrote nine of the album's eleven songs.

== Critical reception ==
Chris Neal of Country Weekly magazine gave the album a three-and-a-half star rating out of five. He said that the album contained well-written lyrics with a strong sense of individuality. He also said that Brody "doesn't reinvent current Music Row formulas — he just does them a little smarter and sharper than some do."

Matt Bjorke of Roughstock called their own album a "fantastic collection of traditionalist modern country music" that was not the hit it should have been. He noted that only one single, the hit "Brothers" was the only track to make it to the charts in the U.S. While Brody's debut album was clearly not a breakout in the United States, it fared better in the artist's homeland of Canada, where three singles earned top-10 rankings. The three hit singles were, "Brothers", "Dirt Road Scholar" and "Undone".

The single "Brothers" won the Canadian Country Music Association "Song of the Year" for 2009. "Dirt Road Scholar" was 2009's most-played music video for a new artist in Canada.

== Track listing ==
| No. | Title | Writer(s) | Length |
|---|---|---|---|
| 1. | "Undone" | Dean Brody | 3:23 |
| 2. | "Dirt Roads Scholar" | Brody | 3:07 |
| 3. | "Gravity" | Brody | 3:56 |
| 4. | "This Ain't the Same Town (That I Painted Red)" | Neal Coty; Jim Collins; Jimmy Melton | 3:11 |
| 5. | "Lazy Days" | Brody | 4:07 |
| 6. | "Brothers" | Brody | 4:58 |
| 7. | "Old Joe Riley" | Steve Bogard; Rick Giles | 3:03 |
| 8. | "This Old Raft" | Brody; Matt Rovey | 3:50 |
| 9. | "Back in Style" | Brody; Rovey | 3:37 |
| 10. | "Cattleman's Gun" | Brody | 4:09 |
| 11. | "Up on the Moon" | Brody; Ryan Fleener | 3:58 |

== Personnel ==
- Eddie Bayers – drums
- Dean Brody – lead vocals, acoustic guitar
- Jim "Moose" Brown – piano, keyboards, Hammond organ, Wurlitzer electric piano
- Melodie Crittenden – background vocals
- Stuart Duncan – fiddle, mandolin
- Paul Franklin – steel guitar
- Kenny Greenberg – electric guitar
- B. James Lowry – acoustic guitar
- Brent Mason – electric guitar
- Jeff Middleton – banjo
- James Mitchell – electric guitar
- Phillip Moore – acoustic guitar, electric guitar, slide guitar
- John Wesley Ryles – background vocals
- Scotty Sanders – Dobro
- Russell Terrell – background vocals
- Rhonda Vincent – background vocals
- Bruce Watkins – acoustic guitar, banjo
- Lonnie Wilson – drums
- Glenn Worf – bass guitar

== Chart performance ==
=== Album ===
| Chart (2009) | Peak position |
|---|---|
| U.S. Billboard Top Country Albums | 32 |
| U.S. Billboard 200 | 187 |
| U.S. Billboard Top Heatseekers | 4 |
| U.S. Billboard Top Independent Albums | 23 |

=== Singles ===
| Year | Single | Peak chart positions | |
| Year | Single | CAN | US Country |
|---|---|---|---|
| 2008 | "Brothers" | 76 | 26 |
| 2009 | "Dirt Road Scholar" | 72 | — |
| 2009 | "Gravity" | — | — |
| 2009 | "Undone" | 79 | — |
"—" denotes releases that did not chart
