= Trail in Life (song) =

Single by Dean Brody

from the album Trail in Life
- Released: October 25, 2010
- Genre: Country
- Length: 4:37
- Label: Open Road
- Songwriter: Dean Brody
- Producer: Matt Rovey

Dean Brody singles chronology
"Roll That Barrel Out" (2010)	"Trail in Life" (2010)	"People Know You by Your First Name" (2011)

"Trail in Life" is a song written and recorded by Canadian country music artist Dean Brody. It was released in October 2010 as the third single from his 2010 album Trail in Life. The song reached number 81 on the Canadian Hot 100 in early 2011.

== Content ==
The narrator is a man who wonders what happened to his teenage mother who gave him up for adoption.

== Reception ==
Roughstock critic Matt Bjorke called it a "beautifully written and sung song that recalls Garth Brooks’ "What She's Doing Now" in some parts but is a much, much more interesting song in that the verses discuss different parts of the narrator's life, from that first love to that college best friend to his life as an adopted child in a loving family." He goes on to call it "personal and intimate."

== Music video ==
The music video was directed by Jeth Weinrich and premiered in November 2010. The music video was filmed in Manhattan and Montauk, New York, the video also features scenes set at Long Island’s Deep Hollow Ranch.

== Chart positions ==
Chart (2010–11)	Peak position
Canada Hot 100 (Billboard)	81
Canada Country (Billboard)	3
