= Time (Dean Brody song) =

Single by Dean Brody

from the album Beautiful Freakshow
- Released: November 18, 2016
- Genre: Country
- Length: 4:07
- Label: Open Road
- Songwriter(s): Dean Brody
- Producer(s): Matt Rovey

Dean Brody singles chronology
| "Bush Party" (2016) | "Time" (2016) | "Beautiful Freakshow" (2016) |

"Time" is the second single from Canadian country singer Dean Brody's album Beautiful Freakshow (2016). The song was released with its album through Open Road Recordings and was released as a single on November 18, 2016.

== Background ==
Prior to the single's official release, "Time" was released before the album's release to iTunes as a promotional single.

The song describes three stories of people who let time slip by, including a high school graduate reminiscing about younger days; a father who never had time to attend his son's baseball games; and a girl who ignored her grandfather on fishing trips.

== Commercial performance ==
As of December 2016, the song had received 250,000 streams through Spotify.

== Music video ==
An accompanying music video directed by Stephano Barberis premiered on December 8, 2016. The video features personal stories about the importance of spending time with loved ones interspersed with footage of Brody singing, and was filmed in British Columbia.

== Chart performance ==
| Chart (2016–17) | Peak position |
|---|---|
| Canada Digital Songs (Billboard) | 37 |
| Canada Country (Billboard) | 2 |

=== Year-end charts ===
| Chart (2017) | Position |
|---|---|
| Canada Country (Billboard) | 29 |
