= Dirt (Dean Brody album) =

Studio album by Dean Brody
- Released: April 24, 2012
- Genre: Country
- Length: 40:21
- Label: Open Road
- Producer: Matt Rovey

Dean Brody chronology
Trail in Life (2010)	Dirt (2012)	Crop Circles (2013)

Singles from Dirt
- 1. "Canadian Girls" Released: January 30, 2012; 2. "Bob Marley" Released: May 21, 2012; 3. "It's Friday" Released: September 7, 2012; 4. "Underneath the Apple Trees" Released: January 8, 2013; 5. "Dirt" Released: May 2013

Dirt is the third studio album by Canadian country music artist Dean Brody. It was released on April 24, 2012 via Open Road Recordings under the production of Matt Rovey. Its first single, "Canadian Girls," peaked at number 36 on the Canadian Hot 100 in February 2012.

Dirt was nominated for Country Album of the Year at the 2013 Juno Awards.

== Track listing ==
All tracks are written by Dean Brody, except where noted.

No.	Title	Writer(s)	Length
1.	"Dirt"	Brody; Marty Dodson; Jimmy Yeary	3:16
2.	"It's Friday" (featuring Great Big Sea)		3:11
3.	"Underneath the Apple Trees"		3:31
4.	"Rural Route #3"		4:11
5.	"Canadian Girls"		3:56
6.	"Flowers in Her Hands"		3:36
7.	"The Sleeping Bag Song"	Brody; George Canyon	3:19
8.	"That's Your Cousin"		3:24
9.	"Bob Marley Prelude"		0:27
10.	"Bob Marley"		3:27
11.	"Losing My Balance"		3:36
12.	"Nowhere USA"		4:27
Total length:			40:21

== Chart performance ==
=== Album ===
Chart (2012)	Peak position
Canadian Albums (Billboard)	12

=== Singles ===
Year	Single	Peak chart positions	
Year	Single	CAN Country	CAN
2012	"Canadian Girls"	1	36
2012	"Bob Marley"	3	69
2012	"It's Friday"	7	60
2013	"Underneath the Apple Trees"	12	84
2013	"Dirt"	9	81
"—" denotes releases that did not chart

== Certifications ==
Region	Certification
Canada (Music Canada)	Platinum
