= Bounty (song) =

Single by Dean Brody

from the album Crop Circles
- Released: August 19, 2013
- Genre: Country
- Length: 4:12
- Label: Open Road
- Songwriter(s): Dean Brody
- Producer(s): Matt Rovey

Dean Brody singles chronology
"Dirt" (2013)	"Bounty" (2013)	"Crop Circles" (2013)

"Bounty" is a song recorded by Canadian country music artist Dean Brody. It was released in August 2013 as the first single from his fourth studio album, Crop Circles. The song features guest vocals from Lindi Ortega.

== Critical reception ==
Shenieka Russell-Metcalf of Top Country wrote that "the catchy –western style song and music video captivate you with a great story and perfect vocals from both artists."

== Music video ==
The music video was directed by Margaret Malandruccolo and premiered in September 2013.

== Chart performance ==
"Bounty" debuted at number 95 on the Canadian Hot 100 for the week of September 21, 2013, and later peaked at number 46. It became a Number One hit on the Billboard Canada Country chart for the week dated December 7, 2013.

Chart (2013)	Peak position
Canada (Canadian Hot 100)	46
Canada Country (Billboard)	1

== Certifications ==
Region	Certification
Canada (Music Canada)	Platinum
