= Canadian Girls =

Single by Dean Brody

from the album Dirt
- Released: January 30, 2012
- Genre: Country
- Length: 3:56
- Label: Open Road
- Songwriter: Dean Brody
- Producer: Matt Rovey

Dean Brody singles chronology
"Little Yellow Blanket" (2011)	"Canadian Girls" (2012)	"Bob Marley" (2012)

"Canadian Girls" is a song written and recorded by Canadian country music artist Dean Brody. It was released in January 2012 as the first single from his album Dirt. The song reached No. 36 on the Canadian Hot 100 in February 2012.

== Critical reception ==
Stephen Cooke of the Halifax Chronicle-Herald calls the song, "a honky-tonk rebuttal to the Beach Boys' ode to women from The Golden State." He goes on to say that the chorus, "drills its way into your head as the singer praises anyone of the opposite sex who can fire up a woodstove, sing along to Gordon Lightfoot and look sexy in a tuque."

== Music video ==
The music video was directed by Christopher Mills and premiered in February 2012.

== Chart performance ==
"Canadian Girls" debuted at number 36 on the Canadian Hot 100 for the week of February 25, 2012.

Chart (2012)	Peak position
Canada Hot 100 (Billboard)	36
Canada Country (Billboard)	1

== Certifications ==
Region	Certification	Certified units/sales
Canada (Music Canada)	2× Platinum	160,000^{‡}
^{‡} Sales+streaming figures based on certification alone.
