= Redferrin =

- Born: Blake Redferrin; November 25, 1992 (age 33)
- Origin: White House, Tennessee
- Genre: Country
- Years active: 2021–present
- Labels: Warner Music Nashville; Round Here Records
- Website: www.redferrin.com

Blake Redferrin (known simply as Redferrin) is an American country singer-songwriter.

== Biography ==
Redferrin is originally from White House, Tennessee and began his career racing dirt bikes on the Arenacross circuit. After an injury ended his career, he began writing music for Florida Georgia Line, leading to songs such as "Lil Bit" and "Countryside." He co-wrote The Reklaws 2023 single "Honky Tonkin' About" which peaked at No. 1 on the Billboard Canadian Country charts and won Vocal Collaboration of the Year at the 2024 Canadian Country Music Awards.

Redferrin received RIAA Gold certification for his single "Jack and Diet Coke" in 2024. The same year, he first charted with his EP Old No. 7 which entered the Billboard Heatseekers charts at No. 24.

== Discography ==
=== Albums ===
Title	EP details
Been There Done That	Release date: June 12, 2026; Label: Warner Music Nashville; Formats: Digital, CD

=== Extended plays ===
Title	EP details
Old No. 7	Release date: February 1, 2024; Label: Warner Music Nashville; Formats: Digital, CD
Some City, Somewhere	Release date: January 27, 2025; Label: Warner Music Nashville; Formats: Digital, CD

=== Singles ===
Year	Title	Peak chart positions			Certifications	Album
Year	Title	US	US Country	US Country Airplay	Certifications	Album
2021	"Red In My Last Name"	—	—	—		non-album single
2023	"Jack and Diet Coke"	—	—	—	RIAA: Platinum; MC: Gold	Old No. 7
2024	"Just Like Johnny"	— (Note: "Just Like Johnny" did not enter the Billboard Hot 100, but peaked at number 11 on the Bubbling Under Hot 100 chart.)	28	58	RIAA: Platinum; MC: Gold	Old No. 7

==== As writer / co-writer ====
- "Can't Help Myself"
- "Honky Tonkin' About"
- "Lil Bit"
- "Where'd You Learn How to Do That"
