= Dean Brody =

Canadian country music artist (born 1975)

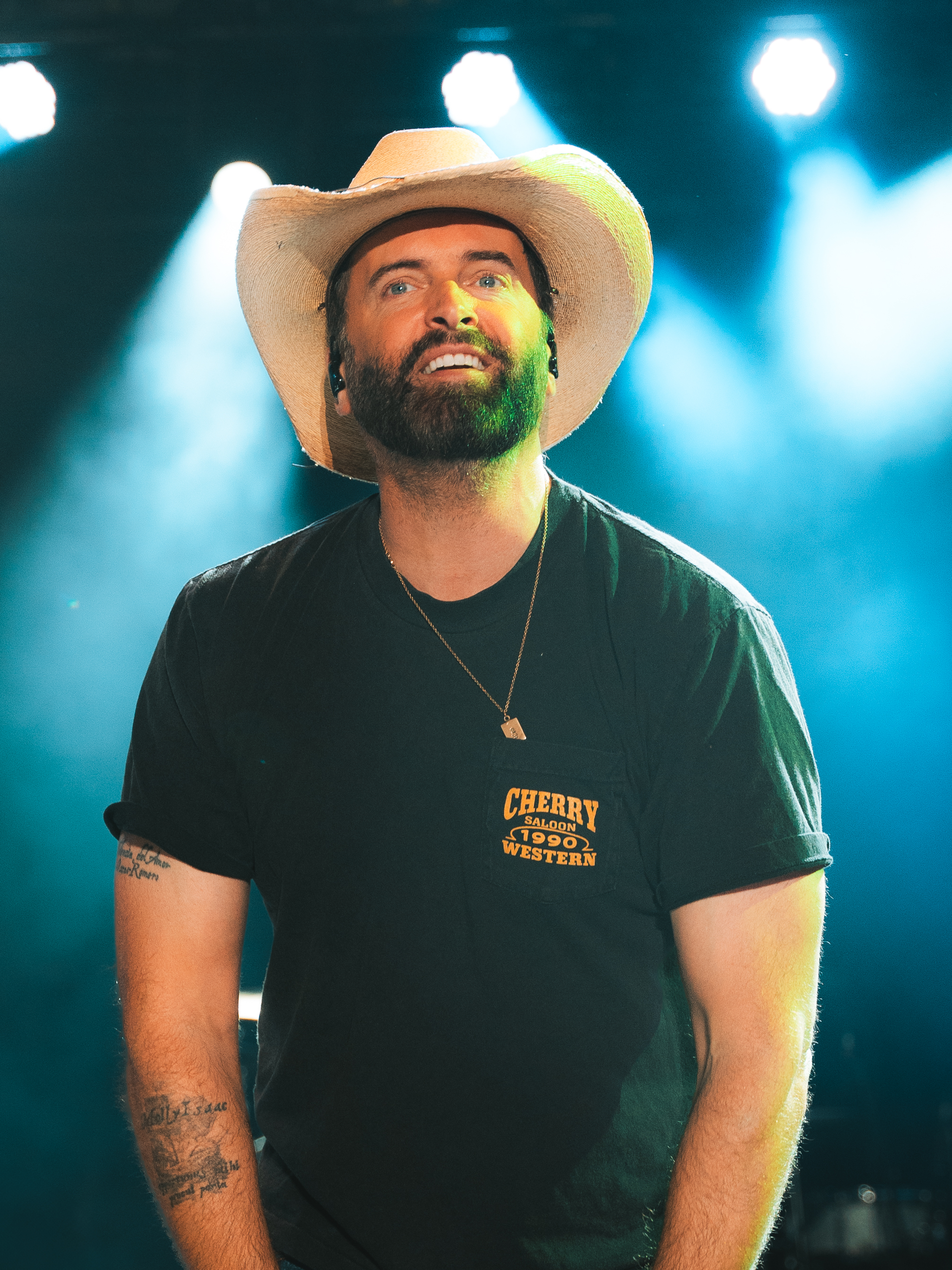
- Brody performing at the CNE in Toronto, Ontario on August 30th 2025

Background information
- Born: August 12, 1975 (age 51); Smithers, British Columbia, Canada
- Origin: Jaffray, British Columbia, Canada
- Genre: Country
- Occupation: Singer-songwriter
- Instruments: Vocals, acoustic guitar
- Years active: 2004–present
- Labels: Starseed; Scurvy Dog; Open Road; Broken Bow

Dean Brody (born August 12, 1975) is a Canadian country music artist from British Columbia. He has won 16 CCMA Awards and 2 JUNO Awards.

Originally signed to Broken Bow Records in 2008, Brody made his debut later that year with the single "Brothers". This song, a Top 40 country hit in the US, was the first single from his self-titled debut album, released in 2009 under the production of Matt Rovey. In 2010, Brody was signed to Open Road Recordings and released his second album, Trail in Life. In 2012, he released his third album, Dirt, earning the 2012 CCMA Album of the Year award and a 2013 Juno nomination for Country Album of the Year. Brody also won the 2012 and 2013 CCMA Male Artist of the Year award. Brody's fourth album, Crop Circles, was released in 2013. Brody's fifth album, Gypsy Road, was released in 2015. Brody's sixth album, Beautiful Freakshow, was released in 2016, and he subsequently earned the singer 3 Awards at the 2017 CCMA Awards show, including Fan's Choice, Songwriter of the Year and Top-Selling Canadian Single of the Year for "Bush Party". In 2020, Brody landed the record for the most played song ever in a single week at Canadian country radio with "Canadian Summer", which was included on his seventh album Boys. He is the only Canadian country artist to have headlined the Budweiser Stage in Toronto for six consecutive years.

== Biography ==
Brody was born in Smithers, British Columbia and grew up in Jaffray, British Columbia. As a boy, Brody worked at a sawmill, also playing guitar in his spare time. By 2004, he had moved to Nashville, Tennessee to pursue his musical career. Although he found a songwriting contract, the expiration of his US work permit forced him to move back to Canada. Eventually, he returned to Nashville through the suggestion of producer Keith Stegall, who helped him sign with Broken Bow Records in 2008. Brody released his debut single, "Brothers", late that year. Shortly before its release, Brody was injured in a waterskiing accident on the Potomac River and had to undergo extensive reconstructive surgery. Brody lived in Windsor, Nova Scotia and Chester, Nova Scotia from 2010 to 2017. In 2020, he launched his own beer, "Hucklejack Canadian Lager". Brody has run the "Dean Brody Foundation", which supports global initiatives, since the early 2010s.

== Music career ==
=== 2009–2011: Dean Brody and Trail in Life ===
Brody's self-titled debut album was released in the United States on April 28, 2009, via the independent label Broken Bow Records. The album debuted at Number 32 on the U.S. Billboard Top Country Albums chart, and was released in Canada on May 12, 2009. "Brothers" peaked at number 26 in the US. "Dirt Road Scholar" and "Undone" were both released in Canada and "Gravity" in the United States.

The first single from Brody's second album, "Wildflower", was released in April 2010. A second single, "Roll That Barrel Out", was released in July 2010. The album, Trail in Life, was released by Open Road Recordings in August 2010. Other singles included the title track, "People Know You by Your First Name" and "Little Yellow Blanket".

=== 2012–2014: Dirt and Crop Circles ===
Brody's third studio album, Dirt, was released by Open Road Recordings on April 24, 2012. Its first single, "Canadian Girls", became Brody's first song to reach the top 40 on the Canadian Hot 100 and his first certified gold digital single. Brody sold out his first headline Dirt Tour across Canada in 2012.

Brody's fourth studio album, Crop Circles, was released on November 5, 2013. The lead single, "Bounty", was released on August 19. It was followed by the title track in December 2013, "Another Man's Gold" in April 2014 and "Mountain Man" in September 2014.

=== 2015–2017: Gypsy Road and Beautiful Freakshow ===
Brody's fifth studio album, Gypsy Road, was released on April 21, 2015. The lead single, "Upside Down", was released on February 9. The album's second single, "Bring Down the House", was released to Canadian country radio on May 25, 2015. The album's third single, "Love Would Be Enough", was released to Canadian country radio on October 23, 2015. The album's fourth single, "Monterey", was released to Canadian country radio in March 2016.

Brody's sixth studio album, Beautiful Freakshow, was released on October 21, 2016. The album's lead single, "Bush Party" released to Canadian country radio on 2016, and was certified Platinum by Music Canada. The album also included Brody's third number one hit "8th Day", as well as the Platinum-certified "Beautiful Freakshow" and Gold-certified "Time". In 2017, Brody headlined the Budweiser Stage in Toronto, Ontario for the first time.

=== 2018–2019: Black Sheep ===
On April 26, 2019, Brody released the EP Black Sheep, which featured four singles, "Good Goodbye", "Dose of Country", the platinum-certified "Whiskey in a Teacup", and "Black Sheep", all of which charted in the top ten of the Canadian Country charts. Later that year, he co-headlined a tour across Canada with fellow Canadian country artist Dallas Smith.

=== 2020–2021: Boys ===
In February 2020, Brody independently released the single "Can't Help Myself" with The Reklaws through his own label, Scurvy Dog Music. The song reached No. 1 on the Billboard Canada Country chart and No. 49 on the Canadian Hot 100. It was officially the most played song ever at Canadian country radio in a single week on the Nielsen BDS charts with 1782 spins. In June 2020, Brody released the single "Canadian Summer". It would become his second consecutive No. 1 at Canadian Country radio, and fifth overall, while breaking the previous record at Canadian country radio set by "Can't Help Myself" with 1817 spins.

Brody released his seventh album, Boys on November 18, 2020. The title track "Boys" was released as the third single to country radio off the album and featured American country singer Mickey Guyton. The song would also reach #1 on the Canada Country chart. "Lightning Bug" was released to radio as the fourth single off the album in April 2021. Brody then collaborated with fellow Canadian country artist Jade Eagleson on "More Drinkin' Than Fishin'", and released "I'd Go to Jail" as the fifth single from Boys.

=== 2022–present: Right Round Here and The Tenth Album ===
In May 2022, he released the new single "Where'd You Learn How to Do That". The song would go on to become Brody's eight number one in Canada, and he followed it up with the release of "You Got the Wrong Guy" in October 2022. In April 2023, he released the single "Broke", which will be included on his ninth studio album, slated for release in the fall of 2023. In July 2023, Canadian Country Music Association announced that Brody would receive "Gary Slaight Music Humanitarian Award" for his contributions and achievements through his Dean Brody Foundation.

In September 2023, Brody released his eighth album Right Round Here, which includes his previous singles from 2022 and 2023. He embarked on the acoustic "Right Round Here" Tour across Canada to support the album in the fall of 2023. In 2024, Brody released the single "Your Mama Would Hate Me" with the James Barker Band.

In June 2025, Brody released the single "Drink Around". On June 26, 2026, he released The Tenth Album (Side A), the first of a two-part album. Brody is set to embark on the "Hometown Heroes Tour" across Canada in the late summer and fall of 2026, co-headlining alongside The Reklaws.

== Discography ==
- Dean Brody (2009)
- Trail in Life (2010)
- Dirt (2012)
- Crop Circles (2013)
- Gypsy Road (2015)
- Beautiful Freakshow (2016)
- Black Sheep (2019)
- Boys (2020)
- Right Round Here (2023)

== Awards and nominations ==
Year	Association	Category	Result
2009	Canadian Country Music Association	Single of the Year – "Brothers"	Won
2009	Canadian Country Music Association	Songwriter of the Year – "Brothers"	Nominated
2009	Canadian Country Music Association	CMT Video of the Year – "Brothers"	Nominated
2009	Canadian Country Music Association	Rising Star	Nominated
2010	Canadian Country Music Association	Male Artist of the Year	Nominated
2010	Canadian Country Music Association	Album of the Year – Dean Brody	Nominated
2010	Canadian Country Music Association	Single of the Year – "Dirt Road Scholar"	Nominated
2010	Canadian Country Music Association	Songwriter of the Year – "Dirt Road Scholar"	Nominated
2010	Canadian Country Music Association	CMT Video of the Year – "Wildflower"	Nominated
2011	Juno Awards of 2011	Country Album of the Year – Trail in Life	Nominated
2011	Canadian Country Music Association	Fans' Choice Award	Nominated
2011	Canadian Country Music Association	Male Artist of the Year	Nominated
2011	Canadian Country Music Association	Album of the Year – Trail in Life	Won
2011	Canadian Country Music Association	Single of the Year – "Trail in Life"	Won
2011	Canadian Country Music Association	Songwriter of the Year – "Trail in Life"	Won
2012	Canadian Country Music Association	Fans' Choice Award	Nominated
2012	Canadian Country Music Association	Male Artist of the Year	Won
2012	Canadian Country Music Association	Album of the Year – Dirt	Won
2012	Canadian Country Music Association	Single of the Year – "Canadian Girls"	Nominated
2012	Canadian Country Music Association	Songwriter of the Year – "Canadian Girls"	Nominated
2012	Canadian Country Music Association	CMT Video of the Year – "Canadian Girls"	Nominated
2012	Canadian Country Music Association	Interactive Artist of the Year	Nominated
2013	Juno Awards of 2013	Country Album of the Year – Dirt	Nominated
2013	Canadian Country Music Association	Fans' Choice Award	Nominated
2013	Canadian Country Music Association	Male Artist of the Year	Won
2013	Canadian Country Music Association	Single of the Year – "It's Friday"	Nominated
2013	Canadian Country Music Association	Songwriter of the Year – "Bob Marley"	Nominated
2013	Canadian Country Music Association	Songwriter of the Year – "It's Friday"	Nominated
2013	Canadian Country Music Association	CMT Video of the Year – "I'm Movin' On"	Nominated
2014	Juno Awards of 2014	Country Album of the Year – Crop Circles	Won
2014	Canadian Country Music Association	Fans' Choice Award	Nominated
2014	Canadian Country Music Association	Male Artist of the Year	Nominated
2014	Canadian Country Music Association	Album of the Year – Crop Circles	Won
2014	Canadian Country Music Association	Single of the Year – "Bounty"	Nominated
2014	Canadian Country Music Association	Songwriter of the Year – "Bounty"	Nominated
2014	Canadian Country Music Association	CMT Video of the Year – "Bounty"	Nominated
2015	Canadian Country Music Association	Fans' Choice Award	Nominated
2015	Canadian Country Music Association	Male Artist of the Year	Nominated
2015	Canadian Country Music Association	Album of the Year – Gypsy Road	Nominated
2015	Canadian Country Music Association	Single of the Year – "Another Man's Gold"	Nominated
2015	Canadian Country Music Association	Songwriter of the Year – "Upside Down"	Nominated
2015	Canadian Country Music Association	Video of the Year – "Upside Down"	Won
2016	Juno Awards of 2016	Juno Fan Choice Award	Nominated
2016	Juno Awards of 2016	Country Album of the Year – Gypsy Road	Won
2017	Canadian Country Music Association	Fan's Choice Award	Won
2017	Canadian Country Music Association	Songwriter of the Year - "Time"	Won
2019	Canadian Country Music Association	Male Artist of the Year	Nominated
2019	Canadian Country Music Association	Entertainer of the Year	Nominated
2019	Canadian Country Music Association	Fans' Choice Award	Nominated
2020	Juno Awards of 2020	Country Album of the Year – Black Sheep	Nominated
2020	Canadian Country Music Association	Album Of The Year – Black Sheep	Nominated
2020	Canadian Country Music Association	Entertainer Of The Year	Nominated
2020	Canadian Country Music Association	Fans’ Choice Award	Nominated
2020	Canadian Country Music Association	Male Artist Of The Year	Nominated
2020	Canadian Country Music Association	Single Of The Year - "Whiskey In A Teacup"	Nominated
2021	2021 Canadian Country Music Awards	Entertainer of the Year	Nominated
2021	2021 Canadian Country Music Awards	Fans’ Choice Award	Nominated
2021	2021 Canadian Country Music Awards	Male Artist of the Year	Nominated
2021	2021 Canadian Country Music Awards	Single of the Year - "Can't Help Myself"	Nominated
2022	Juno Awards of 2022	Country Album of the Year – Boys	Nominated
2022	Canadian Country Music Association	Fans' Choice	Nominated
2022	Canadian Country Music Association	Male Artist of the Year	Nominated
2022	Canadian Country Music Association	Single of the Year - "More Drinkin' Than Fishin'" (with Jade Eagleson)	Nominated
2022	Canadian Country Music Association	Music Video of the Year - "More Drinkin' Than Fishin'" (with Jade Eagleson)	Nominated
2023	Canadian Country Music Association	Entertainer of the Year	Nominated
2023	Canadian Country Music Association	Fans' Choice	Nominated
2023	Canadian Country Music Association	Gary Slaight Music Humanitarian Award	Won
2023	Canadian Country Music Association	Male Artist of the Year	Nominated
2023	Canadian Country Music Association	Single of the Year - "Where'd You Learn How to Do That"	Nominated
2024	Juno Awards	Country Album of the Year - Right Round Here	Nominated
2024	Canadian Country Music Association	Fans' Choice	Nominated
2024	Canadian Country Music Association	Innovative Campaign of the Year - Right Round Here Album Setup & Release Campaign, "Right Round Here Tour"	Nominated
2024	Canadian Country Music Association	Male Artist of the Year	Nominated
2025	Juno Awards	Juno Fan Choice	Nominated
2025	Canadian Country Music Association	Musical Collaboration of the Year - "Your Mama Would Hate Me" (with James Barker Band )	Nominated
