= Mickey Guyton discography =

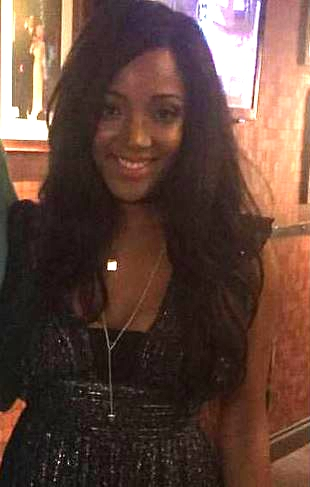
- Mickey Guyton, 2016.
- Studio albums: 2
- EPs: 4
- Singles: 10
- Music videos: 9
- Other charted songs: 1
- Promotional singles: 17
- Other appearances: 2

The discography of American country music artist Mickey Guyton contains two studio albums, four extended plays, ten singles, 17 promotional singles, one additionally-charting song, nine music videos and two album appearances.

Through Capitol Records Nashville, Guyton released her debut extended play in 2014 titled Unbreakable. It charted at number 14 on the Billboard Top Heatseekers survey shortly after its debut. In 2015, the label issued her first single, "Better Than You Left Me". The song was her first to reach the Billboard Hot Country Songs chart, where it peaked in the top 40. It also reached a similar position on Billboard's Canada Country chart. It was subsequently followed by Guyton's self-titled second EP was also released in 2015. The EP peaked at number 15 on the Top Heatseekers chart.

In 2016, Capitol Nashville issued her follow-up single titled "Heartbreak Song", which peaked outside the country top 40. Over the next several years, Guyton released several singles including "Sister" and "Crazy". Her first single following this re-emergence was 2020's "What Are You Gonna Tell Her?". This was followed by "Black Like Me". The song later received airplay on the Billboard adult contemporary chart where it reached a top 30 position. In September 2020, Guyton released her third EP titled Bridges. The EP reached the top 25 of the Heatseekers chart.

She then recorded "Boys" with Dean Brody, which reached number one on the Canada Country chart, giving Guyton her first number one (and top 10) on any chart. Her debut album, Remember Her Name, was released on September 24, 2021. The album was her first to reach the Billboard Top Country Albums list, peaking at the number 47 position. It also reached the top ten of the Heatseekers album list. In 2022, Capitol issued several promotional singles and was followed in 2023 by her next radio single called "Nothing Compares to You".

== Studio albums ==
List of albums, with selected chart positions, showing other relevant details
Title	Album details	Peak chart positions	
Title	Album details	US Cou.	US Hea.
Remember Her Name	Released: September 24, 2021; Label: Capitol Nashville; Formats: CD, music download, streaming	47	7
House on Fire	Released: September 27, 2024; Label: Capitol Nashville; Formats: Music download, streaming	—	—
"—" denotes a recording that did not chart or was not released in that territory.

== Extended plays ==
List of EPs, with selected chart positions, showing other relevant details
Title	EP details	Peak chart positions
Title	EP details	US Heat.
Unbreakable	Released: January 1, 2014; Label: Capitol Nashville; Formats: Music download	14
Mickey Guyton	Released: May 26, 2015; Label: Capitol Nashville; Formats: Music download	17
Bridges	Released: September 11, 2020; Label: Capitol Nashville; Formats: Music download, streaming	23
Mickey Guyton	Released: March 12, 2021; Label: Capitol Nashville; Formats: Music download, streaming	—
"—" denotes a recording that did not chart or was not released in that territory.

== Singles ==
=== As lead artist ===
List of singles, with selected chart positions, showing other relevant details
Title	Year	Peak chart positions			Sales	Album
Title	Year	US Cou. Air.	US AC	CAN Cou.	Sales	Album
"Better Than You Left Me"	2015	34	—	42	US: 145,000	Mickey Guyton
"Heartbreak Song"	2016	45	—	—		Non-album singles
"Nice Things"	2017	—	—	—		Non-album singles
"Sister"	2019	—	—	—		Non-album singles
"What Are You Gonna Tell Her?"	2020	— (Note: "What Are You Gonna Tell Her?" did not enter Billboard Country Airplay, but peaked at number 18 on the Country Digital Song Sales chart.)	—	—		Bridges
"Black Like Me"	2020	— (Note: "Black Like Me" did not enter Billboard Country Airplay, but peaked at number 4 on the Country Digital Song Sales chart.)	27	—		Bridges
"Heaven Down Here"	2020	—	—	—		Bridges
"Nothing Compares to You" (featuring Kane Brown)	2023	—	—	—		House on Fire
"—" denotes a recording that did not chart or was not released in that territory.

=== As a featured artist ===
List of singles, with selected chart positions, showing other relevant details
Title	Year	Peak chart positions		Certifications	Album
Title	Year	CAN	CAN Cou.	Certifications	Album
"Boys" (Dean Brody with Mickey Guyton)	2020	65	1	MC: Gold	Boys
"Cross Country" (Breland featuring Mickey Guyton)	2021	—	—		Cross Country
"Middle Ground" (Maroon 5 featuring Mickey Guyton)	2023	—	—		Non-album single
"Home Movies" (Lukas Graham with Mickey Guyton)	2023	—	—		4 (The Pink Album)
"Never Not Care" (Steven Lee Olsen featuring Mickey Guyton)	2024	—	24		Non-album single
"—" denotes a recording that did not chart or was not released in that territory.

=== Promotional singles ===
List of singles, with selected chart positions, showing other relevant details
Title	Year	Peak chart positions	Album
Title	Year	US Country Airplay	Album
"Do You Want to Build a Snowman?"	2015	57	Non-album singles
"Sister" (acoustic)	2019	—	Non-album singles
"Crazy"	2019	—	Non-album singles
"Without a Net"	2020	—	Stuntwomen: The Untold Hollywood Story
"O Holy Night"	2020	—	Non-album single
"Nothing Else Matters"	2021	—	The Metallica Blacklist
"Remember Her Name"	2021	—	Remember Her Name
"If I Were a Boy"	2021	—	Remember Her Name
"All American"	2021	—	Remember Her Name
"Love My Hair"	2021	—	Remember Her Name
"Have a Little Faith in Me"	2021	—	Non-album singles
"Somethin' Bout You"	2022	—	Non-album singles
"How You Love Someone"	2022	—	Non-album singles
"I Still Pray"	2022	—	Non-album singles
"Woman"	2024	—	Non-album singles
"Scary Love"	2024	—	House on Fire
"Make It Me"	2024	—	House on Fire
"—" denotes a recording that did not chart or was not released in that territory.

== Other charted songs ==
List of songs, with selected chart positions, showing other relevant details
Title	Year	Peak chart positions	Album
Title	Year	US Country Songs	Album
"Why Baby Why"	2016	45	Mickey Guyton

== Music videos ==
List of music videos, showing year released and director
Title	Year	Director(s)	Ref.
"Better Than You Left Me"	2015	Peter Zavadil	
"Do You Want to Build a Snowman?"	2015	Justin Key	
"Heartbreak Song"	2016	Shane Drake	
"Sister"	2019	Chelsea Thompson	
"Heaven Down Here"	2020	Sarah McColgan	
"Without a Net"	2020	Gabriel Gely	
"Remember Her Name"	2021	Alexa and Stephen Kinigopoulos	
"Nothing Compares to You" (with Kane Brown)	2023	Alex Alvga	
"Woman"	2024	Christen Pinkston and Wesley Stebbins-Perry	
"House on Fire"	2024	Alex Alvga	

== Other album appearances ==
List of non-single guest appearances, with other performing artists, showing year released and album name
Title	Year	Other artist(s)	Album	Ref.
"Caught Up In Your Storm"	2018	—N/a	Forever My Girl (soundtrack)	
"Hold On"	2019	—N/a	Breakthrough (soundtrack)	
"Drunk & I Miss You"	2020	Jimmie Allen	Bettie James	
