= 2021 CMT Music Awards =

Annual US country music awards ceremony

- Date: June 9, 2021
- Location: Nashville, Tennessee
- Hosted by: Kelsea Ballerini; Kane Brown

Highlights
- Most wins: Kane Brown (2)
- Most nominations: Kane Brown (4)

Television/radio coverage
- Network: CMT, MTV, MTV2, Logo, Paramount Network, TV Land
- Viewership: 0.82 million

The 2021 CMT Music Awards, the 55th edition of the awards ceremony, were held in Nashville, Tennessee on June 9, 2021. Kane Brown and Kelsea Ballerini were hosts of the ceremony.

== Background ==
The CMT Music Awards are a fan-voted awards show for country music videos and television performances; Voting takes place on CMT's website. The CMT Music Awards is the oldest MTV awards show, dating its history to the 1967 Music City News Awards. MTV acquired the awards show in 2000. This was the second time the on Duo/Group Video of the Year category has been combined since 2016.

=== Linda Martell ===
One of the pioneers for Black acts in country music and the first Black woman to perform solo at the Grand Ole Opry, Linda Martell, was honored at the 2021 CMT Music Awards with the CMT Equal Play Award. The CMT Equal Play Award is a commitment to feature more diverse voices from historically marginalized artists, like Martell. The award was presented by Mickey Guyton and featured video messages from Darius Rucker, Rissi Palmer and Rhiannon Giddens.

== Winners and nominees ==
Winners are shown in bold.

Video of the Year	Female Video of the Year
**Carrie Underwood** with **John Legend** — **"Hallelujah"**; Kane Brown — "Worldwide Beautiful"; Keith Urban and Pink — "One Too Many"; Kelsea Ballerini — "Hole in the Bottle"	**Gabby Barrett** — **"The Good Ones"**; Carly Pearce — "Next Girl"; Kelsea Ballerini — "Hole in the Bottle"; Maren Morris — "To Hell & Back"; Mickey Guyton — "Heaven Down Here"; Miranda Lambert — "Settling Down"
Male Video of the Year	Duo/Group Video of the Year
**Kane Brown** — **"Worship You"**; Chris Stapleton — "Starting Over"; Darius Rucker — "Beers and Sunshine"; Luke Bryan — "Down to One"; Luke Combs — "Lovin' on You"; Thomas Rhett — "What's Your Country Song"	**Little Big Town** — **"Wine, Beer, Whiskey"**; Brothers Osborne — "All Night"; Lady A — "Like a Lady"; Old Dominion — "Never Be Sorry"; Parmalee and Blanco Brown — "Just the Way"; Runaway June — "We Were Rich"
Breakthrough Video of the Year	Collaborative Video of the Year
**Dylan Scott** — **"Nobody"**; Hailey Whitters and Little Big Town — "Fillin' My Cup"; Hardy — "Give Heaven Some Hell"; Lainey Wilson — "Things a Man Oughta Know"; Mickey Guyton — "Black Like Me"; Niko Moon — "Good Time" (Ride Along Video)	**Chris Young** and **Kane Brown** — **"Famous Friends"**; Carrie Underwood with John Legend — "Hallelujah"; Elle King and Miranda Lambert — "Drunk (And I Don't Wanna Go Home)"; Keith Urban and Pink — "One Too Many"; Ryan Hurd with Maren Morris — "Chasing After You"; Tim McGraw and Tyler Hubbard — "Undivided"
CMT Performance of the Year	Best Family Feature
**From the 2020 CMT Music Awards**: **Kelsea Ballerini** and **Halsey** — **"The Other Girl"**; From the 2020 CMT Music Awards: Brooks & Dunn and Luke Combs — "1, 2 Many"; From the 2020 CMT Music Awards: Dan + Shay — "I Should Probably Go to Bed"; From the 2020 CMT Music Awards: Jimmie Allen and Noah Cyrus — "This Is Us"; From the 2020 CMT Music Awards: Little Big Town — "Wine, Beer, Whiskey"; From CMT Crossroads: Nathaniel Rateliff and Margo Price — "Twinkle Twinkle"	**Taylor Swift** — **"The Best Day (Taylor's Version)"**; Brooke Eden — "Sunroof"; Kane Brown — "Worship You"; Luke Combs — "Forever After All"; Miranda Lambert — "Settling Down"; Russell Dickerson — "Home Sweet"; Ryan Hurd and Maren Morris — "Chasing After You"
CMT Equal Play Award
**Linda Martell**

== Performers ==
On May 26, CMT announced some performers for the 2021 CMT Music Awards. The final performers were announced on June 7. Maren Morris and Gabby Barrett were previously announced as performers but both backed out; the former was replaced by Ingrid Andress and the latter by Lindsay Ell.

Performer(s)	Song
Lady A Carly Pearce; Lindsay Ell; The Shindellas	"Like a Lady"
H.E.R. Chris Stapleton	"Hold On"
Ingrid Andress; JP Saxe	"Lady Like" "Like That”
Breland; Mickey Guyton	"Cross Country"
Brothers Osborne; Dierks Bentley	"Lighten Up"
Carrie Underwood; Needtobreathe	"I Wanna Remember"
Chris Young; Kane Brown	"Famous Friends"
Chris Stapleton	"Arkansas"
Kelsea Ballerini; Paul Klein	"I Quit Drinking"
Lauren Alaina; Jon Pardi	"Getting Over Him"
Luke Bryan	"Down to One"
Luke Combs	"Cold as You"
Mickey Guyton; Gladys Knight	"Friendship Train"
Miranda Lambert; Jack Ingram; Jon Randall	"Tequila Does"
Thomas Rhett	"Country Again"
Blanco Brown	"Nobody's More Country"
Dylan Scott	"Nobody"
Hailey Whitters	"Fillin' My Cup"
Lainey Wilson	"Things a Man Oughta Know"
Niko Moon	"Good Time"
Tenille Arts	"Somebody Like That"

== Presenters ==
The following have been announced as presenters for the ceremony:

- Anthony Mackie
- Brett Young
- Busy Philipps
- Carly Pearce
- Dylan Scott
- Gladys Knight
- Iliza Shlesinger
- Little Big Town
- Michael Strahan
- Mickey Guyton
- Restless Road
- Trace Adkins
- Taylor Lewan
- Cody Alan, Katie Cook and Ashley ShahAhmadi
