= Hillary Lindsey =

American singer-songwriter

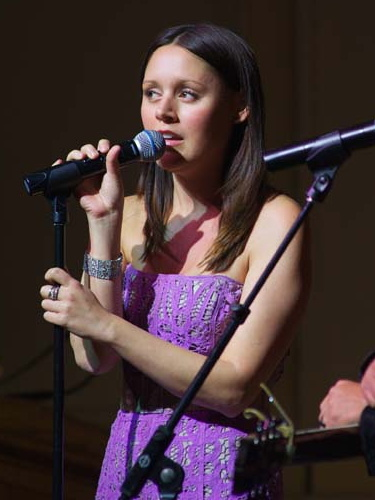
- Lindsey performing at the 2011 ASCAP concert

Background information
- Born: Hillary Lee Lindsey; August 11, 1977 (age 49); Washington, Georgia, U.S.
- Genre: Country
- Occupations: Singer; songwriter
- Years active: 1996–present
- Website: www.facebook.com/HillaryLindseyFans

Hillary Lee Lindsey (born August 11, 1977) is an American singer-songwriter. She has written songs with or for a number of artists including Michelle Branch, Faith Hill, Martina McBride, Shakira, Lady A, Gary Allan, Sara Evans, Carrie Underwood, Kellie Pickler, Bon Jovi, Taylor Swift, Lady Gaga, Tim McGraw and Luke Bryan. In 2006 and 2016, respectively, Lindsey won two Grammy Awards for Best Country Song for Carrie Underwood's "Jesus, Take the Wheel" and for Little Big Town's "Girl Crush". In 2011, Lindsey received an Academy Award nomination for "Coming Home", recorded by Gwyneth Paltrow for the soundtrack of Country Strong, in the Best Original Song category. "Coming Home" also received a Golden Globe nomination that same year for Best Original Song along with "There's a Place for Us", making Lindsey a double nominee in 2011. As of 2018, she has had 20 number-one singles as a writer. She won her third Grammy Award for the song "I'll Never Love Again" from the soundtrack of the 2018 film A Star Is Born.

She has been nominated three times for the Grammy Award for Song of the Year for her work on "Jesus Take the Wheel", "Girl Crush", and "Always Remember Us This Way".

== Early life and education ==
Lindsey grew up in Washington, Georgia. She is the daughter of Ricky and Kathy Lindsey. Her father was a drummer.

She started writing songs at age two. She went on to sing in her church choir and won her first award at age eight in the local Kiwanis Talent Showcase. As a child, she won 4-H singing competitions and participated in 4-H's traveling performing arts group, Clovers & Co.

Lindsey graduated from Washington-Wilkes Comprehensive High School and moved to Nashville in 1994 to enroll in Belmont University’s Music Business School.

== Career ==
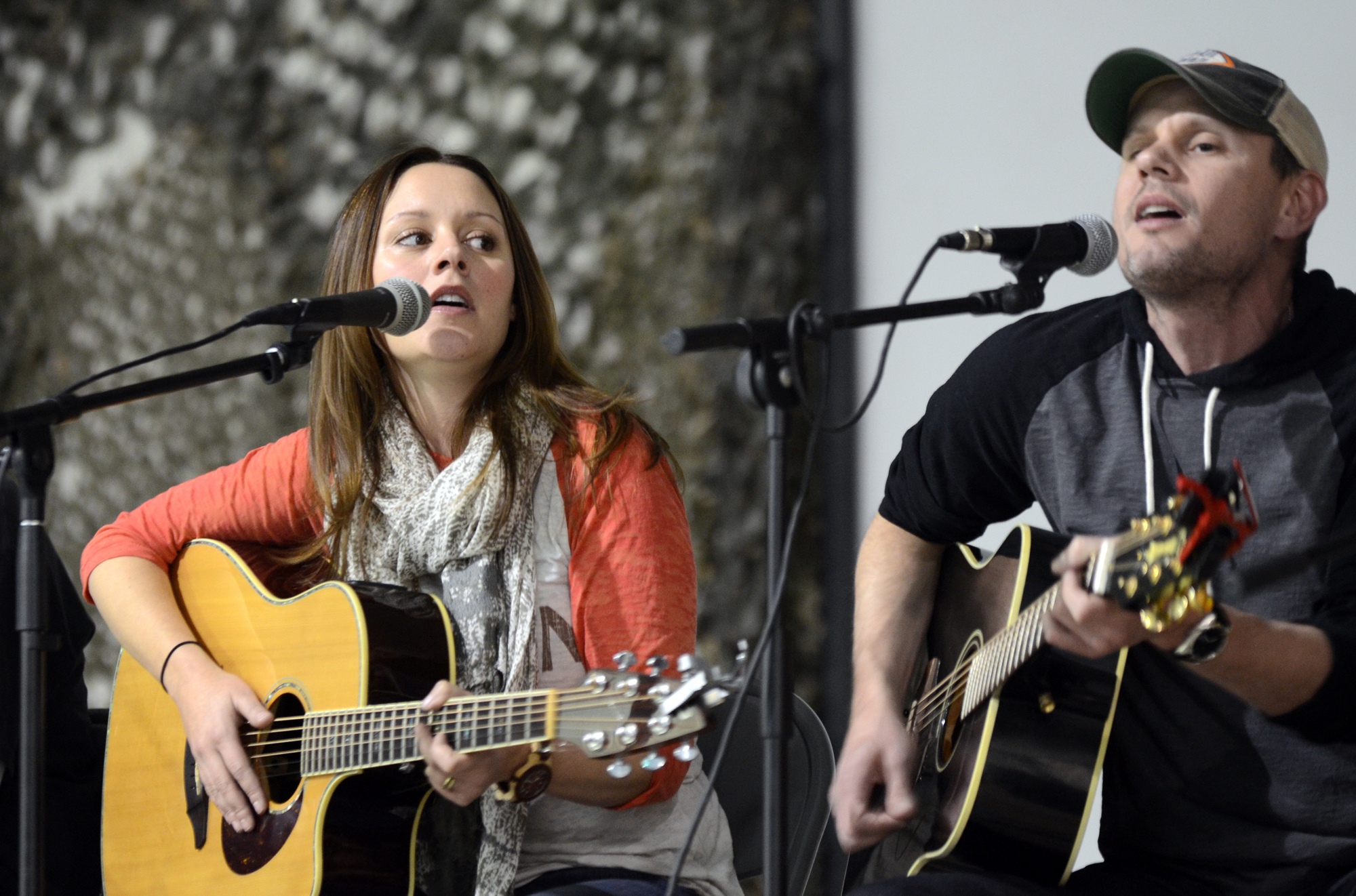
Hillary Lindsey and Troy Verges perform at Bagram Air Field, Afghanistan on Nov., 16, 2012

She landed a publishing deal during her senior year at Belmont University. She signed her first publishing deal in 1997. She was later signed as an artist to Sony Music but was dropped by the label after three months.

She tells the story of a roommate who had an internship at a record label and took one of her tapes into work with her. The tape was passed around to publishers, and Lindsey was quickly signed to Famous Music Publishing. In her first year as a writer she had eight cuts. She had her first number one song as a writer in 2002 with Martina McBride's "Blessed". In that same year, her song This Mystery (co-written by Troy Verges and Brett James) was a number one hit in the Netherlands for singer Marco Borsato in a Dutch translation titled Lopen op het Water ("Walking on water"). The Dutch translation was recorded for the marriage of then-crown prince Willem Alexander and Maxima Zorreguieta.

Eleven of her number ones as a writer are Carrie Underwood tracks including "Jesus Take The Wheel", "Wasted", "So Small", "Just A Dream", "Last Name" and "Two Black Cadillacs". Thirty million records have been sold featuring her compositions. She has had two songs featured on the ABC television series Nashville: "Telescope" performed by Hayden Panettiere and "Change Your Mind" performed by Clare Bowen and Sam Palladio.

In 2020, Lindsey was named Songwriter of the Year by the Academy of Country Music. She is only the second woman in history to receive that honor.

Lindsey's friendship with songwriters Lori McKenna and Liz Rose developed into a working partnership called the Love Junkies. The three have collaborated on songs for Little Big Town and Lady Gaga. The three shared a Grammy Award in 2015 for Girl Crush which won for "Best Country Song." In 2021, the three women launched a podcast titled "Love Junkies Radio." As of 2016, the three women had sold more than 50 million songs either together, separately or with others.

in 2020, Lindsey signed a co-publishing agreement with Concord Music Publishing. The partnership will include a joint venture to sign and develop new artists.

== Discography ==
Song written
Year	Artist	Album	Song	Co-written with
1998	Ilse DeLange	World of Hurt	"I'm Not So Tough"	Robert Ellis Orrall, Bruce Bouton
1999	Martina McBride	Emotion	"From the Ashes"	Austin Cunningham
2000	Sara Evans	Born to Fly	"Four-Thirty"	Bill Lloyd
2001	Jessica Andrews	Who I Am	"Every Time"	Tia Sillers
2001	Martina McBride	Greatest Hits	"Blessed"	Brett James, Troy Verges
2002	Faith Hill	Cry	"Stronger"	Troy Verges
2002	Faith Hill	Cry	"This Is Me"	Troy Verges
2003	Jessica Andrews	Now	"I Wish for You"	Aimee Mayo, Troy Verges
2003	Jessica Andrews	Now	"Never Be Forgotten"	Aimee Mayo, Chris Lindsey, Troy Verges
2003	Jessica Andrews	Now	"Windows on a Train"	Angelo Petraglia, Troy Verges
2003	Terri Clark	Pain to Kill	"Three Mississippi"	Troy Verges, Angelo Petraglia
2003	Sara Evans	Restless	"Backseat of a Greyhound Bus"	Chris Lindsey, Aimee Mayo, Troy Verges
2003	Sara Evans	Restless	"Ottis Redding"	Angelo Petraglia, Troy Verges
2003	Sara Evans	Restless	"Big Cry"	Brett James, Angelo Petraglia
2003	Wynonna Judd	What the World Needs Now Is Love	"(No One's Gonna) Break Me Down"	Brett James, Angelo Petraglia
2003	Martina McBride	Martina	"So Magical"	Brett James, Angelo Petraglia
2003	Martina McBride	Martina	"This One's for the Girls"	Aimee Mayo, Chris Lindsey
2003	Martina McBride	Martina	"When You Love Me"	Brett James, Angelo Petraglia
2003	Carolyn Dawn Johnson	Dress Rehearsal	"Simple Life"	Troy Verges, Aimee Mayo, Chris Lindsey
2004	Emerson Drive	What If?	"Lemonade"	Blair Daly, Troy Verges
2004	Rachel Proctor	Where I Belong	"Where I Belong"	Chris Lindsey, Aimee Mayo, Troy Verges
2005	Aaron Lines	Waitin' on the Wonderful	"Waitin' on the Wonderful"	Angelo Petraglia, Dave Berg
2005	Jo Dee Messina	Delicious Surprise	"You Were Just Here"	Troy Verges, Brett James
2005	Carrie Underwood	Some Hearts	"Wasted"	Troy Verges, Marv Green
2005	Carrie Underwood	Some Hearts	"Jesus, Take the Wheel"	Brett James, Gordie Sampson
2005	Carrie Underwood	Some Hearts	"Starts with Goodbye"	Angelo Petraglia
2005	Lee Ann Womack	There's More Where That Came From	"Painless"	Bill Luther, Luke Laird
2005	Trisha Yearwood	Jasper County	"Gimmie the Good Stuff"	Angelo Petraglia, George Ducas
2006	Julie Roberts	Men & Mascara	"Men & Mascara"	Marv Green, Chris Lindsey, Aimee Mayo
2006	Julie Roberts	Men & Mascara	"Mama Don't Cry"	Rivers Rutherford
2006	Kellie Pickler	Small Time Girl	"Girls Like Me"	Marv Green, Chris Lindsey, Aimee Mayo
2006	Keith Urban	Love, Pain & the Whole Crazy Thing	"God Made Woman"	Gordie Sampson, Steve McEwan
2007	Jason Aldean	Relentless	"Grown Woman" (with Miranda Lambert)	Brett James
2007	Bon Jovi	Lost Highway	"Seat Next to You"	Jon Bon Jovi, Richie Sambora
2007	Sara Evans	Greatest Hits	"As If"	Sara Evans, John Shanks
2007	Sara Evans	Greatest Hits	"Some Things Never Change"	Sara Evans, Matt Evans, John Shanks
2007	Martina McBride	Waking Up Laughing	"If I Had Your Name"	Gordie Sampson, Steve McEwan
2007	Martina McBride	Waking Up Laughing	"Cry Cry ('Til the Sun Shines)"	Chris Lindsey, Aimee Mayo, Marv Green
2007	Tim McGraw	Let It Go	"Put Your Lovin' on Me"	Luke Laird
2007	Carrie Underwood	Carnival Ride	"So Small"	Carrie Underwood, Luke Laird
2007	Carrie Underwood	Carnival Ride	"Just a Dream"	Gordie Sampson, Steve McEwan
2007	Carrie Underwood	Carnival Ride	"Get Out of This Town"	Gordie Sampson, Steve McEwan
2007	Carrie Underwood	Carnival Ride	"Last Name"	Carrie Underwood, Luke Laird
2007	Carrie Underwood	Carnival Ride	"Twisted"	Luke Laird, Brett James
2007	Carrie Underwood	Carnival Ride	"Wheel of the World"	Aimee Mayo, Chris Lindsey
2007	Trisha Yearwood	Heaven, Heartache and the Power of Love	"Cowboys Are My Weakness"	Jim McCormick, Karyn Rochelle
2008	Kristy Lee Cook	Why Wait	"Cowgirls"	Ryan Tyler, Angelo Petraglia
2008	Josh Gracin	We Weren't Crazy	"Found"	Matthew Prime, Gordie Sampson, Steve McEwan
2008	Heidi Newfield	What Am I Waiting For	"Cry Cry ('Til the Sun Shines)"	Chris Lindsey, Aimee Mayo, Marv Green
2008	Kellie Pickler	Kellie Pickler	"Happy"	Kellie Pickler, Kyle Jacobs, Josh Kear, Chris Lindsey, Aimee Mayo, Troy Verges, Karyn Rochelle, Chris Tompkins
2008	Jessica Simpson	Do You Know	"You're My Sunday"	Jessica Simpson, Luke Laird
2008	Jessica Simpson	Do You Know	"Sipping on History"	Jessica Simpson, Luke Laird
2008	Jessica Simpson	Do You Know	"Still Don't Stop Me"	Jessica Simpson, Luke Laird
2008	Jessica Simpson	Do You Know	"When I Loved You Like That"	Jessica Simpson, Chris Lindsey, Aimee Mayo
2008	Jessica Simpson	Do You Know	"Might as Well Be Making Love"	Gordie Sampson, Troy Verges
2008	Taylor Swift	Fearless	"Fearless"	Taylor Swift, Liz Rose
2008	Lee Ann Womack	Call Me Crazy	"Painless"	Brett James, Angelo Petraglia
2009	BoA	BoA	"Obsessed"	Brian Seals Kennedy, Troy Verges
2009	Caitlin & Will	Caitlin & Will	"Address in the Stars"	Caitlin Lynn, Aimee Mayo, Chris Lindsey
2009	Miley Cyrus	Hannah Montana: The Movie	"Don't Walk Away"	Miley Cyrus, John Shanks
2009	Miley Cyrus	The Time of Our Lives (EP)	"When I Look at You"	John Shanks
2009	Emerson Drive	Believe	"That Kind of Beautiful"	Luke Laird, Gordie Sampson
2009	Martina McBride	Shine	"You're Not Leaving Me"	Gordie Sampson, Troy Verges
2009	Carrie Underwood	Play On	"Someday When I Stop Loving You"	Steve McEwan, Gordie Sampson
2009	Carrie Underwood	Play On	"This Time"	Steve McEwan, Gordie Sampson
2009	Carrie Underwood	Play On	"Unapologetic"	Carrie Underwood, Raine Maida, Chantal Kreviazuk
2009	Jimmy Wayne	Sara Smile	"All in the Time in the World"	Steve Robson
2009	Holly Williams	Here with Me	"Keep the Change"	Luke Laird
2010	Michelle Branch	Everything Comes and Goes	"Sooner or Later"	Michelle Branch, John Shanks
2010	Michelle Branch	Everything Comes and Goes	"I Want Tears"	John Shanks
2010	Michelle Branch	Everything Comes and Goes	"Crazy Ride"	Michelle Branch
2010	Michelle Branch	Everything Comes and Goes	"Summertime"	Michelle Branch, John Shanks
2010	Michelle Branch	Everything Comes and Goes	"Long Goodbye" (with Dwight Yoakam)	Michelle Branch
2010	Michelle Branch	Everything Comes and Goes	"I'm Not That Strong"	Michelle Branch, John Shanks
2010	Michelle Branch	Everything Comes and Goes	"Through the Radio"	Michelle Branch, John Shanks
2010	Miley Cyrus	Can't Be Tamed	"My Heart Beats for Love"	Miley Cyrus, John Shanks, Gordie Sampson
2010	Jessica Harp	A Woman Needs	"Good Enough for Me"	Carrie Underwood, Luke Laird
2010	Lady Antebellum	Need You Now	"American Honey"	Cary Barlowe, Shane Stevens
2010	Little Big Town	The Reason Why	"Kiss Goodbye"	Gordie Sampson, Steve McEwan
2010	Little Big Town	The Reason Why	"Shut Up Train"	Chris Tompkins, Luke Laird
2010	Carrie Underwood	The Chronicles of Narnia: The Voyage of the Dawn Treader	"There's a Place for Us"	Carrie Underwood, David Hodges
2011	Lauren Alaina	Wildflower	"Tupelo"	Steve McEwan, Gordie Sampson
2011	Lauren Alaina	Wildflower	"She's a Wildflower"	Steve McEwan, Gordie Sampson
2011	Edens Edge	Edens Edge (EP)	"Feels So Real"	Tia Sillers, Angelo Petraglia
2011	Sara Evans	Stronger	"A Little Bit Stronger"	Luke Laird, Hillary Scott
2011	Lady Antebellum	Own the Night	"Cold As Stone"	Hillary Scott, Charles Kelley, Dave Haywood
2011	Martina McBride	Eleven	"Always Be This Way"	Martina McBride, Brett James
2011	Martina McBride	Eleven	"Summer of Love"	Martina McBride, Brett James
2011	Steel Magnolia	Steel Magnolia	"Not Tonight"	Shane Stevens
2011	Steel Magnolia	Steel Magnolia	"Last Night Again"	Joshua Scott Jones, Meghan Linsey
2012	Edens Edge	Edens Edge	"Too Good to Be True"	Gordie Sampson, Troy Verges
2012	Edens Edge	Edens Edge	"Feels So Real"	Tia Sillers, Angelo Petraglia
2012	Gloriana	A Thousand Miles Left Behind	"Sunset Lovin"	Mike Gossin, Matt Serletic
2012	Kira Isabella	Love Me Like That	"Songs About You"	Blair Daly, Troy Verges
2012	Little Big Town	Tornado	"Sober"	Liz Rose, Lori McKenna
2012	Martina McBride	Hits and More	"Strait to the Bone"	Phil Barnhart, Kevin Paige
2012	Martina McBride	Hits and More	"Being Myself"	Troy Verges, Brett James
2012	Hayden Panettiere	The Music of Nashville: Season 1, Volume 1	"Telescope"	Carey Barlowe
2012	Carrie Underwood	Blown Away	"Two Black Cadillacs"	Carrie Underwood, Josh Kear
2012	Carrie Underwood	Blown Away	"See You Again"	Carrie Underwood, David Hodges
2012	Carrie Underwood	Blown Away	"Do You Think About Me"	Cary Barlowe, Shane Stevens
2012	Carrie Underwood	Blown Away	"Forver Changed"	Tom Douglas, James T. Slater
2012	Carrie Underwood	Blown Away	"Thank God For Hometowns"	Luke Laird, Ashley Gorley
2012	Carrie Underwood	Blown Away	"Good In Goodbye"	Carrie Underwood, Ryan Tedder
2012	Carrie Underwood	Blown Away	"Leave Love Alone"	Gordie Sampson, Troy Verges
2013	Gary Allan	Set You Free	"Every Storm (Runs Out of Rain)"	Gary Allan, Matt Warren
2013	Gary Allan	Set You Free	"One More Time"	Gary Allan, Matt Warren
2013	Lady Antebellum	Golden	"Get to Me"	James T. Slater
2013	Lady Antebellum	Golden	"Long Teenage Goodbye"	Hillary Scott, Charles Kelley, Dave Haywood
2013	Thompson Square	Just Feels Good	"Testing the Water"	Luke Laird, Shane McAnally
2014	Dierks Bentley	Riser	"Bourbon in Kentucky"	Gordie Sampson, Ryan Tyndall
2014	Dierks Bentley	Riser	"Back Porch"	Carey Barlowe, Jaren Johnston
2014	Lee Brice	I Don't Dance	"Somebody's Been Drinking"	Ashley Gorley, Shane McAnally
2014	Mickey Guyton	Unbreakable	"Pretty Little Mustang"	Mickey Guyton, Jeremy Spillman
2014	Lucy Hale	Road Between	"You Sound Good to Me"	Ashley Gorley, Luke Laird
2014	Lucy Hale	Road Between	"Nervous Girls"	Tom Douglas, James T. Slater
2014	Little Big Town	Pain Killer	"Tumble and Fall"	Karen Fairchild, Kimberly Schlapman, Lori McKenna, Liz Rose
2014	Little Big Town	Pain Killer	"Pain Killer"	Karen Fairchild, Jimi Westbrook, Blair Daly
2014	Little Big Town	Pain Killer	"Girl Crush"	Lori McKenna, Liz Rose
2014	Little Big Town	Pain Killer	"Save Your Sin"	Lori McKenna, Liz Rose
2014	Tim McGraw	Sundown Heaven Town	"Shotgun Rider"	Marv Green, Troy Verges
2014	Jo Dee Messina	Me	"Take It"	Brett James, Angelo Petraglia
2014	Jess Moskaluke	Light Up the Night	"Cheap Wine and Cigarettes"	Carey Barlowe
2014	Shakira	Shakira	"Medicine" (feat. Blake Shelton)	Shakira, Mark Bright
2014	Shakira	Shakira	"Spotlight"	Shakira, Mark Bright
2014	Leah Turner	Leah Turner	"Bless My Heart"	Leah Turner, Cary Barlowe, Jesse Frasure
2014	Leah Turner	Leah Turner	"Beat Up Bronco"	Leah Turner, Cary Barlowe, Jesse Frasure
2014	Carrie Underwood	Greatest Hits: Decade Number 1	"Little Toy Guns"	Carrie Underwood, Chris DeStefano
2015	Luke Bryan	Kill the Lights	"To the Moon and Back"	Tom Douglas, Tony Dean
2015	Tyler Farr	Suffer in Peace	"Withdrawals"	Josh Kear, Geordie Sampsom
2015	Tim McGraw	Damn Country Music	"Want You Back"	Ashley Gorley, Rodney Clawson
2015	Aubrey Peeples	Nashville Season 4	"Makes No Sense At All"	Ashley Monroe
2015	Darius Rucker	Southern Style	"Low Country"	Darius Rucker, Troy Verges, Blair Daly
2015	Mickey Guyton	Mickey Guyton	"Somebody Else Will"	Ashley Gorley, Luke Laird
2015	Carrie Underwood	Storyteller	"Renegade Runaway"	Carrie Underwood, Chris DeStefano
2015	Carrie Underwood	Storyteller	"Dirty Laundry"	Zach Crowell, Ashley Gorley
2015	Carrie Underwood	Storyteller	"Church Bells"	Carrie Underwood, Brett James
2015	Carrie Underwood	Storyteller	"Smoke Break"	Carrie Underwood, Chris DeStefano
2015	Carrie Underwood	Storyteller	"Like I'll Never Love You Again"	Liz Rose, Lori McKenna
2015	Carrie Underwood	Storyteller	"Chaser"	Carrie Underwood, Mike Elizondo
2015	Carrie Underwood	Storyteller	"Clock Don't Stop"	Blair Daly, Chris DeStefano
2015	Carrie Underwood	Storyteller	"The Girl You Think I Am "	Carrie Underwood, David Hodges
2015	Carrie Underwood	Storyteller	"What I Never Knew I Always Wanted"	Carrie Underwood, Brett James
2015	Carrie Underwood	Storyteller	"Little Girl Don't Grow Up Too Fast"	Carrie Underwood, Chris DeStefano
2016	Dierks Bentley	Black	"Can't Be Replaced"	Dierks Bentley, Luke Laird
2016	Kenny Chesney	Cosmic Hallelujah	"Trip Around the Sun"	Nick Brophy, Brett James
2016	Florida Georgia Line	Dig Your Roots	"God, Your Mama, and Me" (feat. Backstreet Boys)	Josh Kear, Gordie Sampson
2016	Lady Gaga	Joanne	"A-Yo"	Stefani Germanotta, Mark Ronson, Michael Tucker
2016	Lady Gaga	Joanne	"Million Reasons"	Stefani Germanotta, Mark Ronson
2016	Lady Gaga	Joanne	"Grigio Girls"	Stefani Germanotta, Mark Ronson, Michael Tucker
2016	Martina McBride	Reckless	"Everybody Wants to Be Loved"	Steve McEwan, Gordie Sampson
2016	Martina McBride	Reckless	"That's the Thing About Love"	Gordie Sampson, Troy Verges
2016	Jake Owen	American Love	"Where I Am"	Ross Copperman, Shane McAnally
2016	Jake Owen	American Love	"When You Love Someone"	Blair Daly, Sean McConnell
2016	Keith Urban	Ripcord	"Blue Ain't Your Color"	Steven Lee Olsen, Clint Lagerberg
2017	Kelsea Ballerini	Unapologetically	"End of the World"	Kelsea Ballerini, Lindsay Rimes
2017	Kelsea Ballerini	Unapologetically	"Unapologetically"	Kelsea Ballerini, Forest Glen Whitehead
2017	Kelsea Ballerini	Unapologetically	"Legends"	Kelsea Ballerini, Forest Glen Whitehead
2017	Sara Evans	Words	"Diving in Deep"	Steve McEwan, Gordie Sampson
2017	Sara Evans	Words	"All the Love You Left Me"	Gordie Sampson, Ben West
2017	Lady Antebellum	Heart Break	"Heart Break"	Dave Haywood, Hillary Scott, Charles Kelley, Jesse Frasure, Nicolle Galyon
2017	Little Big Town	The Breaker	"Lost in California"	Lori McKenna, Liz Rose
2017	Little Big Town	The Breaker	"Don't Die Young, Don't Get Old"	Karen Fairchild, Kimberly Schlapman, Lori McKenna
2017	Little Big Town	The Breaker	"Beat Up Bible"	Cart Barlowe, Shane Stevens
2017	Little Big Town	The Breaker	"When Someone Stops Loving You"	Lori McKenna, Chase McGill
2017	Tim McGraw & Faith Hill	The Rest of Our Life	"The Bed We Made"	Lori McKenna, Liz Rose
2017	Thomas Rhett	Life Changes	"Grave"	Chris DeStefano, Josh Kear
2017	Hayden Panettiere, Lennon Stella	Nashville Season 5	"Water Rising"	Derrick Southerland, Jamie Moore
2017	Parmalee	27861	"Back in the Game"	Rodney Clawson, Matt Dragstrem
2017	Carly Pearce	Every Little Thing	"Hide the Wine"	Ashley Gorley, Luke Laird
2017	Carly Pearce	Every Little Thing	"I Need a Ride Home"	Ashley Gorley, Matt Jenkins
2017	Carly Pearce	Every Little Thing	"Honeysuckle"	busbee, Barry Dean
2018	Dierks Bentley	The Mountain	"You Can't Bring Me Down"	Dierks Bentley, Luke Laird
2018	Lady Gaga	A Star Is Born	"Always Remember Us This Way"	Lady Gaga, Natalie Hemby, Lori McKenna
2018	Lady Gaga	A Star Is Born	"I'll Never Love Again"	Lady Gaga, Natalie Hemby, Aaron Raitiere
2018	Chris Lane	Laps Around the Sun	"Take Back Home Girl" (feat. Tori Kelly)	David Garcia, Josh Miller
2018	Kacey Musgraves	Golden Hour	"Wonder Woman"	Kacey Musgraves, Jesse Frasure, Amy Wadge
2018	Mitchell Tenpenny	Telling All My Secrets	"Somebody's Got Me"	Mitchell Tenpenny, Jordan Schmidt
2018	Carrie Underwood	Cry Pretty	"Cry Pretty"	Carrie Underwood, Lori McKenna, Liz Rose
2018	Carrie Underwood	Cry Pretty	"Ghosts on the Stereo"	Tom Douglas, Andrew Dorff
2018	Carrie Underwood	Cry Pretty	"Low"	Carrie Underwood, David Garcia
2018	Carrie Underwood	Cry Pretty	"Backsliding"	Carrie Underwood, David Garcia
2018	Carrie Underwood	Cry Pretty	"That Song That We Used to Make Love To"	Jason Evigan
2018	Carrie Underwood	Cry Pretty	"Spinning Bottles"	Carrie Underwood, David Garcia, Carol Oordt
2018	Carrie Underwood	Cry Pretty	"End Up With You"	Gordie Sampson, Brett McLaughlin, Will Weatherly
2018	Morgan Wallen	If I Know Me	"Redneck Love Song"	David Garcia, Michael Hardy, Josh Miller
2019	Florida Georgia Line	Can't Say I Ain't Country	"People Are Different"	Hardy, Mark Holman
2019	Hardy	Hixtape, Vol. 1	"No Place Like Hometown"	Hardy, Mark Holman
2019	Hardy	Hixtape, Vol. 1	"One Beer" (feat. Lauren Alaina & Devin Dawson)	Hardy, Jake Mitchell
2019	Lady Antebellum	Ocean	"Mansion"	Chris DeStefano, Josh Miller
2019	Miranda Lambert	Wildcard	"It All Comes Out in the Wash"	Miranda Lambert, Lori McKenna, Liz Rose
2019	Miranda Lambert	Wildcard	"Way Too Pretty for Prison" (with Maren Morris)	Miranda Lambert, Lori McKenna, Liz Rose
2019	Miranda Lambert	Wildcard	"Fire Escape"	Miranda Lambert, Lori McKenna, Liz Rose
2019	Miranda Lambert	Wildcard	"Track Record"	Miranda Lambert, Liz Rose
2019	Reba McEntire	Stronger Than the Truth	"The Clown"	Dallas Davidson, James T. Slater
2019	Runaway June	Blue Roses	"Buy My Own Drinks"	Naomi Cooke, Hannah Mullholand, Jennifer Wayne, Josh Kear
2019	Trisha Yearwood	Every Girl	"Drink Up"	Gordie Sampson, Troy Verges
2020	Kelsea Ballerini	Kelsea/Ballerini	"Love Me Like a Girl"	Kelsea Ballerini, Ross Copperman, Jordan Minton, Lauren Grieve
2020	Kelsea Ballerini	Kelsea/Ballerini	"Hole in the Bottle"	Kelsea Ballerini, Jesse Frasure, Ashley Gorley, Steph Jones
2020	Luke Bryan	Born Here Live Here Die Here	"Knockin' Boots"	Jon Nite, Gordie Sampson
2020	Luke Bryan	Born Here Live Here Die Here	"What She Wants Tonight"	Luke Bryan, Rose Copperman, Jon Nite
2020	Cam	The Otherside	"The Otherside"	Camaron Ochs, Tim Bergling, Tyler Johnson
2020	Cam	The Otherside	"Like a Movie"	Camaron Ochs, Lori McKenna, Liz Rose
2020	Cam	The Otherside	"Till There's Nothing Left"	Camaron Ochs, Jeff Bhasker, Tyler Johnson
2020	Jordan Davis	Jordan Davis	"Almost Maybes"	Jordan Davis, Jesse Frasure
2020	Mickey Guyton	Bridges	"Heaven Down Here"	Mickey Guyton, Josh Kear, Geordie Sampson
2020	Hardy	A Rock	"Boots"	Hardy, David Garcia
2020	Hardy	A Rock	"So Close" (feat. Ashland Craft)	Hardy, Mark Holman
2020	Hardy	A Rock	"Hate Your Hometown"	Hardy, David Garcia
2020	Little Big Town	Nightfall	"Throw Your Love Away"	Karen Fairchild, Kimberly Schlapman, Liz Rose
2020	Carly Pearce	Carly Pearce	"Closer to You"	Gordie Sampson, Troy Verges
2020	Carly Pearce	Carly Pearce	"You Kissed Me First"	Gordie Sampson, Troy Verges
2020	Carly Pearce	Carly Pearce	"Greener Grass"	Johnny Price, Ben West
2020	Carrie Underwood	My Gift	"Favorite Time of the Year"	Carrie Underwood, Chris DeStefano
2021	Gary Allan	Ruthless	"Ruthless"	busbee, Ryan Hurd
2021	Lauren Alaina	Sitting Pretty on Top of the World	"It Was Me"	Lauren Alaina
2021	Lauren Alaina	Sitting Pretty on Top of the World	"Same Story, Different Saturday Night"	Lauren Alaina, Lori McKenna, Liz Rose
2021	Lauren Alaina	Sitting Pretty on Top of the World	"I'm Not Sad Anymore"	Lauren Alaina, Lori McKenna, Liz Rose
2021	Lauren Alaina	Sitting Pretty on Top of the World	"Written in the Bar"	Lauren Alaina, Lori McKenna, Liz Rose
2021	Jojo Mason	Sky Full of Stars (EP)	"Broken Umbrella"	Jordan Davis, Luke Laird
2021	Morgan Wallen	Dangerous: The Double Album	"Need a Boat"	Morgan Wallen, Matt Dragstrem
2021	Chris Young	Famous Friends	"Cross Every Line"	David Garcia, Chase McGill
2022	Jason Aldean	Georgia	"My Weakness"	Barry Dean, Gordon Sampson
2022	Priscilla Block	Welcome to the Block Party	"I Know a Girl" (feat. Hillary Lindsey)	Priscilla Block, David Garcia
2022	Little Big Town	Mr. Sun	"Three Whiskeys and the Truth"	Kimberly Fairchild, Kimberly Schlapman, Liz Rose, Lori McKenna
2022	Little Big Town	Mr. Sun	"Something Strong"	Kimberly Fairchild, Kimberly Schlapman, Liz Rose, Lori McKenna
2022	Dustin Lynch	Blue in the Sky	"Tequila on a Boat" (feat. Chris Lane)	Justin Ebach, Matt Alderman
2022	Maren Morris	Humble Quest	"Hummingbird"	Maren Morris, Lori McKenna, Liz Rose
2022	Carrie Underwood	Denim & Rhinestones	"Denim & Rhinestones"	Carrie Underwood, Josh Kear, David Garcia
2022	Carrie Underwood	Denim & Rhinestones	"Velvet Heartbreak"	Carrie Underwood, David Garcia
2022	Carrie Underwood	Denim & Rhinestones	"Ghost Story"	David Garcia, Josh Kear
2022	Carrie Underwood	Denim & Rhinestones	"Hate My Heart"	Carrie Underwood, Michael Hardy, David Garcia
2022	Carrie Underwood	Denim & Rhinestones	"Burn"	Carrie Underwood, David Garcia, Ashley Gorley
2022	Carrie Underwood	Denim & Rhinestones	"Faster"	Carrie Underwood, David Garcia
2022	Carrie Underwood	Denim & Rhinestones	"Pink Champagne"	Carrie Underwood, David Garcia, Ashley Gorley
2022	Carrie Underwood	Denim & Rhinestones	"She Don't Know"	Carrie Underwood, David Garcia
2022	Madeline Merlo	Slide	"I Need a Drink"	Madeline Merlo, Zach Crowell, Ashley Gorley
2023	Grace Potter	Mother Road	"Rosed Colored Rearview"	Grace Potter, Carey Barlowe, Margaret McRee
2023	Grace Potter	Mother Road	"All My Ghosts"	Grace Potter, Carey Barlowe, Margaret McRee
2023	Dallas Smith	Dallas Smith	"I Would"	Michael Hardy, Mark Holman
2023	Morgan Wallen	One Thing at a Time	"I Deserve a Drink"	Morgan Wallen, Devin Dawson, Jacob Durrett
2024	Kelsea Ballerini	Patterns	"Patterns"	Kelsea Ballerini, Karen Fairchild, Jessi Jo Dillion, Alysa Vanderheym
2024	Kelsea Ballerini	Patterns	"Sorry Mom"	Kelsea Ballerini, Karen Fairchild, Jessi Jo Dillion, Alysa Vanderheym
2024	Kelsea Ballerini	Patterns	"Baggage"	Kelsea Ballerini, Karen Fairchild, Jessi Jo Dillion, Alysa Vanderheym
2024	Kelsea Ballerini	Patterns	"First Rodeo"	Kelsea Ballerini, Karen Fairchild, Jessi Jo Dillion, Alysa Vanderheym
2024	Kelsea Ballerini	Patterns	"Two Things"	Kelsea Ballerini, Karen Fairchild, Jessi Jo Dillion, Alysa Vanderheym
2024	Kelsea Ballerini	Patterns	"We Broke Up"	Kelsea Ballerini, Karen Fairchild, Jessi Jo Dillion, Alysa Vanderheym
2024	Kelsea Ballerini	Patterns	"Be for Your Love"	Kelsea Ballerini, Karen Fairchild, Jessi Jo Dillion, Alysa Vanderheym
2024	Kelsea Ballerini	Patterns	"To The Men That Love Women After Heartbreak"	Kelsea Ballerini, Karen Fairchild, Jessi Jo Dillion
2024	Gabby Barrett	Chapter & Verse	"The Chapter"	Gabby Barrett, Ross Copperman, Jon Nite
2024	Gabby Barrett	Chapter & Verse	"Had It All"	Gabby Barrett, Ross Copperman, Jon Nite
2024	Gabby Barrett	Chapter & Verse	"You're My Texas"	Gabby Barrett, Miranda Lambert
2024	Luke Bryan	Mind of a Country Boy	"Kansas"	Matt Dragstrem, Chase McGill
2024	Luke Bryan	Mind of a Country Boy	"Closing Time in California"	John Byron, Mark Holman, Chase McGill
2024	MacKenzie Porter	Nobody's Born with a Broken Heart	"Easy to Miss"	Emily Warren, Will Weatherly
2025	Parker McCollum	Parker McCollum	"Come On"	Parker McCollum, Lori McKenna, Liz Rose
2025	Parker McCollum	Parker McCollum	"Big Ole Fancy House"	Parker McCollum, Lori McKenna, Liz Rose
2025	Jon Pardi	Honkytonk Hollywood	"She Gets to Drinking"	Jon Pardi, Hailey Whitters
2025	Jon Pardi	Honkytonk Hollywood	"Don't You Wanna Know""	Jon Pardi, Luke Laird

== Personal life ==
Lindsey is married to songwriter Cary Barlowe. The couple have a daughter born in 2015.

She has two sisters, Lauren Lindsey Fowler and Taylor Harris Lindsey. Taylor Lindsey is an executive at Sony Music Nashville.
