= Quarterback (disambiguation) =

A quarterback is a position in American and Canadian football.

Quarterback may also refer to:

- "Quarterback" (song), by Kira Isabella, 2014
- Quarterback (TV series), a 2023 streaming television series
- Quarterback (video game), a 1987 American football arcade game
- The Quarterback (1926 film), an American comedy silent film
- The Quarterback (1940 film), an American comedy film
- "The Quarterback" (Glee), a television episode
- Glee: The Quarterback, a 2013 EP by the cast of Glee
