= Cindy Mabe =

American music industry executive

- Born: Kernersville, North Carolina, U.S.
- Education: Belmont University
- Occupation: Record industry executive
- Years active: 1995–present
- Employer: Universal Music Group Nashville
- Title: CEO and chair
- Awards: Country Music Hall of Fame honoree Billboard Power 100; Billboard Country Music Power Players Executive of the Year (2023) and Billboard Country Power Player (2024)

Cindy Mabe is an American music industry executive. She was the CEO and chair of Universal Music Group Nashville, a position she held from April 2023 to February 2025. Noted as a strong advocate for musicians – and a "beacon of support" for female artists – she is the first woman to lead a major country music record label.

Mabe has worked with artists including Luke Bryan, Eric Church, Mickey Guyton, Kacey Musgraves, Jon Pardi, Chris Stapleton, George Strait, Carrie Underwood, and Keith Urban.
