= A Little More Work =

Single by Kira Isabella

from the album Love Me Like That
- Released: July 31, 2012
- Genre: Country, country pop
- Length: 3:15
- Label: Sony Music Canada
- Songwriters: Kira Isabella; Jason Phelps; Walt Aldridge
- Producers: Jerry Lane; Mark Liggett

Kira Isabella singles chronology
"A Real Good Radio" (2011)	"A Little More Work" (2012)	"Songs About You" (2012)

US re-release cover

"A Little More Work" is a song recorded by Canadian country music artist Kira Isabella. It was released July 31, 2012 as the third single from her debut studio album Love Me Like That (2012). Peaking at number 68 on the Billboard Canadian Hot 100 and number 5 on the Canada Country airplay chart, it is, as of March 2018, Isabella's most commercially successful single. A "radio mix" of the song was released October 21, 2014 as Isabella's second American single, following "Quarterback".

== Composition ==
"A Little More Work" is a country song additionally influenced by pop and rock music with a duration of three minutes and fifteen seconds. MusicRow also described the song's sound as "bluesy". It was written by Kira Isabella, Jason Phelps, and Walt Aldridge, and was produced by Jerry Lane and Mark Liggett. The song is instrumented by distorted guitars and features empowering lyrics about a girl who refuses to give up her heart easily, insisting her love interest has "a little more work" to do to keep her satisfied. Isabella's "good girl who brashly goes her own way" attitude on the song has been favorably compared to Taylor Swift by Wondering Sound magazine.

== Music video ==
The music video was directed by Ben Knechtel and premiered August 17, 2012.

=== Awards and nominations ===
The video for "A Little More Work" was nominated for the CMT Video of the Year award at the 2013 Canadian Country Music Association Awards, but lost to Gord Bamford's "Leaning on a Lonesome Song".

== Chart performance ==
"A Little More Work" debuted at number 93 on the Canadian Hot 100 for the week of September 8, 2012.

Chart (2012)	Peak position
Canada (Canadian Hot 100)	68
Canada Country (Billboard)	5

== Release history ==
Country	Date	Format	Label	Ref.
Canada	July 31, 2012	Digital download	Sony Music Canada	
Canada	July 31, 2012	Country radio	Sony Music Canada	
United States	October 21, 2014	Digital download (Radio mix)	Sony Music Canada	
United States	November 2014	Country radio	Sony Music Canada	
