= Remember Her Name (Mickey Guyton album) =

Studio album by Mickey Guyton
- Released: September 24, 2021
- Genre: Country; country pop
- Length: 50:45
- Label: Capitol Nashville
- Producer: Nathan Chapman; David Kalmusky; Karen Kosowski; Jimmy Robbins; Johnny Simmen; Andy Skib; Gavin Slate; Forest Whitehead

Mickey Guyton chronology
Bridges (2020)	Remember Her Name (2021)	House on Fire (2024)

Singles from Remember Her Name
- 1. "What Are You Gonna Tell Her?" Released: March 6, 2020; 2. "Black Like Me" Released: June 2, 2020

Remember Her Name is the debut studio album by American country artist Mickey Guyton. It was released on September 24, 2021, through Capitol Records Nashville. A follow-up release to her extended play, Bridges (2020), the album includes the singles "What Are You Gonna Tell Her?", "Black Like Me" and a re-recorded version of her 2015 single, "Better Than You Left Me". The project centers around her personal and professional setbacks over the course of several years. Lyrical themes highlight Guyton's insecurities, anxieties while on her musical journey. The project received generally a favorable response from critics as well.

== Background ==
Mickey Guyton had been signed to Capitol Records Nashville in 2011. She later released several extended plays (EPs) until her 2015 debut single "Better Than You Left Me". Although reaching the top 40, the single did not create enough momentum to spawn a full-length album release. Guyton had also reached a personal and professional crossroads that prompted her to change her outlook on music. She started writing songs with a small group of people and wrote songs that felt more personal to her. "A lot of these songs were just kind of therapy for me. I never wrote these thinking that they were ever going to be heard," she told The New York Times.

Remember Her Name was crafted from these writing sessions. She titled the album in tribute to Breonna Taylor, a black resident of Louisville, Kentucky who was shot and killed by local police enforcement. "The frustration that I've felt as an African-American has been a part of my process for a while. So the song, and album, are dedicated to [Breonna Taylor] and giving her the justice that she deserves," she told Country Music Television.

== Content ==
Remember Her Name features production credits from Nathan Chapman, David Kalmusky, Karen Kosowski, Jimmy Robbins, Johnny Simmen, Andy Skib, Gavin Slate and Forest Whitehead. The disc's 16 tracks center around Guyton's "self-discovery" and "re-discovery" in the music world. Stephen Thomas Erlewine of AllMusic described the track "All American" as a song that embraces "her heritage as well as inclusion". The fourth track "Love My Hair" came from Guyton's insecurities about her black hair. In a promotional statement from UMG Nashville, Guyton stated that the title track is "a song for anyone who has ever felt less than, forgotten or up against impossible obstacles." The eighth track, "Do You Really Wanna Know", is based on Guyton's experiences with going to therapy and taking control of an alcohol problem.

In addition, the track "Words" was derived from a comment Guyton read online pertaining to her race. Carl Wilson of Slate magazine described "Indigo" as "another eponym to bear in mind, an alias that might encompass Guyton more fully." Other songs on the project are dedicated to Guyton's husband who provided an emotional support to her during difficult times. These tracks include "Higher", "Lay It on Me" and "Dancing in the Living Room". She also covers Beyonce's pop single "If I Were a Boy".

Other track were originally included on Guyton's 2020 extended play, Bridges. This includes "Rosé", that Guyton described as a "low-key protest song for women" about how women should have their song about drinking. Also from Bridges is the song "What Are You Gonna Tell Her?", which The New York Times described as "a bracing ballad about the limitations society places on young women." A third song from the EP is "Black Like Me". The song was written in 2019 and was originally composed as a way to describe her experiences as a black woman in America. It has since received attention since its original release as a song in 2020. The album also include a re-recorded version of "Better Than You Left Me", Guyton's debut single, which was first released in 2015 and first included on her eponymous extended play.

== Critical reception ==
Professional ratings
Aggregate scores
Source	Rating
Metacritic	79/100
Review scores
Source	Rating
AllMusic	3.5/5 stars
Pitchfork	7.0/10
Rolling Stone	4/5 stars

Remember Her Name was met with generally favorable reviews. At Metacritic, which assigns a normalized rating out of 100 to reviews from mainstream publications, the album received an average score of 79, based on 6 reviews. Rating it 3.5 out of 5 stars, Stephen Thomas Erlewine of AllMusic wrote that "Guyton's specific experiences of being a Black woman in country music are a distinctly American experience, and those struggles inform the heartbreaking 'What Are You Gonna Tell Her' and rousing title track. A good portion of the record is devoted to lighter songs of love, dancing, and drinking -- the topics that are country music's bread and butter -- and they showcase Guyton's versatility as a singer". He concluded that "If the bombast and ballads flatten the production of Remember Her Name somewhat, it nevertheless feels genuine, not calculated. Guyton is broadening and expanding the genre-bending sounds of 1990s country-pop".

Jon Caramanica of The New York Times called the album "an astute survey of ambitious country music by a singer-songwriter who’s been carefully watching from the sidelines, deciding what parts worked best for her, and what needed to be tinkered with." Slate highlighted how the album is essentially a "protest record": "On Remember Her Name, Mickey Guyton lays down a brief for her reformist side as eloquently as anyone in popular music ever has.

Meanwhile, Pitchfork gave the album a 7.0 rating. Reviewer Claire Shaffer disliked the album's country pop production, which she characterized as "bland". Yet Shaffer praised Guyton's vocal delivery and truthfulness in her lyrics: "As country music continues to grapple with its racial reckoning, Guyton has had no qualms about calling her white peers' complacency to task, and it's a relief that her defiance has carried over into the music. At its best, Remember Her Name captures her steadfastness and grace in equal measure." Jonathan Bernstein of Rolling Stone gave the collection a four-star rating in his review and found the album reflective: "She conjures pride, pain, wisdom, and joy when she delivers six words that she wishes the Mickey Guyton of 2015 could hear: 'I'm better than I should be.' And she's right on."

== Release, chart performance and singles ==
Guyton announced the release of Remember Her Name in July 2021, in a statement from her record label. Guyton made the album's release public following her appearance at the 2021 CMT Music Awards, where she performed alongside Gladys Knight. The album was released on September 24, 2021, on Capitol Records Nashville. With its release, it became Guyton's first full-length studio album issued in her career. It was offered as a compact disc, a music download and to streaming sites. It reached a peak of 47 on the Billboard Top Country Albums, becoming her first album to reach the list in her career. It was also her fourth release to make the Billboard Top Heatseekers chart, peaking at number seven.

Prior to the album's release, Capitol had issued "What Are You Gonna Tell Her?" as a single on March 6, 2020, and "Black Like Me" as a single on June 2, 2020. The latter recording spent four weeks on the Billboard adult contemporary chart and reached number 27. In addition several promotional singles were also released prior to the album: the title track, "If I Were a Boy", "All-American", and "Love My Hair". At the 64th Annual Grammy Awards, it was nominated for Grammy Award for Best Country Album, while the title track received nominations for Best Country Solo Performance and Best Country Song.

== Track listing ==
Remember Her Name track listing
No.	Title	Writer(s)	Producers	Length
1.	"Remember Her Name"	Mickey Guyton; Blake Hubbard; Jarrod Ingram; Parker Welling	Karen Kosowski	2:58
2.	"All American"	Guyton; Kosowski; Victoria Banks; Emma-Lee	Kosowski	3:02
3.	"Different"	Guyton; Kosowski; Emma-Lee	Kosowski	2:50
4.	"Love My Hair"	Guyton; Anna Krantz	Kosowski	2:57
5.	"Lay It on Me"	Guyton; Jaden Michaels; Gavin Slate	Kosowski; Slate	3:09
6.	"Higher"	Guyton; Nathan Chapman; Fraser Churchill; Preston Glass; Narada Walden	Chapman	2:56
7.	"Dancing in the Living Room"	Guyton; Banks; Kosowski; Emma-Lee	Kosowski	3:16
8.	"Do You Really Wanna Know"	Guyton; Melissa Fuller; Andy Skib	Skib	3:08
9.	"Black Like Me"	Chapman; Churchill; Emma Davidson Dillon; Guyton	Chapman; Forest Whitehead	3:30
10.	"Words"	Guyton; Abbey Cone; David Kalmusky	Kalmusky	3:28
11.	"What Are You Gonna Tell Her?"	Guyton; Banks; Kosowski; Emma-Lee	Kosowski	3:15
12.	"Smoke"	Guyton; Chapman; Balewa Muhammad	Chapman	2:15
13.	"Rosé"	Guyton; Banks; Kosowski	Kosowski; Whitehead	2:57
14.	"Indigo"	Guyton; Mozella; Jimmy Robbins; Laura Veltz	Robbins	2:58
15.	"If I Were a Boy"	BC Jean; Toby Gad	Kosowski	4:04
16.	"Better Than You Left Me" (Fly Higher Version)	Guyton; Chapman; Jennifer Hanson; Jen Schott	Johnny Simmen	4:02
Total length:				50:45

== Personnel ==
All credits are adapted from the liner notes of Remember Her Name.

Vocals

- Robert Bailey – background vocalist
- Victoria Banks – background vocalist
- Nathan Chapman – background vocalist
- Abbey Cone – background vocalist
- Kim Fleming – background vocalist
- Mickey Guyton – lead vocalist
- Vicki Hampton – background vocalist
- Karen Kosowski – background vocalist
- Emma-Lee – background vocalist
- Jaden Michaels – background vocalist
- Johnny Simmen – background vocalist
- Andy Skib – background vocalist
- Gavin Slate – background vocalist

Musicians

- Nathan Chapman – acoustic guitar, banjo, drums, Hammond B3, mandolin, piano, steel guitar
- Chad Cromwell – drums, percussion
- Eleonore Denig – strings
- Kris Donegan – electric guitar
- David Dorn – piano, strings
- Dan Dugmore – pedal steel guitar
- Eddy Dunlap – pedal steel guitar
- Evan Hutchings – drums, percussion
- Kevin Kadish – electric guitar
- David Kalmusky – acoustic guitar, electric guitar, strings, synthesizer, Wurlitzer electric piano
- Karen Kosowski – acoustic guitar, electric guitar, keyboards, organ, piano, synthesizer
- Jason Massey – strings
- Larissa Maestro – cello
- Devin Malone – acoustic guitar, electric guitar
- Amy Peters – keyboards
- Jimmy Robbins – acoustic guitar, keyboards, mandolin
- Jerry Roe – drums, percussion
- Marc Rogers – acoustic bass guitar, bass guitar, electric guitar, synth bass guitar
- Ryan Rossebo – guitar
- Justin Schipper – pedal steel guitar
- Johnny Simmen – drums, guitar, keyboards
- Andy Skib – electric guitar
- Gavin Slate – guitar
- Aaron Sterling – drums, percussion
- Akil Thompson – Hammond B3
- Derek Wells – acoustic guitar, banjo, electric guitar, guitar, mandolin
- Forest Whitehead – acoustic guitar, banjo, bass guitar, electric guitar, keyboards, piano

Technical

- Ethan Barrette – engineer
- Liam Bischoff – assistant recording engineer
- Tyler Burns – assistant recording engineer
- Jason Campbell – production coordinator
- Chad Carlso – engineer
- Nathan Chapman – drum programmer, engineer, producer
- Serban Ghenea – mixer
- Mike "Frog" Griffith – programmer
- Blake Hubbard – programmer
- Jarrod Ingram – programmer
- Scott Johnson – production coordinator
- David Kamulsky – engineer, mixer, producer, programmer
- Karen Kosowski – engineer, editor, mixer, producer, programmer, synthesizer programmer
- Owen Lewis – editor
- Allison McAnally – production coordinator
- Carly McKillip – engineer, editor
- Michael Meechling – assistant recording engineer, assistant mixer
- Andrew Mendelson – mastering engineer
- Amy Peters – engineer, editor, programmer
- Jimmy Robbins – engineer, producer, programmer
- Jerry Roe – engineer
- Justin Schipper – engineer
- Alberto Sewald – engineer, editor
- F. Reid Shippen – engineer, mixer
- Johnny Simmen – engineer, producer, programmer
- Andy Skib – producer, programmer
- Gavin Slate – engineer, mixer, producer, programmer
- Yihan Wei – engineer
- Derek Wells – engineer
- Forest Whitehead – drum programmer, engineer, producer

== Charts ==
Chart performance for Remember Her Name
Chart (2021)	Peak position
US Heatseekers Albums (Billboard)	7
US Top Country Albums (Billboard)	47

== Release history ==
Release history and formats for Remember Her Name
Region	Date	Format	Label	Ref.
Various	September 24, 2021	Compact disc; digital download; streaming	Capitol Records Nashville	
