= Love Me Like That (album) =

Studio album by Kira Isabella
- Released: October 2, 2012
- Recorded: 2011–12; Cincinnati, OH and Toronto, ON
- Genre: Country
- Length: 37:10
- Label: Sony Music Canada
- Producer: Mark Liggett; Jerry Lane

Kira Isabella chronology
Love Me Like That (2012)	Caffeine & Big Dreams (2014)

Singles from Love Me Like That
- 1. "Love Me Like That" Released: July 4, 2011; 2. "A Real Good Radio" Released: November 14, 2011; 3. "A Little More Work" Released: July 30, 2012; 4. "Songs About You" Released: November 14, 2012; 5. "Blame It on Your Truck" Released: May 1, 2013

Professional ratings
Review scores
Source	Rating
Top Country	4.5/5 stars

Love Me Like That is the debut album by Canadian country music artist Kira Isabella. It was released on October 2, 2012 via Sony Music Canada. Its first single, the title track, peaked at number 99 on the Billboard Canadian Hot 100. The album has produced four Top-20 singles on Canadian Country radio, including the No. 7-peaking "A Little More Work".

== Track listing ==
No.	Title	Writer(s)	Length
1.	"Blame It on Your Truck"	Kira Isabella; Jason Phelps	3:25
2.	"Love Me Like That"	Isabella; Phelps	3:35
3.	"A Little More Work"	Isabella; Phelps; Walt Aldridge	3:15
4.	"A Real Good Radio"	Isabella; Phelps	3:32
5.	"Songs About You"	Blair Daly; Hillary Lindsey; Troy Verges	3:25
6.	"I Can Love You Better Than That"	Isabella; Dave Thomson	3:30
7.	"Little White Church"	Isabella; Phelps	3:17
8.	"Gonna Be a Hot One"	Isabella; Phelps	3:12
9.	"Dangerously Obvious"	Isabella; Aldridge; Stephen Kirk	2:58
10.	"Her Heart"	Isabella; Aldridge; Kirk	3:05
11.	"My Diary"	Isabella; Phelps	3:56
Total length:			37:10
