= Chris Buck Band =

Canadian country music group

- Origin: British Columbia, Canada
- Genres: Country
- Labels: Bailey Way; Royalty; Sakamoto Music
- Members: Chris Buck
- Past members: Phillip Puxley; Michael Vanderlans; Paul Kinman; Taylor Allum; Ryan Stead; Matt Genereux
- Website: chrisbuckband.com

Chris Buck Band is a Canadian country music group from British Columbia, Canada composed of Chris Buck, and various band members. Buck formed the band when he lost his best friend to cancer at age 13. Their first single, "Caribbean Dream", was released in 2013. It was included on their debut album, Buck Wild, released in June 2014. Chris Buck Band won the 2014 British Columbia Country Music Association Award for Country Club Act of the Year. At the 2015 BCCMA Awards, they won Country Club Act of the Year and Group/Duo of the Year.

Their second single, "Leave Your Light On", was released in 2015. It peaked at number 44 on the Billboard Canada Country chart. They signed to Bailey Way Entertainment for the release of their next single, "Giddy Up". It debuted on the Canada Country chart in February 2016. In 2017, Chris Buck Band signed with Royalty Records and released their third single "That's When You Know" (Featuring Kira Isabella), which climbed the charts to number 19. In 2022, this song earned them a certified Canadian Gold Record.

Chris Buck has been writing his own music since his first album, which earned him the Songwriter of the Year Award at the 2019 BCCMA Awards. In 2021, he signed a publishing deal in Nashville, Tennessee with Anthem Entertainment which took his creativity to new heights. Chris Buck Band signed with Sakamoto Music in 2021 and started writing and recording his next studio album Answers with producer Jeremy Stover and RED Creative Group. In 2022, Chris Buck released four singles from Answers; "Can't Beat The View", "Thank God for Good Friends", "She Gone", and "Wild and Free". The album won 2023 BCCMA Country Music "Album of the Year".

== Discography ==
=== Studio albums ===
List of studio albums, with selected details
| Title | Details |
|---|---|
| Buck Wild | Released: June 23, 2014; Label: self-released |
| Chris Buck Band | Released: April 21, 2017; Label: Royalty |
| All In | Released: February 8, 2019; Label: Royalty |
| Answers | Released: March 31, 2023; Label: Sakamoto Music |

=== Singles ===
List of singles, with selected chart positions, showing year released and album name
| Title | Year | Peak chart positions | Album |
| Title | Year | CAN Country | Album |
|---|---|---|---|
| "Caribbean Dream" | 2013 | — | Buck Wild |
| "Leave Your Light On" | 2015 | 44 | Chris Buck Band |
| "Giddy Up" | 2015 | 38 | Chris Buck Band |
| "Sun Sets Down" | 2016 | 34 | Chris Buck Band |
| "That's When You Know" (featuring Kira Isabella) | 2017 | 19 | Chris Buck Band |
| "Good Old Days" | 2019 | 33 | All In |
| "Can't Beat the View" | 2022 | — | Answers |
| "Thank God for Good Friends" | 2022 | — | Answers |
| "She Gone" | 2023 | — | Answers |
| "Wild and Free" | 2023 | — | Answers |
| "Cowboy Boots" (featuring Gord Bamford) | 2024 | 55 | Non-album singles |
| "One Two Step" | 2025 | 39 | Non-album singles |
"—" denotes a recording that did not chart or was not released in that territory.

=== Music videos ===
List of music videos, showing year released and directors
| Title | Year | Director(s) |
|---|---|---|
| "Caribbean Dream" | 2014 | Dave McDonald and Jon Thomas |
| "Giddy Up" | 2016 | Dermot King and Jon Thomas |
| "That's When You Know" (featuring Kira Isabella) | 2017 | David McDonald |
| "RDNKN" | 2018 | David McDonald |
| "Can't Beat the View" | 2022 | Stephano Barberis |
| "Thank God for Good Friends" | 2022 | Dave Benedict |
| "She Gone" | 2023 | Chrystal Leigh |

== Awards and nominations ==
| Year | Association | Category | Nominated work | Result | Ref |
|---|---|---|---|---|---|
| 2024 | Canadian Country Music Association | Musical Collaboration of the Year | "Cowboy Boots" (with Gord Bamford) | Nominated | |
