= Songs About You (song) =

Single by Kira Isabella

from the album Love Me Like That
- Released: November 14, 2012
- Genre: Country, country pop
- Length: 3:25
- Label: Legend North / Sony Music Canada
- Songwriter(s): Blair Daly; Hillary Lindsey; Troy Verges
- Producer(s): Jerry Lane; Mark Liggett

Kira Isabella singles chronology
"A Little More Work" (2012)	"Songs About You" (2012)	"Blame It on Your Truck" (2013)

"Songs About You" is a song originally recorded by American country music artist Mindy McCready for her fifth and final studio album I'm Still Here and later recorded by Canadian country music artist Kira Isabella for her debut studio album, Love Me Like That (2012). Written by Blair Daly, Hillary Lindsey, and Troy Verges, it is the only song on the album which Isabella did not co-write. It was sent to Canadian country radio November 14, 2012 through Sony Music Canada as the album's fourth single.

== Content ==
"Songs About You" is a country and country pop ballad with a duration of three minutes and twenty-five seconds. Its instrumentation consists primarily of guitar, while its lyrics tell the story of a girl who moves on from a dead-end relationship and informs the object of her affection that she is "through singing songs about you." The song's confessional nature has been compared to the work of American singer-songwriter Taylor Swift, with Jesse Kinos-Goodin of CBC Music noting that Isablla "certainly has the diary-entry-as-song formula down."

== Critical reception ==
Kayla Tinson at Canadian country music blog Top Country labelled "Songs About You" the highlight of the album, writing that it showcases "a side of Kira we've never seen" and that it is a "brilliantly" written song.

== Music video ==
A lyric video for the song premiered November 11, 2012 through Isabella's Vevo channel in which the song's lyrics are stylized as diary entries.

The official music video for "Songs About You" was directed by Ben Knechtel and premiered exclusively through CMT on November 16, 2012. It was uploaded to her Vevo channel a week later, on November 23. Shot primarily in black-and-white, the video interleaves studio and concert footage of Isabella performing the song with a storyline involving Isabella's character catching her boyfriend cheating on her.

== Chart performance ==
Chart (2013)	Peak position
Canada (Canadian Hot 100)	93
Canada Country (Billboard)	13
