= What Are You Gonna Tell Her? =

Single by Mickey Guyton

from the album Remember Her Name and the EP Bridges
- Released: March 6, 2020
- Genre: Country
- Length: 3:13
- Label: Capitol Nashville
- Songwriters: Mickey Guyton; Victoria Banks; Emma-Lee; Karen Kosowski
- Producer: Karen Kosowski

Mickey Guyton singles chronology
"Heartbreak Song" (2016)	"What Are You Gonna Tell Her?" (2020)	"Black Like Me" (2020)

"What Are You Gonna Tell Her?" is a song written and recorded by American country music artist Mickey Guyton, which was released on March 6, 2020, as the first single from her third EP Bridges and was subsequently included on her debut album Remember Her Name.

== Writing ==
Guyton was inspired to write the song when she met a young woman who had just arrived in Nashville with the intention to pursue a career in country music. She asked Guyton what she had to look forward to about following her dream and Guyton realized that she didn't have a single good thing to tell her. Additionally, while attending a Grammy party in L.A., Guyton remembers looking over at a table of female artists and wondering what they had to go through to achieve success in the male-dominated music industry. Of these two events, Guyton explained that “I remember thinking to myself, ‘We don’t own ourselves’. We are the change in these people's pocketbooks, and we are sacrificing everything for this.”

Following the Grammys, Guyton flew back to Nashville for a songwriting session with Canadian artists Victoria Banks, Emma-Lee and Karen Kosowski. The four women started sharing stories of the difficulties they've experienced as women in both the music industry and the wider world which eventually resulted in the writing of "What Are You Gonna Tell Her?" Of the song, Banks stated that “I remember thinking ‘Oh man, radio is never going to play that.’ Then I was like, ‘I don’t care, because it’s more important to say it.” After completing the song, Guyton considered whether this was the end of her career in country music as she did not believe a song so raw would be accepted and, after ten years in Nashville, she still struggled to understand what the genre wanted her to be.

Speaking on the song, Guyton explained “I was trying so hard to fit into the stereotype of what country music is, that I forgot why I fell in love with country music. We’ve been in this period where it’s all about having a good time and drinking and girls. It’s so heavily male-dominated that I don’t hear myself, and I don’t see myself within it anymore. Country music is three chords and the truth. So I wrote my truth.”

== Content ==
Lyrically, the song is a ballad about gender discrimination, criticizing the injustices brought upon young women, people of color and children with big dreams. The chorus asks four simple yet devastating questions: "What are you gonna tell her when she’s wrong?/Will you just shrug and say it’s been that way all along?/What are you gonna tell her when she figures out/That all this time you built her up just so the world can let her down? What are you gonna tell her".

== Live performances ==
Guyton performed the song at the Country Radio Seminar in February 2020, where she received a standing ovation. Reviewers called the song "powerful and "transcendent", with Guyton's co-writer Victoria Banks tweeting “I'm still shaking. We wrote this three weeks ago from the gut. Today I watched [Guyton] bring the Ryman full of radio execs to their feet with it. God bless her for being brave enough. It was like she reached up and grabbed a giant elephant that we know is in the room, then pulled it down and showed it to everyone.”

On September 16, 2020, Guyton performed "What Are You Gonna Tell Her?" on stage at the Grand Ole Opry House as part of the 55th Academy of Country Music Awards with host Keith Urban backing her on piano. Guyton's performance made history as the first black woman to perform her own song solo at the ACM Awards (Rhianna previously dueted with Jennifer Nettles in 2011 and Valerie June appeared alongside Eric Church in 2013).

Guyton performed the song alongside "Remember Her Name" at the 2022 ESPY Awards on July 20, 2022 in order to celebrate the 50th anniversary of the Title IX legislation. Preceding her performance was a speech from tennis legend Billie Jean King, with several female athletes including Lisa Leslie, Brandi Chastain, Carolyn Peck, Jocelyn Alo, Layshia Clarendon, Chloe Kim, Oksana Masters, Allyson Felix, Aly Raisman and Megan Rapinoe appearing during the song to discuss the progress that still has to be made for women in sports.

== Chart performance ==
Chart (2020)	Peak position
US Country Digital Song Sales (Billboard)	18
