= Caffeine & Big Dreams =

Studio album by Kira Isabella
- Released: October 14, 2014
- Genre: Country
- Length: 39:11
- Label: Sony Music Canada
- Producers: Mark Liggett; Jerry Lane

Kira Isabella chronology
Love Me Like That (2012)	Caffeine & Big Dreams (2014)	Side A (2018)

Singles from Caffeine & Big Dreams
- 1. "Quarterback" Released: March 25, 2014; 2. "Gone Enough" Released: August 2014; 3. "Shake It If Ya Got It" Released: January 2015

Caffeine & Big Dreams is the second studio album by Canadian country music artist Kira Isabella. It was released on October 14, 2014, via Sony Music Canada. The album includes the singles "Quarterback", "Gone Enough" and "Shake It If Ya Got It".

== Critical reception ==
Shenieka Russell-Metcalf of Top Country called the album "amazing," writing that it "shows off Kira's matured voice, growth as an artist and proves yet again that she is full of so much talent."

== Track listing ==
No.	Title	Writer(s)	Length
1.	"Shake It If Ya Got It"	Kira Isabella, Eliot Sloan, Jason Phelps	3:18
2.	"Gone Enough"	Isabella, Deric Ruttan, Chris DuBois	3:14
3.	"Quarterback"	Bobby Hamrick, Rivers Rutherford, Marti Dodson	3:29
4.	"Coke Can"	Nicolle Galyon, Emily Lynch	3:20
5.	"Hey Love"	Isabella, Marti Frederiksen, Rebecca Lynn Howard	3:09
6.	"Ring Around It"	Isabella, Walt Aldridge, Phelps	4:03
7.	"Make a Sinner Out of Me"	Isabella, Aldridge, Phelps	4:18
8.	"A Night Like This"	Isabella, Kevin Fox, Phelps	3:43
9.	"Country's Written All Over Me"	Isabella, Larry Lange, Phelps	3:50
10.	"Late Bloomer"	Isabella, David Thomson	3:19
11.	"Heaven"	Todd Clark, Mallary Hope	3:28
Total length:			39:11
