= The Best Day (Taylor Swift song) =

2008 song by Taylor Swift

Song by Taylor Swift

from the album Fearless
- Released: November 11, 2008
- Genre: Folk rock
- Length: 4:05
- Label: Big Machine
- Songwriter: Taylor Swift
- Producers: Taylor Swift; Nathan Chapman

Music video
- "The Best Day" on YouTube

"The Best Day (Taylor's Version)"

Song by Taylor Swift

from the album Fearless (Taylor's Version)
- Released: April 9, 2021
- Studio: Blackbird (Nashville); Kitty Committee (London); Prime Recording (Nashville)
- Length: 4:05
- Label: Republic
- Songwriter: Taylor Swift
- Producers: Taylor Swift; Christopher Rowe

Music video
- "The Best Day (Taylor's Version)" on YouTube

"The Best Day" is a song written and recorded by the American singer-songwriter Taylor Swift for her second studio album, Fearless (2008). Produced by Swift and Nathan Chapman, "The Best Day" is an understated folk rock song with a country rock arrangement, with lyrics dedicated to Swift's parents, most of the verses being to her mother. A music video containing home footage edited by Swift was released on May 1, 2009, as part of a special Mother's Day promotion through Big Machine Records.

Music critics praised "The Best Day" for its understated production and tender sentiments. The song peaked at number three on the Bubbling Under Hot 100 Singles chart, and 56 on Billboard's Hot Country Songs chart. The Recording Industry Association of America (RIAA) in July 2018 certified the track gold, denoting 500,000 units based on sales and stream.

Swift released a re-recorded version, "The Best Day (Taylor's Version)", as part of her re-recorded album Fearless (Taylor's Version), on April 9, 2021. A new music video for "The Best Day (Taylor's Version)", was uploaded onto YouTube on the album's release date. The re-recorded version also charted on the US Bubbling Under Hot 100 and Hot Country Songs charts, and won Best Family Feature at the 2021 CMT Music Awards.

== Background and writing ==
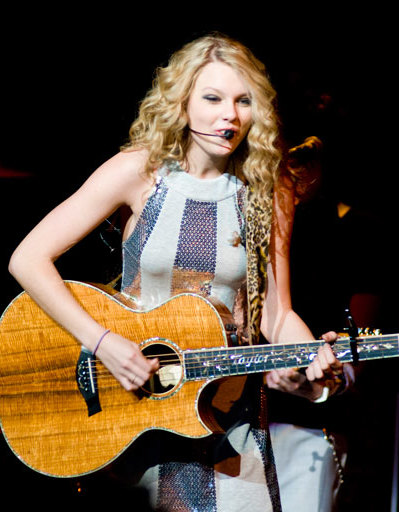
Swift wrote "The Best Day" while touring in summer 2008 and recorded it in secret to surprise her mother on Christmas.

Taylor Swift released her second studio album, Fearless, on November 11, 2008, through Big Machine Records. Swift wrote or co-wrote all tracks and co-produced the album with Nathan Chapman. Although much of Fearless is primarily about the challenges of love from a teenage girl's perspectives, a few songs are about life lessons and family love.

Swift wrote "The Best Day" for Fearless while she was touring in summer 2008 and recorded it in secret. She dedicated the track to her family for their support of her music career, the emphasis being her mother. For the lyrics, she revisited her childhood memories and imagined what language she would use as a child, incorporating the same language into the songwriting. Swift recorded "The Best Day" and edited an accompanying home video without telling her mother Andrea so as to surprise her on Christmas. Swift's mother recalled that when her daughter showed her the song and the video on Christmas Eve, "that's when I lost it. And [...] I've lost it pretty much every time I've heard that song since." The track, as appeared on Fearless, was produced by Swift and Chapman.

== Release ==
"The Best Day" is track number 12 on Fearless, released on November 11, 2008. Swift released her self-edited video for "The Best Day" on May 1, 2009, in celebration of Mother's Day and as part of a special promotion through Big Machine Records. The video features footage of Swift's family and childhood, featuring her parents and brother Austin.

After signing a new contract with Republic Records, Swift began re-recording her first six studio albums in November 2020. The decision came after a 2019 public dispute between Swift and the talent manager Scooter Braun, who acquired Big Machine Records, including the masters of Swift's albums the label had released. By re-recording them, Swift had full ownership of the new masters, including the copyright licensing of her songs, devaluing the Big Machine-owned masters.

The re-recording of "The Best Day", subtitled "Taylor's Version", was released as part of Fearless's re-recording, Fearless (Taylor's Version), on April 9, 2021. The re-recorded version was produced by Swift and Christopher Rowe. On April 30, 2021, Swift released a four-minute music video for "The Best Day (Taylor's Version)", consisting of footage from home movies from Swift's childhood to young adulthood, also starring her parents and brother. The video won Best Family Feature at the 2021 CMT Music Awards.

== Music and lyrics ==
"The Best Day" is an understated folk rock song. The track originally featured mandolin and Dobro, but Swift told the producing team to mute all of them because she wanted the song to be as simple as possible. The end product, according to the Chicago Tribune, incorporates a "coffeehouse folkish beat". It is built on gentle acoustic guitar strums. The musicologist James E. Perone remarked that "The Best Day" features a country rock arrangement that recalls the music of the American rock band Eagles. The song uses the '50s progression, I–vi–IV–V, which is associated with many American pop songs from the 1950s; Perone argued that this quality lent "The Best Day" a timeless feel.

Swift wrote "The Best Day" as a tribute to her parents over the years; the focus of the song is her mother, and her father is mentioned in the middle eight. There is also a mention of Swift's brother Austin with the lyrics saying, "inside and out he is better than I am." In the liner notes of Fearless, the secret message in the song's lyrics is "God Bless Andrea Swift". (Note: The "secret messages" of Swift's songs are decoded by identifying certain capitalized letters in each song's lyrics, printed in the album booklet, to spell out a certain word or phrase.) Set in fall, the song narrates Swift's relationship with her mother, featuring memories when she was three, five, and 13. The narrator mentions moments they spent together involving paint sets, pumpkin patches, and window-shopping. The lyrics feature many imagery associated with fall, such as "the pumpkin patch", "tractor rides", and "the sky is gold". Consistent with Fearless's frequent references to fairy tales, "The Best Day" mentions Snow White and princesses in the lyrics.

According to the journalist Jody Rosen, the "goody-two-shoes" track "The Best Day" is one of a few songs on Fearless not dealing with romantic themes. GQ opined that Swift might have been inspired to write the song by an incident in middle school. Swift was rejected by a group of friends to go to a local mall together, and after her mother took her to the same mall, she saw the said friends at a Victoria's Secret store. Swift recalled that her mother later took her to the King of Prussia Mall to stay away from such friends, "My mom let me escape from certain things that were too painful to deal with." In Pitchfork, Hazel Cills observed that the song is told from an underdog perspective, which continued on many of Swift's later songs.

== Reception ==
Perone remarked that "The Best Day" is a Fearless track that demonstrated Swift's talent as "an introspective, real emotion-driven singer-songwriter", contrary to other album tracks that feature a market-oriented production. In The Village Voice, Josh Love picked it as one of the album's great songs that display "preternatural wisdom and inclusiveness". James Reed of The Boston Globe called "The Best Day" the best song on Fearless, opining that the understated production highlighting the emotional sentiments makes the track a refreshing listen "after an entire album of wide-open choruses". Reed wrote, "If the melody doesn't stick in your mind, the message at least speaks to the heart."

In a Billboard 2017 retrospective of Fearless, Jennifer Keishin Armstrong wrote that although Swift wrote "The Best Day" when she was 18, the track displayed her songwriting maturity beyond her years, "with the nostalgia, wisdom and sap of a 40-year-old". Paste's Jane Song wrote: "It's so unfair that people accuse Taylor of only writing songs about boys when one of her most affecting love songs is about her mom." Slant Magazine's Jonathan Keefe called "The Best Day" one of the most charming songs on Fearless, comparing it to George Strait's 2000 song of the same name. Rob Sheffield of Rolling Stone described it as a "weapons-grade tearjerker and not to be trifled with in a public place".

After Fearless was released in 2008, "The Best Day" peaked at number three on the Bubbling Under Hot 100 Singles chart. Despite not being released to country radio, it charted at number 56 on Hot Country Songs. In 2018, the Recording Industry Association of America (RIAA) certified "The Best Day" gold for surpassing 500,000 units based on sales and streaming. Upon the release of Fearless (Taylor's Version) in 2021, "The Best Day (Taylor's Version)" peaked at number 19 on the Bubbling Under Hot 100 Singles and number 45 on the Hot Country Songs chart.

== Live performances ==
Swift included "The Best Day" to the set list of her concerts in Evansville, Indiana (April 2009) and Moline, Illinois (May 2010) as part of the Fearless Tour. She sang the song again as part of an acoustic segment on the Cleveland, Ohio concert of the Red Tour in April 2013. Swift sang the song at the Santa Clara, California concert of her Reputation Stadium Tour in May 2018; it was dedicated to her mother and opening act Camila Cabello's mother. The song was included as a "surprise song" at the May 14, 2023, Philadelphia concert of the Eras Tour.

== Personnel ==
"The Best Day" (2008)

- Taylor Swift – vocals, writer, producer
- Nathan Chapman – producer
- Drew Bollman – assistant mixer
- Chad Carlson – recording engineer
- Justin Niebank – mixer

"The Best Day (Taylor's Version)" (2021)

- Taylor Swift – lead vocals, writer, producer
- Christopher Rowe – vocal recording, producer
- Matt Billingslea – drums
- Derek Garten – additional engineer
- Serban Ghenea – mixing
- John Hanes – engineer
- Amos Heller – bass guitar
- Mike Meadows – acoustic guitar
- David Payne – recording
- Lowell Reynolds – assistant recording engineer

== Charts ==
=== "The Best Day" ===
Chart positions
Chart (2008–2009)	Peak position
US Bubbling Under Hot 100 (Billboard)	3
US Hot Country Songs (Billboard)	56

=== "The Best Day (Taylor's Version)" ===
Chart positions
Chart (2021)	Peak position
US Bubbling Under Hot 100 Singles (Billboard)	19
US Hot Country Songs (Billboard)	45

== Certification ==
Certifications
Region	Certification	Certified units/sales
United States (RIAA)	Gold	500,000^{‡}
^{‡} Sales+streaming figures based on certification alone.
