= Heaven Down Here =

Single by Mickey Guyton

from the EP Bridges
- Released: July 24, 2020
- Genre: Country
- Length: 3:33
- Label: Capitol Nashville
- Songwriters: Mickey Guyton; Josh Kear; Hillary Lindsey; Gordie Sampson
- Producer: Karen Kosowski

Mickey Guyton singles chronology
"Black Like Me" (2020)	"Heaven Down Here" (2020)	"Boys" (2020)

"Heaven Down Here"' is a song by American country music artist Mickey Guyton. The song was composed by Guyton, along with Josh Kear, Hillary Lindsey and Gordie Sampson. The track was produced by Karen Kosowski. "Heaven Down Here" was released as the third single off her 2020 extended play, Bridges. It received acclaim from critics and also featured a corresponding music video.

== Background and content ==
Mickey Guyton had early success in 2015 with the top 40 hit, "Better Than You Left Me." After several years of limited success, she released the 2020 single, "Black Like Me." The song became a viral success in the wake of the Black Lives Matter and George Floyd protests. "Heaven Down Here" has a similar story concept that discusses racism and inequities. The song is written as a prayer to a higher power in which Guyton asks for comfort during challenging times. Guyton had written the track during the beginning of the COVID-19 pandemic and "watching the world burn down." After composing the track, she said she felt a "renewed sense of self." Guyton composed the track with songwriters, Josh Kear, Hillary Lindsey and Gordie Sampson. The song was produced by Karen Kosowski.

== Critical reception ==
"Heaven Down Here" received mixed reviews from music critics and journalists. Carena Liptak of Taste of Country commented that it "tells a powerful and timely story of a world in crisis -- and asks God to send a little bit of Heaven down to earth." Zachary Kephart of Country Universe disliked the song's production, calling it "lacking" and "clunky." Kephart also did not like the song's overall concept: "I’m not sold on framing “Heaven Down Here” through the God paradigm on an album about understanding others’ differences," he wrote. Meanwhile, Off the Record called the track "stunning" in their review of Guyton's 2020 EP, Bridges. "The track is a moving reminder of the emotions that many will have felt this year, as Guyton entreats God to send some Heaven to Earth," the publication wrote.

== Release and music video ==
"Heaven Down Here" was released as a single via Capitol Records Nashville on July 24, 2020. The song was later released on Guyton's 2020 extended play on Capitol Nashville titled, Bridges. A music video was later released in October 2020 that was directed by Sarah McColgan. The video featured footage of front line workers in the COVID-19 pandemic and large crowds protesting in response to the 2020 Black Lives Matter and George Floyd protests. In an interview with Country Music Television, Guyton explained that the video was intended to give viewers a message of hope.

== Track listing ==
2020 digital download and streaming

- "Heaven Down Here" – 3:33
