= Unbreakable (Mickey Guyton EP) =

EP by Mickey Guyton
- Released: January 1, 2014
- Genre: Acoustic; Country
- Label: Capitol Nashville
- Producer: Nathan Champan

Mickey Guyton chronology
Unbreakable (2014)	Mickey Guyton (2015)

Unbreakable is an extended play by American country music artist Mickey Guyton. It was released on January 1, 2014 via Capitol Records Nashville and contained four tracks. Unbreakable was the debut album collection by Guyton and consisted of acoustic musical instrumentation. The album would receive positive reviews and reach positions on a music publication chart.

== Background and content ==
After receiving a recognition performing a special concert at the White House, Mickey Guyton received a recording contract from Capitol Records Nashville in 2012. Unbreakable would be Guyton's first release from the label. The extended play contained a total of four tracks, all of which were co-composed by Guyton herself. The album was a collection of acoustically-produced country songs. Instrumentation featured on the album included drums, fiddle, banjo and mandolin. Some of the songs rely on one specific acoustic instrument as its main focus. This included the opening track, "Forever Love," which mainly consists of banjo accompaniment. The final track, "Safe," includes only an acoustic guitar.

== Release and reception ==
Professional ratings
Review scores
Source	Rating
Hits Daily Double	Favorable
Queens of Country	4.5/5 stars

Unbreakable was released on January 1, 2014 via Capitol Records Nashville. It was issued to streaming and digital downloading services, such as Apple Music. The EP spent one week on the Billboard Top Heatseekers chart, peaking at number 14 in March 2014. It was Guyton's first charting album on the survey.

Unbreakable received positive reviews following its release. Hits Daily Double called the EP "a solid country-pop effort that showcased her potential." Country Standard Time highlighted her vocals, yet called the album "a very much under the radar EP." Queens of Country rated the extended play at four and half stars, praising its acoustic arrangement and song selection. Writers also mentioned how Unbreakable provides a lead-up to Guyton's first single release: "Overall, this EP was a great introduction to Guyton. This EP is a collage of different topics that all seem to fit together in one story that leads up to her debut single...this EP is a story of empowerment, overcoming odds and enjoying life despite the bullets it may shoot at you."

== Track listing ==
Unbreakable
No.	Title	Writer(s)	Length
1.	"Forever Love"	Jeff Cohen; Ross Copperman; Mickey Guyton	3:31
2.	"Pretty Little Mustang"	Guyton; Hillary Lindsey; Jeremy Spillman	3:43
3.	"Safe"	Mike Busbee; Guyton; Julian Raymond	4:01
4.	"Unbreakable"	Blake Bollinger; Guyton; Kylie Sackley	3:35

== Personnel ==
All credits are adapted from Allmusic.

- Mickey Guyton – primary artist

== Charts ==
Chart (2014)	Peak position
US Heatseekers Albums (Billboard)	14

== Release history ==
Region	Date	Format	Label	Ref.
United States	January 1, 2014	Digital download; streaming	Capitol Records Nashville	
