= Kira Isabella =

Canadian country music singer

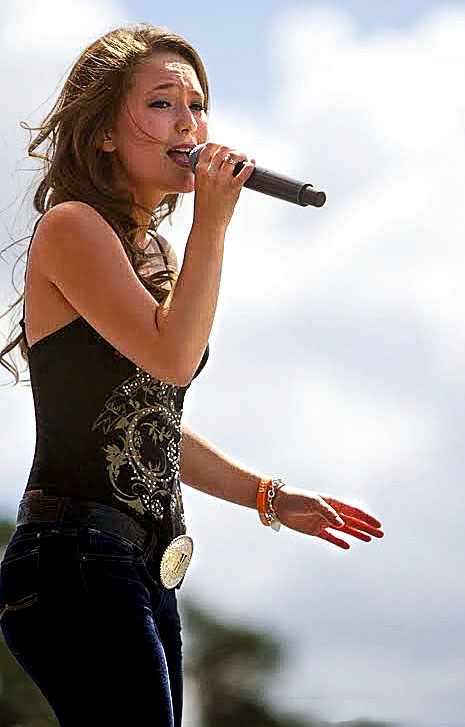
- Kira Isabella performing at the Boots and Hearts Music Festival 2013

Background information
- Born: Kira Isabella Wilkie; September 18, 1993 (age 32); Ottawa, Ontario, Canada
- Genres: Country
- Occupations: Singer, songwriter
- Years active: 2010–present
- Labels: Sony Music, Hitshop Records

Kira Isabella Wilkie (born September 18, 1993) is a Canadian country music artist. Isabella was signed to Sony Music in 2009. Her first single, "Love Me Like That", was released in 2011 and charted on the Canadian Hot 100. Isabella released her second single in 2011 entitled "A Real Good Radio". Her third single, "A Little More Work", was released in 2012. Her debut studio album, Love Me Like That, was released in October 2012, and produced two further singles. Kira Isabella announced dates for a 2013 Canadian tour with Terri Clark in October 2012 and Carrie Underwood in December 2012. In 2013, Isabella signed with U.S. record label HitShop Records. The lead single from her second album, "Quarterback", was released in spring 2014.

== Early life ==
Kira Isabella began singing and playing the guitar at 7 years old, under the tutelage of her father and her singing teacher Trina Langthorne. Her ethnic background is Colombian. She was inspired by fellow Canadian country singer Shania Twain and her then recent album, Up!, to enter the country music industry. Her songwriting began development through writing poetry, beginning in the fourth grade. At the age of 14, Kira Isabella won the Rising Star Award in the Female Open Category of a Blyth, Ontario, arts festival. The consequential media exposure that led well-known music producers to Kira Isabella would help launch her career as a country singer.

== Influences ==
Female country singers such as Faith Hill, Sheryl Crow, Shania Twain and Taylor Swift have been cited by Kira Isabella as strong musical influences.

== Tours and festivals ==
To date, Kira Isabella has performed as a guest singer on two tours. From October to December 2012, she has worked with Carrie Underwood on her Blown Away Tour and in 2013, with Terri Clark. She will have performed in the Boots and Hearts Music Festival line-up for two years consecutively by August 2013. Her first headlining show was June 30, 2013 in Calabogie, Ontario at the Calabogie Country Music Fest. She also performed at the free biweekly Peterborough Musicfest on July 31, 2013.

== Discography ==
=== Studio albums ===
Title	Details
Love Me Like That	Release date: October 2, 2012; Label: Sony Music Canada
Caffeine & Big Dreams	Release date: October 14, 2014; Label: Sony Music Canada
Sides	Release date: March 15, 2019; Label: Creator Brand

=== Extended plays ===
Title	Details
Side A	Release date: November 23, 2018; Label: Creator Brand
Side B	Release date: January 11, 2019; Label: Creator Brand

=== Singles ===
Year	Single	Peak chart positions		Album
Year	Single	CAN Country	CAN	Album
2011	"Love Me Like That"	11	99	Love Me Like That
2011	"A Real Good Radio"	22	—	Love Me Like That
2012	"A Little More Work"	5	68	Love Me Like That
2012	"Songs About You"	13	93	Love Me Like That
2013	"Blame It on Your Truck"	18	—	Love Me Like That
2014	"Quarterback"	10	79	Caffeine & Big Dreams
2014	"Gone Enough"	10	—	Caffeine & Big Dreams
2015	"Shake It If Ya Got It"	19	—	Caffeine & Big Dreams
2016	"I'm So Over Getting Over You"	17	—	Non-album singles
2017	"Missing You"	—	—	Non-album singles
2018	"I Don't Wanna Know"	—	—	Sides
2018	"Little Girl"	14	—	Sides
2018	"Danger Danger"	44	—	Sides
2019	"We Should Be Together" (featuring Levi Hummon)	42	—	Sides
2019	"Soon"	—	—	Sides
"—" denotes releases that did not chart

=== Featured singles ===
Year	Single	Peak chart positions	Album
Year	Single	CAN Country	Album
2017	"That's When You Know" (with Chris Buck Band)	19	Chris Buck Band

=== Christmas singles ===
Year	Single	Peak chart positions		Album
Year	Single	CAN Country	CAN AC	Album
2013	"A Country Boy for Christmas"	38	—	Non-album singles
2014	"Baby, It's Cold Outside" (with Tyler Shaw)	—	31	Non-album singles

=== Music videos ===
Year	Video	Director
2011	"Love Me Like That"	Sean Danby
2011	"A Real Good Radio"	Jordan Eady
2012	"A Little More Work"	Ben Knechtel
2012	"Songs About You"	Ben Knechtel
2013	"Little White Church"	Ben Knechtel
2014	"Quarterback"	RT!
2014	"Gone Enough"	RT!
2015	"Shake It If Ya Got It"	Ally Pankiw
2016	"I'm So Over Getting Over You"	Emma Higgins
2018	"I Don't Wanna Know" (acoustic)	Ted Ellis

== Awards ==
Year	Nominee / work	Award	Result
2016	Kira Isabella	Canadian Country Music Association Female Artist of the Year	Nominated
2015	Kira Isabella	Canadian Country Music Association Female Artist of the Year	Nominated
2015	Caffeine & Big Dreams	Juno Award for Country Album of the Year	Nominated
2014	Kira Isabella	Canadian Country Music Association Female Artist of the Year	Nominated
2013	Kira Isabella	Canadian Country Music Association Female Artist of the Year	Won
2013	"A Little More Work"	Canadian Country Music Association CMT Video of the Year	Nominated
2013	Kira Isabella	Juno Award for Breakthrough Artist of the Year	Nominated
2012	Kira Isabella	Canadian Country Music Association Rising Star Award	Won
2017	"That's When You Know" (with Chris Buck Band)	Canadian Country Music Association Video of the Year	Nominated
