= Bridges (EP) =

EP by Mickey Guyton
- Released: September 11, 2020
- Genre: Country pop
- Length: 19:00
- Label: Capitol Nashville
- Producer: Nathan Chapman; Karen Kosowski; Forest Whitehead

Mickey Guyton chronology
Mickey Guyton (2015)	Bridges (2020)	Remember Her Name (2021)

Singles from Bridges
- 1. "What Are You Gonna Tell Her?" Released: March 6, 2020; 2. "Black Like Me" Released: June 2, 2020; 3. "Heaven Down Here" Released: July 24, 2020

Bridges is an extended play by American country music artist Mickey Guyton. It was released on September 11, 2020 via Capitol Records Nashville and contained six tracks. The EP was produced by Nathan Chapman, Karen Kosowski and Forest Whitehead. Bridges was Guyton's first EP release in five years and includes three singles that reflected her recent musical shift and recent events involving the COVID-19 pandemic and the various Black Lives Matter protests. The EP received positive reviews following its release and also charted Billboard's Top Heatseekers chart.

== Background ==
At the time of Bridges' release, Mickey Guyton had not released an extended play in over five years. Guyton used this period to reflect on her musical identity. In an interview with The Washington Post, Guyton felt as if she was not being true to herself when she first began releasing music in 2014. She explained that her initial results in Nashville did not go to her expectations, which made her realize she needed to speak her truth. She started writing songs that reflected her experiences as a woman and a person of color working in the country music industry. Guyton composed material for Bridges over the course of two years that reflected her recent experiences. She collaborated with new songwriters, such as Josh Kear and Jesse Frasure.

== Content and recording ==
Andrea Williams of the Nashville Scene described the content of Bridges as doubling "down on her desire to build a better world through her art." Jessica Nicholson of Music Row stated that she "dives deep into her own experiences, hopes, and grave disappointments as a Black female artist" in her description of the EP's content. The EP included four tracks produced by Karen Kosowski. One track was produced by Nathan Chapman and Forest Whitehead while a second track was co-produced by Kosowski and Whitehead. Kosowski also co-wrote three of the album's tracks while Chapman wrote one track. Guyton co-wrote all six tracks.

Bridges contains a total of six new tracks. Included on the EP is "What Are You Gonna Tell Her?", a song Guyton released earlier in the year, as well as "Black Like Me" a song that Guyton had first written in 2019. The song was inspired by the book of the same name and discusses the experiences of Guyton growing up as a black woman. Other songs on the album focus on different themes, such as "Rosé", which Taste of Country called "a drinking song for the women."

== Critical reception ==
Professional ratings
Review scores
Source	Rating
Music Row	Favorable
Nashville Scene	Favorable
Off the Record	Favorable
Sounds Like Nashville	Favorable

Bridges received positive reviews from critics and journalists. Lauren Laffer of Sounds Like Nashville called it "Guyton's most powerful and moving work to date." Andrea Williams of the Nashville Scene called it "classic Guyton" in relation to its production. Williams also commented on the album's material in comparison to music by other country performers: "The fact that a mainstream country artist can spend four tracks of six on an EP talking about anything other than breakups and beer is remarkable. Even "Rosé," Guyton's ode to the pink drink of choice for so many women, is less fluffy than it seems."

Jessica Nicholson of Music Row praised the effort as well: "Mickey Guyton serves up six rounds of bold, elegant, emotionally nuanced music on the new EP—with more strength, fervor, wisdom, vocal and political prowess—and yes, playfulness—than many full-fledged albums." Off the Record found that the album showcased a type of authenticity that was missing from current country music: "Simply put, Guyton’s EP is where country music needs to be in 2020, documenting the real human experience...This EP breaks your heart, puts it back together and helps you find peace all in one project."

== Release and chart performance ==
Prior to the EP's release, Guyton had performed "What Are You Gonna Tell Her?" at the Country Radio Seminar in Nashville, Tennessee. It was Guyton's first radio seminar appearance since 2015. The song was released as a single on March 6, 2020. On June 6, 2020, Guyton released the second single off the EP, "Black Like Me". Guyton had originally intended to release it via promotion and marketing. However, following the George Floyd protests and the Black Lives Matter protests, she decided it to release it via social media. Eventually, the song was picked by streaming sites such as Spotify, who included it on their country playlist. On July 24, 2020, "Heaven Down Here" was released as the album's third single. Bridges was officially released on September 11, 2020 via Capitol Records Nashville. It was Guyton's third extended play to chart on the Billboard Top Heatseekers survey, where it reached number 23.

== Track listing ==
Bridges
No.	Title	Writer(s)	Length
1.	"Heaven Down Here"	Mickey Guyton; Josh Kear; Hillary Lindsey; Gordie Sampson	3:34
2.	"Bridges"	Victoria Banks; Emma-Lee; Guyton; Karen Kosowski	3:05
3.	"What Are You Gonna Tell Her?"	Banks; Emma-Lee; Guyton; Kosowski	3:13
4.	"Rosé"	Banks; Guyton; Kosowski	2:55
5.	"Salt"	Cary Barlowe; Jesse Frasure; Guyton; Steven Lee Olsen	2:39
6.	"Black Like Me"	Nathan Chapman; Fraser Churchill; Emma Louise Davidson-Dillon; Guyton	3:32
Total length:			19:00

== Personnel ==
All credits for Bridges are adapted from Allmusic.

Musical personnel

- Victoria Banks – Background vocals
- Nathan Chapman – Bass, piano, steel guitar
- Eddy Dunlap – Pedal steel guitar
- Jesse Frasure – Piano
- Mickey Guyton – Background vocals, lead vocals,
- Evan Hutchings – Drums
- Karen Kosowski – Acoustic guitar, background vocals, electric guitar, synthesizer
- Miles McPherson – Drums
- Steven Lee Olsen – Background vocals
- Marc Rogers – Bass, bass guitar, double bass, electric guitar, synthesizer bass
- Gordie Sampson – Organ
- Justin Schipper – Pedal steel guitar
- Derek Wells – Acoustic guitar, banjo, electric guitar, mandolin, pedal steel guitar, slide guitar
- Forest Whitehead – Acoustic guitar, banjo, bass, electric guitar, keyboards, piano

Technical personnel

- Chad Carlson – Engineer
- Nathan Chapman – Drum programming, engineering, producer
- Jesse Frasure – Programming
- Serban Ghenea – Mixing
- John Hanes – Engineer
- Scott Johnson – Production coordination
- Karen Kosowski – Editing, engineer, mixing, producer, programming
- Jason Massey – Strings
- Miles McPherson – Engineer, percussion
- Michael Mechling – Assistant engineer
- Andrew Mendelson – Mastering engineer
- Gordie Sampson – Programming
- Justin Schipper – Engineer
- F. Reid Schippen – Engineer, mixing
- Derek Wells – Engineer
- Forest Whitehead – Drum programming, engineer, producer

== Charts ==
Chart (2020)	Peak position
US Heatseekers Albums (Billboard)	23

== Release history ==
Region	Date	Format	Label	Ref.
United States	September 11, 2020	Digital download; streaming	Capitol Records Nashville	
