= Quarterback (song) =

Single by Kira Isabella

from the album Caffeine & Big Dreams
- Released: March 25, 2014
- Genre: Country
- Length: 3:29
- Label: Legend North, HitShop
- Songwriter(s): Rivers Rutherford; Bobby Hamrick; Marti Dodson
- Producer(s): Mark Liggett; Jerry Lane

Kira Isabella singles chronology
| "Blame It on Your Truck" (2013) | "Quarterback" (2014) | "Gone Enough" (2014) |

"Quarterback" is a song recorded by Canadian country music artist Kira Isabella. It was written by Rivers Rutherford, Bobby Hamrick, and Marti Dodson, and was produced by Mark Liggett and Jerry Lane. The song was first released in Canada through Legend North (under license to Sony Music Canada) on March 25, 2014 as the lead single from Isabella's second studio album, Caffeine & Big Dreams.

== Background and release ==
During the initial writing, "Quarterback" was to take a lighter approach, comparing the protective qualities of a linebacker to the more glamorous quarterback position. After discussing rape scandals surrounding university football teams in recent years, the co-writers made the decision to pursue a darker storyline. The song was originally planned to be pitched to Carrie Underwood, who had previously tackled tough subjects in such singles as "Temporary Home" and "Blown Away". It was not passed along to her, however, as one of her associates suggested that Underwood recording the song would be inappropriate due to her romantic history with Dallas Cowboys quarterback Tony Romo. The song then caught the attention of Kira Isabella's management team, who believed the song could work for her. Though written as a first-person narrative in the demo version, the songwriters opted to re-write "Quarterback" in the third person to avoid leading listeners to believe the story came from Isabella's personal experience.

"Quarterback" was released in Canada through Legend North on March 25, 2014. In the US, the song was released to digital retailers through HitShop Records on April 1, 2014, and was serviced to country radio on May 19, 2014. "Quarterback" marks Isabella's first US release after signing to HitShop Records in late 2013.

== Content ==
"It’s not about a quarterback... It’s about somebody who has any kind of power taking advantage of somebody who doesn’t."

-Isabella, on the song's extended metaphor.

"Quarterback" tells the story of a vulnerable "no name" girl who gets publicly taken advantage of by the eponymous football star and the embarrassment she feels in a small town where everybody knows about it. According to MusicRow magazine, the song deals with the aftermath of date rape. The song also tackles the modern social issue of cyberbullying, which is harassing or humiliating others through the Internet, as evidenced by the lines "She always heard that a girls first time / Is a memory she'll never forget / She found out the hard way about love / When she saw those pictures on the internet."

A country ballad, "Quarterback" begins with a "delicate" guitar, while the main melody is built around a string arrangement and ominous cello score. Producer Mark Liggett hired three musicians and stacked their parts to resemble a full string section.

== Critical reception ==
Country music blog Taste of Country compared the arrangement of the song to the music of The Dixie Chicks, and praised Isabella for "[facing] a very real problem head on" and for boldly conveying a story "not yet told in country music." Spin magazine hailed "Quarterback" as the best country song of 2014: "This is country music," writes Andrew Soto, "The more familiar the stories, the worse they sound." Soto praised both the writers and Isabella as a performer, noting that "it helps Isabella's performance that she isn't the most commanding presence: She sings like the "no-name girl from the freshman class" whose life is destroyed [in the song]." Charles Aaron at Wondering Sound similarly labelled "Quarterback" the "most powerful" song of 2014, adding that he considered it "an obvious, immediate hit" upon first hearing the song. He praised the "concisely-written, unexpected" plot, the production ("every musical element complements the story masterfully," writes Aaron), and Isabella's performance ("[her] effortless, sly quaver is transfixing").

== Chart performance ==
| Chart (2014) | Peak position |
|---|---|
| Canada (Canadian Hot 100) | 79 |
| Canada Country (Billboard) | 10 |

== Release history ==
| Country | Date | Label | Format |
|---|---|---|---|
| Canada | March 25, 2014 | Sony Music Canada | Digital download |
| United States | April 1, 2014 | HitShop Records | Digital download |
| United States | May 19, 2014 | HitShop Records | Country radio airplay |
