= Mickey Guyton (EP) =

EP by Mickey Guyton
- Released: May 26, 2015
- Genre: Country pop
- Length: 16:04
- Label: Capitol Nashville
- Producer: Nathan Chapman; Dann Huff; Luke Laird

Mickey Guyton chronology
Unbreakable (2014)	Mickey Guyton (2015)	Bridges (2020)

Singles from Mickey Guyton
- 1. "Better Than You Left Me" Released: January 12, 2015

Mickey Guyton is a self-titled extended play by American country music artist, Mickey Guyton. It was released on May 26, 2015, via Capitol Records Nashville and consisted of four tracks. The EP was co-produced by Nathan Chapman and Dann Huff. It was the second extended play released in Guyton's career and contained the charting single, "Better Than You Left Me." The EP itself would reach charting positions on music publication charts following its release.

== Background and content ==
In 2011, Mickey Guyton signed a recording contract with Capitol Records Nashville. In 2014, she released an extended play of acoustic material, but her self-titled EP would be the first that included proper record production. The record was co-produced by Nathan Chapman, Dann Huff and songwriter Luke Laird. Laird also contributed to the writing of the EP's track, "Somebody Else Will." Consisting of four tracks, two include songwriting credits from Guyton, notably "Better Than You Left Me." Guyton co-wrote these tracks with fellow songwriters Hillary Lindsey, Jennifer Hanson, Jenn Schott and Jeremy Spillman. Queens of Country described the sound of the self-titled EP to have a mix of acoustic and rock elements in addition to country.

== Release and critical reception ==
Mickey Guyton was released on May 26, 2015, on Capitol Records Nashville. The project was issued to digital download and streaming services following its release. The extended play became her second to chart among the Billboard Top Heatseekers album chart, peaking at number 17 in August 2015. Prior to its release, its lead single was issued on January 12, 2015, "Better Than You Left Me." The single had the highest one-week add total followings its official release. The single was Guyton's first to chart the Billboard Country Airplay chart, peaking at number 34 in July 2015. On the Canadian Country chart, the single reached number 42.

== Track listing ==
Unbreakable
No.	Title	Writer(s)	Length
1.	"Why Baby Why"	Victoria Banks; Phil Barton; Emily Shackleton	4:29
2.	"Somebody Else Will"	Ashley Gorley; Luke Laird; Hillary Lindsey	3:41
3.	"Pretty Little Mustang"	Mickey Guyton; Lindsey; Jeremy Spillman	3:51
4.	"Better Than You Left Me"	Nathan Chapman; Guyton; Jennifer Hanson; Jen Schott	4:03
Total length:			16:04

== Charts ==
Chart (2015)	Peak position
US Heatseekers Albums (Billboard)	17

== Release history ==
Region	Date	Format	Label	Ref.
United States	May 26, 2015	Digital download	Capitol Records Nashville	
