= Better Than You Left Me =

Single by Mickey Guyton

from the EP Mickey Guyton
- Released: January 12, 2015
- Genre: Country
- Length: 4:02
- Label: Capitol Nashville
- Songwriters: Mickey Guyton; Jennifer Hanson; Jenn Schott; Nathan Chapman
- Producers: Nathan Chapman; Dann Huff

Mickey Guyton singles chronology
"Better Than You Left Me" (2015)	"Heartbreak Song" (2016)

"Better Than You Left Me" is the debut single from American country music artist Mickey Guyton. It was released to country radio on January 12, 2015 as the first single from her self-titled second EP (2015) and forthcoming debut studio album for Capitol Nashville. The song was written by Guyton, Jennifer Hanson, Jenn Schott, and Nathan Chapman. A re-recorded version of the song is included on Guyton's 2021 debut album Remember Her Name.

== Content ==
Guyton said that the single was inspired by a breakup with a former boyfriend who "came running back to" her after she got the opportunity to sing for the President of the United States. In the song, the female narrator encounters a former lover, and tells him that she is "better than you left me".

== Critical reception ==
Taste of Country named the song a "Critic's Pick" from editor Billy Dukes, who called Guyton a "pure country vocalist who relies on talent and strong songwriting before anything else". USA Today's Brian Mansfield also reviewed the single favorably, saying that it "has a soaring melody that reflects its strength of spirit."

== Music video ==
Peter Zavadil directed the music video, which premiered January 12, 2015 on CMT.

== Chart performance ==
The song has sold 145,000 copies in the US as of May 2015.

Chart (2015)	Peak position
Canada Country (Billboard)	42
US Country Airplay (Billboard)	34

=== Year-end charts ===
Chart (2015)	Position
US Country Airplay (Billboard)	91
