= Black Like Me (song) =

2020 single by Mickey Guyton

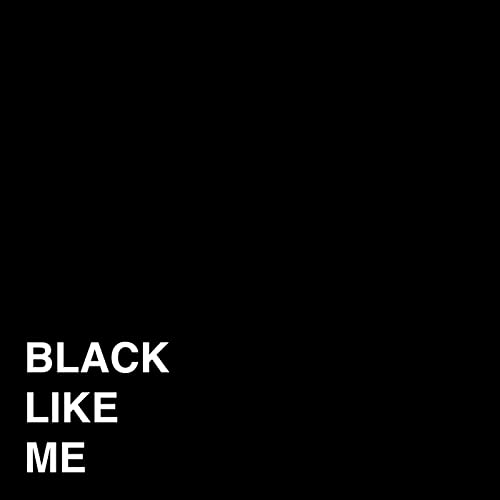

Single by Mickey Guyton

from the album Remember Her Name and the EP Bridges
- Written: 2019
- Released: June 2, 2020
- Genre: Country pop
- Length: 3:30
- Label: Capitol Nashville
- Songwriters: Mickey Guyton; Nathan Chapman; Fraser Churchill; Emma Davidson Dillon
- Producers: Nathan Chapman; Forest Whitehead

Mickey Guyton singles chronology
"What Are You Gonna Tell Her?" (2020)	"Black Like Me" (2020)	"Heaven Down Here" (2020)

"Black Like Me" is a song by American country music artist Mickey Guyton. It was released on June 2, 2020, amidst the George Floyd protests. It was included on her third EP, Bridges, and her debut studio album, Remember Her Name (2021). The title of the song is taken from the 1961 non-fiction book of the same name by John Howard Griffin.

== Content ==
Guyton wrote "Black Like Me" with Fraser Churchill, Emma Davidson Dillon, and Nathan Chapman, the latter of whom also co-produced the song with Forest Whitehead. It is a piano ballad that details Guyton's experiences as a black woman navigating life and a career in country music (she is the only black female artist signed to a major country music label), highlighting racial inequality with the song's chorus ("If you think we live in the land of the free/You should try to be black like me"). The song's title was inspired by Black Like Me, a book exposing racial inequality in the Southern United States in the 1960s written by John Howard Griffin.

Written on a writer's retreat in 2019, it was not released until June 2, 2020, eight days after the murder of George Floyd and amidst widespread protests. It was originally slated to be released as a bundle alongside "What Are You Gonna Tell Her?" earlier in the year, but its release was postponed in part due to the COVID-19 pandemic. Instead, Guyton posted a snippet of the song on social media and Spotify contacted Capitol Nashville requesting the song's full release, which they then put on top of their Hot Country playlist. Guyton said the response to the song left her overwhelmed with messages from others: "There’s tears of joy, tears of sadness. There’s a guilt that I’m feeling. I keep thinking, “I don’t deserve this.” There's also guilt when I see the pain other people are feeling as their eyes open and see the oppression that I’ve experienced, having to see that pain in them as I'm talking about it. It's all so heavy."

== Reception ==
"Black Like Me" received a nomination for Best Country Solo Performance at the 63rd Annual Grammy Awards, making Guyton the first black woman to receive a Grammy nomination in that category. On her nomination, Guyton said it was "a testament to never give up and live your truth. I can't think of a better song to make history with than 'Black Like Me' and I hope that I can continue to help open doors for other women and people who look like me." Guyton also performed "Black Like Me" on the Grammy Awards broadcast on March 14, 2021. Following the performance and a rise in sales, a new version of the song titled "Black Like Me (Our Voices)" was sent to adult contemporary radio stations by Guyton's record label EMI Nashville in partnership with Republic Records.

In 2024, Rolling Stone ranked the song at #154 on its 200 Greatest Country Songs of All Time ranking.

== Track listing ==
Digital download

1. "Black Like Me" – 3:30

Digital download – re-release

1. "Black Like Me (Our Voices)" – 2:58

== Chart performance ==
Chart (2021)	Peak position
US Adult Contemporary (Billboard)	27
US Country Digital Song Sales (Billboard)	4
US Digital Song Sales (Billboard)	32
