= Heartbreak Song =

Single by Mickey Guyton
- Released: June 3, 2016
- Genre: Country pop
- Length: 3:27
- Label: Capitol Nashville
- Songwriters: Mickey Guyton; Mark Trussell; April Geesbreght
- Producer: Mark Trussell

Mickey Guyton singles chronology
"Better Than You Left Me" (2015)	"Heartbreak Song" (2016)	"Nice Things" (2017)

"Heartbreak Song" is a song recorded by American country artist Mickey Guyton. It was released as her second single through Capitol Records Nashville on June 3, 2016. Guyton co-wrote the song with Mark Trussell and April Geesbreght in response to the subject of her previous single, "Better Than You Left Me", bragging about inspiring the hit.

== Content ==
"Heartbreak Song" is a country pop song written by Mickey Guyton, Mark Trussell, and April Geesbreght and produced by Trussell. A "thumping" bass line carries the track, while Guyton delivers "straight-to-the-point", "incisive" lyrics with a "soulful" delivery. The song was inspired by Guyton's ex-boyfriend, who was also the subject of previous single, "Better Than You Left Me", after Guyton learned that the man was "bragging" that she "wrote [the song] about him." Critics have noted thematic similarities with her debut single in contrast to the more upbeat tone and more pop-leaning production.

== Critical reception ==
The staff of Taste of Country noted that the song is less of a "vocal showcase" than her previous single, but that Guyton "continues to prove her worth as a fine storyteller" on the track. The blog also praised the song's radio-friendly sound.

== Chart performance ==
=== Weekly charts ===
Chart (2016)	Peak position
US Country Airplay (Billboard)	45

== Release history ==
Country	Date	Format	Label	Ref.
Worldwide	June 3, 2016	Digital download	Capitol Nashville	
United States	June 20, 2016	Country radio	Capitol Nashville	
