= Mickey Guyton =

American country music singer (born 1983)

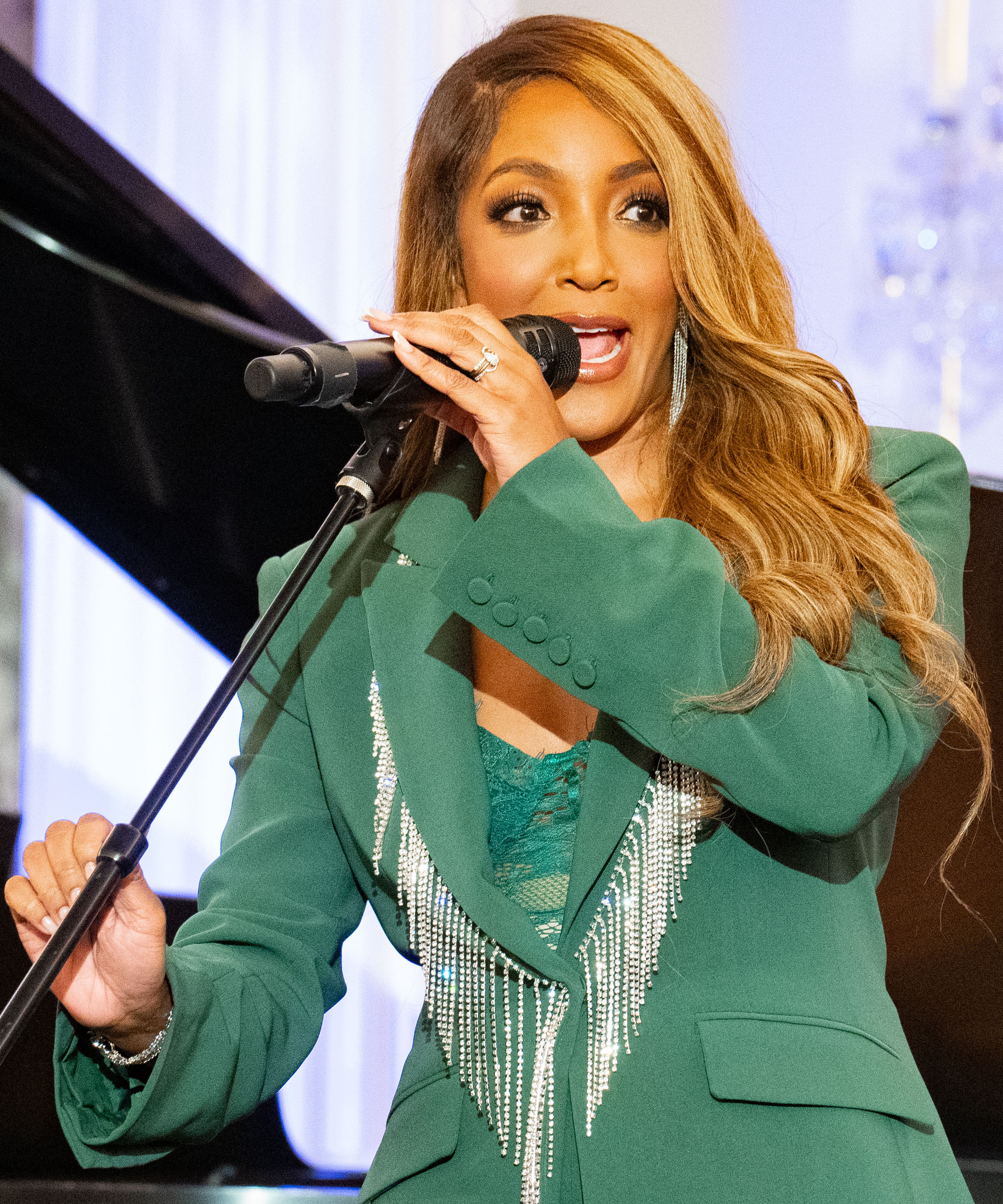
- Guyton performing during the launch of the Global Music Diplomacy Initiative in 2023
- Born: Candace Mycale Guyton; June 17, 1983 (age 43); Arlington, Texas, U.S.
- Occupations: Singer; songwriter
- Years active: 2011–present
- Spouse: Grant Savoy (m. 2017)
- Children: 1
- Musical career
- Genres: Country; R&B; pop
- Instrument: Vocals
- Label: Capitol Nashville
- Website: mickeyguyton.com

Candace Mycale "Mickey" Guyton (/ˈɡaɪtən/; born June 17, 1983) is an American singer and songwriter. Born and raised in Texas, Guyton was exposed to various types of music at a young age, and her material incorporates elements of contemporary country, pop, and R&B music. She moved to Nashville in 2011 and signed a recording contract with Capitol Records Nashville. In 2015, the label released Guyton's debut extended play (EP), Unbreakable.

In 2015, Capitol released her debut single, titled "Better Than You Left Me". The song reached number 34 on the US Country Airplay chart and earned her a nomination from the Academy of Country Music Awards. The same year, her second self-titled EP was released. In 2020, in the wake of the George Floyd protests and the Black Lives Matter movement, Guyton released the single "Black Like Me", which speaks to her experiences as a Black woman in country music. The song helped further elevate Guyton's career and resulted in her first ever nomination at the Grammy Awards, becoming the first Black woman to ever be nominated in the Best Country Solo Performance category. Later that year, her third extended play Bridges was released. She then collaborated with Dean Brody on the song "Boys" which made her the first Black woman to achieve a number one hit on the Canada Country chart. Her debut album Remember Her Name followed in 2021.

She performed the United States national anthem, “The Star-Spangled Banner,” prior to Game 5 of the 2026 NBA Finals between the New York Knicks and the San Antonio Spurs. She did the same before Game 1 of the 2026 World Series between the Tampa Bay Rays and Milwaukee Brewers.

== Early life ==
Guyton was born in Arlington, Texas, the second oldest of four children. Her family moved throughout the state during her childhood, due to her father's job as an engineer. She was initially enrolled in a local public school, but faced racial discrimination from other families in the neighborhood and was subsequently moved to a private school. Despite this change, Guyton continued to experience racism, stating in a 2020 interview with NPR that her best friends' parents would often refer to her with racial slurs.

Guyton also began singing as a child and developed an interest in music around five years old. She often performed in church choirs, notably at Mount Olive Baptist Church in Arlington. She was inspired to begin a singing career after she saw LeAnn Rimes sing "The Star-Spangled Banner" at the start of a Texas Rangers game. She moved to Los Angeles, California after graduating high school to pursue country music professionally while attending Santa Monica College. She studied business and also worked several minimum wage jobs to support herself. Several of the jobs included work as a background vocalist, including an appearance singing in Nick Cannon's film Underclassman. Additionally, she sang on demonstration records and auditioned for the seventh season of American Idol. Guyton's American Idol run ended just before the live shows for the top 24, and she appeared only briefly on television during her final singing performance of the audition rounds.

== Career ==
=== 1998-1999: 3LW ===
Guyton was an original founding member of Y2K girl group 3LW, most notably known for their hits,"No More (Baby I'ma Do Right)" and "Playas Gon Play." Guyton was scouted by record executive Tse Williams for the later platinum selling trio which included Williams' baby sister Kiely Williams, a 14 year old Adrienne Bailon, and post Guyton's departure, a young Naturi Naughton. Guyton was a part of the demo phase of the group and was included in being offered a deal from Sony/Epic, however her parents pulled her from the group before signing. The group would go on to sell 2 million copies of their Self Titled debut album 3LW with Naughton in tow, before she ultimately left the group in 2002. Mickey Guyton confirms she was a member of 3LW

=== 2011–2015: Early career and "Better Than You Left Me" ===
After moving to Los Angeles, Guyton met record producer Julian Raymond. Impressed by her singing voice, he introduced her to country music industry professionals Gary Borman and Steve Moir. Both men helped launch the music careers of country artists such as Faith Hill and Keith Urban. The initial meetings with Borman and Moir prompted her to move to Nashville, Tennessee in 2011. Guyton soon became part of the city's country music songwriting community. The same year, Guyton had the opportunity to audition for UMG Nashville's chairman, Mike Dungan. Singing a song by Patty Loveless, she was then signed to UMG's Capitol Records Nashville division. With her signing, she became the genre's only Black female artist signed to a major label. Among her first events following her label signing was an all-star performance at the White House, where she performed alongside Kris Kristofferson, Lyle Lovett, Darius Rucker and James Taylor.

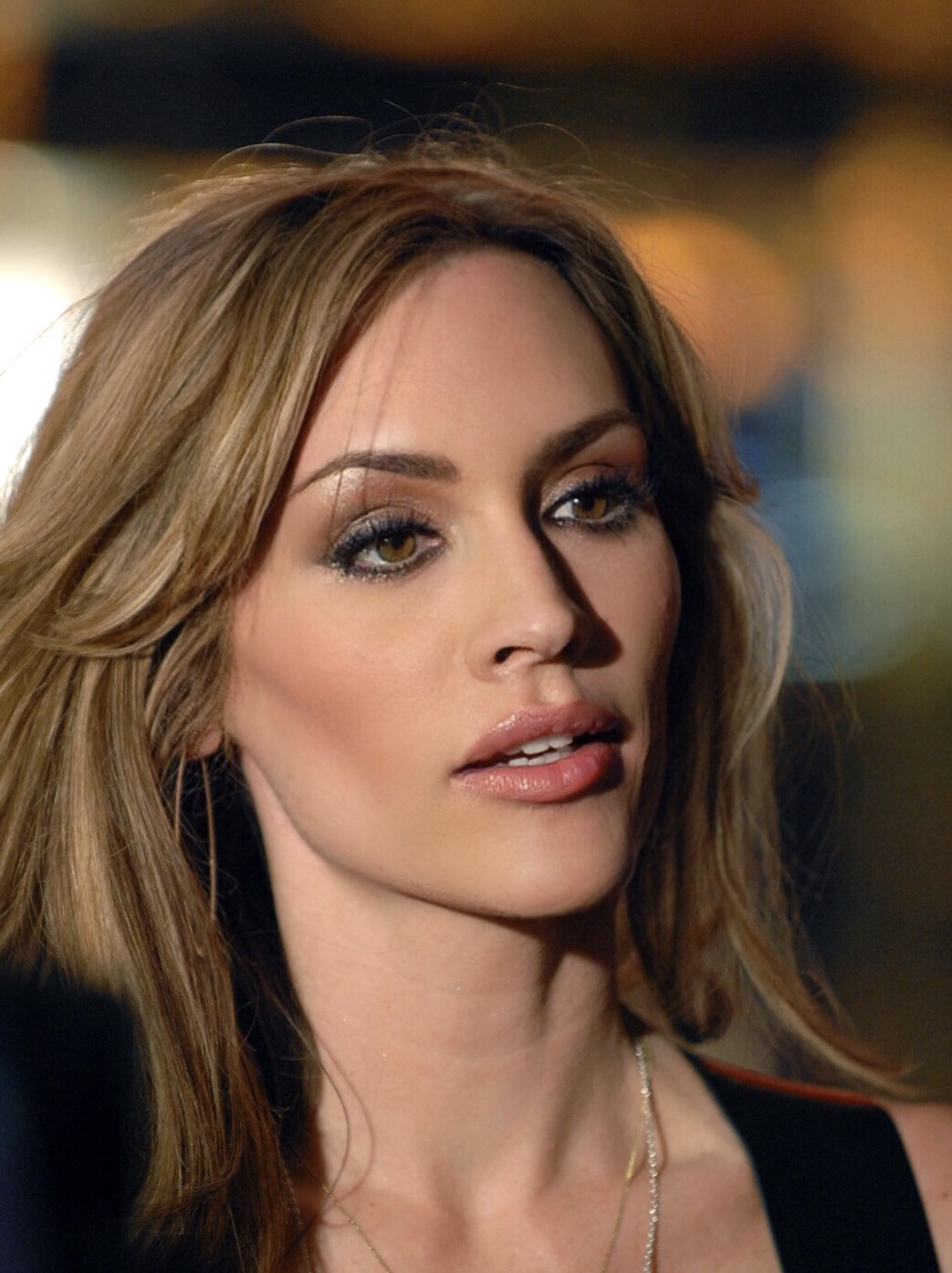
Jennifer Hanson was one of the co-writers of Guyton's debut single "Better Than You Left Me".

As she developed her artistry, Guyton was warned by industry professionals that she would be unsuccessful if she went outside traditional country music boundaries: "Make sure your songs sound really country because listeners might think you're being disingenuous. Don't make your songs sound too R&B," she recalled to CNN. She was asked by a country radio DJ to write songs that reflected "fluffy" and "happy" topics. The stress and anxiety of these instances caused Guyton to develop insomnia and a drinking problem. These conflicts, along with the difficulties of establishing an identity at Capitol Records, caused her music releases to be delayed by several years. In 2014, Capitol Nashville released Guyton's first extended play (EP), an acoustic album titled Unbreakable. The EP charted on the Billboard Top Heatseekers list after its release, reaching number 14.

In 2015, Capitol released Guyton's debut single, "Better Than You Left Me". Guyton co-wrote the song with Jennifer Hanson, Jen Schott, and Nathan Chapman, the last of whom co-produced it with Dann Huff. The song received 79 ads to radio playlists in its first week of release, which had not been previously done. The Guardian made note of the song's early success on the charts, particularly in relation to Guyton's being a Black female in a genre dominated by white men. By July 2015, the song had reached number 34 on the Billboard Country Airplay chart. It reached a similar peak position on Canada's Billboard country chart. According to Guyton, the song's minimal chart success was due to radio programmers stating "they didn't want two slow songs by women on the radio at the same time." In May 2015, Guyton's self-titled second EP was released on Capitol and contained the minor hit. The EP reached number 17 on the Billboard Heatseekers list by August. The project received a four star rating from Queens of Country, who praised Guyton's vocals and mix of different musical stylings. Guyton also joined Brad Paisley's Crushin' It World Tour in summer 2015.

=== 2016–2020: Musical shifts and "Black Like Me" ===
In 2016, Guyton was nominated for New Female Vocalist of the Year at the 51st Academy of Country Music Awards. That year she also released her next single, "Heartbreak Song". The song reached number 45 on the Country Airplay chart. She continued releasing singles on Capitol such as "Hold On", "Sister", and a cover of Patsy Cline's "Crazy". Entertainment writer Emily Yahr described Guyton's 2016–19 releases as having "heavily-produced" arrangements that seemed to lack a musical direction. These singles also had little commercial success. Guyton later told The Washington Post that she was focusing more on what radio wanted rather than going by her own musical instincts. Instead, she began reworking her musical direction.

Guyton chose to write music that reflected more of her struggles as a black woman. In early 2020, she released a single that came from those songwriting sessions titled "What Are You Gonna Tell Her?". It was followed by the single "Black Like Me". Based on the book of the same name, the song described Guyton's experiences with racial discrimination. It was largely ignored by commercial country radio, but received significant attention on social media platforms and streaming services, with Spotify including "Black Like Me" on their "Hot Country Playlist". Critics also took notice of the track. John Blake of CNN called it "a three-and-a-half-minute song that flipped the good ol' boy patriotism of country music on its side and forced listeners to consider a different perspective." Jewly Hight of NPR praised Guyton's blend of country, gospel and pop vocal styles. The song was later nominated for Best Country Solo Performance at the 63rd Annual Grammy Awards. The Grammy nomination made Guyton the first black female artist to be nominated in the country category.

In 2020, Guyton became the first black female artist to perform at the Academy of Country Music awards. Capitol then released her third EP titled Bridges (2020). The project featured her two previous singles and her third 2020 single, "Heaven Down Here". Four of its six tracks were "sobering personal testimonies", according to Taste of Country. Bridges peaked at number 23 on the Billboard Heatseekers album chart in September 2020. In November 2020, she collaborated with Canadian country singer Dean Brody on the duet "Boys". The single reached number one on the Canada Country singles chart, giving Guyton her first career chart-topper, and making her the first black woman to top the Canada Country chart.

=== 2021–2024: Continued performances and House on Fire ===
After becoming the first black female host of the Academy of Country Music Awards in 2021, Guyton revealed to The New Yorker, the release of her debut studio album called Remember Her Name. She described the album as a look into her ten years living in Nashville, with songs directly addressing experiences of sexism and racism. The album was released in September 2020 and included "Black Like Me", a re-recording of "Better Than You Left Me", and a cover of Beyoncé's "If I Were a Boy". Rating it 3.5 out of 5 stars, Stephen Thomas Erlewine of AllMusic wrote, "If the bombast and ballads flatten the production of Remember Her Name somewhat, it nevertheless feels genuine, not calculated. Guyton is broadening and expanding the genre-bending sounds of 1990s country-pop".

In February 2022, Guyton performed the National Anthem at Super Bowl LVI. In 2023, Guyton was a coach and judge on My Kind of Country. In Guyton announced that she was working on new music with Florida Georgia Line's Tyler Hubbard. The first Hubbard-produced single was 2022's "Somethin' Bout You". In 2023, Guyton announced via the social media the release of her next radio single "Nothing Compares to You". The song was composed by Hubbard and featured vocals from Kane Brown. Guyton performed her song "All American" at the 2024 Democratic National Convention on August 19, 2024. Capitol Records released Guyton's second studio album, House on Fire, in September 2024. The album included twelve songs all co-written by Guyton, along with a duet with Kane Brown. Prior to the album's release, she issued the title track and "My Side of the Country" as preview singles.

== Musical styles and influences ==
Guyton's musical style has been described as being rooted in country music, but also in its sub-genres and other musical sectors. In describing her 2020 musical efforts, NPR's Jewly Hight observed a mixture of country, pop, gospel, R&B and hip hop. Mike Collar of Allmusic found that Guyton has "a warm, textured voice, whose sound walks the line between classic country and contemporary pop." Guyton explained that her musical style contains elements of pop, but is mostly rooted in country.

An early influence on Guyton was her musical idol Dolly Parton, whom she got to meet in person in a surprise meeting on CBS This Morning in 2016. "She came up in a time that was extremely conservative but she had such progressive views. She taught people to love for who they are no matter what and I think that's amazing," she told Country Music Television. Guyton was also heavily influenced by LeAnn Rimes and her 1996 album Blue. Rimes' music helped Guyton discover other female country performers, including Patsy Cline, Patty Loveless, Reba McEntire, and Martina McBride. "I was just mesmerized by big-voiced women," she recalled. Guyton also credits BeBe & CeCe Winans and Whitney Houston as musical influences.

== Personal life ==
Guyton began a relationship with lawyer Grant Savoy in 2010. In November 2016, the couple announced their engagement. In June 2017, the couple wed in Kauaʻi, Hawaii alongside 23 friends and family members. In August 2020, Guyton announced that she was pregnant with the couple's first child. In February 2021, she gave birth to a son whom the couple named Grayson.

== Discography ==
- Remember Her Name (2021)
- House on Fire (2024)

== Filmography ==
Film and television appearances by Mickey Guyton
Title	Year	Role	Notes	Ref.
Cardi Tries	2021	Herself		
Mickey Mouse Funhouse	2021–22	Wanda Warbler	Recurring role	
The Ellen DeGeneres Show	2022	Guest host	One episode	
For Love & Country	2022	Herself	Documentary	
CMT Crossroads	2022	Herself/Performer	2 episodes: LeAnn Rimes & Friends, Mickey Guyton & Black Pumas	
Hell's Kitchen	2025	Herself/Guest diner	Episode: "Hell at the Pass"	
Singer 2025	2025	Herself	Chinese singing competition show	

== Awards and nominations ==
Year	Nominee / work	Award	Result	Ref.
2015	51st Annual Academy of Country Music Awards	New Female Vocalist of the Year	Nominated	
2020	63rd Annual Grammy Awards	Best Country Solo Performance – "Black Like Me"	Nominated	
2021	56th Academy of Country Music Awards	New Female Artist of the Year	Nominated	
2021	55th Annual Country Music Association Awards	New Artist of the Year	Nominated	
2022	64th Annual Grammy Awards	Best Country Album – Remember Her Name	Nominated	
2022	64th Annual Grammy Awards	Best Country Song – "Remember Her Name"	Nominated	
2022	64th Annual Grammy Awards	Best Country Solo Performance – "Remember Her Name"	Nominated	
2022	CMT Music Awards	Video of the Year – "Remember Her Name"	Nominated	
2022	CMT Music Awards	Female Video of the Year – "Remember Her Name"	Nominated	
2022	CMT Music Awards	CMT Performance of the Year – "Friendship Train" (with Gladys Knight and Breland)	Nominated	
