= Ashley Monroe discography =

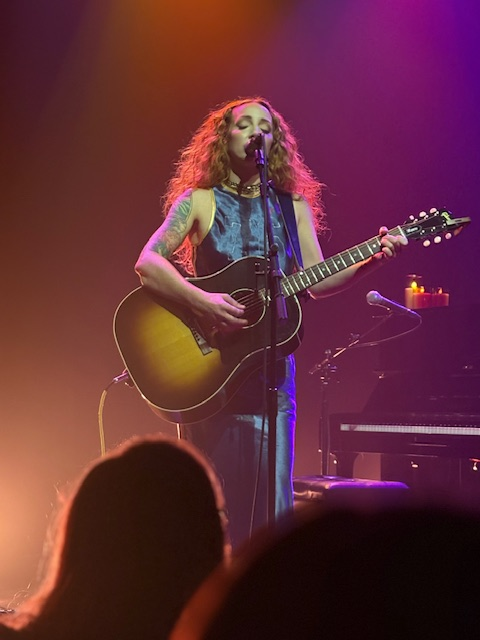
- Ashley Monroe in concert, 2025.
- Studio albums: 6
- EPs: 4
- Live albums: 1
- Singles: 22
- Music videos: 16
- Other appearances: 11

The discography of American country singer–songwriter, Ashley Monroe contains six studio albums, one live album, 16 music videos, four extended plays (EP's) and 22 singles and has made 11 album appearances. Monroe's debut studio album, Satisfied was given an advanced release in 2006 but was officially released in May 2009. It spawned two singles that made the US Hot Country Songs chart in 2006: the title track and a duet with Ronnie Dunn called "I Don't Want To". The latter reached the country songs top 40, rising to the number 37 position.

Monroe self-released two EP's in 2007 and 2009 before the release of her second studio album in March 2013 titled Like a Rose. Issued on Warner Bros. Nashville, the disc was her first to chart, rising to the number ten position on the US Top Country Albums chart and number 43 on the US Billboard 200 chart. Of its three singles, only "Weed Instead of Roses" made the US country chart, peaking at number 39 in 2013. In 2012, Train featured Monroe on their single "Bruises". It reached number 23 on the US country songs chart, number 79 on the US Hot 100, number 16 on the US adult contemporary chart and number 30 in the Netherlands.

In 2014, Monroe was featured on Blake Shelton's single "Lonely Tonight". It rose to the top five of the US country chart and number one of the Country Airplay chart. In July 2015, Monroe's third studio disc The Blade was released by Warner Bros. The album is her highest-peaking to date, peaking at number two on the US country albums chart and number 30 on the US Billboard 200. Its lead single, "On to Something Good", was her first solo effort to make the US Country Airplay chart, climbing to number 53 in 2015. Warner then issued Monroe's fourth studio album in April 2018 titled Sparrow. It reached the number 21 on the US country chart and number 157 on the Billboard 200. Its lead single, "Hands on You", rose into the Hot Country Songs top 50. Monroe's most recent studio album was 2021's Rosegold, issued by Mountainrose Sparrow and Thirty Tigers.

== Albums ==
=== Studio albums ===
List of studio albums, with selected chart positions, showing relevant details
Title	Album details	Peak chart positions			Sales
Title	Album details	US	US Cou.	US Folk	Sales
Satisfied (Note: An advanced version of Satisfied was released in 2006 by Columbia Records before being officially released in 2009.)	Released: May 19, 2009; Label: Sony; Formats: CD, digital	—	—	—	
Like a Rose	Released: March 5, 2013; Label: Warner Bros. Nashville; Formats: CD, LP, digital	43	10	—	
The Blade	Released: July 24, 2015; Label: Warner Bros. Nashville; Formats: CD, LP, digital	30	2	—	US: 38,600
Sparrow	Released: April 20, 2018; Label: Warner Bros. Nashville; Formats: CD, LP, digital	157	21	9	US: 8,000
Rosegold	Released: April 30, 2021; Label: Mountainrose Sparrow/Thirty Tigers; Formats: CD, LP, digital	—	—	—	
Tennessee Lightning	Released: August 8, 2025; Label: Mountainrose Sparrow; Formats: CD, LP, digital	—	—	—	
Dear Nashville	Released: March 27, 2026; Label: Mountainrose Sparrow; Formats: CD, LP, digital	—	—	—	
"—" denotes a recording that did not chart or was not released in that territory.

=== Live albums ===
List of live albums, showing relevant details
Title	Album details
Live at Third Man Records	Released: February 26, 2016; Label: Third Man Records; Formats: LP

== Extended plays ==
List of extended plays, showing relevant details
Title	EP details
Ashley Monroe and Trent Dabbs (with Trent Dabbs)	Released: March 13, 2007; Label: Self-released; Formats: Digital
Ashley Monroe	Released: 2009; Label: Self-released; Formats: CD
Sparrow (Acoustic Sessions)	Released: February 15, 2019; Label: Warner Music Nashville; Formats: Digital
The Covers (with Tyler Cain)	Released: September 1, 2021; Label: Mountainrose Sparrow; Formats: Digital

== Singles ==
=== As lead artist ===
List of singles, with selected chart positions, showing other relevant details
Title	Year	Peak chart positions		Album
Title	Year	US Cou.	US Cou. Air.	Album
"Satisfied"	2006	43		Satisfied
"I Don't Want To" (with Ronnie Dunn)	2006	37		—N/a
"Like a Rose"	2012	—	—	Like a Rose
"Weed Instead of Roses"	2013	39	—	Like a Rose
"Tennessee Christmas"	2014	—	—	—N/a
"On to Something Good"	2015	—	53	The Blade
"Dixie"	2015	—	—	The Blade
"Hands on You"	2018	47	—	Sparrow
"Wild Love"	2019	—	—	Sparrow
"Drive"	2021	—	—	Rosegold
"Til It Breaks"	2021	—	—	Rosegold
"Groove"	2021	—	—	Rosegold
"Easy Going" (with Trent Dabbs)	2021	—	—	—N/a
"Over Everything"	2023	—	—	—N/a
"I Like Trains"	2024	—	—	—N/a
"Risen Road"	2024	—	—	—N/a
"Hot Rod Pipe Dream"	2024	—	—	—N/a
"There You Are"	2024	—	—	—N/a
"—" denotes a recording that did not chart or was not released in that territory.

=== As featured artist ===
List of singles, with selected chart positions, showing other relevant details
Title	Year	Peak chart positions								Certifications	Album
Title	Year	US	US AC	US Cou.	US Cou. Air.	CAN	CAN Cou.	ND	UK	Certifications	Album
"Bruises" (Train featuring Ashley Monroe)	2012	79	16	23	44	59	—	30	169	RIAA: Platinum; MC: Gold	California 37
"Lonely Tonight" (Blake Shelton featuring Ashley Monroe)	2014	47	—	2	1	42	1	—	—	RIAA: Platinum; MC: Gold	Bringing Back the Sunshine
"Is It Ever Really Gone" (Ben Chapman featuring Ashley Monroe)	2023	—	—	—	—	—	—	—	—		Amber Sound, Vol. 1
"Angel" (Butch Walker featuring Ashley Monroe)	2024	—	—	—	—	—	—	—	—		—N/a
"—" denotes a recording that did not chart or was not released in that territory.

== Music videos ==
List of music videos, showing year released and director
Title	Year	Director(s)	Ref.
"Satisfied"	2006	—N/a	
"I Don't Want To" (with Ronnie Dunn)	2006	—N/a	
"Old Enough" (with The Raconteurs and Ricky Skaggs)	2008	Autumn de Wilde	
"Bruises" (Train featuring Ashley Monroe)	2012	Alan Ferguson	
"Like a Rose"	2013	Traci Goudie	
"Weed Instead of Roses"	2013	David McClister	
"Lonely Tonight" (Blake Shelton featuring Ashley Monroe)	2014	Shaun Silva	
"On to Something Good"	2015	Rachel McDonald	
"Bombshell"	2015	—N/a	
"Hands On You"	2018	—N/a	
"Paying Attention"	2018	—N/a	
"Wild Love"	2018	Jaclyn Edmonson	
"Drive"	2021	—N/a	
"Til It Breaks"	2021	—N/a	
"Groove"	2021	—N/a	
"Gold"	2021	—N/a	

== Other appearances ==
List of non-single guest appearances, with other performing artists, showing year released and album name
Title	Year	Other artist(s)	Album	Ref.
"Canary"	2008	—N/a	This Is My America	
"Has Anybody Ever Told You"	2009	—N/a	Ten Out of Tenn: Volume 3	
"What You Gonna Do"	2011	Hunter Hayes	Hunter Hayes	
"Pretty Saro"	2013	Aubrey Haynie	Divided and United: Songs of the Civil War	
"Give It to Me"	2013	Sheryl Crow; Vince Gill	Feels Like Home	
"A Life That's Good"	2014	Nashville Cast	Nashville: On the Record	
"The Storms Are on the Ocean"	2015	—N/a	Orthophonic Joy	
"Jubilee"	2017	The Americans	Music from The American Epic Sessions: Original Motion Picture Soundtrack	
"Like a Rose"	2017	—N/a	Music from The American Epic Sessions: Original Motion Picture Soundtrack	
"I Need You"	2021	The Steel Woods	All of Your Stones	
"Pretend You're Coming Home"	2024	Lauren Watkins	The Heartbroken Record	

== See also ==
- Ten Out of Tenn
- Pistol Annies
