= Wrangled =

Studio album by Angaleena Presley
- Released: April 21, 2017
- Studios: Ronnie's Place Studio, Black River Entertainment, Pioneertown Studiods and The Casino (Nashville, Tennessee); Sac River Building Supply (Stockton, Missouri)
- Genres: Americana, country, outlaw
- Length: 47:10
- Label: Thirty Tigers
- Producers: Angaleena Presley; Oran Thornton

Angaleena Presley chronology
American Middle Class (2014)	Wrangled (2017)

Wrangled is the second solo studio album by outlaw country singer and country music trio Pistol Annies member Angaleena Presley. It was released via Thirty Tigers Records on April 21, 2017.

== Background ==
Wrangled contains several songs with noteworthy collaborations. "Dreams Don't Come True" reunites Presley with her Pistol Annies bandmates Ashley Monroe and Miranda Lambert. Chris Stapleton co-wrote "Only Blood", which features Stapleton's wife Morgane on vocals. Wanda Jackson, known as "Queen of Rockabilly," co-wrote "Good Girl Down" with Presley and Vanessa Olivarez. "Cheer Up Little Darling", a song Presley co-wrote with Guy Clark, was the final song Clark completed before he died on May 17, 2016. As a tribute, Shawn Camp played Clark's mandola and his No. 10 guitar (which was used to write the song). Audio of Clark reciting the first verse is heard in the song before Presley starts singing.

== Critical reception ==
Professional ratings
Aggregate scores
Source	Rating
AnyDecentMusic?	7.4/10
Metacritic	83/100
Review scores
Source	Rating
AllMusic	4.5/5 stars
American Songwriter	4/5 stars
Exclaim!	5/10
The Independent	4/5 stars
The Irish Times	4/5 stars
The Observer	4/5 stars
Paste	8.4/10
Slant Magazine	3.5/5 stars
Uncut	8/10
Vice	A−

Wrangled received acclaim from music critics. At Metacritic, which assigns a normalized rating out of 100 to reviews from mainstream critics, the album has an average score of 83 out of 100 based on 8 reviews, which indicates "universal acclaim". Stephen Thomas Erlewine of AllMusic wrote that Presley "may emphasize her ties to the past but she's intent on expanding the tradition, turning country music into a bolder, more inclusive place, and that desire is what makes Wrangled such a compelling album."

Rolling Stone named Wrangled one of its Top 20 Albums of 2017.

== Commercial performance ==
In the US, Wrangled debuted at No. 15 on Billboard's Heatseekers Albums chart, selling 1,300 copies in its first week. As of May 2017, Wrangled has sold 2,300 copies in the United States.

== Track listing ==
Wrangled
No.	Title	Writer(s)	Length
1.	"Dreams Don't Come True"	Angaleena Presley, Miranda Lambert, Ashley Monroe	4:17
2.	"High School"	Presley, Ivy Walker, Sophie Walker	3:08
3.	"Only Blood" (featuring Morgane Stapleton)	Presley, Chris Stapleton	4:43
4.	"Country" (featuring Yelawolf)	Presley, Michael Wayne Atha	3:34
5.	"Wrangled"	Presley	4:42
6.	"Bless My Heart"	Presley	3:13
7.	"Outlaw"	Presley	4:10
8.	"Mama I Tried"	Presley, Oran Thornton	4:02
9.	"Cheer Up Little Darling"	Presley, Guy Clark	4:40
10.	"Groundswell"	Presley, Ian Fitchuk	3:34
11.	"Good Girl Down"	Presley, Wanda Jackson, Vanessa Olivarez	4:42
12.	"Motel Bible"	Presley, Oran Thornton, Trevor Thornton	2:25
Total length:			47:10

== Personnel ==
Credits adapted from AllMusic.

Vocalists and Musicians

- Angaleena Presley – vocals, backing vocals (4–6, 11), toy piano (6), stomps (12)
- Oran Thornton – acoustic piano (1, 2), Mellotron (1), acoustic guitar (1, 3, 6, 7), electric guitars (2, 5, 6, 8, 11, 12), baritone guitar (3), resonator guitar (4, 10), Hammond B3 organ (5, 8), finger snaps (7), backing vocals (7, 8, 10, 12), xylophone (9), percussion (12), stomps (12)
- Keith Gattis – electric guitars (1–5, 7, 8, 11, 12), acoustic piano (3, 4, 10), baritone guitar (4, 6, 7, 10), Wurlitzer electric piano (5, 9), acoustic guitar (5, 9), guitars (10), mandolin (12)
- Shawn Camp – acoustic guitar (9), mandola (9)
- Russ Pahl – steel guitar (1–7, 10–12), banjo (6, 10)
- Glenn Worf – bass (1, 2, 5, 7, 8), upright bass (3, 6, 9, 11)
- David Jacques – bass (4, 10, 12)
- Craig Wright – drums (1–3, 6–9, 11), percussion (1, 2, 6–8), finger snaps (7)
- Fred Eltringham – drums (4, 10, 12), percussion (10, 12)
- Buckley Miller – castanets (8)
- Justin Francis – stomps (12)
- Garrett Cooper – truck owner and operator (4)
- Miranda Lambert – backing vocals (1)
- Ashley Monroe – backing vocals (1)
- Walker County (Ivy & Sophie Walker) – backing vocals (2)
- Morgane Stapleton – backing vocals (3)
- Yelawolf – rap (4)
- Charlie Pierce – cackling with laugh (4)
- Heather Morgan – backing vocals (7)
- Jack Ingram – backing vocals (9)
- Guy Clark – recitation (9)

Handclaps

- Keith Gattis (2, 4)
- Charlie Pierce (2, 4)
- Angaleena Presley (2, 4, 12)
- Bradley Thornton (2, 4, 8)
- Chandler Thornton (2, 4, 8)
- Layne Thornton (2, 4, 8)
- Oran Thornton (2, 4, 7, 8, 12)
- Glenn Worf (2)
- Craig Wright (2)
- Fred Eltringham (4)
- David Jacques (4)
- Justin Francis (12)

=== Production ===
- Angaleena Presley – producer
- Oran Thornton – producer, mixing
- Buckley Miller – engineer, mixing
- Jordan Powell – recitation recording (9)
- Justin Francis – assistant engineer
- Chris Athens – mastering at Chris Athens Masters (Austin, Texas)
- Keith Brogdon – artwork
- Becky Fluke – photography
- Charlie Pierce – ringleader, handler

== Charts ==
Chart (2017)	Peak position
UK Americana Albums (Official Charts)	8
UK Country Albums (Official Charts)	4
UK Independent Albums (Official Charts)	30
US Heatseekers Albums (Billboard)	15

== Release history ==
Region	Date	Format(s)	Label	Ref.
Worldwide	April 21, 2017	CD; LP; digital download	Thirty Tigers	
