= Weed Instead of Roses =

Single by Ashley Monroe

from the album Like a Rose
- Released: September 2013
- Genre: Country; honky tonk
- Label: Warner
- Songwriter(s): Sally Barris; Jon McElroy; Ashley Monroe
- Producer(s): Vince Gill

Ashley Monroe singles chronology
"Like a Rose" (2012)	"Weed Instead of Roses" (2013)	"Lonely Tonight" (2014)

"Weed Instead of Roses" is a song originally recorded and performed by American country singer–songwriter, Ashley Monroe. Co-written by Monroe, along with Sally Barris and Jon McElroy, the song's concept is centered on a character who wants to add intimacy to their relationship by adding more unconventional sexual items. The song was given positive reviews from music critics and reached the top 40 on the US country chart in 2013. It was also included on Monroe's 2013 album by Warner Records titled Like a Rose.

== Background and recording ==
Ashley Monroe gained notoriety as a member of the all-female country group, the Pistol Annies, and as a solo artist. After the release of an unsuccessful debut studio album, Satisfied (2006), Monroe found work as a songwriter before joining the Pistol Annies in 2011. This reignited Monroe's solo career and Warner issued her 2013 studio album, Like a Rose. Among its singles was "Weed Instead of Roses".

At age 19, Monroe co-wrote the song with Sally Barris and Jon McElroy. Monroe originally heard the phrase "give me weed instead of roses" in her head, resulting in her presenting the phrase to Barris and McElroy. Both of the writers liked Monroe's concept and decided to finish writing the tune. The song was then presented to Monroe's Like a Rose producer, Vince Gill, who said he would not record the album unless the tune was included. "Weed Instead of Roses" is centered on a character who wants to keep intimacy interesting with her partner, suggesting they substitute more conventional gifts with leather attire and cannabis.

== Critical reception ==
"Weed Instead of Roses" was met with positive reception from critics and writers. Billy Dukes of Taste of Country wrote, "'Weed Instead of Roses' is the type of song that exposes hypocrisy. Those who feign outrage may have a few green secrets of their own." In reviewing Like a Rose, Stephen Thomas Erlewine of AllMusic found the song to be an example of Monroe being "devilishly funny" and "modern honky tonk". Ken Tucker of NPR also referenced the song when reviewing Like a Rose, finding it to be an example of Monroe letting go of the "tender sentiments" found on the album with "ambivalent" themes. Marissa R. Moss of Rolling Stone named it one of "Country's 15 Highest Drug Odes", calling it, "Never did getting nasty sound so sweet".

== Release, chart performance and music video ==
"Weed Instead of Roses" was released as a single in October 2013 by Warner Bros. Records. It debuted on the US Billboard Hot Country Songs chart on October 19, 2013. It spent four weeks on the chart, rising to the number 39 position on November 9, becoming Monroe's second top 40 single on the country songs survey. To date, it is Monroe's last top 40 entry on the chart. A music video for "Weed Instead of Roses" premiered in October 2013 that portrayed Monroe on a mid-twentieth century television variety show. Amy Sciaretto of Taste of Country commented that, "You won't be able to divert your gaze from her energy and her wink-wink, nudge-nudge attitude."

== Charts ==
Weekly chart performance for "Weed Instead of Roses"
Chart (2013)	Peak position
US Hot Country Songs (Billboard)	39
