= Lonely Tonight =

Single by Blake Shelton featuring Ashley Monroe

from the album Bringing Back the Sunshine
- Released: November 17, 2014
- Recorded: 2014
- Genre: Country
- Length: 3:38
- Label: Warner Bros. Nashville
- Songwriters: Brent Anderson; Ryan Hurd
- Producer: Scott Hendricks

Blake Shelton singles chronology
"Neon Light" (2014)	"Lonely Tonight" (2014)	"Sangria" (2015)

Ashley Monroe singles chronology
"Weed Instead of Roses" (2013)	"Lonely Tonight" (2014)	"On to Something Good" (2015)

"Lonely Tonight" is a song written by Brent Anderson and Ryan Hurd and recorded by American country music singer Blake Shelton, featuring country singer and Pistol Annies member Ashley Monroe. It was recorded for Shelton's eighth studio album, Bringing Back the Sunshine (2014) and was released to country radio in fall 2014 as the album's second single. The song received a Grammy Award nomination for Best Country Duo/Group Performance.

== Content ==
"Lonely Tonight" is a country song about a bittersweet one night stand, with Shelton and Monroe playing ex-lovers who reconnect for one last night. Billy Dukes of Taste of Country described the ballad as "dark love song", while Carolyn Menyes of Music Times called it "relatable and heartbreaking". Billboard writer Chuck Dauphin compared "Lonely Tonight" to Shelton's earlier work from Pure BS (2007) and Startin' Fires (2008).

== Critical reception ==
Billy Dukes of Taste of Country praised the "swell[ing]" production and traditional styling, while also praising the choice of duet partner. Michael McCall of The Calgary Herald noted that the song "shows off [Blake's] vocal and emotional range."

== Chart performance ==
"Lonely Tonight" debuted at number 38 on the Billboard Country Airplay chart for the week ending November 29, 2014. It peaked at number 1 on that chart, making for Shelton's 14th consecutive number 1 hit on that chart. It is also Monroe's first solo number 1 hit, although she previously had a number 1 as one-third of Pistol Annies when they contributed a guest vocal to Shelton's "Boys 'Round Here" in 2013.

The song was certified Gold by the RIAA on March 19, 2015, and has sold 530,000 copies in the US as of April 2015. "Lonely Tonight" was also certified Gold by Music Canada in March 2015 for sales exceeding 40,000 digital units.

== Music video ==
A teaser video featuring the audio of "Lonely Tonight" was uploaded to Blake Shelton's official YouTube channel on September 30, 2014, along with the other songs off Bringing Back the Sunshine. The official music video for "Lonely Tonight" was directed by Shaun Silva and premiered November 12, 2014.

== Charts and certifications ==
=== Weekly charts ===
Chart (2014–2015)	Peak position
Canada Hot 100 (Billboard)	42
Canada Country (Billboard)	1
US Billboard Hot 100	47
US Country Airplay (Billboard)	1
US Hot Country Songs (Billboard)	2

=== Year-end charts ===
Chart (2015)	Position
US Country Airplay (Billboard)	31
US Hot Country Songs (Billboard)	25

=== Certifications ===
Region	Certification	Certified units/sales
Canada (Music Canada)	Gold	40,000^{*}
United States (RIAA)	Platinum	530,000
^{*} Sales figures based on certification alone.
