= Like a Rose (album) =

Studio album by Ashley Monroe
- Released: March 5, 2013
- Recorded: 2012
- Studios: The House (Nashville, Tennessee)
- Genre: Neotraditional country
- Length: 31:50
- Label: Warner Bros. Nashville
- Producers: Vince Gill; Justin Niebank

Ashley Monroe chronology
Ashley Monroe (2009)	Like a Rose (2013)	The Blade (2015)

Singles from Like a Rose
- 1. "Like a Rose" Released: March 4, 2013; 2. "You Got Me" Released: May 20, 2013; 3. "Weed Instead of Roses" Released: September 2013

Like a Rose is the second studio album from American country music artist Ashley Monroe. The album was released on March 5, 2013, via Warner Bros. Nashville. The title track served as the album's first single and was released to radio a day before the album. "You Got Me" and "Weed Instead of Roses" were also released as singles.

== Content ==
Ashley Monroe co-wrote all nine of the album's tracks. Little Big Town provides harmony vocals on "You Got Me" (which was co-written by band member Karen Fairchild) and "You Ain't Dolly (And You Ain't Porter)" is a duet with Blake Shelton.

The album's title track, which Monroe wrote with Guy Clark and Jon Randall, came about when Monroe used the phrase "But look at me, I came out like a rose" after telling Clark her life story. The song ultimately "[set] an autobiographical tone" for the record. It was released to radio on March 4, 2013, as the album's first single, and a music video directed by Traci Goudie premiered on CMT one day earlier. "You Got Me" was released as the second single from the album on May 20, 2013, and "Weed Instead of Roses" was released as the third single in September 2013. "Weed Instead of Roses" became Monroe's first chart single from the album when it debuted at No. 46 on the Billboard Hot Country Songs chart for the week of October 19, 2013, and reached a peak of No. 39.

== Critical reception ==
Professional ratings
Aggregate scores
Source	Rating
AnyDecentMusic?	7.7/10
Metacritic	89/100
Review scores
Source	Rating
AllMusic	4.5/5 stars
MSN Music (Expert Witness)	A−
Nash Country Weekly	A
Paste	8.3/10
The Philadelphia Inquirer	3.5/4 stars
Rolling Stone	4/5 stars
Slant Magazine	4/5 stars
Spin	9/10
Taste of Country	4/5 stars
USA Today	4/4 stars

Like a Rose has received universal praise from critics for its traditional country sound. On Metacritic, a website which assigns a normalised rating out of 100 from reviews by mainstream critics, it currently holds a rating of 89 out of 100, signifying Universal Acclaim, based on 9 reviews.

Billy Dukes of Taste of Country favorably said that "no one does anguish quite like Ashley Monroe. On her new album, ‘Like a Rose,’ the singer redefines bittersweet for a country music audience that is still very much learning her name." Slant Magazine's Jonathan Keefe praised Monroe's ability at "bringing authentic emotions and experiences into compelling narratives that showcase a real mastery of voice." Roughstock reviewer Dan MacIntosh compared her favorably to other female artists Kacey Musgraves and Miranda Lambert. MacIntosh complimented the duet with Blake Shelton ("You Ain't Dolly [And You Ain't Porter]") for its humor and its blending of traditional and contemporary country. Stephen Thomas Erlewine of AllMusic praised Monroe for bringing traditional country music to the present and blending it with contemporary attitudes. He named "Two Weeks Late," "Weed Instead of Roses," and "Monroe Suede" as the album's standout tracks. MSN Music's Robert Christgau found that Monroe "put this much care into every song even if you're not convinced by the one that connects whipped cream and whips." Bill West of Got Country Online said that "Ashley Monroe is stepping in to shake things up a bit with a double helping of pedal steel and tradition." Jody Rosen of Rolling Stone called the album "riveting, beautifully sung, sharp-witted", and "even better" than "her hard-drawlin' vocals on Hell on Heels" by the Pistol Annies. Rosen summed up the album as "nine songs, 32 minutes [and] no false moves", writing that although the album "comes on traditionalist, with old-fashioned production, countrypolitan ballads and punchline-packed honky-tonkers", it is also "modern" when it "drops references to Fifty Shades of Grey"

Tammy Ragusa of Country Weekly wrote that Monroe "has raised that bar" on this album, which is an "outstanding" release as evidenced by the A-grade, and this is because "the album combines Ashley’s almost ethereal voice with a healthy dose of sawing fiddle, pedal steel and doghouse bass to give the entire project an über-traditional country slant." Ragusa wrote that "if you’ve ever bemoaned the absence of traditional country sounds in an era of pop, rock and even hip-hop production, be still—Ashley Monroe is throwing you a country music lifeline. Whether country radio will embrace it is anybody’s guess. But if they don’t, shame on them." Holly Gleason of Paste wrote that "Like A Rose is no fairy tale.... Less is sometimes more, knowing better than dreaming; on Like A Rose, it’s a powerful reminder of that value beyond perfection, something Ashley Monroe knows by heart." Chuck Eddy of Spin called the album "indelibly catchy." Brian Mansfield of USA Today said that Monroe on this album "turns hilarious and heartbreaking, everyone can hear what the fuss is about." Jon Caramanica of The New York Times gave the album a positive review, writing that "there’s not likely to be a more earthy feeling and backward-sounding country album released on a major label this year". In December 2013, Rolling Stone ranked Like a Rose #18 on its list of the best 50 albums of 2013 and Billboard named it the best country album of the year. The Washington Post named it the 5th best album of the year.

== Commercial performance ==
For the week of March 23, 2013, the album was the number 10 sold Country album in the United States, and it was the number 43 sold album in the United States as a whole on the 200 chart.

== Track listing ==
No.	Title	Writer(s)	Length
1.	"Like a Rose"	Guy Clark, Ashley Monroe, Jon Randall	3:50
2.	"Two Weeks Late"	Shane McAnally, Monroe	3:48
3.	"Used"	Sally Barris, Monroe	3:24
4.	"Weed Instead of Roses"	Barris, Jon McElroy, Monroe	3:19
5.	"You Got Me"	Karen Fairchild, Monroe	3:11
6.	"The Morning After"	Lori McKenna, Monroe, Liz Rose	4:23
7.	"Monroe Suede"	Vince Gill, Monroe	2:33
8.	"She's Driving Me Out of Your Mind"	Monroe, Randall	3:19
9.	"You Ain't Dolly (And You Ain't Porter)" (duet with Blake Shelton)	Gill, Monroe	4:03
Total length:			31:50

== Personnel ==
Compiled from liner notes.

=== Musicians ===
- Ashley Monroe – vocals
- Tony Harrell – accordion (1), acoustic piano (2, 6)
- John Barlow Jarvis – synthesizers (3), acoustic piano (4, 8, 9), Hammond B3 organ (5)
- Richard Bennett – acoustic guitar (1–3, 5, 6, 8, 9), electric guitar (4), archtop guitar (7)
- Steve Gibson – acoustic guitar (1), electric guitar (2–9)
- Vince Gill – acoustic guitar (1–6, 8), electric guitar (7)
- Paul Franklin – steel guitar (1–4, 6–9), dobro (5)
- Dennis Crouch – upright bass
- Michael Rhodes – bass (1, 2, 4, 6, 9)
- Mike Brignardello – bass (3, 5, 7, 8)
- Greg Morrow – drums
- Eric Darken – percussion (3–5, 7)
- Stuart Duncan – fiddle (3, 4, 6–9)

Backing vocalists

- Vince Gill (1, 4, 6, 7)
- Wes Hightower (2, 7)
- Rebecca Lynn Howard (2, 3)
- Richard Marx (3)
- Little Big Town (5)
- Jon Randall (6)
- Andrea Zonn (6)
- Sonya Isaacs (8)
- Carl Jackson (8)
- Blake Shelton – vocals (9)

=== Production ===
- Cris Lacy – A&R direction
- Vince Gill – producer
- Justin Niebank – producer, engineer, mix engineer
- Drew Bollman – assistant engineer, additional recording (3, 8)
- Matt Rausch – assistant engineer, additional recording (5, 6, 8, 9)
- Jim DeMain – mastering at Yes Master (Nashville, Tennessee)
- Jenny Gill – production assistant
- Shane Tarleton – creative director
- Katherine Petillo – art direction, design
- Jim Wright – photography
- Bryin Smoot – hair, make-up
- Tiffany Gifford – wardrobe
- John Grady – management

== Chart performance ==
=== Album ===
Chart (2013)	Peak position
US Billboard 200	43
US Billboard Top Country Albums	10

=== Singles ===
Year	Single	Peak positions
Year	Single	US Country
2013	"Like a Rose"	—
2013	"You Got Me"	—
2013	"Weed Instead of Roses"	39
"—" denotes releases that did not chart
