= Encore (2021 Wanda Jackson album) =

Studio album by Wanda Jackson
- Released: August 20, 2021
- Recorded: 2019
- Genres: Rockabilly; rock and roll; country
- Length: 24:47
- Labels: Big Machine; Blackheart
- Producers: Joan Jett; Kenny Laguna

Wanda Jackson chronology
Unfinished Business (2012)	Encore (2021)

Singles from Encore
- 1. "It Keeps Right On a-Hurtin'" Released: June 25, 2021

Encore is the thirty-second and final studio album by American singer Wanda Jackson. Produced by Joan Jett and Kenny Laguna, the album was released on August 20, 2021 via Big Machine and Blackheart Records. It is Jackson's first album in nine years following 2012's Unfinished Business.

== Background ==
The album was recorded in 2019, prior to Jackson's announcement that she was retiring from performing, following a previously undisclosed stroke which occurred in late 2018.

== Promotion ==
The album's first single "It Keeps Right On a-Hurtin'" was originally a 1962 hit for American country pop singer Johnny Tillotson. "Good Girl Down" which features Angaleena Presley and Candi Carpenter, was written by Jackson and Presley in 2018 and originally appeared on Presley's second studio album Wrangled. The album was released on August 20, 2021 via Big Machine Records and Blackheart Records. She has said it will be her final album.

== Track listing ==
Track listing for Encore
No.	Title	Writer(s)	Length
1.	"Big Baby"	Chris Casello; Robin Lynn Grant	3:02
2.	"Two Shots" (featuring Elle King and Joan Jett)	David Ryan Harris; Elle King	2:50
3.	"You Drive Me Wild"	Joan Jett	3:37
4.	"Good Girl Down" (featuring Angaleena Presley and Candi Carpenter)	Wanda Jackson; Vanessa Olivarez; Angaleena Presley	3:15
5.	"It Keeps Right On a-Hurtin'"	Johnny Tillotson	2:55
6.	"We Gotta Stop"	Jackson; Will Hoge; Olivarez	2:59
7.	"Treat Me Like a Lady" (featuring Joan Jett)	Jackson; Sonia Leigh; Olivarez; Jordan Brianne Simpson	2:35
8.	"That's What Love Is" (featuring Joan Jett)	Jackson; Luke Laird; Lori McKenna; Simpson	3:31
Total length:			24:44
