= Hands On You =

Hands On You may refer to:

- "Hands On You", a song by the Raspberries from the 1974 album Starting Over
- "Hands On You", a song by Juvenile featuring Pleasure P from the 2009 album Cocky & Confident
- "Hands On You", a song by Ashley Monroe from the 2018 album Sparrow
