= American Middle Class (album) =

Studio album by Angaleena Presley
- Released: October 14, 2014
- Studio: Ronnie's Place Studio, Blackbird Studio, Quad Studios and Pioneertown Studios (Nashville, Tennessee)
- Genre: Country, Americana
- Length: 46:48
- Label: Slate Creek Records
- Producer: Jordan Powell; Angaleena Presley

Angaleena Presley chronology
American Middle Class (2014)	Wrangled (2017)

American Middle Class is the debut solo album by Angaleena Presley, released on October 14, 2014, through Slate Creek Records.

== Critical reception ==
Professional ratings
Aggregate scores
Source	Rating
Metacritic	84/100
Review scores
Source	Rating
AllMusic	4/5 stars
Billboard	4/5 stars
Cuepoint (Expert Witness)	A
The Daily Telegraph	5/5 stars
Exclaim!	9/10
The Observer	4/5 stars
PopMatters	8/10
Rolling Stone	3.5/5 stars
Tampa Bay Times	A
Uncut	8/10

American Middle Class received highly positive reviews from music critics. At Metacritic, which assigns a normalized rating out of 100 to reviews from mainstream critics, the album has an average score of 84 out of 100, which indicates "universal acclaim" based on nine reviews.

In a four out of five star review Stephen Thomas Erlewine of AllMusic writes that the album "will linger for some time to come." In the three and a half out of five star review from Rolling Stone's Jonathan Bernstein, he remarks how it is an "impressive solo debut". There was a four star rating granted to the album from Neil Spencer of The Observer, where he revealed he felt "Presley's vocal and lyrical touch are exceptional on an impressive state-of-the-nation album." At The Daily Telegraph, Martin Chilton believes "the musicianship is top notch." The four star review delivered from Billboard's Elias Leight is for "a focused collection of songs." The Uncut magazine rated the album an eight out of ten because "Presley has a wry, modern take on country music." In Cuepoint, Robert Christgau called it a "moderately astonishing bunch of songs" on which "she sings pretty as you please." The eight out of ten rating bestowed on the release from Anthony Easton at PopMatters is in response to "the corruption and failure of the market rotting from the bottom and squeezing from the top, is profoundly realized here." Stuart Henderson rates the album a nine out of ten for Exclaim! because "this debut is about as accomplished as one could reasonably expect." The Tampa Bay Times grants the release an A, and Sean Daly sees how "she has a persistent knack for showmanship, small scenes but grand gestures." Nate Chinen of The New York Times declares "American Middle Class, (Presley's) debut album, comes fully formed, clear about its purpose."

The album was nominated for "International Album of the Year" by the UK Americana Music Association.

== Track listing ==
No.	Title	Writer(s)	Length
1.	"Ain't No Man"	Angaleena Presley	3:44
2.	"All I Ever Wanted"	Presley	5:27
3.	"Grocery Store"	Presley, Lori McKenna	3:42
4.	"American Middle Class"	Presley	3:47
5.	"Dry County Blues"	Presley, Mark D. Sanders	4:01
6.	"Pain Pills"	Presley	2:58
7.	"Life of the Party"	Presley, Matraca Berg	5:24
8.	"Knocked Up"	Presley, Sanders	3:54
9.	"Better Off Red"	Presley	3:38
10.	"Drunk"	Presley, Sarah Siskind	2:57
11.	"Blessing and a Curse"	Presley, Bob DiPiero	3:37
12.	"Surrender"	Presley, Luke Laird, Barry Dean	3:39

== Personnel ==
Credits adapted from AllMusic.

Musicians

- Angaleena Presley – vocals
- John Henry Trinko – keyboards, Wurlitzer electric piano, Hammond B3 organ
- Audley Freed – electric guitars, electric 12-string guitar, dobro, mandolin
- Keith Gattis – acoustic guitars, electric guitars, banjo, bouzouki, dobro, mandolin, harmony vocals (8)
- Josh Grange – steel guitar
- Aden Bubeck – bass guitar, upright bass
- Glenn Worf – bass guitar, upright bass
- Fred Eltringham – drums, castanets, shaker, assorted percussions
- David Henry – cello, violin
- Kelly Archer – harmony vocals (1, 12)
- Gayle Mayes – harmony vocals (2, 11)
- Angela Primm – harmony vocals (2, 11)
- Emily Saliers – harmony vocals (3)
- Patty Loveless – harmony vocals (4)
- Chris Stapleton – harmony vocals (6)
- Sarah Siskind – harmony vocals (10)

Production

- Jordan Powell – producer
- Angaleena Presley – producer
- Charlie Brocco – engineer, mixing
- Taylor Pollert – additional recording
- Kam Luchterhand – assistant engineer, mix assistant
- Brad Henderson – art direction
- Sarah Barlow – photography
- Stephen Schofield – photography
- Tiffany Gifford – stylist
- Lindsay Doyle – hair, make-up

== Chart performance ==
Chart (2014)	Peak position
US Top Country Albums (Billboard)	29
US Heatseekers Albums (Billboard)	14
