= Rosegold (album) =

Studio album by Ashley Monroe
- Released: April 30, 2021
- Genres: Country; pop; hip-hop
- Length: 31:14
- Labels: Mountainrose Sparrow; Thirty Tigers
- Producers: Nathan Chapman; Tyler Cain; Jacob Mitchell; Mikey Reaves; Jordan Reynolds; Ben West

Ashley Monroe chronology
Sparrow (2018)	Rosegold (2021)	Tennessee Lightning (2025)

Rosegold is the fifth solo studio album by American country music singer-songwriter Ashley Monroe, released April 30, 2021, via Mountainrose Sparrow and Thirty Tigers. It follows her 2018 solo release Sparrow, as well as her album Interstate Gospel as part of the country group Pistol Annies from the same year.

== Reception ==
Rosegold ratings
Aggregate scores
Source	Rating
AnyDecentMusic?	5.9/10
Metacritic	70/100
Review scores
Source	Rating
AllMusic	4/5 stars
Paste	7.6/10
Pitchfork	5.7/10
Slant	2.5/5 stars
Under the Radar	5.5/10 stars

According to the review aggregator Metacritic, Rosegold received "generally favorable reviews" based on a weighted average score of 70 out of 100 from 7 critic scores. AllMusic's Stephen Thomas Erlewine wrote, "Sometimes, Rosegold threatens to drift away yet it's never threadbare: It's a singular mood piece, one that suits a spell of twilight reflection." Paste's Ellen Johnson wrote, "It's easy to sink into these 10 songs". Pitchfork's Stephen M. Deusner wrote that Monroe "flattens out the twang and borrows from pop and hip-hop, to mixed results", and that "once you get past the gutsiness of an artist willing to jettison her comfort zone, what you're left with is muddled and unsatisfying."

Under the Radar's Mark Moody wrote that "If more focused, and either working exclusively with [producer Mike] Reaves or someone outside the Nashville inner circle, Rosegold could have had more of a chance to shine as a unified release. As it is, there are a handful of worthwhile singles worth mining, but unlike Monroe's work to date, as a whole the album doesn't coalesce as it could have." Slant's Jim Malec wrote that the album "once again finds the singer-songwriter traversing new ground, but it's an even sharper departure from her previous work", and that "it's an ambitious exercise in style that's ultimately lacking in substance."

== Track listing ==
All tracks are written by Ashley Monroe with others noted.

Rosegold track listing
No.	Title	Writer(s)	Producer	Length
1.	"Siren"	Aaron Raitiere; Mikey Reaves	Reaves	3:32
2.	"Silk"	Raitiere; Jordan Reynolds	Reynolds	3:22
3.	"Gold"	Nathan Chapman	Chapman	3:18
4.	"See"	Raitiere; Jacob Mitchell	Mitchell	2:26
5.	"Drive"	Reaves; Nikko Moon	Reaves	2:48
6.	"Flying"	Nicolle Galyon; Reynolds	Reynolds	2:50
7.	"Groove"	Raitiere; Reaves	Reaves	2:37
8.	"'Til It Breaks"	Ashley Ray; Ben West	West	3:21
9.	"I Mean It"	Chapman	Chapman	3:25
10.	"The New Me"	Brett James	Tyler Cain	3:32
Total length:				31:14

== Personnel ==
- Ashley Monroe – vocals, backing vocals, musician
- Mikey Reaves – musician
- Jordan Reynolds – musician
- Nathan Chapman – musician
- Jake Mitchell – musician
- Niko Moon – musician, additional backing vocals (5)
- Ben West – musician
- Tyler Cain – musician
- Elliott Blaufuss – musician
- Brian Allen – musician
- Chris Powell – musician
- Zach Casebolt – musician
- Gena Johnson – additional backing vocals (10)

=== Production ===
- Ashley Monroe – co-producer
- Gena Johnson – engineer, mixing
- Brian David Willis – digital editing
- Pete Lyman – mastering at Infrasonic Sound (Nashville, Tennessee)
- Fetzer Design – art direction
- Alexa King – photography
- Janice Kinigopolous – hair, make-up

== Charts ==
Chart performance for Rosegold
Chart (2021)	Peak position
US Top Current Album Sales (Billboard)	73
