= Pride: A Tribute to Charley Pride =

Studio album by Neal McCoy
- Released: September 24, 2013
- Genre: Country
- Length: 37:19
- Label: Slate Creek Records
- Producer: Garth Fundis

Neal McCoy chronology
XII (2012)	Pride: A Tribute to Charley Pride (2013)	You Don't Know Me (2016)

Professional ratings
Review scores
Source	Rating
AllMusic	3.5/5 stars

Pride: A Tribute to Charley Pride is the eleventh studio album by American country music singer Neal McCoy. It was released on September 24, 2013. The album is a tribute to Charley Pride, featuring covers of Pride's songs. Darius Rucker, Raul Malo, and Trace Adkins are featured performers.

== Track listing ==
1. "Is Anybody Goin' to San Antone" (Dave Kirby, Glenn Martin) - 3:30
2. "I'm Just Me" (Martin) - 2:57
  - featuring Raul Malo
3. "Kiss an Angel Good Mornin'" (Ben Peters) - 3:06
  - featuring Darius Rucker
4. "Kaw-Liga" (Hank Williams, Fred Rose) - 3:54
5. "You're So Good When You're Bad" (Peters) - 3:35
6. "It's Gonna Take a Little Bit Longer" (Peters) - 2:47
7. "Roll On Mississippi" (Kye Fleming, Dennis Morgan) - 3:52
  - featuring Trace Adkins
8. "Just Between You And Me" (Jack Clement) - 3:07
9. "Mountain of Love" (Harold Dorman) - 3:15
10. "Someone Loves You Honey" (Don Devaney) - 3:03
11. "You're My Jamaica" (Kent Robbins) - 4:13

== Personnel ==
- Trace Adkins - vocals on "Roll On Mississippi"
- David Angell - violin
- Robert Bailey Jr. - background vocals
- J.T. Corenflos - electric guitar
- Dennis Crouch - upright bass
- Eric Darken - percussion
- David Davidson - violin
- Mark Douthit - baritone saxophone, tenor saxophone
- Jenee Fleenor - fiddle
- Paul Franklin - dobro, steel guitar
- Garth Fundis - horn arrangements, background vocals
- Barry Green - trombone
- Vicki Hampton - background vocals
- Wes Hightower - background vocals
- Anthony LaMarchina - cello
- Chris Leuzinger - electric slide guitar
- B. James Lowry - acoustic guitar
- Raul Malo - vocals on "I'm Just Me"
- Neal McCoy - lead vocals
- Greg Morrow - drums, percussion
- Russ Pahl - electric guitar, steel guitar, mandolin
- Steve Patrick - trumpet
- Becky Priest - background vocals
- Mickey Raphael - harmonica
- Mike Rojas - keyboards
- Darius Rucker - vocals on "Kiss An Angel Good Mornin'"
- Pamela Sixfon - violin
- Jimmie Lee Sloas - bass guitar
- Jeff Taylor - accordion
- Mary Katherine Van Osdale - violin
- Kris Wilkinson - viola, string arrangements

== Chart performance ==
Chart (2013)	Peak position
US Top Country Albums (Billboard)	45
