= Slate Creek Records =

American independent record label

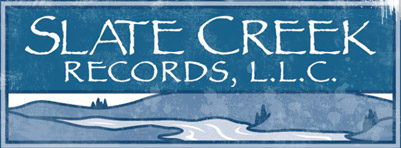
- Founded: 2012
- Founder: Jim Burnett
- Genre: Country
- Country of origin: U.S.
- Location: Frisco, Texas
- Official website: slatecreekrecords.com

Slate Creek Records is an American independent record label based in Frisco, Texas founded in 2012 by Jim Burnett. The label's president is longtime Nashville producer Garth Fundis, who has worked with many artists including Don Williams, Trisha Yearwood, Keith Whitley and Sugarland. The first release on the label was "Pride" by Neal McCoy. Pride: A Tribute to Charley Pride was a tribute album to artist Charley Pride which featured guest performances by Darius Rucker and Trace Adkins.

October 2013 saw the debut album release of Nashville songwriter Brandy Clark. Clark wrote or co-wrote all 12 of the songs and it features Vince Gill on background vocals. Prior to releasing 12 Stories, Clark had written/cowritten several hits for other artists including "Mama's Broken Heart" for Miranda Lambert,"Better Dig Two" for The Band Perry and "Follow Your Arrow" for Kacey Musgraves. In May 2014 Slate Creek announced the signing of Pistol Annies member, Angaleena Presley to the label. Her debut album is set to be released in October 2014. One month later, Canadian group, The Bros. Landreth announced that their debut album would be released on Slate Creek on January 27, 2015.

On February 6, 2017, it was announced that a tribute album honoring Don Williams would be released on May 26, 2017. The 11-track album includes performers and songwriters such as Pistol Annies, Garth Brooks, Chris Stapleton, Jason Isbell, Dierks Bentley, Keb' Mo', Alison Krauss, Lady Antebellum, Brandy Clark, Trisha Yearwood and John Prine.

== Artists ==
=== Former artists ===
- Brandy Clark
- Neal McCoy
- The Bros. Landreth
- Angaleena Presley

=== Studio albums ===
- 2013: Neal McCoy- Pride: A Tribute to Charley Pride
- 2013: Brandy Clark-12 Stories
- 2014: Angaleena Presley- American Middle Class
- 2014: Neal McCoy- Pride: A Tribute to Charley Pride-Deluxe Edition (Cracker Barrel)
- 2015: The Bros Landreth- Let it Lie
- 2017: Gentle Giants- The songs of Don Williams

== Awards and nominations ==
Year	Association	Category	Result
2014	CMA Awards	Best New Artist: Brandy Clark	Nominated
2015	Grammy Awards	New Artist of the Year: Brandy Clark	Nominated
2015	Grammy Awards	Best Country Album: 12 Stories	Nominated
2015	Juno Awards	Roots and Traditional Album of the Year: The Bros. Landreth- Let it Lie	Won

== See also ==
- List of record labels
- 2012 in music
