= Angaleena Presley =

American country music singer-songwriter (born 1976)

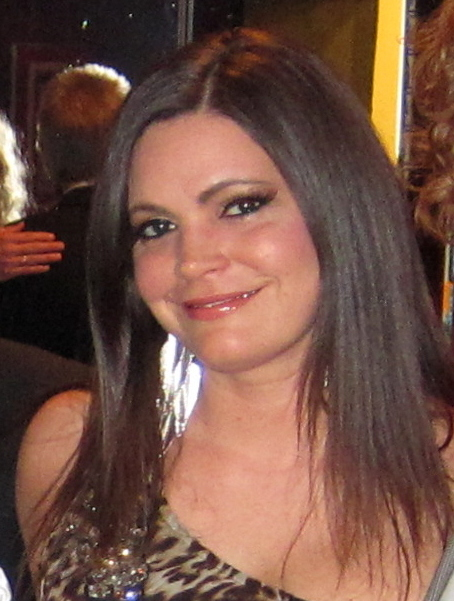
- Presley in 2011

Background information
- Born: Angaleena Loletta McCoy Presley; September 1, 1976 (age 50); Beauty, Kentucky, U.S.
- Origin: Martin County, Kentucky, U.S.
- Genre: Country
- Occupations: Singer, songwriter
- Instruments: Vocals, guitar
- Years active: 2011–present
- Labels: Columbia Nashville, RCA Records Nashville, Slate Creek Records
- Member of: Pistol Annies
- Website: www.pistolannies.com

Angaleena Loletta McCoy Presley (born September 1, 1976) is an American country music singer-songwriter. She is a member of the country trio Pistol Annies, which was formed in 2011 with Miranda Lambert and Ashley Monroe, and has released two solo albums, American Middle Class (2014) and Wrangled (2017).

== Early life ==
Angaleena Presley was raised in Beauty, Kentucky. Her father Jimmy Presley Sr., is a retired coal miner and her mother, Cathy Presley (née McCoy), is a retired school teacher. At age 15, her father taught her how to play her first song on his guitar, "Mama Tried" by Merle Haggard. She attended Sheldon Clark High School in Inez, Kentucky, and graduated in 1994 before attending college at Eastern Kentucky University. On May 22, 2012, she married manager/producer Jordan Powell in a small ceremony in Jackson Hole, Wyoming.

== Career ==
Angaleena faced financial challenges after she left Beauty, at one point "living in the ghetto." In 2000, Presley moved to Nashville, Tennessee, where she landed a publishing deal nine months later. Presley started work as a songwriter in Nashville in 2002. Presley co-founded Pistol Annies with Ashley Monroe and Miranda Lambert. Their debut album Hell on Heels, released on August 23, 2011.

The group spent much of the next two years touring North America and writing songs for their follow-up album. On May 7, 2013, Pistol Annies released their second album Annie Up. On June 17, 2013, the RIAA announced that the album and single for Hell on Heels had both sold in excess of 500,000 copies, giving Pistol Annies their first Gold Record.

In 2014 Presley released her solo album American Middle Class, co-produced with her husband Jordan Powell.

In 2017, Presley released her second solo album, Wrangled.

== Personal life ==
When Pistol Annies first formed, Presley was going through a divorce. In a Rolling Stone interview, she recalled getting a phone call in 2009 from friend Ashley Monroe and Miranda Lambert at 2 am. "They had been listening to my record – and probably drinking a lot – and asked me if I wanted to start a band with them. I almost hung up ’cause I thought it was a prank call, but I went ahead and told them ‘yes,’ and I'm glad I did."

She insists her upbringing was not "the stark, poverty-stricken one as committed to record on the 'Coal Miner's Daughter' by Loretta Lynn. However, the Presley family struggled, and Angeleena continued to faced financial challenges after she left Beauty."

Presley has a son, Jed, born in 2007.

On August 15, 2018, Presley confirmed she was pregnant with her second child (her first with Powell) and gave birth to their daughter Joeleena in January 2019. Presley and Powell divorced in 2022.

== Discography ==
=== Studio albums ===
Title	Details	Peak chart positions		Sales
Title	Details	US Country	US Heat	Sales
American Middle Class	Release date: October 14, 2014; Label: Slate Creek Records	29	14	
Wrangled	Release date: April 21, 2017; Label: Thirty Tigers Records	—	15	US: 2,300
"—" denotes releases that did not chart

=== Music videos ===
Year	Video	Director
2014	"Pain Pills"	Traci Goudie

== Songwriting discography ==
Year	Artist	Album	Song	Co-written with
2021	Wanda Jackson	Encore	"Good Girl Down"	Wanda Jackson, Vanessa Olivarez, Jordan Breane Simpson
2017	Sunny Sweeney	Provoked	"You Don't Know Your Husband"	Mark D. Sanders, Sunny Sweeney
2017	Angaleena Presley	Wrangled		
2017	Angaleena Presley	Wrangled	"Dreams Don't Come True"	Miranda Lambert, Ashley Monroe
2017	Angaleena Presley	Wrangled	"High School"	Ivy Walker, Sophie Walker
2017	Angaleena Presley	Wrangled	"Only Blood"	Chris Stapleton
2017	Angaleena Presley	Wrangled	"Country"	Michael Wayne Atha
2017	Angaleena Presley	Wrangled	"Wrangled"	
2017	Angaleena Presley	Wrangled	"Bless My Heart"	
2017	Angaleena Presley	Wrangled	"Outlaw"	
2017	Angaleena Presley	Wrangled	"Mama I Tried"	Oran Thornton
2017	Angaleena Presley	Wrangled	"Cheer Up Little Darling"	Guy Clark
2017	Angaleena Presley	Wrangled	"Groundswell"	Ian Fitchuk
2017	Angaleena Presley	Wrangled	"Good Girl Down"	Wanda Jackson, Vanessa Olivarez
2017	Angaleena Presley	Wrangled	"Motel Bible"	Oran Thornton, Trevor Thornton
2014	Angaleena Presley	American Middle Class		
2014	Angaleena Presley	American Middle Class	"Ain't No Man"	
2014	Angaleena Presley	American Middle Class	"All I Ever Wanted"	
2014	Angaleena Presley	American Middle Class	"Grocery Store"	Lori McKenna
2014	Angaleena Presley	American Middle Class	"American Middle Class"	
2014	Angaleena Presley	American Middle Class	"Dry County Blues"	Mark D. Sanders
2014	Angaleena Presley	American Middle Class	"Pain Pills"	
2014	Angaleena Presley	American Middle Class	"Life of the Party"	Matraca Berg
2014	Angaleena Presley	American Middle Class	"Knocked Up"	Sanders
2014	Angaleena Presley	American Middle Class	"Better Off Red"	
2014	Angaleena Presley	American Middle Class	"Drunk"	Sarah Siskind
2014	Angaleena Presley	American Middle Class	"Blessing and a Curse"	Bob DiPiero
2014	Angaleena Presley	American Middle Class	"Surrender"	Luke Laird, Barry Dean
2013	Pistol Annies	Annie Up	"I Feel A Sin Comin' On"	Miranda Lambert, Ashley Monroe
2013	Pistol Annies	Annie Up	"Hush Hush"	Lambert, Monroe
2013	Pistol Annies	Annie Up	"Being Pretty Ain't Pretty"	Lambert, Monroe
2013	Pistol Annies	Annie Up	"Unhappily Married"	Lambert, Monroe
2013	Pistol Annies	Annie Up	"Loved by a Workin' Man"	
2013	Pistol Annies	Annie Up	"Blues, You're a Buzzkill"	Lambert, Monroe
2013	Pistol Annies	Annie Up	"Don't Talk About Him, Tina"	Lambert
2013	Pistol Annies	Annie Up	"Trading One Heartbreak for Another"	Monroe
2013	Pistol Annies	Annie Up	"Damn Thing"	Lambert, Monroe
2013	Pistol Annies	Annie Up	"Girls Like Us"	Lambert, Monroe
2013	Pistol Annies	Annie Up	"I Hope You're the End of My Story"	Lambert, Monroe
2011	Pistol Annies	Hell on Heels	"Hell On Heels"	Miranda Lambert, Ashley Monroe, Angaleena Presley
2011	Pistol Annies	Hell on Heels	"Lemon Drop"	Kirsty Lee Akers
2011	Pistol Annies	Hell on Heels	"Housewife's Prayer"	Lambert, Monroe
2011	Pistol Annies	Hell on Heels	"Bad Example"	Lambert, Monroe
2011	Pistol Annies	Hell on Heels	"Takin' Pills"	Lambert, Monroe
2011	Pistol Annies	Hell on Heels	"The Hunter's Wife"	Angaleena Presley
2011	Pistol Annies	Hell on Heels	"Family Feud"	Lambert, Monroe, Presley, Blake Shelton
2011	Miranda Lambert	Four the Record	"Fastest Girl in Town"	Miranda Lambert
2011	Ashton Shepherd	Where Country Grows	"Look It Up"	Robert Ellis Orrall
2008	Heidi Newfield	What Am I Waiting For	"Knocked Up"	Mark D. Sanders

== Awards and nominations ==
Year	Association	Category	Nominated work	Result
2011	American Country Awards	New Artist of the Year	Pistol Annies	Nominated
2012	CMT Awards	Breakthrough Video of the Year	Hell on Heels	Nominated
2012	CMT Awards	Group Video of the Year	Hell on Heels	Nominated
2013	CMT Awards	Group Video of the Year	Takin' Pills	Nominated
2016	UK Americana Awards	International Song of the Year	American Middle Class	Nominated
2018	UK Americana Awards	International Artist of the Year	Artist	Nominated
2020	Grammy Awards	Best Country Album	Interstate Gospel (with Pistol Annies)	Nominated
