= Jordan Powell =

American music manager and record producer

Jordan Powell and Jason Alexander backstage at the 43rd Academy of Country Music Awards on May 18th, 2008.

Phillip Jordan Powell is a Nashville-based music manager and record producer.

== Personal life ==
Powell was born in Dallas, TX and attended Texas A&M University in College Station, TX where he was awarded a B.A. in English. He moved to Nashville in 2006. On May 22, 2012, he married singer-songwriter and Pistol Annies member Angaleena Presley, for whom he had served as tour manager, in a small ceremony in Jackson Hole, WY. On January 22, 2019, Powell and Presley welcomed their first child together, a daughter named Phoenix Joeleena Jean Powell. Presley also has a son named Jed, born in 2006, from a previous relationship.

== Management ==
Powell began his career as a tour manager while still in college at Texas A&M. While living in Texas, he worked for several artists including Roger Creager, Chris Wall, Phil Pritchett and Jack Ingram. In 2005, he began tour managing RCA recording artist and country star Miranda Lambert. Powell remained with Lambert until his departure in late 2012, upon which time he acted as personal manager for clients such as Will Hoge, Jamie Lynn Spears and Angaleena Presley. Since that time, he has also served as tour manager for a variety of acts such as Jewel, Jennifer Nettles, Tony Joe White, and Ben Rector.

== Record production ==
While tour managing, Powell also began producing demo sessions in Nashville for then relatively unknown artists like Adam Hood, Charlie Worsham and Chelsea Lankes. After meeting Nashville recording artist Will Hoge, Powell produced a session which included the song “Another Song Nobody Will Hear” written by Hoge and Dylan Altman. The song was released by Hoge in January, 2013 as a duet with Texas mainstay Wade Bowen. It reached #1 on the Texas Regional Radio Report.

Powell co-produced Angaleena Presley’s 2014 solo debut album “American Middle Class” which The Telegraph gave “five stars" and Billboard said in a glowing review "Presley -- and her husband, Jordan Powell, who served as producer -- fill the album with acoustic playing, light percussion and pretty male-female harmonies. There's not much to suggest this music was made in the past 30 years.” It includes guest appearances by Patty Loveless, Chris Stapleton and Emily Saliers of The Indigo Girls and featured a number of Nashville “A-list” players such as Glenn Worf, Audley Freed and Keith Gattis. The record reached #29 on Billboard's US Top Country Albums chart and #14 on Billboard's US Top Heatseekers Albums.
