= Annie Up =

Studio album by Pistol Annies
- Released: May 7, 2013
- Studios: Ronnie's Place, Sound Stage Studios, Ben's Studio and Jane's Place (Nashville, Tennessee)
- Genre: Country
- Length: 42:35
- Label: RCA Nashville
- Producers: Frank Liddell, Chuck Ainlay, Glenn Worf

Pistol Annies chronology
Hell on Heels (2011)	Annie Up (2013)	Interstate Gospel (2018)

Singles from Annie Up
- 1. "Hush Hush" Released: April 8, 2013

Annie Up is the second studio album by American country girl group Pistol Annies, but this is the first album with RCA Nashville. The group consists of Miranda Lambert, Ashley Monroe and Angaleena Presley. Annie Up started with 83,000 albums sold in the first week.

The vinyl LP version of the record was pressed by United Record Pressing in Nashville, TN.

== Critical reception ==
Professional ratings
Aggregate scores
Source	Rating
AnyDecentMusic?	7.5/10
Metacritic	87/100
Review scores
Source	Rating
AllMusic	4.5/5 stars
Entertainment Weekly	A−
The Guardian	4/5 stars
Los Angeles Times	3.5/4 stars
MSN Music (Expert Witness)	A−
Nash Country Weekly	A−
PopMatters	8/10
Rolling Stone	3.5/5 stars
Spin	7/10
USA Today	3.5/4 stars

Annie Up has received almost universally positive reviews and ratings from music critics. At Metacritic, which assigns a weighted average score out of 100 to reviews and ratings from mainstream critics, the album received a score of 87, based on 11 reviews. Stephen Thomas Erlewine of AllMusic called it a "thoroughly integrated effort; the work of a group, not three individuals" that has a "bruised, beautiful richness." At MSN Music's Expert Witness blog, Robert Christgau highlighted how "a lark evolves into a business proposition as an album of 10 inspired three-minute songs eventuates in an album of 12 expert three-and-a-half-minute songs." At Nash Country Weekly, Jon Freeman found that this album even more so than its predecessor has "more engaging studies of real-life heartbreak, domestic inertia and the daily trials of womanhood."

Kyle Anderson of Entertainment Weekly alluded to that the release "is a more fully formed take on Southern sisterhood." At Los Angeles Times, Randy Lewis evoked that "their switchblade-sharp vision incorporates acute observational powers about the human condition and savvy compositional skills that come together in songs that are piercingly honest, funny and sometimes both." In addition, Lewis said that "mostly it feels like eavesdropping on one helluva lively girls night out." Rob Burkhardt of Music Is My Oxygen Weekly told that the release "doesn’t take this popularity for granted; instead, it wisely spends the political capital", and that is because it "has enough sex appeal to keep the men interested, a deeper look reveals that it is really an album by women, for women." At Rolling Stone, Jody Rosen affirmed that like the predecessor the work is "full of attitude and guffaws, delivered in three-part harmony over down-home country", and found that the trio "drop the 'tude altogether for a love song as poignant as the rest is fun." Roughstock's Matt Bjorke wrote that the effort "is the work of a band and is clearly no side project for any of the band's members."

At The Salt Lake Tribune, David Burger called it a "bluegrass-inspired collection is nothing short of entertaining, even when the women complain non-stop about the men in their lives." Annie Galvin of Slant Magazine highlighted that "Annie Up doesn't quite break the country genre's familiar format, it's a hell of a lot of fun, and one could do worse than spend 40 minutes with these sassy almost-outlaws." Taste of Country's Billy Dukes stated that Pistol Annies "make strides with the arrangements and production on 'Annie Up,' but the stories aren't as sharp and the messages aren't nearly as emotional." At USA Today, Elysa Gardner found that "the clichés are far less striking than the trio's gritty-sweet harmonies, taut musicianship and genuine pluck."

== Track listing ==
All tracks are written by Miranda Lambert, Ashley Monroe and Angaleena Presley, except where noted.

No.	Title	Writer(s)	Lead vocals	Length
1.	"I Feel a Sin Comin' On"		Lambert, Monroe, Presley	3:18
2.	"Hush Hush"		Lambert, Monroe, Presley	3:25
3.	"Being Pretty Ain't Pretty"		Presley	3:34
4.	"Unhappily Married"		Lambert, Monroe, Presley	3:07
5.	"Loved by a Workin' Man"	Presley	Presley	3:48
6.	"Blues, You're a Buzzkill"		Monroe	4:52
7.	"Don't Talk About Him, Tina"	Lambert, Presley	Lambert	3:31
8.	"Trading One Heartbreak for Another"	Monroe, Presley	Presley	3:58
9.	"Dear Sobriety"	Lambert, Monroe	Monroe	4:10
10.	"Damn Thing"		Lambert	2:29
11.	"Girls Like Us"		Lambert, Monroe, Presley	3:51
12.	"I Hope You're the End of My Story"		Monroe	2:32
Total length:				42:35

== Personnel ==
Pistol Annies

- Miranda Lambert – lead vocals, backing vocals
- Ashley Monroe – lead vocals, backing vocals
- Angaleena Presley – lead vocals, backing vocals

Musicians

- Bobby Wood – acoustic piano, Hammond B3 organ
- Glenn Worf – Wurlitzer electric piano, bass guitar, upright bass, slide bass
- Randy Scruggs – acoustic guitars, electric guitars, acoustic slide guitar, banjo, mandolin
- Guthrie Trapp – electric guitars, National guitar, mandolin
- Steve Fishell – steel guitar, lap steel guitar
- Fred Eltringham – drums, percussion, finger snaps
- Eric Darken – percussion

=== Production ===
- Frank Liddell – producer
- Glenn Worf – producer
- Chuck Ainlay – producer, recording, mixing
- Leslie Richter – recording assistant, mix assistant
- Brandon Schexnayder – recording assistant, mix assistant, additional engineer
- Bob Ludwig – mastering at Gateway Mastering (Portland, Maine)
- Brittany Hamlin – production coordinator
- Randee St. Nicholas – photography
- Ryan Supple – photo shoot producer
- Tiffany Gifford – stylist
- Philip Carreon – hair
- Karolina Kangas – make-up
- Myah Morales – make-up
- Naja – nails
- ShopKeeper Management – management

== Chart performance ==
=== Album ===
Chart (2013)	Peak position
Canadian Albums (Billboard)	11
Scottish Albums (Official Charts)	92
UK Country Albums (Official Charts)	2
US Billboard 200	5
US Top Country Albums (Billboard)	2

Sales 221,145 (US Only)

=== Year-end charts ===
Chart (2013)	Position
US Billboard 200	120

=== Singles ===
Year	Single	Peak chart positions	
Year	Single	US Country	US Country Airplay
2013	"Hush Hush"	41	43
