= Interstate Gospel =

Studio album by Pistol Annies
- Released: November 2, 2018
- Studios: Southern Ground and The Casino (Nashville, Tennessee); Muscadine Recording Studios (Macon, Georgia)
- Genres: Americana; country
- Length: 46:41
- Label: RCA Nashville
- Producers: Frank Liddell; Eric Masse; Glenn Worf

Pistol Annies chronology
Annie Up (2013)	Interstate Gospel (2018)	Hell of a Holiday (2021)

Singles from Interstate Gospel
- 1. "Got My Name Changed Back" Released: October 29, 2018

Interstate Gospel is the third studio album by American country supergroup Pistol Annies, and their second with RCA Nashville. It was released on November 2, 2018. It is their first album since 2013's Annie Up. It was nominated for Best Country Album at the 62nd Grammy Awards. It is their very first Grammy nomination. In 2019, Rolling Stone named Interstate Gospel as one of their top ten albums of the decade, ranking it at 9.

== Background ==
Announced on September 27, 2018, the Pistol Annies released three tracks, "Interstate Gospel", "Got My Name Changed Back" and "Best Years of My Life", as well as revealing the album title and cover art in a press release. "Stop, Drop and Roll One" was released as the fourth track on October 12. On October 17, the Annies debuted a fifth track, "Sugar Daddy", releasing it immediately following a performance on the CMT Artists of the Year telecast. "Masterpiece" was released on October 26.

== Critical reception ==
Professional ratings
Aggregate scores
Source	Rating
AnyDecentMusic?	8.0/10
Metacritic	85/100
Review scores
Source	Rating
AllMusic	4.5/5 stars
Exclaim!	9/10
The Guardian	4/5 stars
Newsday	3.5/4 stars
Pitchfork	8.0/10
PopMatters	7/10
Rolling Stone	4/5 stars
Uncut	8/10
Vice (Expert Witness)	A

The album received widespread critical acclaim. At Metacritic, which assigns a normalized rating out of 100 to reviews from mainstream publications, the album received an average score of 85, based on 9 reviews.

Rolling Stone ranked "Got My Name Changed Back" at #143 on its 200 Greatest Country Songs of All Time ranking in May 2024.

== Commercial performance ==
Interstate Gospel debuted at number fifteen on the US Billboard 200 and at number one on the Top Country Albums chart with first week sales of 26,500 copies in pure album sales (30,000 in equivalent album units). The album is also Pistol Annies' first number one on the Americana/Folk Albums chart.

As of March 2020, the album has sold 80,700 copies in the United States.

In the United Kingdom, Interstate Gospel debuted at number one on the UK Country Albums chart.

== Track listing ==
All tracks written by Miranda Lambert, Ashley Monroe and Angaleena Presley, except "This Too Shall Pass", which was written by Monroe and Presley.

No.	Title	Lead vocals	Length
1.	"Interstate Prelude"	Presley, Monroe	1:06
2.	"Stop, Drop and Roll One"	Lambert, Monroe, Presley	3:02
3.	"Best Years of My Life"	Monroe, Presley, Lambert	3:42
4.	"5 Acres of Turnips"	Presley, Lambert	2:55
5.	"When I Was His Wife"	Lambert, Monroe, Presley	3:29
6.	"Cheyenne"	Lambert	4:16
7.	"Got My Name Changed Back"	Lambert	2:54
8.	"Sugar Daddy"	Lambert, Presley, Monroe	3:38
9.	"Leavers Lullaby"	Monroe	4:01
10.	"Milkman"	Lambert, Presley, Monroe	3:22
11.	"Commissary"	Presley	3:35
12.	"Masterpiece"	Lambert	4:38
13.	"Interstate Gospel"	Presley, Monroe	3:01
14.	"This Too Shall Pass"	Presley, Monroe	3:02
Total length:			46:41

== Personnel ==
Adapted from the album liner notes.

Pistol Annies

- Miranda Lambert – lead vocals, backing vocals
- Ashley Monroe – lead vocals, backing vocals
- Angaleena Presley – lead vocals, backing vocals, acoustic guitar

Additional musicians

- Chuck Leavell – acoustic piano
- Dan Dugmore – Wurlitzer electric piano, additional acoustic piano, electric guitars, dobro, steel guitar
- Frank Carter Rische – acoustic guitar, electric guitars
- Fats Kaplin – acoustic guitar, steel guitar, fiddle
- Glenn Worf – bass
- Matt Chamberlain – drums, percussion
- Chris Coleman – brass

=== Production ===
- Frank Liddell – producer
- Glenn Worf – producer
- Eric Masse – producer, recording, mixing
- Paul Hornsby – additional recording
- Dan Davis – mix assistant
- Anna Lise Liddell – mix assistant
- Stephen Marcussen – mastering at Marcussen Mastering (Hollywood, California)
- Stewart Whitmore – mastering assistant
- Brittany Hamlin – production coordination
- Tracy Baskette Fleaner – creative direction
- Stephanie Eatherly – art direction
- Miller Mobley – photography
- Lindsay Doyle – hair, make-up, styling
- Tiffany Gifford – hair, make-up, styling
- Leah Hoffman – hair, make-up, styling
- Johnny Lavoy – hair, make-up, styling
- Moani Lee – hair, make-up, styling

== Charts ==
=== Weekly charts ===
Chart (2018)	Peak position
Australian Digital Albums (ARIA)	18
Canadian Albums (Billboard)	90
Scottish Albums (Official Charts)	33
UK Country Albums (Official Charts)	1
US Billboard 200	15
US Top Country Albums (Billboard)	1

=== Year-end charts ===
Chart (2018)	Position
US Top Country Albums (Billboard)	90
Chart (2019)	Position
US Top Country Albums (Billboard)	98
