= Sparrow (Ashley Monroe album) =

Studio album by Ashley Monroe
- Released: April 20, 2018
- Recorded: 2017
- Studios: RCA Studio A (Nashville, Tennessee)
- Genres: Country; gospel; folk
- Length: 43:18
- Label: Warner Bros. Nashville
- Producer: Dave Cobb

Ashley Monroe chronology
Live at Third Man Records (2016)	Sparrow (2018)	Rosegold (2021)

Singles from Sparrow
- 1. "Hands on You" Released: February 23, 2018

Sparrow is the fourth studio album by American country music artist Ashley Monroe, released on April 20, 2018, through Warner Bros. Nashville. The album was produced by Dave Cobb and recorded in the iconic RCA Studio A. It was preceded by the lead single "Hands on You", which was later covered by Lorrie Morgan on her 2024 album Dead Girl Walking.

== Background ==
In an interview with Rolling Stone, Monroe said "I knew I wanted to work with Dave; all of his records are consistently awesome and classic, timeless, old and new all in one". Monroe also teamed with notable writer-artists Brendan Benson and Waylon Payne, including on the seductive "Wild Love", and with longtime friends Angaleena Presley and Anderson East, recording the album while pregnant with son Dalton, who was born in August 2017. In a press release to CMT she stated "To me, this record is about acknowledging past hurt, forgiveness and freedom to move forward. The most terrible things that happen to you are the most beautiful songs. That's what I respect most about music."

Sonically, Monroe lists country pop-oriented material by Glen Campbell, Shelby Lynne, Waylon Jennings and Elvis Presley as influences, particularly for their use of strings. She also mentioned listening to albums by Elton John and Rick Hall during recording.

== Critical reception ==
Professional ratings
Aggregate scores
Source	Rating
AnyDecentMusic?	8.0/10
Metacritic	86/100
Review scores
Source	Rating
AllMusic	4.5/5 stars
Exclaim!	9/10
Paste	8.9/10
Pitchfork	7.7/10
PopMatters	8/10
Slant Magazine	4/5 stars
Uncut	8/10

Sparrow received widespread acclaim from music critics. At Metacritic, which assigns a normalized rating out of 100 to reviews from mainstream critics, the album has an average score of 86, based on 8 reviews, indicating "universal acclaim". Stephen Thomas Erlewine of AllMusic called it "sharply constructed as an album, setting a mood with its first song and then finding variations on this lush, enveloping sound." Thierry Côté from Exclaim! concluded his review saying "She has crafted a captivating Southern Gothic country-soul masterpiece, one that can stand proudly next to the timeless works that inspired it. There may not be a better record to come out of Nashville in 2018."

== Commercial performance ==
The album debuted at No. 21 on Billboard's Top Country Albums, selling 4,900 copies in the first week. It has sold 8,000 copies in the United States as of June 2018.

== Track listing ==
Credits adapted from Rolling Stone.

No.	Title	Writer(s)	Length
1.	"Orphan"	Ashley Monroe; Gordie Sampson; Paul Moak	4:28
2.	"Hard on a Heart"	Monroe; Moak; Blu Sanders	3:25
3.	"Hands on You"	Monroe; Jon Randall	3:52
4.	"Mother's Daughter"	Monroe; Brendan Benson; Ryan Beaver	3:50
5.	"Rita"	Monroe; Moak; Nicolle Galyon	3:27
6.	"Wild Love"	Monroe; Benson; Waylon Payne	3:51
7.	"This Heaven"	Monroe; Anderson East; Aaron Raitiere	3:53
8.	"I'm Trying To"	Monroe; Randall; Kassi Ashton	3:44
9.	"She Wakes Me Up"	Monroe; Moak; Payne	2:26
10.	"Paying Attention"	Monroe; Benson; Payne	3:38
11.	"Daddy I Told You"	Monroe; Angaleena Presley; Josh O'Keefe	3:28
12.	"Keys to the Kingdom"	Monroe; Payne	3:13
Total length:			43:18

== Personnel ==
Credits adapted from AllMusic.

Musicians

- Ashley Monroe – vocals, backing vocals, Mellotron (7)
- Michael Webb – acoustic piano (1, 2, 5–12), keyboards (1–5, 8, 9, 11), Mellotron (7)
- Dave Cobb – acoustic guitars (1, 2, 4–12), electric guitars (3, 6–8), percussion (3–6, 9)
- Brian Allen – bass, cello (6)
- Chris Powell – drums, percussion (3–6, 9)
- Carole Rabinowitz – cello
- Kristin Wilkinson – viola
- David Angel – first violin
- Karen Winklemann – second violin (1, 2, 5, 6, 10, 12), string arrangements
- Waylon Payne – backing vocals (6)

Production

- Cris Lacy – A&R direction
- Dave Cobb – producer
- Eddie Spear – engineer, mixing
- Gena Johnson – assistant engineer
- Brightman Music – production coordination
- Jamie Young – artist development
- Shane Tarleton – creative direction
- Mike Moore – art direction, design
- Hannah Burton – photography
- Leah Eddmenson – hair stylist
- Lindsay Doyle – make-up
- Tiffany Gifford – wardrobe
- Crystal Dishmon – management
- Marion Kraft – management

== Charts ==
Chart (2018)	Peak position
US Billboard 200	157
US Top Country Albums (Billboard)	21

== Release history ==
Region	Date	Format(s)	Label	Ref.
United States	April 20, 2018	CD; digital download; vinyl	Warner Bros. Nashville	
