= Hell on Heels =

Studio album by Pistol Annies
- Released: August 23, 2011
- Recorded: 2010
- Studio: Blackbird Studio, Wrucke's House Studio and Sound Stage Studios (Nashville, Tennessee)
- Genre: Country
- Length: 30:05
- Label: Columbia Nashville
- Producer: Frank Liddell; Mike Wrucke; Chuck Ainlay; Glenn Worf

Pistol Annies chronology
Hell on Heels (2011)	Annie Up (2013)

Singles from Hell on Heels
- 1. "Hell on Heels" Released: June 12, 2011

Hell on Heels is the first studio album by American country girl group Pistol Annies. The group consists of Miranda Lambert, Ashley Monroe, and Angaleena Presley. They released their single, "Hell on Heels," in May 2011 and released their debut album on August 23, 2011. Pistol Annies debuted at Number 1 on Billboard's Country Album Chart with their introductory album, Hell On Heels. With more than 44,000 albums sold in the first week, with little to no promotion, the group landed at Number 5 on the Billboard 200 Chart. As of June 5, 2013, the album has sold 488,000 copies in the United States.

== Critical reception ==
Professional ratings
Aggregate scores
Source	Rating
Metacritic	84/100
Review scores
Source	Rating
AllMusic	5/5 stars
American Songwriter	3/5 stars
The A.V. Club	B+
MSN Music (Expert Witness)	A
Nash Country Weekly	4/5 stars
Rolling Stone	4/5 stars
Slant Magazine	4/5 stars

Review aggregate site Metacritic gave the album a score of 84/100, based on 9 reviews, earning the summary "Universal acclaim". Karlie Justus of Engine 145 gave the single a "thumbs up", with her review saying, "But beyond its cleverly delivered lyrics and well-framed production, the best part about this initial showcase is the clear intent that seems to drive both the song and the group behind its singers." It received four stars from Matt Bjorke of Roughstock, who thought that it had "sassiness and a spark". Rating it four stars out of five, Jessica Phillips of Country Weekly praised the "sparse production, unabashedly country lyrics and strong rhythm sections". In addition, Rolling Stone listed the album at 29 of the "50 Best Albums of 2011". As of December 2012, the album has sold 430,000 copies without one big radio hit.

== Track listing ==
No.	Title	Writer(s)	Lead vocals	Length
1.	"Hell on Heels"	Miranda Lambert; Ashley Monroe; Angaleena Presley	Presley; Lambert; Monroe	3:14
2.	"Lemon Drop"	Presley	Presley	2:42
3.	"Beige"	Lambert; Monroe	Monroe	3:23
4.	"Bad Example"	Lambert; Monroe; Presley	Lambert; Presley; Monroe	2:52
5.	"Housewife's Prayer"	Lambert; Monroe; Presley	Lambert	2:48
6.	"Takin' Pills"	Lambert; Monroe; Presley	Lambert; Monroe; Presley	3:16
7.	"Boys From the South"	Lambert; Monroe	Lambert	3:39
8.	"The Hunter's Wife"	Presley	Presley	2:34
9.	"Trailer for Rent"	Lambert	Lambert	3:01
10.	"Family Feud"	Lambert; Monroe; Presley; Blake Shelton	Monroe; Presley; Lambert	2:36
Total length:				30:05

== Personnel ==
Pistol Annies

- Miranda Lambert – lead vocals, backing vocals
- Ashley Monroe – lead vocals, backing vocals
- Angaleena Presley – lead vocals, backing vocals

Musicians

- Michael Webb – keyboards (1–3, 5–7)
- Joshua Grange – guitars (1–3, 5–7), steel guitar (1–3, 5–7)
- Stuart Mathis – guitars (1–3, 5–7)
- Mike Wrucke – guitars (1–3, 5–7)
- Richard Bennett – guitars (4, 8–10)
- Jay Joyce – guitars (4, 8–10)
- Randy Scruggs – guitars (4, 8–10)
- Russ Pahl – steel guitar (1–3, 5–7)
- Glenn Worf – bass
- Fred Eltringham – drums (1–3, 5–7)
- Matt Chamberlain – drums (4, 8–10)

=== Production ===
- Frank Liddell – producer
- Mike Wrucke – producer (1–3, 5–7), recording (1–3, 5–7), mixing (1–3, 5–7), digital editing (1–3, 5–7)
- Chuck Ainlay – producer (4, 8–10), recording (4, 8–10), mixing (4, 8–10), digital editing (4, 8–10)
- Glenn Worf – producer (4, 8–10)
- Nick Kallstrom – mix assistant (1–3, 5–7)
- Ryan Krieg – recording assistant (4, 8–10)
- Brandon Schexnayder – recording assistant (4, 8–10)
- Richard Dodd – mastering at RichardDodd.com (Nashville, Tennessee)
- Brittany Hamlin – production coordinator
- Judy Forde-Blair– creative production, album notes
- Tracy Baskette-Fleaner – art direction, design
- Randee St. Nicholas – photography
- Tammie Harris Cleek – imaging/photoshoot production
- Tiffany Gifford – stylist
- Philip Carreon – hair
- Marco Bernardi – hair, make-up
- Myah Morales – make-up

== Charts ==
=== Weekly charts ===
Chart (2011)	Peak position
US Billboard 200	5
US Top Country Albums (Billboard)	1

=== Year-end charts ===
Chart (2011)	Position
US Top Country Albums (Billboard)	44
Chart (2012)	Position
US Billboard 200	109
US Top Country Albums (Billboard)	24

=== Singles ===
Year	Single	Peak positions
Year	Single	US
2011	"Hell on Heels"	55

== Certifications ==
Region	Certification
United States (RIAA)	Gold
