= The Blade (Ashley Monroe album) =

Studio album by Ashley Monroe
- Released: July 24, 2015
- Studios: The House and Blackbird Studio (Nashville, Tennessee); Hound's Ear Studio (Franklin, Tennessee)
- Genre: Neotraditional Country
- Length: 46:40
- Label: Warner Bros. Nashville
- Producers: Vince Gill; Justin Niebank

Ashley Monroe chronology
Like a Rose (2013)	The Blade (2015)	Live at Third Man Records (2016)

Singles from The Blade
- 1. "On to Something Good" Released: March 9, 2015

The Blade is the third studio album by American country music artist Ashley Monroe, released on July 24, 2015, through Warner Bros. Nashville. The album was produced by Vince Gill and Justin Niebank and includes the lead single "On to Something Good." The album made numerous "Best Albums of 2015" lists and was nominated for Best Country Album at the 58th Grammy Awards.

The title track was covered by Ronnie Dunn for his 2022 album 100 Proof Neon.

== Promotion ==
In support of the album, Monroe toured with Little Big Town throughout the summer of 2015. Monroe then embarked on a headlining tour, "The Blade Tour," in the fall of 2015.

Promotional appearances in the media included a live performance of "Winning Streak" on The Tonight Show Starring Jimmy Fallon on July 27, 2015, "The Blade" on ABC's The View on August 6, 2015, and "I Buried Your Love Alive" on Conan on August 26, 2015.

== Critical reception ==
Professional ratings
Aggregate scores
Source	Rating
AnyDecentMusic?	7.8/10
Metacritic	86/100
Review scores
Source	Rating
AllMusic	4.5/5 stars
The A.V. Club	A−
Billboard	4/5 stars
Mojo	4/5 stars
Nash Country Weekly	A−
Paste	8.9/10
Pitchfork	7.5/10
Rolling Stone	4/5 stars
Spin	7/10
Uncut	8/10

The Blade received acclaim from music critics. At Metacritic, which assigns a normalized rating out of 100 to reviews from mainstream critics, the album has an average score of 86 out of 100, which indicates "universal acclaim" based on 14 reviews.

Rolling Stone's Will Hermes gave the album four stars believing "The Blade dials it back...[for] You won't know whether to whoop or weep...It's a beautiful thing." Stephen Thomas Erlewine of AllMusic rated the album four and a half out of five stars and states: "She rolls easy, luxuriating in that exquisite sound, her soft touch making the heartbreak and the humor seem equally alluring." The four out of five star review Jewly Hight delivered for Billboard was for Monroe's ability to "sing these songs, many of which she co-wrote, with exquisite, bruised sensitivity." It was Spin's "album of the week," and in a seven out of ten rating Alfred Soto writes: "A couple of wooly moments aside, Monroe's third album, The Blade, continues a remarkable hot streak for writers Luke Laird, Jessi Alexander, Chris Stapleton, and Monroe herself." Robert Ham for Paste rated the album an 8.9 out of ten, succinctly sums-up the album, for being a "heartfelt and engaging" affair. This album got an A− from Nash Country Weekly, Tammy Ragusa realizes the release cements Monroe "as one of the premiere and rare female neo-traditionalists in the format." Sam C. Mac, gave the release an A− rating on behalf of The A.V. Club, informs the listener, "The majority of Monroe's superb third album hunkers down with heartache and struggle." Judging the album to be a B+ release, Glenn Gamboa writes for Newsday, asking a hypothetical question: "Monroe is still sorting out her own sound, but who can complain when that process is so compelling?" This album got an eight out of ten stars rating by PopMatters, Dave Heaton reminds it's not how many questions of pain with regards to the release, rather in hearing them, "they sound splendid." The release got a 7.5 out of ten from Pitchfork, Stephen M. Deusner marginally derides, "The Blade could be stronger if it was more streamlined and sequenced with some kind of overarching narrative in mind, but that's almost beside the point when the album sounds so damn good."

Meet-Country.com praised the album, in particular the title track, stating "“The Blade” is the crown jewel on the whole album. Although not penned by Ashley herself, she still took command on this one and sings it as if its one of her own. On the flip side, the narrator is the one who is still in love with someone who isn't in love with them."

=== Accolades ===
Year	Association	Category	Result
2016	Grammy Awards	Best Country Album	Nominated

Publication	Rank	List
AllMusic	N/A	AllMusic Best of 2015
AllMusic	N/A	Best Country Albums of 2015
American Songwriter	18	Top 50 Albums of 2015
Nashville Scene	3	Best Country Albums of 2015
NPR	N/A	50 Favorite Albums of 2015
Paste	37	The 50 Best Albums of 2015
PopMatters	38	The 80 Best Albums of 2015
PopMatters	1	The Best Country Music of 2015
Rolling Stone	38	50 Best Albums of 2015
Rolling Stone	5	40 Best Country Albums of 2015
Time	1	Top 10 Best Albums of 2015

== Track listing ==
No.	Title	Writer(s)	Length
1.	"On to Something Good"	Ashley Monroe, Barry Dean, Luke Laird	3:50
2.	"I Buried Your Love Alive"	Monroe, Matraca Berg	3:14
3.	"Bombshell"	Monroe, Steve McEwan, Gordie Sampson	3:17
4.	"Weight of the Load"	Monroe, Vince Gill	3:59
5.	"The Blade"	Marc Beeson, Jamie Floyd, Allen Shamblin	3:27
6.	"Winning Streak"	Monroe, Jessi Alexander, Chris Stapleton	3:10
7.	"From Time to Time"	Monroe, Justin Davis, Sarah Zimmermann	4:03
8.	"If Love Was Fair"	Monroe, Alexander, Steve Moakler	3:48
9.	"Has Anybody Ever Told You"	Monroe, Tyler Cain	3:52
10.	"Dixie"	Monroe, Davis, Zimmermann	3:26
11.	"If the Devil Don't Want Me"	Monroe, Alexander, Stapleton	3:40
12.	"Mayflowers"	Monroe, Brendan Benson	3:40
13.	"I'm Good at Leavin'"	Monroe, Alexander, Miranda Lambert	3:14
Total length:			46:40

== Personnel ==
Credits adapted from AllMusic.

Musicians

- Ashley Monroe – lead vocals
- Tony Harrell – keyboards, Hammond B3 organ (7)
- Tim Lauer – keyboards (1, 2)
- Justin Niebank – keyboards (1, 3, 7, 8), percussion (1, 3, 5, 7–9), acoustic guitar (9), electric guitar (10)
- Charlie Judge – keyboards (5), Hammond B3 organ (6), synthesizers (8), strings (9)
- Tom Bukovac – electric guitar
- Danny Rader – acoustic guitar (1), electric guitar (1), mandola (1)
- Derek Wells – electric guitar (1, 3, 8)
- Richard Bennett – electric guitar (2–13)
- Vince Gill – acoustic guitar (2–5, 7, 8, 10–13), electric guitar (8, 11, 13), dulcimer (9)
- Paul Franklin – steel guitar (1–9, 11–13)
- Jimmie Lee Sloas – bass (1)
- Michael Rhodes – bass (2–13)
- Fred Eltringham – drums
- Eric Darken – percussion (3, 8)
- Anthony LaMarchina – cello (9)
- Charles Dixon – viola (9), violin (9)
- Stuart Duncan – fiddle (10–13)

Backing vocalists

- Ashley Monroe – backing vocals (1, 3, 4, 7, 13)
- Vince Gill – backing vocals (1–4, 7–11, 13)
- Charlie Worsham – backing vocals (1)
- Miranda Lambert – backing vocals (5)
- Paul Martin – backing vocals (6)
- Harry Stinson – backing vocals (6)
- Marty Stuart – backing vocals (6)
- Sarah Zimmermann – backing vocals (7)
- Alison Krauss – backing vocals (12)
- Dan Tyminski – backing vocals (12)
- Jeff White – backing vocals (13)

Production

- Cris Lacy – A&R direction
- Vince Gill – producer
- Justin Niebank – producer, recording, mixing
- Drew Bollman – additional recording, recording assistant, mix assistant
- Matt Rausch – additional recording, recording assistant, mix assistant
- Brian David Willis – digital editing
- Andrew Mendelson – mastering at Georgetown Masters (Nashville, Tennessee)
- Andrew Darby – mastering assistant
- Steven Dewey – mastering assistant
- Adam Grover – mastering assistant
- Mike "Frog" Griffith – production coordinator
- Shane Tarleton – creative director
- Mike Moore – art direction, design
- Joseph Llanes – photography
- Karolina Kangas – hair, make-up
- Tiffany Gifford – wardrobe
- John Grady – management
- Justin Luffman – management

== Chart performance ==
The Blade debuted at number 30 on the US Billboard 200 chart and number 2 on the Billboard Top Country Albums chart with 12,000 pure album sales during its first week of release. As of June 2016, the album has sold 38,600 copies in the US.

=== Album ===
Chart (2015)	Peak position
UK Country Albums (Official Charts)	3
US Billboard 200	30
US Top Country Albums (Billboard)	2

=== Singles ===
Year	Song	Chart	Peak position
2015	"On to Something Good"	US Country Airplay	53

== Release history ==
Region	Date	Format(s)	Label
United States	July 24, 2015	CD; digital download; vinyl	Warner Bros. Nashville
