= Satisfied (Ashley Monroe album) =

Studio album by Ashley Monroe
- Released: May 19, 2009
- Genre: Country
- Length: 36:08
- Label: Sony
- Producer: Mark Wright

Ashley Monroe chronology
Ashley Monroe and Trent Dabbs (2007)	Satisfied (2009)	Ashley Monroe (2009)

Alternative cover
- 2006 Advanced CD Release

Singles from Satisfied
- 1. "Satisfied" Released: 2006; 2. "I Don't Want To" Released: 2006

Satisfied is the debut studio album by American country artist Ashley Monroe. It was officially released on May 19, 2009, by Sony Music Entertainment and was produced by Mark Wright.

Satisfied was originally intended for release in the summer of 2006. However, its debut was continually postponed due to the lack of the singles' commercial success. Satisfied spawned the title track and "I Don't Want To" as radio singles, both failing to become major hits on the Billboard country survey. Although an advanced CD copy was issued in 2006, it remained unofficially unreleased for several years. The project was finally released as a music download to online retailers in 2009.

== Background and content ==
Ashley Monroe was signed to Nashville's division of Sony Music Entertainment after securing a publishing contract at age nineteen. She began recording music for the album shortly after. The material chosen for Satisfied focused on emotions associated with the death of her father. As a teenager, Monroe's father died from Pancreatic cancer. Matt Clark of Engine 145 described the album's emotional depth, stating, "Satisfied is the culmination of six years of therapeutic and deeply personal artistry and Monroe’s heartbreak over the loss of her idyllic family life is the dominant theme of the album. At times it is difficult to tell whether Monroe is more heartbroken for the “normal" experiences that she has lost or for the inability of others to appreciate the love and stability that she once took for granted."

Monroe wrote or co-wrote seven of the album's twelve original songs. She collaborated with friend Sally Barris and Nashville songwriter Brett James on several of the tracks. The title track was co-written by both Monroe and Barris. "Make Room at the Bottom" and "Hank's Cadillac" were collaborative writing efforts between James and Monroe. "Can't Let Go" was first recorded by Alternative country artist Lucinda Williams. "Pony" was written and first recorded by Australian country singer-songwriter Kasey Chambers. Two of the album's tracks are duets with other country artists. The sixth track "That's Why We Call Each Other Baby" is a duet with Dwight Yoakam and the twelfth track entitled "I Don't Want To" is a duet with Ronnie Dunn of Brooks & Dunn.

== Critical reception ==
Professional ratings
Review scores
Source	Rating
Engine 145	3.5/5 stars

Satisfied was generally met with positive reviews from music critics and online journalists. AllMusic compared the record's musical sound to that of classic country performers, "Unlike many contemporary country singers, Monroe has an old-school Nashville sound voice. Indeed, on her debut single, "Satisfied," and the impassioned ballad "I Don't Wanna Be," Monroe sounds startlingly like the young Dolly Parton. A solid set made for modern-day country radio, SATISFIED is a promising debut."

Clark gave Satisfied three and a half out of five stars. He often criticized the record label's choices of what was included on the final record, "There is a fine line between thematic cohesiveness and redundancy, and Monroe’s occasional trespasses keep this album from soaring. By the time the casual listener reaches the end of the album, he or she could be forgiven for thinking that some of the songs have been done before. Nonetheless, it is a remarkable and refreshingly authentic debut effort from a promising female artist." Clark also notes that Monroe's voice eludes the album's weak spots, "At times Monroe's writing seems naïve and simplistic, but her vocal ability more than makes up for the imperfections. It is difficult to tell whether her naivety is a sign of immaturity or a vestige of a thirteen-year old's shattered conception of domestic tranquility." Peter Cronin from the Country Music Association originally stated in 2006 that, "Satisfied, released on June 27 on Columbia Records, proves that Monroe has found an artistic voice that is uniquely her own."

== Release and commercial performance ==
The title track from Satisfied was give release in early 2006 as an advanced single. The song became a minor hit on the Billboard Hot Country Songs chart that year, only reaching the forty third position. Because the single did not perform well commercially, the album's original release date of June 27, 2006, was pushed back. Satisfied was briefly sold to online digital music distributors during this time frame. Also, it was briefly distributed in advanced copies via a CD format. Meanwhile, "I Don't Want To" was chosen to be the second single for the album and was released in late 2006. The song peaked at number thirty seven on the Hot Country Songs chart and Satisfied was still left unreleased. In hopes of issuing the record, Monroe did an exclusive sixteen-week radio tour in 2006.

Several reasons help explain the delay of the album's initial release. Sony Music Entertainment was hesitant to release Satisfied until one of its singles would reach the "top-twenty" of the Hot Country Songs chart. Secondly, the label merged with the larger BMG Rights Management in 2007. BMG was against releasing previously recorded material. Stephen L. Betts of the online music site The Boot wrote that Satisfied was a difficult album for radio DJ's to market. Betts also explains how it led to Monroe's departure with her record label, "... Ashley signed to Sony Music. Radio programmers (some moved to tears after hearing her deeply confessional songs), however, couldn’t fit her music to their format. Her one album for Sony, the boldly traditional Satisfied, remained largely unreleased and Ashley and the label parted ways in 2007." The album's delay also caused negative reactions from the music industry at large. Music critic Matt Clark from Engine Clark quoted, "...I will not forgive Sony if they succeed in squandering the potential of Columbia recording artist Ashley Monroe, who has recorded the best country debut album since Lambert’s Kerosene."

The album was eventually released by Monroe's former label as a digital download on May 19, 2009. It was exclusively sold to online digital stores, including iTunes. With the new release changes were made to the original track listing. "I Don't Want To" was not included in the new release. Additionally, a new twelfth track entitled "Promised Land" was featured as a bonus track.

== Track listing ==
Standard 2009 digital edition
No.	Title	Writer(s)	Length
1.	"I Don't Wanna Be"	Ashley Monroe, Sally Barris	4:18
2.	"Pony"	Kasey Chambers	4:38
3.	"Satisfied"	Monroe, Barris	2:52
4.	"Used"	Monroe, Barris	3:56
5.	"Can't Let Go"	Randy Weeks	3:07
6.	"That's Why We Call Each Other Baby" (duet with Dwight Yoakam)	Jim Collins, Matraca Berg	3:05
7.	"Make Room at the Bottom"	Monroe, Brett James	3:13
8.	"Let Me Down Again"	Keith Gattis	3:09
9.	"Pain, Pain"	Monroe, Gattis	2:05
10.	"Hank's Cadillac"	Monroe, James	3:56
11.	"He Ain't Coming Back"	Monroe, Barris, Jon McElroy	3:10
Total length:			36:08

Advanced promotional CD release
No.	Title	Length
1.	"I Don't Wanna Be"
2.	"Pony"
3.	"Satisfied"
4.	"Used"
5.	"Can't Let Go"
6.	"That's Why We Call Each Other Baby" (duet with Dwight Yoakam)
7.	"Make Room at the Bottom"
8.	"Let Me Down Again"
9.	"Pain, Pain"
10.	"Hank's Cadillac"
11.	"He Ain't Coming Back"
12.	"I Don't Want To" (duet with Ronnie Dunn)	3:54

Amazon Bonus Track
No.	Title	Length
12.	"Promised Land"	4:55

iTunes Bonus Track
No.	Title	Length
12.	"I Can't Unlove You"	3:33

== Personnel ==
- Ashley Monroe – lead vocals

Additional Musicians

- Ronnie Dunn – background vocals
- Dwight Yoakam – background vocals

Technical personnel

- Mark Wright – record producer

== Charts ==
Singles

Title	Year	Peak chart positions
Title	Year	US Country
"Satisfied"	2006	43
"I Don't Want To" (with Ronnie Dunn)	2006	37
