= Vanessa Olivarez =

American singer, songwriter and actress (born 1981)

- Born: Vanessa Denae Olivarez; April 7, 1981 (age 45); Sugar Land, Texas, U.S.
- Genres: Country; country rock; pop
- Occupations: Singer, songwriter, actress
- Instruments: Vocals, drums
- Member of: Butterfly Stitch
- Formerly of: Granville Automatic; Mama's Blue Dress
- Website: granvilleautomatic.com

Vanessa Denae Olivarez (born April 7, 1981) is an American singer, songwriter, and actress. She is the vocalist, songwriter, and autoharpist for the country bands Granville Automatic and Mama's Blue Dress, has written songs for the country duo Sugarland, and was in the Top 12 of the second season of the television series American Idol in 2003.

Later that year, she released a single, "The One", which peaked at number nine on the Canadian charts. In 2004, she played Tracy Turnblad, the lead role in the Canadian version of Hairspray, for which she was nominated for a Dora Award.

== American Idol ==
Olivarez's friends talked her into auditioning in 2002 for the second season of American Idol. She performed Irene Cara's "Out Here On My Own" in the semi-finals. During a following round where contestants write their own numbers, Olivarez impressed the judges with her song "The Only Thing Special About You Is Me". She moved into the top 32 contestants of the season. When she reached the top judges she switched to Queen's "Bohemian Rhapsody". They compared her to singer and actress Bette Midler. She was in the final twelve and she performed The Supremes' "You Keep Me Hangin' On". Soon after she was eliminated from American Idol, she lent her celebrity status to support animals' rights group People for the Ethical Treatment of Animals. She posed naked for their "I would rather go naked than wear fur" campaign. The ad was first unveiled in Herald Square in middle of Manhattan and also ran in Atlanta. She also did a benefit for Atlanta Humane Society and The Station nightclub fire.

== Canada and first singles ==
In 2003, Olivarez was contacted by Canadian songwriter and actor James Collins who brought her to Toronto, Canada, to write and record some new music. Her first single, "The One", co-written by Olivarez, James Collins and Dave Pickell, had "I'm In Love with My Best Friend's Ex" as a B-side, and reached number nine on Canada's single charts & Top Thirty on the Canadian BDS airplay chart. Another of her songs, "As Vain As You" (also co-written with Collins & Pickell), was on the compilation album Girls Night Out 3.

She played Tracy Turnblad in the Canadian version of the musical Hairspray. After Hairspray she returned to the United States and joined an Atlanta musical group Butterfly Stitch which released an EP and live album.

In May 2005 she appeared in an American Idol theme week on Family Feud.

== Granville Automatic ==
In 2009 she co-founded Granville Automatic, a country duo, with guitarist and songwriter Elizabeth Elkins who is a grand prize winner of the John Lennon Songwriting Contest. They are named after a 19th-Century typewriter, and collaborate to write and perform songs about history. They recorded an eight-song set for an episode of PBS' Sun Studio Sessions (taped at Memphis' Sun Studio) and the digital-only EP Live from Sun Studio is available online. Their self-titled album, Granville Automatic, came out in 2012. Their second album, An Army Without Music, was released in 2015 and is a collection of songs inspired by Civil War battles.

== Boys Club for Girls ==
In 2019 she joined with Amie Miriello to form the Americana duo, Boys Club for Girls. On January 27, 2020, they released a video for the song "The Weatherman" off their album expected to release later in the year.

== Awards and nominations ==
Year	Award	Category	Result
2005	Dora Mavor Moore Awards	Outstanding Performance by a Female in a Principal Role - Musical (As lead Tracy Turnblad in the Canadian production of Hairspray)	Nominated

== Discography ==
=== Albums ===
- Granville Automatic - "Granville Automatic" - Release date: May 1, 2012
- Granville Automatic - "Live from Sun Studio" - Release date: January 31, 2012

=== Singles ===
Music Information
The One
- Released: 2003
- Charts: Number 9 Canada.

Music Information
The One (The Remixes)
- Released: 2008
