= Ashley Monroe =

American country music singer-songwriter (born 1986)

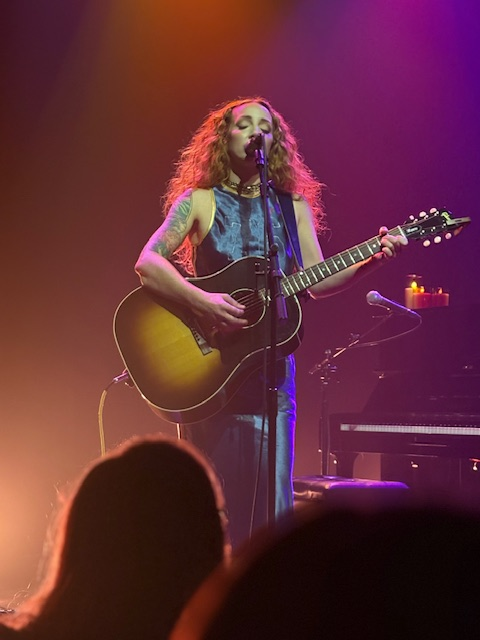
- Monroe in concert, 2025.

Background information
- Born: Ashley Lauren Monroe; September 10, 1986 (age 39)
- Origin: Knoxville, Tennessee, U.S.
- Genres: Country, Americana
- Occupation: Singer-songwriter
- Instruments: Vocals; Guitar
- Years active: 2005–present
- Labels: Columbia Nashville; Warner Bros. Nashville; Mountainrose Sparrow
- Member of: Pistol Annies
- Website: www.ashleymonroe.com www.pistolannies.com

Ashley Lauren Monroe (born September 10, 1986) is an American country music singer-songwriter.

Monroe has released two solo singles, "Satisfied" and "I Don't Want To" (which featured Brooks & Dunn singer Ronnie Dunn), that reached the U.S. Billboard Hot Country Songs chart at No. 43 and No. 37. Both singles were from her debut album, Satisfied, that was intended for a 2007 release but was pushed back. Monroe left Columbia Records' roster in late 2007 and Satisfied was finally released on May 19, 2009, under Sony Music. In June 2011, Monroe, Miranda Lambert and Angaleena Presley formed a band called Pistol Annies.

Monroe's second studio album, Like a Rose, was released on March 5, 2013, followed by her third album, The Blade, released on July 24, 2015. Her fourth studio album, Sparrow, was released on April 20, 2018.

== Early life ==
Ashley Lauren Monroe was born on September 10, 1986, in Knoxville, Tennessee. to Larry and Kellye Monroe (née Dalton). She has one older brother, Chad.

At age 11, she won a talent contest in Pigeon Forge where she sang "I Want to Be a Cowboy's Sweetheart", and found steady work at a local theater. Her parents played songs by the Eagles and Lynyrd Skynyrd. After her father died from cancer when she was 13, Monroe started to write songs to help her deal with the loss, several of which appear on her fourth album, Sparrow. A few years later, she began to perform in small clubs in Nashville.

== Career ==
=== 2007–2009: Beginnings and record label deal ===
After a year in Nashville, she gained a publishing deal as a songwriter, which then led to her signing to a record contract with Sony Records under John Grady, where she began to record her debut album, Satisfied. In 2006, the title track to the album was released as the first single to country radio. It failed to make the top 40 on the Hot Country Songs chart, however, a second single was released shortly after. "I Don't Want To" was released as the second single, which featured Ronnie Dunn of Brooks & Dunn. It initially did well on the charts, charting at No. 37.

Still after two singles, the album hadn't been released. The label then decided not to release the album until Monroe charted a top 20 single. But, no follow-up singles were ever released. iTunes briefly had the album available in July 2006 but it was removed from the online store by mid-August.

In late 2007, Monroe and Columbia Records parted ways, and Satisfied went without being released. In addition to her own material, she co-wrote Katrina Elam's 2007 single "Flat on the Floor" (which was also recorded by Carrie Underwood on her 2007 album Carnival Ride), as well as Jason Aldean's 2009 single, "The Truth", and Miranda Lambert's 2011 single, "Heart Like Mine."

In April 2009, it was announced on Monroe's MySpace page that Satisfied would be released to digital retailers (iTunes, Rhapsody, etc.) on May 19, 2009. The single "I Don't Want To" was not included.

In early 2012 Amazon.com and Spotify began streaming and selling an MP3 track called "Promised Land" that was originally recorded for, but left off of, the "Satisfied" album and now is listed as a Bonus Track.

=== 2009: Singles and Ashley Monroe EP ===
In late 2009 Monroe posted on her MySpace page that she was independently releasing a new self-titled EP. It would only be sold at the live shows. While she was touring with the Ten out of Tenn artists she realized she had nothing to sell to the fans who loved her sets and she wanted to give them something. This EP contains the tracks "Has Anybody Ever Told You", "Angeline", "Drink for Two", "And You" along with Trent Dabbs collaboration "Everything I Wanted".

=== 2013–2015: Career breakthrough with Like a Rose and The Blade ===
Ashley Monroe received a record deal with Warner Bros. Nashville and released her second studio album, Like a Rose on March 5, 2013. The album, produced by Vince Gill, was met with widespread critical acclaim. It features nine tracks co-written by the singer, one of which is a collaboration with Blake Shelton. "Like a Rose" (the title track) was released to radio as the album's first single on March 4, 2013. "Like A Rose" debuted at No. 86 at the European Top-100 Country Music Chart in late April 2013, as well as the duet with Blake Shelton "You Ain't Dolly (And You Ain't Porter)", which debuted at No. 73 and was the most played country music song in Europe according to the European CMA.

On July 24, 2015, Monroe released her third studio album, The Blade, to critical acclaim. The album, which included collaborations with Miranda Lambert, Vince Gill and Alison Krauss, earned her first Grammy Award nomination for Best Country Album.

=== 2016–2021: Live album, Sparrow, Rosegold, and break from music ===
On February 26, 2016, Monroe released a live album containing songs from her previous records and a cover of the Gram Parsons song "Hickory Wind". It was recorded at the Blue Room at Third Man Records live before an audience of 200 people on May 12, 2015. The recording was mixed live and recorded straight to acetate without the possibility for correcting any mistakes in post-production.

After taking a break to give birth to her son, Monroe announced her new album, Sparrow which was produced by Dave Cobb and would be released on Warner Bros. Nashville on April 20, 2018. Alongside the announcement, "Hands On You", a track co-written with Jon Randall, was released. Sonically, Monroe references old fashioned country pop such as Glen Campbell, Shelby Lynne, Waylon Jennings and Elvis Presley as examples of the use of strings in country music, something she has included for the first time, and also mentions Elton John and Rick Hall albums as particular influences.

Her fifth album, Rosegold, a sonically expanse project incorporating elements of pop, country, and hip hop music, was released on April 30, 2021. Monroe announced a cancer diagnosis a few months later and took a break from music in order to receive treatment, recover, and to spend time with her family.

=== 2025-present: Tennessee Lighting and Dear Nashville ===
Monroe returned to recording music after her cancer went into remission with the release of her sixth album, Tennessee Lightning on August 8, 2025.

On March 27, 2026, Monroe surprise released her seventh studio album, Dear Nashville, a concept album about her experiences in the country music industry. She produced the album herself alongside Luke Laird, and expressed that the project evolved from the writing of the lead track, "I Hate Nashville".

== Collaborations ==
=== Blake Shelton ===
As a member of the Pistol Annies, Monroe appeared on Blake Shelton's number one hit "Boys 'Round Here".

Monroe was featured on Shelton's hit "Lonely Tonight", the second single from his album Bringing Back the Sunshine, and performed the song with him at the 2015 CMA Awards. The song reached number 1 on the US County Airplay Chart and number 2 on the Hot Country Songs Chart, and earned both artists ACM and CMA nominations as well as a Grammy Award nomination for Best Country Duo/Group Performance.

=== Trent Dabbs ===
In early 2008, Monroe began collaborating with singer-songwriter Trent Dabbs and creating several demo tracks that appeared on their individual MySpace pages, before releasing an EP under both of their names. It was simply entitled Ashley Monroe and Trent Dabbs.

Other tracks have included "I'm Coming Over", "Laying Low [or I'm Staying Low]", "Now That I Know", "When the Day Is Done", "Everything I Wanted" and "Gone".

The official EP track listing however contains only five of these songs: "I'm Coming Over", "Laying Low", "See Right Through" (the only track that never appeared on MySpace), "Now That I Know" and "Gone".

Monroe can also be heard on backing vocals (as well as having writing credits) on Dabbs's song "Your Side Now".

=== Backing vocals ===
Monroe contributed backing vocals on Will Hoge's song "Goodnight/Goodbye" off his 2009 album The Wreckage. The song was released as a soft single in late 2009.

Monroe can also be heard on Cory Morrow's 2007 album Ten Years on the track "More Than Perfect". Andrea Glass's 2008 release Stood Under Stars features her on two tracks: "The Price" and "North Wind". Monroe is also featured on the title track of Wade Bowen's If We Ever Make It Home album. Most recently, on a track she co-wrote with Miranda Lambert ("Me and Your Cigarettes" found on Revolution, Miranda Lambert) she is backing vocalist.

She is also featured in the video for All I Have (Acoustic) starring Mat Kearney and an unreleased version of Fire & Rain (Acoustic) by Mat as well. She also does background vocals on the 2011 release of Josh Kelley's Georgia Clay album for the track "A Real Good Try". There was a 2011 video posted on YouTube of Monroe and Michelle Branch singing backing vocals for Chris Isaaks version of "Ring Of Fire" for his upcoming release Beyond The Sun. Additionally she co-wrote two tracks and provides backing vocals for Vince Gill on "Who Wouldn't Fall In Love With You" and "If I Die".

She is a featured vocalist on Hunter Hayes' newer version of his song "What You Gonna Do" on his 2013 album Encore and on Feels Like Home, a 2013 album by Sheryl Crow along with Vince Gill on the track "Give It To Me". It was also announced that Monroe would be performing a duet named "Lonely Tonight" with Blake Shelton on his 2014 album Bringing Back the Sunshine.

Ashley sang back up vocals on The Steel Woods 2021 album titled All Of Your Stones. The track is called I Need You.

=== Jack White's Third Man House Band ===
In late 2008, Monroe collaborated with The Raconteurs and Ricky Skaggs on The Raconteurs single "Old Enough", which was released in bluegrass form, and as a music video.

Monroe contributes backing vocals as a member of Jack White's Third Man House Band, which performed with Wanda Jackson on her album The Party Ain't Over, which was released on January 25, 2011. She is featured on the songs "Rum & Coca-Cola", "Dust on the Bible" and "Teach Me Tonight" alongside Karen Elson, dubbing themselves "The Cherry Sisters" in the liner notes. She is also given credits on the Live At Third Man Records album by Wanda Jackson having been on tour with her as part of the "Cherry Sisters". She won honors for her performances.

=== 2011–present: Activities as a member of Pistol Annies ===
Longtime friends, Monroe, Miranda Lambert and newcomer Angaleena Presley debuted their trio Pistol Annies, with their song "Hell on Heels", on April 22, 2011, on CBS' airing of ACM Girls Night Out. The trio surprised the audience in place of Lambert singing with now ex-husband Blake Shelton. The women, who all met through working in the industry, have dubbed nicknames for themselves via their band name. Lambert serves as "Lonestar Annie", Monroe as "Hippie Annie", and Presley as "Holler Annie", as she is from the hills of Kentucky. Per Lambert, whether or not the Annies would release an album would "be up to the fans". The single "Hell on Heels" was released for purchase via the Pistol Annies' website on June 12, 2011. The Pistol Annies' album Hell on Heels was released on August 23, 2011. The trio will also be featured on The Chieftain's upcoming release Voice of Ages on the track "Come All Ye Fair and Tender Ladies".

The Pistol Annies' track "Run Daddy Run" was included on the 2012 soundtrack The Hunger Games: Songs from District 12 and Beyond. They have been featured as backing vocalists on Blake Shelton's track "Blue Christmas" and on Jewel's 2013 Greatest Hits on a new version of "You Were Meant For Me". The trio also appear in the video for Blake Shelton's "Boys Round Here" video.

The Pistol Annies' second album, Annie Up, was released on May 7, 2013, and Lambert announced that a third record would be released in 2018.

On September 27, 2018, Pistol Annies announced their third album Interstate Gospel would be released November 2, 2018. They planned to host three album-debut shows in Nashville, New York, and Los Angeles. They released three songs off the album for hungry fans: Got My Name Changed Back, Interstate Gospel, and Best Days of My Life.

=== Train ===
Monroe is featured on "Bruises", a duet with Train vocalist Pat Monahan; the song was released as a single on November 9, 2012. She and Monahan starred in the music video, and she toured with Train on the Mermaids of Alcatraz Tour in summer 2013, where she sang "Bruises" and one or two of her songs from her album. She also performed with Train on The Today Show on July 26.

=== Butch Walker ===
On Butch Walker's 2016 album Stay Gold, Monroe co-wrote and provided her vocals for the track "Descending".

=== The American Epic Sessions ===
Monroe was featured in the award-winning 2017 documentary film The American Epic Sessions, directed by Bernard MacMahon. In the film she recorded two songs on the first electrical sound recording system from the 1920s - “Jubilee”, a 19th-century Appalachian folk song accompanied by The Americans, and “Like a Rose”, solo on acoustic guitar. Both performances were featured on the film's soundtrack, Music from the American Epic Sessions.

== Personal life ==
On September 14, 2012, following a show on the Pistol Annies tour, Monroe accepted a marriage proposal by boyfriend John Danks, a starting pitcher for the Chicago White Sox. She tweeted "I said yes . . . I'm engaged to my John Danks! Best night of my life!" Pistol Annies bandmate Miranda Lambert helped her with the wedding plans. They were married on October 24, 2013, at Blackberry Farm in Walland, Tennessee; Blake Shelton officiated the ceremony, and Lambert was the matron of honor.

On December 25, 2016, Monroe took to Twitter displaying an ultrasound picture to announce that she is expecting her first child. On March 19, 2017, Monroe revealed that her baby would be a boy with multiple photos on Instagram. She gave birth to her son, Dalton William Danks.

On July 13, 2021, Monroe announced that she was diagnosed with Waldenström's macroglobulinemia, a rare form of blood cancer.

== Discography ==
Solo albums

- Satisfied (2009)
- Like a Rose (2013)
- The Blade (2015)
- Sparrow (2018)
- Rosegold (2021)
- Tennessee Lightning (2025)
- Dear Nashville (2026)

with Pistol Annies

- Hell on Heels (2011)
- Annie Up (2013)
- Interstate Gospel (2018)

== Awards and nominations ==
Year	Association	Category	Nominated work	Result
2009	Country Music Association Awards	Musical Event of the Year	"Old Enough"	Nominated
2011	American Country Awards	New Artist of the Year	Pistol Annies	Nominated
2012	CMT Awards	Breakthrough Video of the Year	"Hell on Heels"	Nominated
2012	CMT Awards	Group Video of the Year	"Hell on Heels"	Nominated
2013	CMT Awards	Group Video of the Year	"Takin' Pills"	Nominated
2015	CMT Awards	Collaborative Video of the Year	"Lonely Tonight"	Nominated
2015	Academy of Country Music Awards	Vocal Event of the Year	"Lonely Tonight"	Nominated
2015	Country Music Association Awards	Musical Event of the Year	"Lonely Tonight"	Nominated
2016	Grammy Awards	Best Country Duo/Group Performance	"Lonely Tonight"	Nominated
2016	Grammy Awards	Best Country Album	The Blade	Nominated
2020	Grammy Awards	Best Country Album	Interstate Gospel	Nominated
