= Pistol Annies =

American country music group

- Origin: Nashville, Tennessee, United States
- Genres: Country
- Years active: 2010–2013; 2017–present
- Labels: Columbia Nashville; RCA Nashville
- Members: Miranda Lambert; Ashley Monroe; Angaleena Presley

Pistol Annies are an American country music group composed of Miranda Lambert, Ashley Monroe, and Angaleena Presley. The trio gave its debut performance on April 4, 2011, on the CBS special Academy of Country Music's Girls' Night Out: Superstar Women of Country. The trio have released four studio albums for Sony Music Nashville.

== Career ==
Pistol Annies made their debut on April 22, 2011, on the Academy of Country Music's Girls' Night Out: Superstar Women of Country on CBS, performing "Hell on Heels". The women gave themselves the nicknames "Lonestar Annie" (Lambert), "Hippie Annie" (Monroe), and "Holler Annie" (Presley). They released the album Hell on Heels on August 23, 2011, with the title song being released for purchase on their website two months earlier, on June 12. After a series of performances during Lambert concerts, the Pistol Annies performed three sold-out headlining shows in December 2011 with guest performances by John Fogerty and Blake Shelton.

The trio was featured on the track "Come All Ye Fair and Tender Ladies" on the 2012 album Voice of Ages by The Chieftains. The Pistol Annies song "Run Daddy Run" appears on the soundtrack album The Hunger Games: Songs from District 12 and Beyond. The band performed their autobiographical single "Takin' Pills" at the 2012 CMT Music Awards.

Annie Up, the trio's second studio album, was released on May 7, 2013. It was preceded by the lead single "Hush Hush," which became the Pistol Annies' first chart entry on the U.S. Billboard Hot Country Songs chart. The group is also featured on the Blake Shelton single, "Boys 'Round Here," from his 2013 album, Based on a True Story….

The group cancelled all tour stops in June 2013, according to their record label, "due to unforeseen circumstances". Lambert still performed as a solo act in June. Monroe went to the Mermaids of Alcatraz Tour with Train. In August 2014, Angaleena Presley confirmed that the group was on temporary hiatus, saying that due to the success of Lambert's and Monroe's solo careers, the band "just had to take a little break but never say never." Whilst promoting their appearances at the 2016 C2C festival, both Miranda Lambert and Ashley Monroe stressed that the Pistol Annies had not disbanded and intended to work together when all three members were available. They also stated their hope to one day do a UK tour.

In 2017, the Annies recorded a cover of the song "Tulsa Time" which appeared on a Don Williams tribute album titled Gentle Giants: The Songs of Don Williams which was released on May 26. In an interview with Billboard, Lambert revealed that a new Pistol Annies album would be released in 2018. On September 26, 2018, the Pistol Annies released three tracks from their latest album, Interstate Gospel, which was released on November 2, 2018. They performed a fourth track, "Sugar Daddy", at the CMT Artists of the Year telecast.

The Pistol Annies appeared in Nashville on June 6–9 for 2019 CMA Fest. In September 2019, the Pistol Annies began touring as part of Miranda Lambert's Roadside Bars and Pink Guitars tour, which ran through November 23.

== Discography ==
=== Studio albums ===
| Title | Album details | Peak chart positions | | | | Certifications (sales threshold) | Sales |
| Title | Album details | US Country | US | US Folk | CAN | Certifications (sales threshold) | Sales |
|---|---|---|---|---|---|---|---|
| Hell on Heels | Release date: August 23, 2011; Label: Columbia Nashville; Formats: CD, LP, music download | 1 | 5 | — | — | US: Gold | US: 508,902 |
| Annie Up | Release date: May 7, 2013; Label: RCA Nashville; Formats: CD, LP, music download | 2 | 5 | — | 11 | | US: 143,000 |
| Interstate Gospel | Release date: November 2, 2018; Label: RCA Nashville; Formats: CD, LP, music download | 1 | 15 | 1 | 90 | | US: 80,700 |
| Hell of a Holiday | Release date: October 22, 2021; Label: RCA Nashville; Formats: CD, LP, music download | 28 | — | 7 | — | | |
"—" denotes a recording that did not chart.

=== Singles ===
| Year | Single | Peak chart positions | | | Certifications (sales threshold) | Album |
| Year | Single | US Country Songs | US Country Airplay | US | Certifications (sales threshold) | Album |
|---|---|---|---|---|---|---|
| 2011 | "Hell on Heels" | — (Note: "Hell on Heels" did not enter Hot Country Songs, but peaked at number 6 on Billboard Country Digital Song Sales.) | — | 55 | US: Platinum | Hell on Heels |
| 2013 | "Hush Hush" | 41 | 43 | — | | Annie Up |
| 2018 | "Got My Name Changed Back” | 48 | 52 | — | | Interstate Gospel |
| 2021 | "Snow Globe" | — | — | — | | Hell of a Holiday |
"—" denotes a recording that did not chart.

==== As a featured artist ====
| Year | Single | Peak chart positions | | | | | Certifications (sales threshold) | Album |
| Year | Single | US Country Songs | US Country Airplay | US | CAN Country | CAN | Certifications (sales threshold) | Album |
|---|---|---|---|---|---|---|---|---|
| 2013 | "Boys 'Round Here" (Blake Shelton featuring Pistol Annies and friends) | 2 | 1 | 12 | 1 | 12 | US: 2× Platinum | Based on a True Story… |

=== Other charted songs ===
| Year | Single | Peak chart positions | | | Album |
| Year | Single | US Country Songs | US Country Airplay | US Bubbling | Album |
|---|---|---|---|---|---|
| 2011 | "Boys from the South" | — (Note: "Boys from the South" did not enter Hot Country Songs, but peaked at number 27 on Billboard Country Digital Song Sales.) | — | 8 | Hell on Heels |
| 2012 | "Run Daddy Run" (Miranda Lambert featuring Pistol Annies) | — (Note: "Run Daddy Run" did not enter Hot Country Songs, but peaked at number 31 on Billboard Country Digital Song Sales.) | — | — | The Hunger Games: Songs from District 12 and Beyond |
| 2012 | "Blue Christmas" (Blake Shelton featuring Pistol Annies) | — | 59 | — | Cheers, It's Christmas |
| 2013 | "I Feel a Sin Comin' On" | 43 | — | — | Annie Up |
"—" denotes a recording that did not chart.

=== Music videos ===
| Year | Video | Director |
|---|---|---|
| 2011 | "Hell on Heels" | Becky Fluke |
| 2012 | "Takin' Pills" | Becky Fluke |
| 2013 | "Boys 'Round Here" (Blake Shelton featuring Pistol Annies and friends) | Trey Fanjoy |
| 2013 | "Hush Hush" | Trey Fanjoy |
| 2018 | "Got My Name Changed Back" | Peter Zavadil |

=== Collaborations and non album tracks ===
- "Come All Ye Fair and Tender Ladies" (2012) with The Chieftains, featured on Voice of Ages
- "Run Daddy Run" (2012) featured on The Hunger Games: Songs from District 12 and Beyond
- "Blue Christmas" (2012) featured on Blake Shelton's Cheers, It's Christmas
- "You Were Meant For Me" (2013) featured on Jewel's "Greatest Hits"
- "Tulsa Time" (2017) featured on Gentle Giants: A Tribute to Don Williams"

== Awards ==
| Year | Organization | Award | Work | Result |
|---|---|---|---|---|
| 2011 | American Country Awards | New Artist of the Year | – | Nominated |
| 2012 | CMT Awards | Group Video of the Year | "Hell On Heels" | Nominated |
| 2012 | CMT Awards | Breakthrough Video of the Year | "Hell On Heels" | Nominated |
| 2013 | CMT Awards | Group Video of the Year | "Takin' Pills" | Nominated |
| 2013 | Country Music Association Awards | Music Video of the Year | "Boys 'Round Here" | Nominated |
| 2013 | Country Music Association Awards | Musical Event of the Year | "Boys 'Round Here" | Nominated |
| 2014 | Academy of Country Music Awards | Vocal Event of the Year | "Boys 'Round Here" | Nominated |
| 2020 | Grammy Awards | Best Country Album | Interstate Gospel | Nominated |
