= 2020 Canadian Country Music Awards =

Music awards ceremony in Canada

- Date: September 27, 2020
- Venue: Burl's Creek Event Grounds; Oro-Medonte, Ontario

Television/radio coverage
- Network: Global

The 2020 Canadian Country Music Awards, honouring achievements in Canadian country music in 2019 and 2020, were presented on September 27, 2020. Due to the COVID-19 pandemic in Canada, the event was presented as an outdoor ceremony from the Burl's Creek Event Grounds in Oro-Medonte, Ontario.

Performers included Dean Brody, Brett Kissel, The Reklaws, Dallas Smith, Don Amero, Jade Eagleson, Hunter Brothers, James Barker Band, Carolyn Dawn Johnson, Jojo Mason, Jess Moskaluke, Tebey and Marie-Mai at Burl's Creek, and Lindsay Ell, Carolyn Dawn Johnson, Meghan Patrick, MacKenzie Porter and Tenille Townes performing remotely from Nashville, as well as guest appearances by American country stars Tim McGraw, Kane Brown and Sam Hunt with Breland.

The ceremony was broadcast by the Global Television Network, as well as on several country radio stations owned by Corus Entertainment.

== Nominees and winners ==
Nominations were announced on July 22, 2020.

=== Music ===
Entertainer of the Year	Album of the Year
Dallas Smith; Dean Brody; Brett Kissel; The Reklaws; Tenille Townes	Brett Kissel, Now or Never; Tenille Arts, Love, Heartbreak, & Everything in Between; Dean Brody, Black Sheep; James Barker Band, Singles Only; Meghan Patrick, Wild As Me
Male Artist of the Year	Female Artist of the Year
Brett Kissel; Dean Brody; Jade Eagleson; Dallas Smith; Tebey	Tenille Townes; Lindsay Ell; Jess Moskaluke; Meghan Patrick; MacKenzie Porter
Group or Duo of the Year	Interactive Artist or Group of the Year
The Washboard Union; High Valley; Hunter Brothers; James Barker Band; The Reklaws	Lindsay Ell; Dan Davidson; Aaron Goodvin; Nice Horse; Tenille Townes
Rising Star	Fan Choice
Tenille Arts; Sons of Daughters; Matt Lang; Tyler Joe Miller; Emily Reid	Brett Kissel; Dean Brody; Jade Eagleson; Hunter Brothers; James Barker Band; MacKenzie Porter; The Reklaws; Dallas Smith; Tebey; Tenille Townes
Roots Album of the Year	Single of the Year
The Washboard Union, Everbound; Kalsey Kulyk, Kalsey Kulyk; Kelly Prescott, Love Wins; JJ Shiplett, Fingers Crossed; Donovan Woods, The Other Way	James Barker Band, "Keep It Simple"; Dean Brody, "Whiskey in a Teacup"; Jade Eagleson, "Count the Ways"; High Valley, "Single Man"; Dallas Smith, "Drop"
Songwriter of the Year	Video of the Year
Tina Parol, Gordie Sampson and Tenille Townes — Tenille Townes, "Jersey on the Wall (I'm Just Asking)"; Skip Back, Aaron Goodvin, Matt Nolen — Aaron Goodvin, "Good Ol' Bad Days"; Jeff Coplan, Tim Hicks, Bruce Wallace — Tim Hicks, "No Truck Song"; MacKenzie Porter, Jordan Sapp, Parker Welling — MacKenzie Porter, "These Days"; Brad Rempel, Ben Stennis, The Reklaws — The Reklaws, "I Do Too"	Tenille Townes, "Jersey on the Wall (I'm Just Asking)"; Brett Kissel, "Drink About Me"; Tim Hicks, "No Truck Song"; Hunter Brothers, "Silver Lining"; The Washboard Union, "Country Thunder"
Guitar Player of the Year	Bass Player of the Year
Matt McKay; Paul Chapman; Ryan Davidson; Chad Murphy; Darren Savard	Justin Kudding; Lisa Dodd; Kirby Barber; Curtis Ebner; Doug Elash; Matt Genereux
Steel Guitar Player of the Year	Drummer of the Year
Mitch Jay; Chris Altmann; Doug Johnson	Ben Bradley; Matthew Atkins; Spencer Cheyne; Flavio Cirillo; Rob Wells; Greg Williamson
Keyboard Player of the Year	Fiddle Player of the Year
Brendan Waters; Mike Little; Scott Wilkinson	Tyler Vollrath; Linsey Beckett; Tyler Beckett; Denis Dufresne; Matt Piche; Mike Sanyshyn
Specialty Instrument Player of the Year	Top Selling Canadian Single of the Year
Mitch Jay; Connor Riddell; Tyler Vollrath	Dallas Smith, "Drop"
Top Selling Canadian Album of the Year	Top Selling International Album of the Year
Dallas Smith, The Fall	Luke Combs, What You See Is What You Get

=== Radio ===
Music Director of the Year, Large Market	Music Director of the Year, Medium/Small Market
Amanda Kingsland – CKBY-FM (Ottawa, ON); A.J. Keller – CFCW (Edmonton, AB); Jaxon Hawks – CJJR-FM (Vancouver, BC); Peter Walker – CJKX-FM/CHKX-FM (Oshawa, ON/Hamilton, ON); Steph Hansen – CISN-FM/CKRY-FM (Edmonton, AB/Calgary, AB)	Shilo Bellis – CJXL-FM (Moncton, NB); Cal Gratton – CJVR-FM (Melfort, SK); Luca James – CKGY-FM (Red Deer, AB); Paul Ferguson – CHCQ-FM (Belleville, ON); Peter Morena – CKYY-FM (St. Catharines, ON)
Radio Station of the Year, Large Market	Radio Station of the Year, Medium/Small Market
CKRY-FM (Calgary, AB); CFCW (Edmonton, AB); CJKX-FM (Oshawa, ON); CKBY-FM (Ottawa, ON); CKKL-FM (Ottawa, ON)	CJXL-FM (Moncton, NB); CFXO-FM (High River, AB); CHCQ-FM (Belleville, ON); CICX-FM (Orillia, ON); CKGY-FM (Red Deer, AB)
Radio Personality of the Year
Shannon Ella (Pure Country); Paul McGuire (Stingray Music); Randy Owen (CJDL-FM); Sarah Scott (CFXO-FM); Wendy Boomer (CKBY-FM)

=== Industry ===
Booking Agency of the Year	Country Music Program or Special of the year
Sakamoto Agency; Invictus Entertainment Group; Paquin Artist Agency; The Feldman Agency; United Talent Agency	Canada Together: In Concert (Corus Entertainment); A Kissel Country Christmas (BAK 2 BAK Entertainment Inc./Stingray); Casey Clarke Country Countdown (Casey Clarke Productions); Girl Power Hour (Rogers Media); The Paul McGuire Show (Stingray)
Country Club of the Year	Music Festival, Fair or Exhibition of the Year
King Eddy (Calgary, AB); Cook County Saloon (Edmonton, AB); Cowboys Roadhouse (Winnipeg, MB); Ranchman’s Cookhouse and Dancehall (Calgary, AB); Rock 'N Horse Saloon (Toronto, ON)	Boots and Hearts Music Festival (Oro-Medonte, ON); Calgary Stampede (Calgary, AB); Cavendish Beach Music Festival (Cavendish, PE); Centerfield Music Festival (St. Paul, AB); Diesel Bird Digital Music Festival (Online)
Management Company of the Year	Music Publishing Company of the Year
Invictus Entertainment Group; Big Loud Management; MDM Artist Management Services; RGK Entertainment Group; Starseed Entertainment	Warner Chappell Music Canada; Anthem Entertainment; Big Loud Publishing; Sony / ATV Music Publishing; Universal Music Publishing Group
Record Company of the Year	Industry Person of the Year
Warner Music Canada; MDM Recordings Inc.; Open Road Recordings; Sony Music Entertainment (Canada) Inc.; Universal Music Canada	Mike Denney (MDM Recordings Inc.); Anya Wilson (Anya Wilson Promotion); Brianne Deslippe (Big Loud Records); Steve Coady (Warner Music Canada); Warren Copnick (Sony Music Entertainment Canada)
Creative Director(s) of the Year	Recording Studio of the Year
Brett Kissel, Connor Scheffler - Brett Kissel, Now Or Never; Bronwin Parks - Gord Bamford, Just Let Go; Ryan Langlois, "It Was a Song"; The Washboard Union, "Country Thunder" and "Dock Rock"; Mitchell Nevins and Madeline Merlo - Emma-Lee ("Kiss Kiss", "If You Never Broke My Heart", "It Didn't"; Madeline Merlo, Digital Marketing; Nick Perreault, James Murdoch, Ben Shillabeer - The Dungarees; Wes Mack, Kyle Bottoms - Wes Mack, Soul	Noble Street Studios (Toronto, ON); Barrytone Studios (Miramichi, NB); Bart McKay Productions (Saskatoon, SK); MCC Recording Studio (Calgary, AB); OCL Studios (Chestermere, AB)
Record Producer of the Year	Retailer of the Year
Scott Moffatt - Luke Combs, What You See Is What You Get; Jacob Durrett, Brett Kissel, Bart McKay - Brett Kissel, Now or Never; Jeff Dalziel - Aaron Allen, Highway Mile; Nice Horse, "Hot Mess"; Dan Davidson, "I Do"; Joey Moi, Dave Cohen - MacKenzie Porter, "These Days"; Karen Kosowski - The Washboard Union, "Country Thunder"	Apple Music; Amazon Music; Spotify Canada
Talent Buyer or Promoter of the Year	Video Director of the Year
Paul Biro (Sakamoto Agency); Adam Oppenheim (Stampede Entertainment Inc.); Jim Cressman (Invictus Entertainment Group)	Ben Knechtel; Emma Higgins; Raphael Mazzucco; Stephano Barberis; Travis Nesbitt
