= Rhinestone World =

2018 song by Dallas Smith

Single by Dallas Smith

from the album Timeless
- Released: November 23, 2018
- Genre: Country rock; country pop
- Length: 3:24
- Label: 604; TTA
- Songwriter(s): Andrew DeRoberts; Josh Osborne; Rodney Clawson
- Producer(s): Joey Moi; Dave Cohen

Dallas Smith singles chronology
| "Make 'Em Like You" (2018) | "Rhinestone World" (2018) | "Drop" (2019) |

Music video
- "Rhinestone World" on YouTube

"Rhinestone World" is a song recorded by Canadian country music singer Dallas Smith. The song was released to radio by 604 Records as the second single from his 2019 EP The Fall, as well as his 2020 album Timeless. It was also sent to American country radio in 2019 by TTA Music.

== Background ==
The song was written by Rodney Clawson, Andrew DeRoberts, and Josh Osborne. The narrator sings of how he was "lost on highway, a little dazed and confused" before finding a girl, singing to her that "loving you is like finding a diamond in a rhinestone world".

== Critical reception ==
Nanci Dagg of Canadian Beats Media stated the track "is a happy song that is full of metaphors and if even one of those metaphors describes the love you feel for someone, this song will resonate with you". Front Porch Music remarked that the track "features the rock influence we love in a country song from Dallas Smith" and "is a tribute to unconditional, romantic love".

== Music video ==
The music video for "Rhinestone World" premiered February 15, 2019.

== Chart performance ==
"Rhinestone World" reached a peak of Number One on the Billboard Canada Country chart dated March 16, 2019. It became Smith's sixth-consecutive Number One hit on the chart, and seventh overall, extending his records for the most by any Canadian country artist.

== Charts ==
| Chart (2019) | Peak position |
|---|---|
| Canada Country (Billboard) | 1 |
