= Timeless (Dallas Smith song) =

2019 song by Dallas Smith

Single by Dallas Smith

from the album Timeless
- Released: October 15, 2019
- Genre: Country pop
- Length: 2:49
- Label: 604
- Songwriter(s): Brett Eldredge; David Garcia; Josh Miller; Tyler Hubbard
- Producer(s): Joey Moi; Dave Cohen

Dallas Smith singles chronology
"Drop" (2019)	"Timeless" (2019)	"Like a Man" (2020)

Music video
- "Timeless" on YouTube

"Timeless" is a song recorded by Canadian country music singer Dallas Smith. It was written by Tyler Hubbard, Brett Eldredge, Josh Miller, and David Garcia. The song was released to radio by 604 Records as the fourth single from his 2019 EP The Fall, and as well as his 2020 album Timeless.

== Background ==
The track was written by country singers Tyler Hubbard of Florida Georgia Line and Brett Eldredge, along with David Garcia and Josh Miller. Smith told Parton and Pearl: "There are some pretty big named writers on that song. You build up a little bit of trust with those guys and the production team we got. They are not going to give those songs away if they think that you're going to mess it up. That was one of those ones that just came along and was sent to us and that just fit with what we're doing so well. It was one of those 'no-brainer' ones where you just look up to the heavens and go, 'Man, I can't believe I'm in a position where I get to sing a song like that".

== Music video ==
An accompanying music video was directed by Stephano Barberis and premiered January 9, 2020. The video was filmed in black and white.

== Chart performance ==
"Timeless" reached a peak of Number One on the Billboard Canada Country chart dated February 29, 2020. It marks Smith's ninth Number One hit on the chart, a record for a Canadian country artist. It also peaked at number 93 on the Billboard Canadian Hot 100.

== Charts ==
Chart (2020)	Peak position
Canada (Canadian Hot 100)	93
Canada Country (Billboard)	1

== Certifications ==
Region	Certification	Certified units/sales
Canada (Music Canada)	Gold	40,000^{‡}
^{‡} Sales+streaming figures based on certification alone.
