= The Josh Ramsay Show =

Studio album by Josh Ramsay
- Released: April 8, 2022
- Studios: The Warehouse Studio (Vancouver, British Columbia)
- Genre: Pop
- Length: 61:30
- Label: 604
- Producer: Josh Ramsay

Singles from The Josh Ramsay Show
- 1. "Lady Mine" Released: December 3, 2021; 2. "Best of Me" Released: February 15, 2022; 3. "Can't Give It Up" Released: April 8, 2022; 4. "Perfect Mistake" Released: July 6, 2023

The Josh Ramsay Show is the debut studio album by Canadian singer-songwriter and musician Josh Ramsay. It was released on April 8, 2022, through 604 Records. It was preceded by two singles in support of the album, "Lady Mine" and "Best of Me".

== Background ==
On November 8, 2021, Josh Ramsay announced his debut studio album, The Josh Ramsay Show with a release date for 2022. The album features collaborations from Chad Kroeger, Fefe Dobson, Serena Ryder, Fionn, Tyler Shaw, Dallas Smith, Ria Mae, Sara Ramsay and DJ Sharkpocalypse.

Ramsay wrote the album during the COVID-19 pandemic, recalling, "I basically locked myself away for a year and went crazy on every tangent I could come up with. I always wanted to make an album where I played every instrument. The pandemic was the right opportunity to finally do it." During that time, he experienced the pain of losing both his parents, as well as getting married. Wanting to avoid creating a "sad-sack album," he focused on writing upbeat and uplifting songs as he didn't want the album to "feel like grief." He called the album "a collection of short stories" due to the different genres of sound. Ramsay also described it as "love letter to music" and that the album's title reads "sort of like a variety show." Its artwork was designed by Ramsay along with Garnet Armstrong and is a tribute to Ramsay's family, drawing inspiration from when his parents met at a variety show.

== Composition and recording ==
Recorded at The Warehouse Studio in Vancouver, it was produced and mixed by Ramsay, who also played all instruments on album. It was also co-mixed by Dave Ogilvie and assisted by Zack Blackstone. Mixing was completed by July 2021. Musically, Ramsay wanted to "avoid" having the record "sound like a Marianas Trench album" and instead, experimenting with different genres. A cohesive piece of work, Ramsay said that sections of the album "feel like film scores," featuring certain tracks centered around composition and no vocals. He explained this decision by stating, "they serve as act breaks on the album. They also transition the mood." The album's lead track "Lady Mine", features a more rock leaning sound and was the first song written for the album. The second track "Blame It on the Beat" features a horn section. The third track "Best of Me" had already been written when Ramsay reached out to Dallas Smith to be featured on the track and is described as a midtempo country song. The seventeenth track "Can't Give It Up" is described as adult contemporary. Ramsay originally wanted Bryan Adams featured on the song, who thought his voice would fit the track, however he was busy recording his own album at the time. Also wanting to work with Tyler Shaw, he decided to send him the song instead. The eighth track "Spellbound" is dedicated to his mother, Corlynn, which Ramsay described as a "pop song in the spirit of 'All You Need Is Love' or 'Eleanor Rigby'." The final track "Miles and Miles", is a tribute to his father, Miles and features vocals from his sister, Sara. According to Ramsay, the song was put together in nearly two months, also featuring a 160-piece orchestra, which was recorded over several days and spent another two weeks editing the track. He also added that the arrangement of the song was "to honor his father who taught him to arrange music." Other genres included the '80s funk "Beat the Devil" and contemporary R&B "Delirious". The former features Serena Ryder, which Ramsay revealed that the two improvised with each other on the last chorus of the song.

== Release ==
On December 3, 2021, "Lady Mine" was released as the album's lead single, featuring Chad Kroeger of Nickelback. The second single from the album was released on February 15, 2022, titled "Best of Me", featuring Dallas Smith. Two weeks ahead of the album's release, Ramsay released "Spellbound" for streaming as a promotional single. On the day of the album's release, the third single titled "Can't Give It Up" featuring Tyler Shaw, was released. "Perfect Mistake", featuring Ria Mae was released on July 6, 2023, as the album's fourth and final single. Ramsay embarked on a supporting tour across Canada during the spring of 2022.

== Critical reception ==
Roog Kubur of The Gauntlet wrote a positive review for the album stating, "The record is a cinematic masterpiece, making use of Ramsay’s incredible range and musical prowess [...] What makes the album so enticing is that the sonic whiplash is still fun. Each track sounds like a different part of Ramsay, which is what makes it so engaging."

== Track listing ==
All tracks are written by Josh Ramsay.

The Josh Ramsay Show track listing
No.	Title	Length
1.	"Lady Mine" (featuring Chad Kroeger)	4:02
2.	"Blame It On the Beat"	3:19
3.	"Best of Me" (featuring Dallas Smith)	4:00
4.	"Army of One"	1:21
5.	"You & I" (featuring Fionn)	3:17
6.	"Delirious" (featuring Fefe Dobson)	3:59
7.	"Painted Faces"	3:45
8.	"Spellbound"	3:37
9.	"Try Me"	3:53
10.	"The Ballad of Cheeky Valentino"	1:45
11.	"Beat the Devil" (featuring Serena Ryder)	4:08
12.	"Like You Do"	4:05
13.	"Perfect Mistake" (featuring Ria Mae)	3:29
14.	"The Deep Woods"	1:05
15.	"Reckless Heart"	3:46
16.	"Like There's Nobody Watching" (featuring DJ Sharkpocalypse)	3:40
17.	"Can't Give It Up" (featuring Tyler Shaw)	3:28
18.	"Miles and Miles" (featuring Sara Ramsay)	4:33
Total length:		61:30

== Release history ==
Release dates and formats for The Josh Ramsay Show
Region	Date	Format	Label	Ref.
Various	April 8, 2022	Digital download	604	
Canada	April 8, 2022	CD	604	
Canada	June 3, 2022	Vinyl	604	
