= One Drink Ago =

Single by Dallas Smith and Terri Clark
- Released: March 28, 2018
- Genre: Country
- Length: 3:20
- Label: 604; Bare Track
- Songwriters: Jessi Alexander; Rodney Clawson; Ross Copperman
- Producer: Joey Moi

Dallas Smith singles chronology
"Sleepin' Around" (2017)	"One Drink Ago" (2018)	"Make 'Em Like You" (2018)

Terri Clark singles chronology
"I Cheated on You" (2015)	"One Drink Ago" (2018)	"Young as We Are Tonight" (2018)

"One Drink Ago" is a song written by Jessi Alexander, Rodney Clawson, and Ross Copperman, and recorded as a duet between Canadian country artists Dallas Smith and Terri Clark. It was released to Canadian country radio through 604 Records on March 28, 2018 and was released to digital retailers on March 30, 2018. "One Drink Ago" was intended as the lead single for Clark's forthcoming eleventh studio album, but was left off the track listing when Raising the Bar was released. The song has become Smith's record-extending eighteenth consecutive top ten country hit.

== Content ==
"One Drink Ago" describes a night out on the town and how alcohol can draw people together. The song is a duet which blends Smith's rock-oriented vocal with Clark's more traditional country style.

== Commercial performance ==
"One Drink Ago" debuted at number 36 on the Billboard Canada Country chart dated April 14, 2018. The song entered the top ten, at number 9, on the chart dated June 9, 2018; this earned Clark her fourteenth top ten country hit in Canada (her first since 2011), and Smith his record-extending eighteenth consecutive top ten hit. It has since reached a peak position of 3 on the chart dated June 30, 2018.

== Live performances ==
Clark invited Smith to debut the song at the Grand Ole Opry, of which Clark is the only female Canadian member, on April 10, 2018.

Smith and Clark performed the song at the 2018 Canadian Country Music Association Awards, on a night where Clark was being inducted into the Canadian Country Music Hall of Fame.

== Charts ==
Chart (2018)	Peak position
Canada Country (Billboard)	3

== Release history ==
Country	Date	Format	Label	Ref.
Canada	March 28, 2018	Country radio	604	
Canada	March 30, 2018	Digital download	604; Bare Track	
