= Timeless (Dallas Smith album) =

Studio album by Dallas Smith
- Released: August 28, 2020
- Recorded: 2018–2020
- Genre: Country
- Length: 38:11
- Label: 604; Fontana North
- Producer: Joey Moi (all tracks); Dave Cohen (tracks 1–3, 6, 8–9, 11); David Garcia (track 5)

Dallas Smith chronology
The Fall (2019)	Timeless (2020)	Dallas Smith (2023)

Singles from Timeless
- 1. "Make 'Em Like You" Released: July 20, 2018; 2. "Rhinestone World" Released: November 23, 2018; 3. "Drop" Released: May 1, 2019; 4. "Timeless" Released: October 15, 2019; 5. "Like a Man" Released: April 1, 2020; 6. "Some Things Never Change" Released: September 24, 2020

Timeless is the fourth solo studio album by Canadian country singer Dallas Smith, and was released through 604 Records on August 28, 2020.

== Background ==
Smith told Parton and Pearl after releasing The Fall, "I honestly just looked at that chunk of music as something individually". He then began to work on a second EP when he "got a sense of the record taking shape". Smith said "As far as a record and listening to it front to back I knew what was missing and how I wanted this chapter to be represented".

While Smith recorded the vocals of the previously released tracks in Nashville, Tennessee with longtime producer Joey Moi, restrictions due to the COVID-19 pandemic forced Smith to record vocals for the rest of the album at his home in Langley, British Columbia. Smith said he hoped to release "timeless country music" in "uncertain times".

== Content ==
The album contains twelve songs in total and includes all six songs from his previously released, Juno Award-nominated extended play, The Fall. Five singles: "Make 'Em Like You", "Rhinestone World", "Drop", "Timeless", and "Like a Man" were released prior to the album and each one reached number one on the Billboard Canada Country chart, breaking a record that Smith previously set for most number ones on a Canadian country album with his third album, Side Effects. The album features collaborations with fellow Canadian country artists Dean Brody and MacKenzie Porter as well as American country rock artist Hardy. The latter collaboration, "Some Things Never Change" was sent to country radio as the sixth single off the album, and would extend Smith's record to six number one singles from the same album.

== Track listing ==
Timeless track listing
No.	Title	Writer(s)	Length
1.	"Drop"	Joey Moi; Mark Holman; Michael Hardy; Steven Lee Olsen	3:23
2.	"Timeless"	Brett Eldredge; David Garcia; Josh Miller; Tyler Hubbard	2:49
3.	"Some Things Never Change" (featuring Hardy)	Hardy; Rodney Clawson; Corey Crowder; Jordan Schmidt	2:51
4.	"Don't Need the Whiskey"	Rhett Akins; Matt Dragstrem; Thomas Rhett; Josh Thompson; Laura Veltz	2:55
5.	"Like a Man"	Garcia; Miller; Jessi Alexander	3:08
6.	"Damn Sun"	Cary Barlowe; Jamie Moore; Derrick Southerland	3:34
7.	"Make 'Em Like You"	Hubbard; Brian Kelley; Cameron Montgomery; Randy Houser; Rob Hatch	3:05
8.	"Rhinestone World"	Clawson; Andrew DeRoberts; Josh Osborne	3:24
9.	"The Fall"	Jeff Hyde; Morgan Wallen; Ryan Tyndell	3:42
10.	"Bars"	Dragstrem; Josh Kear; Chris Tompkins	3:06
11.	"Friends Don't Let Friends Drink Alone" (featuring Dean Brody and MacKenzie Porter)	Thompson; Dragstrem; Clawson	3:08
12.	"People I've Known"	Dragstrem; Luke Laird	3:06
Total length:			38:11

== Personnel ==
Adapted from the CD booklet.

- Steve Marc Antonio – recording
- Case Arnold – background vocals
- Jeff Balding – recording
- Dean Brody – featured vocals on "Friends Don't Let Friends Drink Alone"
- Tyler Chiarelli – electric guitar
- Dave Cohen – production, keys, programming
- Scott Cooke – editing
- Kris Donegan – electric guitar
- Matt Dragstrem – programming
- Paul Franklin – steel guitar
- David Garcia – production, programming
- Ally Gecewitz – studio assistance, editing
- Hardy – featured vocals on "Some Things Never Change", background vocals
- Wes Hightower – background vocals
- Mark Hill – bass guitar
- Mark Holman – programming
- Chris Hornbuckle – photography
- Annette Kirk – art design
- Tori Johnson – art direction
- Joey Moi – production, background vocals, programming
- Andrew Mendelson – mastering
- Luke Mosley – keys
- Eivind Norland – editing, mixing
- Justin Ostrander – electric guitar
- MacKenzie Porter – featured vocals on "Friends Don't Let Friends Drink Alone"
- Jerry Roe – drums, percussion
- Justin Schipper – banjo, dobro, steel guitar
- Adam Shoenfeld – electric guitar
- Jimmie Lee Sloas – bass guitar
- Dallas Smith – lead vocals, background vocals
- Ilya Toshinsky – acoustic guitar, banjo, mandolin, resonator guitar
- Derek Wells – electric guitar
- Nir Z – drums, percussion

== Chart performance ==
=== Album ===
Chart performance for Timeless
Chart (2020)	Peak position
Canadian Albums (Billboard)	58

=== Singles ===
Year	Title	Peak chart positions		Certifications
Year	Title	CAN Country	CAN	Certifications
2018	"Make 'Em Like You"	1	—	
2018	"Rhinestone World"	1	—	
2019	"Drop"	1	77	MC: Platinum
2019	"Timeless"	1	93	MC: Gold
2020	"Like a Man"	1	60	MC: Platinum
2020	"Some Things Never Change" (featuring Hardy)	1	55	MC: Gold

== Certifications ==
Region	Certification	Certified units/sales
Canada (Music Canada)	Gold	40,000^{‡}
^{‡} Sales+streaming figures based on certification alone.

== Awards and nominations ==
Year	Association	Category	Nominated work	Result	Ref.
2020	Canadian Country Music Awards	Single of the Year	"Drop"	Nominated	
2021	Juno Awards of 2021	Country Album of the Year	Timeless	Nominated	
2021	Canadian Country Music Awards	Album of the Year	Timeless	Nominated	
2021	Canadian Country Music Awards	Single of the Year	"Like a Man"	Won	

== Release history ==
Release formats for Timeless
Country	Date	Format	Label	Ref.
Various	August 28, 2020	Digital download	604	
Various	August 28, 2020	Streaming	604	
Various	August 28, 2020	CD	604; Fontana North	
Various	December 18, 2020	Vinyl	604; Fontana North	
