= Some Things Never Change (Dallas Smith song) =

2020 song by Dallas Smith

Single by Dallas Smith featuring Hardy

from the album Timeless
- Released: September 24, 2020
- Genre: Country; country rock
- Length: 2:51
- Label: 604
- Songwriters: Michael Hardy; Corey Crowder; Jordan Schmidt; Rodney Clawson
- Producers: Joey Moi; Dave Cohen

Dallas Smith singles chronology
| "Like a Man" (2020) | "Some Things Never Change" (2020) | "Hide from a Broken Heart" (2021) |

Hardy singles chronology
| "One Beer" (2020) | "Some Things Never Change" (2020) | "Give Heaven Some Hell" (2021) |

Music video
- "Some Things Never Change" on YouTube

"Some Things Never Change" is a song recorded by Canadian country music singer Dallas Smith. It features American country singer Hardy, who co-wrote the track along with Rodney Clawson, Corey Crowder, and Jordan Schmidt. The song was released to radio by 604 Records as the sixth single from Smith's 2020 album Timeless.

== Background ==
Smith remarked that while he was in the studio in Nashville, fellow Joey Moi-collaborators Florida Georgia Line were working on an album that Hardy had 11 co-writes on. Smith then stated "I watched him emerge as an artist. I cut a few songs of his in the past but getting a sneak peek at what he was doing as an artist, a lot of his rock-influenced in-your-face country music resonated with me because it’s kind of my jam. I love that stuff and he and I just kind of clicked". Smith also said the track "is a song [Hardy] had kicking around and I tried the verses a little bit, but Michael wrote those parts and they needed the twang that only he can do".

== Commercial performance ==
"Some Things Never Change" reached a peak of number one on the Billboard Canada Country chart dated February 6, 2021, marking Smith's sixth consecutive number one and eleventh overall. It peaked at number 55 on the Canadian Hot 100 in the same week, his third-highest entry there behind "Tippin' Point" and "Wastin' Gas". It also peaked at number 36 on the Billboard Hot Canadian Digital Singles chart in the week after the release of Smith's album, prior to the track becoming a single. The song has been certified Gold by Music Canada.

== Music video ==
The music video for "Some Things Never Change" was directed by Stephano Barberis and premiered January 26, 2021. The video features both Smith and Hardy.

== Charts ==
| Chart (2020–2021) | Peak position |
|---|---|
| Australia Country Hot 50 (TMN) | 48 |
| Canada Country (Billboard) | 1 |
| Canada (Canadian Hot 100) | 55 |

== Certifications ==
| Region | Certification | Certified units/sales |
|---|---|---|
| Canada (Music Canada) | Gold | 40,000^{‡} |
^{‡} Sales+streaming figures based on certification alone.
