= Like a Man (Dallas Smith song) =

2020 single by Dallas Smith

Single by Dallas Smith

from the album Timeless
- Released: April 1, 2020
- Genre: Country pop
- Length: 3:08
- Label: 604
- Songwriters: David Garcia; Jessi Alexander; Josh Miller
- Producers: Joey Moi; David Garcia

Dallas Smith singles chronology
"Timeless" (2019)	"Like a Man" (2020)	"Some Things Never Change" (2020)

Lyric Video
- "Like a Man" on YouTube

"Like a Man" is a song recorded by Canadian country music singer Dallas Smith and released as the fifth single from his 2020 album Timeless. The song was written by David Garcia, Jessi Alexander, and Josh Miller, while Garcia produced the track with Joey Moi. It was named "Single of the Year" at the 2021 Canadian Country Music Awards.

== Background ==
Like a Man was released amidst the coronavirus pandemic and Smith remarked that he hoped the track would give listeners "a 3 minute escape from the craziness we’re living in".

== Accolades ==
Year	Association	Category	Nominated work	Result	Ref.
2021	Canadian Country Music Awards	Single of the Year	"Like a Man"	Won	

== Commercial performance ==
"Like a Man" reached a peak of Number One on the Billboard Canada Country chart dated August 22, 2020. It became Smith's ninth-consecutive Number One hit on the chart, and tenth overall, extending both records Smith holds for a Canadian country artist. It also peaked at number 60 on the Billboard Canadian Hot 100, marking Smith's highest charting entry there since "Wastin' Gas" in 2014. It has been certified Platinum by Music Canada.

== Charts ==
Chart (2020)	Peak position
Australia Country Hot 50 (TMN)	43
Canada (Canadian Hot 100)	60
Canada Country (Billboard)	1

== Certifications ==
Region	Certification	Certified units/sales
Canada (Music Canada)	Platinum	80,000^{‡}
^{‡} Sales+streaming figures based on certification alone.
