= The Fall (EP) =

EP by Dallas Smith
- Released: March 15, 2019
- Genre: Country; country pop
- Length: 19:31
- Label: 604; Fontana North
- Producer: Joey Moi; Dave Cohen

Dallas Smith chronology
Acoustic Sessions Vol. 1 (2018)	The Fall (2019)	Timeless (2020)

Singles from The Fall
- 1. "Make 'Em Like You" Released: July 20, 2018; 2. "Rhinestone World" Released: November 23, 2018; 3. "Drop" Released: May 1, 2019; 4. "Timeless" Released: October 15, 2019

The Fall is the third extended play by Canadian country music artist Dallas Smith. It was released in Canada on March 15, 2019 via 604 Records and Fontana North. The EP was nominated for Album of the Year at the 2019 CCMA Awards as well as Country Album of the Year at the 2020 Juno Awards.

All four singles released from the project reached number one on Billboard's Canada Country chart: extending Smith's record-holding number of number one hits on the chart among Canadian artists all-time to nine.

== Content ==
The EP was noted to have more of a country pop approach than Smith's previous music. Fellow country singers Tyler Hubbard and Brian Kelley of Florida Georgia Line, Morgan Wallen, Hardy, Steven Lee Olsen, Randy Houser and Brett Eldredge were among the songwriters. "Make 'Em Like You" and "Rhinestone World" were previously released as singles and became Smith's sixth and seventh Canadian country number ones. "Friends Don't Let Friends Drink Alone" featured fellow Canadian country singers Dean Brody and MacKenzie Porter. The trio performed the song together on the similarly named "Friends Don't Let Friends Tour Alone Tour" which Smith and Brody co-headlined in late 2019.

== Track listing ==
No.	Title	Writer(s)	Length
1.	"Drop"	Joey Moi; Mark Holman; Michael Hardy; Steven Lee Olsen	3:23
2.	"Timeless"	Brett Eldredge; David Garcia; Josh Miller; Tyler Hubbard	2:49
3.	"Rhinestone World"	Andrew DeRoberts; Josh Osborne; Rodney Clawson	3:24
4.	"The Fall"	Jeff Hyde; Morgan Wallen; Ryan Tyndell	3:42
5.	"Friends Don't Let Friends Drink Alone" (featuring Dean Brody and MacKenzie Porter)	Josh Thompson; Matt Dragstem; Clawson	3:08
6.	"Make 'Em Like You"	Brian Kelley; Cameron Montgomery; Randy Houser; Rob Hatch; Hubbard	3:05
Total length:			19:31

== Chart performance ==
=== EP ===
Chart (2019)	Peak position
Canadian Albums (Billboard)	91

=== Singles ===
Year	Single	Peak chart positions		Certifications
Year	Single	CAN Country	CAN	Certifications
2018	"Make 'Em Like You"	1	—	
2018	"Rhinestone World"	1	—	
2019	"Drop"	1	77	MC: Gold
2019	"Timeless"	1	93	MC: Gold

== Awards and nominations ==
Year	Association	Category	Nominated work	Result	Ref.
2019	Canadian Country Music Awards	Album of the Year	The Fall	Nominated	
2020	Juno Awards	Country Album of the Year	The Fall	Nominated	

== Release history ==
Release formats for The Fall
Country	Date	Format	Label	Ref.
Various	March 15, 2019	Digital download	604	
Various	March 15, 2019	Streaming	604	
Various	March 22, 2019	CD	604; Fontana North	
