= Theory of a Deadman (album) =

Studio album by Theory of a Deadman
- Released: September 17, 2002
- Recorded: November 2001 – May 2002
- Studio: Greenhouse
- Genre: Hard rock, post-grunge, alternative rock
- Length: 36:38
- Label: 604
- Producer: Chad Kroeger; Joey Moi

Theory of a Deadman chronology
Theory of a Deadman (2002)	Gasoline (2005)

Singles from Theory of a Deadman
- 1. "Nothing Could Come Between Us" Released: July 22, 2002; 2. "Make Up Your Mind" Released: January 13, 2003; 3. "Point to Prove" Released: 2003; 4. "The Last Song" Released: February 18, 2003

Professional ratings
Review scores
Source	Rating
Allmusic	3/5 stars
Rolling Stone	2/5 stars

Theory of a Deadman is the debut studio album by the Canadian rock band Theory of a Deadman. The album was released on September 17, 2002 through 604 Records.

== Album information ==
The album contained the hit single "Make Up Your Mind". It also featured the singles "Nothing Could Come Between Us", "Point to Prove" and "The Last Song," (which was originally called "Theory of a Deadman"), both of which were solely written by Tyler Connolly, the band's lead singer. The album bears a Parental Advisory label due to expletives in "Invisible Man", "Any Other Way", and "Confession". A clean version was released that removed the expletives. The track ‘Invisible Man’ was also featured on the 2002 Spider-Man film soundtrack.

The album received mixed reviews from critics but sold very well. It would later certified Platinum in Canada as well as charting at number 85 on the US Rock Albums chart.

== Track listing ==
All lyrics are written by Tyler Connolly and Chad Kroeger; all music is composed by Theory of a Deadman.

No.	Title	Length
1.	"Invisible Man"	2:41
2.	"Nothing Could Come Between Us"	3:24
3.	"Make Up Your Mind"	4:02
4.	"Point to Prove"	3:38
5.	"Leg to Stand On"	3:26
6.	"What You Deserve"	4:00
7.	"The Last Song"	4:27
8.	"Say I'm Sorry"	3:15
9.	"Any Other Way"	3:47
10.	"Confession"	3:57
Total length:		36:38

=== 2009 special edition ===
No.	Title	Length
11.	"Above This"	2:16
12.	"Inside"	3:08
13.	"Midnight Rider" (Allman Brothers Band cover)	3:09

== Personnel ==
Personnel taken from Theory of a Deadman CD booklet.

Theory of a Deadman

- Tyler Connolly – lead vocals, guitar
- Dave Brenner – guitar
- Dean Back – bass
- Tim Hart – drums, backing vocals

Additional musicians

- Robin Diaz – drums
- Danny Craig – drums
- Brian Larson – violin
- Rebecca Whitling – violin
- Joshua Greenlaw – viola
- Charles Inkman – cello

Production

- Chad Kroeger – producer
- Joey Moi – producer, engineer
- Latif Tayour – second engineer
- Ryan Andersen – digital engineer
- Randy Staub – mixing
- Zach Blackstone – mix assistant
- George Marino – mastering

Design

- Daniel Moss – photography
- Scott Sandler – package design
- Lynda Kusnetz – creative director

== Year-end charts ==
Year-end chart performance for Theory of a Deadman
Chart (2002)	Position
Canadian Albums (Nielsen SoundScan)	134
Canadian Alternative Albums (Nielsen SoundScan)	42
Canadian Metal Albums (Nielsen SoundScan)	21

== Single Charts ==
Single	Peak chart positions					
Single	CAN	CAN Alt	US Main	US Alt	US Adult	BEL
"Nothing Could Come Between Us"	2	—	8	—	—	—
"Make Up Your Mind"	13	—	13	38	36	41
"Point to Prove"	—	—	—	—	—	—
"The Last Song"	—	—	—	—	—	—
"Leg To Stand On"	—	89	—	—	—	—
