= Make Up Your Mind =

2003 single by Theory of a Deadman

Single by Theory of a Deadman

from the album Theory of a Deadman
- B-side: "Midnight Rider"
- Released: January 13, 2003
- Length: 4:02
- Label: 604
- Songwriters: Tyler Connolly; Chad Kroeger
- Producers: Chad Kroeger; Joey Moi

Theory of a Deadman singles chronology
| "Nothing Could Come Between Us" (2002) | "Make Up Your Mind" (2003) | "Point to Prove" (2003) |

Music video
- "Make Up Your Mind" on YouTube

"Make Up Your Mind" is a song by Canadian rock group Theory of a Deadman and is the second single from their eponymous debut album (2002). Released on January 13, 2003, the song's lyrics were written by the band's lead guitarist and singer Tyler Connolly and Nickelback frontman Chad Kroeger. Kroeger also produced the track along with Joey Moi. It peaked at number 13 on the Canadian Singles chart as well as the Billboard Mainstream Rock Tracks chart.

== Background and development ==
"Make Up Your Mind" is a ballad written by lead guitarist and singer Tyler Connolly and Chad Kroeger. Kroeger also produced the track along with Joey Moi.

== Release and commercial performance ==
The song was released in February 2003, as the second single off the band's debut studio album, Theory of a Deadman (2002). It peaked at number 13 on the Canadian Singles chart. In the United States, it reached numbers 36, 38, and 13 on Billboard's Adult Top 40, Modern Rock Tracks, and Mainstream Rock Tracks charts, respectively. The single also made an appearance on Belgium's Ultratop 50 Singles chart.

== Music video ==
The music video for "Make Up Your Mind" was directed by Gregory Dark and revolves around the dream a woman has of her wedding day, which involves her walking down the aisle as she kisses and touches random guests at an outdoor ceremony. The dream ends when she leaps off a cliff. The band is seen performing on rocky terrain throughout the video.

== Track listings ==
Canadian CD single

1. "Make Up Your Mind" (radio mix) – 3:48
2. "Make Up Your Mind" (acoustic mix) – 3:48
3. "Make Up Your Mind" (alternate mix) – 3:48

Australian CD single

1. "Make Up Your Mind" (album edit) – 3:56
2. "Make Up Your Mind" (radio mix) – 3:34
3. "Midnight Rider" – 3:17
4. "Make Up Your Mind" (video)

European CD single

1. "Make Up Your Mind" (radio mix) – 3:34
2. "Midnight Rider" – 3:17

European maxi-CD single

1. "Make Up Your Mind" (radio mix) – 3:34
2. "Make Up Your Mind" (album edit) – 3:56
3. "Midnight Rider" – 3:17
4. "Make Up Your Mind" (video)

== Personnel ==
Personnel are lifted from the US promo CD liner notes.

Theory of a Deadman

- Tyler Connolly – lead vocals, guitar, writing
- Tim Hart – drums, background vocals
- Dean Back – bass
- David Brenner – guitar

Others

- Chad Kroeger – writing, production
- Joey Moi – production
- Randy Staub – mixing

== Charts ==
| Chart (2003) | Peak position |
|---|---|
| Belgium (Ultratop 50 Flanders) | 41 |
| Canada (Nielsen SoundScan) | 13 |
| US Adult Top 40 (Billboard) | 36 |
| US Mainstream Rock Tracks (Billboard) | 13 |
| US Modern Rock Tracks (Billboard) | 38 |

== Release history ==
| Region | Date | Format(s) | Label(s) | Ref. |
|---|---|---|---|---|
| United States | January 13, 2003 | Mainstream rock; active rock; alternative radio | Roadrunner | |
| United States | March 3, 2003 | Contemporary hit; hot adult contemporary radio | Roadrunner | |
| Australia | May 12, 2003 | CD | Roadrunner | |
