= Fill in the Blank =

Fill In the Blank may refer to:

- Cloze test, a language test in which blank spaces in the text must be filled in
- "Fill in the Blank", a 2013 single by Greg Bates
- "Fill in the Blank", a single by Car Seat Headrest from their 2016 album Teens of Denial
- "Fill in the Blanks", a song by Ringo Starr from his 2010 album Y Not

== See also ==
- Fill in the Bank, a Philippine game show broadcast on TV5
