= Tailgate to Heaven =

2021 song by Shawn Austin

Single by Shawn Austin featuring Chris Lane

from the EP Planes Don't Wait
- Released: August 11, 2021
- Genre: Country
- Length: 3:05
- Label: Local Hay; Big Loud
- Songwriters: Kelly Archer; Rodney Clawson; Will Bundy
- Producers: Scott Cooke; Will Bundy

Shawn Austin singles chronology
"The Little Things" (2020)	"Tailgate to Heaven" (2021)	"Get You" (2022)

Chris Lane singles chronology
"Fill Them Boots" (2021)	"Tailgate to Heaven" (2021)	"Find Another Bar" (2023)

Music video
- "Tailgate to Heaven" on YouTube

"Tailgate to Heaven" is a song by Canadian country artist Shawn Austin featuring American country artist Chris Lane. The song was written by Kelly Archer, Rodney Clawson, and Will Bundy, while Bundy produced the track with Scott Cooke. It marked the debut release from Local Hay Records, a joint venture between Big Loud, Dallas Smith, and their partners.

== Background ==
Austin and Lane were initially going to do a different song together, but once Lane heard "Tailgate to Heaven", he wanted to be a part of it and Austin said yes "without hesitation". He remarked that he was "humbled" to have Lane on the track.

== Critical reception ==
Nanci Dagg of Canadian Beats Media called the song a "beautiful ballad". Jenna Weishar of Front Porch Music stated the song had a "rock-country flare", noting Austin's "smooth vocals" and adding that Chris Lane was a "perfect match for the duet" as their voices "elevate each other". Will Chernoff of Rhythm Changes said "Tailgate to Heaven" was "more interesting" than Austin's previous radio singles.

== Accolades ==
Year	Association	Category	Result	Ref
2022	CCMA	Single Of The Year	Nominated	

== Commercial performance ==
"Tailgate to Heaven" reached a peak of number five on the Billboard Canada Country chart, surpassing Austin's previous career high of seven set by "What Do I Know" in 2019. It also peaked at number 61 on the Canadian Hot 100, becoming Austin's first career entry on his national all-genre chart and Lane's career highest charting entry there as well. The song has been certified Gold by Music Canada.

== Music video ==
The official music video for "Tailgate to Heaven" features both Austin and Lane and premiered on November 4, 2021. It was filmed in Tennessee and directed by Justin Clough.

== Charts ==
Chart performance for "Tailgate to Heaven"
Chart (2021–2022)	Peak position
Canada Hot 100 (Billboard)	61
Canada Country (Billboard)	5

== Certifications ==
Certifications for "Tailgate to Heaven"
Region	Certification	Certified units/sales
Canada (Music Canada)	Gold	40,000^{‡}
^{‡} Sales+streaming figures based on certification alone.
