= Best of Me (Josh Ramsay song) =

2022 song by Josh Ramsay

Single by Josh Ramsay featuring Dallas Smith

from the album The Josh Ramsay Show
- Released: February 15, 2022
- Genre: Country rock
- Length: 4:00
- Label: 604
- Songwriter(s): Josh Ramsay
- Producer(s): Josh Ramsay

Josh Ramsay singles chronology
"Lady Mine" (2021)	"Best of Me" (2022)	"Can't Give It Up" (2022)

Dallas Smith singles chronology
"Hide from a Broken Heart" (2021)	"Best of Me" (2022)	"One Too" (2022)

Music video
- "Best of Me" on YouTube

"Best of Me" is a song written, produced, and recorded by Canadian singer and musician Josh Ramsay featuring Canadian country artist Dallas Smith. It is the second single off Ramsay's debut solo album The Josh Ramsay Show.

== Background ==
Ramsay's album The Josh Ramsay Show is eighteen-track album with every song intended to be of a different genre of music. Seeking to write a country song, Ramsay stated that he wrote "Best of Me" with Dallas Smith's voice in mind. Ramsay noted real-life inspiration in writing the song, saying: "Before we got married, there was a time when my wife and I were split up. I felt like I couldn't successfully be with anyone else because the best parts of me were still wrapped up in her. This proved to be very true for both of us - and we got back together and got married in the end." He noted the biggest challenge in recording the song was that he did not feel like he sounded like a country singer, saying "I went back and did it over and over, trying to get it to a place that felt country but still felt authentically like me".

== Critical reception ==
Nanci Dagg of Canadian Beats Media described the song as "a storytelling-style country track that paints the picture of heartbreak, forgiveness, and warfare in love," adding that the "lyrical story takes listeners through powerful truths, accompanied by tempo-building rhythm". FindYourSounds stated that "Best of Me", "at its heart, [is] really about having hope that your hesitancy about not being able to move on from your relationship might mean that there could be some unresolved feelings there. Matthew Patania of Pulse Music Magazine said the track "is as drenched in sorrow as it is redemption," saying it conveys the thought that "No matter what we want to believe, feelings that come back, are feelings that never left".

== Music video ==
The official music video for "Best of Me" premiered on YouTube on February 18, 2022, and was directed by Stephano Barberis. Ramsay and Smith also recorded a live acoustic version of the song that premiered as a video on March 8, 2022.

== Track listings ==
Digital download - single

1. "Best of Me" – 4:00
  (feat. Dallas Smith)

Digital download - single

1. "Best of Me" – 3:57
  (feat. Dallas Smith) [Live Acoustic]
