= Drop (Dallas Smith song) =

Single by Dallas Smith

from the album Timeless
- Released: May 1, 2019
- Genre: Country pop; alternative rock
- Length: 3:23
- Label: 604
- Songwriter(s): Joey Moi; Mark Holman; Michael Hardy; Steven Lee Olsen
- Producer(s): Joey Moi; Dave Cohen

Dallas Smith singles chronology
"Rhinestone World" (2018)	"Drop" (2019)	"Timeless" (2019)

Music video
- "Drop" on YouTube

"Drop" is a song recorded by Canadian country music singer Dallas Smith. It was written by Joey Moi, Mark Holman, Michael Hardy, Steven Lee Olsen. The song was released to radio by 604 Records as the third single from his 2019 EP The Fall, and was later included on his 2020 album Timeless.

== Chart performance ==
"Drop" reached a peak of Number One on the Billboard Canada Country chart dated September 7, 2019. It marks the singer's eighth Number One hit on the chart, the most by any Canadian country artist. It also peaked at number 77 on the Billboard Canadian Hot 100, his first single to chart there since "Autograph" in 2016.

== Charts ==
Chart (2019)	Peak position
Canada (Canadian Hot 100)	77
Canada Country (Billboard)	1

== Certifications ==
Region	Certification	Certified units/sales
Canada (Music Canada)	Platinum	80,000^{‡}
^{‡} Sales+streaming figures based on certification alone.
