= Make 'Em Like You =

2018 song by Dallas Smith

Single by Dallas Smith

from the album Timeless
- Released: July 20, 2018
- Genre: Country
- Length: 3:05
- Label: 604
- Songwriter(s): Brian Kelley; Cameron Montgomery; Rob Hatch; Randy Houser; Tyler Hubbard
- Producer(s): Joey Moi

Dallas Smith singles chronology
"One Drink Ago" (2018)	"Make 'Em Like You" (2018)	"Rhinestone World" (2018)

Music video
- "Make 'Em Like You" on YouTube

"Make 'Em Like You" is a song recorded by Canadian country music singer Dallas Smith. It was written by Tyler Hubbard and Brian Kelley of Florida Georgia Line, along with Cameron Montgomery, Rob Hatch, and Randy Houser. The song was released to radio by 604 Records as the lead single from his 2019 EP The Fall, and his 2020 album Timeless.

== Music video ==
The music video for "Make 'Em Like You" was directed by Stephano Barberis and premiered September 7, 2018.

== Chart performance ==
"Make 'Em Like You" reached a peak of Number One on the Billboard Canada Country chart dated October 27, 2018. It became Smith's fifth-consecutive Number One hit on the chart, and sixth overall, giving him the record for the most by any Canadian country artist.

== Charts ==
Chart (2018)	Peak position
Canada Country (Billboard)	1
