= Nothing Could Come Between Us =

2002 single by Theory of a Deadman

Single by Theory of a Deadman

from the album Theory of a Deadman
- Released: July 22, 2002
- Length: 3:27
- Label: Roadrunner
- Composers: Tyler Connolly; Dave Brenner; Dean Back; Tim Hart
- Lyricists: Tyler Connolly; Chad Kroeger
- Producers: Chad Kroeger; Joey Moi

Theory of a Deadman singles chronology
"Nothing Could Come Between Us" (2002)	"Make Up Your Mind" (2003)

"Nothing Could Come Between Us" is a song by Canadian hard rock group Theory of a Deadman. It was released in July 2002 as the lead single from their eponymous debut album. It represented the first major success of the band, reaching number two in Canada and number eight on the US Billboard Mainstream Rock Tracks chart.

== Content ==
The song lyrics deal with the disillusionment of a man that, despite his feelings, he does not feel like he can spend the rest of his life with someone. The song also involves him reminiscing about the good times they had and some of his favorite mannerisms of her ("Nothing could come between us, no nothing, nothing / One the favorite things she used to say").

== Track listings ==
The Australian CD includes bonus track "Above This" and the song "Invisible Man". "Invisible Man" was included on the Theory of a Deadman album while "Above This" became a downloadable track.

Australian CD single

1. "Nothing Could Come Between Us" – 3:24
2. "Above This" – 2:13
3. "Invisible Man" – 2:41

European maxi-CD single

1. "Nothing Could Come Between Us" – 3:24
2. "Inside" – 3:08
3. "Point to Prove" – 3:37
4. "Nothing Could Come Between Us" (video)

== Charts ==
=== Weekly charts ===
Chart (2002)	Peak position
Canada (Nielsen Soundscan)	2
US Mainstream Rock Tracks (Billboard)	8

=== Year-end charts ===
Chart (2002)	Position
Canada (Nielsen SoundScan)	71

== Release history ==
Region	Date	Format(s)	Label(s)	Ref.
United States	July 22, 2002	Mainstream rockactive rock radio	Roadrunner	
United States	August 26, 2002	Alternative radio	Roadrunner	
Australia	September 23, 2002	CD	Roadrunner	
