= Broken Umbrella =

2021 single by Jojo Mason

Single by Jojo Mason

from the EP Sky Full of Stars
- Released: August 20, 2021
- Genre: Country pop
- Length: 2:43
- Label: 604
- Songwriter(s): Luke Laird; Hillary Lindsey; Jordan Davis
- Producer(s): Scott Cooke

Jojo Mason singles chronology
"Chemical" (2020)	"Broken Umbrella" (2021)	"Let Me Down Easy" (2022)

Music video
- "Broken Umbrella" on YouTube

"Broken Umbrella" is a song written and recorded by Canadian country pop artist Jojo Mason. The song was the lead single off his 2021 extended play Sky Full of Stars.

== Background ==
Mason stated that "Broken Umbrella" "really speaks about who I am as an artist, showing my fun, loving, and happy side," adding "it's all about doing the best we can and enjoying that kind of positivity".

== Critical reception ==
Nanci Dagg of Canadian Beats Media reviewed the song positively stating "Mason’s vibrant vocals and stellar charisma shine through in this sweet love song".

== Commercial performance ==
"Broken Umbrella" peaked at number five on the Billboard Canada Country chart for the week of February 26, 2022. It peaked at number 89 on the Canadian Hot 100 for the same week. It was the most-played Canadian song, and the fifteenth most-played song overall on Canadian country radio in 2022, according to Mediabase.

== Music video ==
The official music video for "Broken Umbrella" premiered on ET Canada on September 8, 202 and features Mason driving his own motorcycle. The video was directed by Cole Northey and stars Jessamine Salas and Melvin Medici as a man and woman first flirting and later ending up together under an umbrella. Mason referred to the video as "one of the most fun videos" he's ever shot and felt it "captures the essence of the song".

== Charts ==
Chart performance for "Broken Umbrella"
Chart (2022)	Peak position
Canada (Canadian Hot 100)	89
Canada Country (Billboard)	5
