= Hide from a Broken Heart =

2021 song by Dallas Smith

Single by Dallas Smith

from the album Dallas Smith
- Released: November 29, 2021
- Genre: Country
- Length: 3:28
- Label: Big Loud; Local Hay
- Songwriters: Ernest Keith Smith; Geoff Warburton; Lauren LaRue; Mark Holman
- Producer: Joey Moi

Dallas Smith singles chronology
| "Some Things Never Change" (2020) | "Hide from a Broken Heart" (2021) | "Best of Me" (2022) |

Music video
- "Hide from a Broken Heart" on YouTube

"Hide from a Broken Heart" is a song recorded by Canadian country artist Dallas Smith. The song was written by Ernest Keith Smith, Geoff Warburton, Lauren LaRue, and Mark Holman, while Smith's longtime producer Joey Moi produced the track. It was the first single released by Smith after signing a global recording deal with Big Loud Records, and the lead single off his self-titled album. The song was released to radio formats in Canada, Australia, the United Kingdom, and Germany.

== Background ==
After moving from Vancouver-based 604 Records to the Nashville-based Big Loud Records, Smith took a break from sending singles to Canadian country radio for the first time in ten years as a solo artist. Smith stated that when doing A&R with his label, he always wants to pick the "most impactful song" every time. He and Big Loud wanted to wait for a "banger", and initially had a different song selected to be his debut single on the label before his labelmate Ernest sent "Hide from a Broken Heart" to Smith's producer Joey Moi. Smith said they immediately decided this song would be his Big Loud debut, adding it is a "beautifully written song" with "hooks everywhere". He stated that the song has "a very universal theme – everybody’s been through this heartbreak, we’ve all got to learn that you cannot run from heartbreak, you must face it and go through the fear in order to heal", while it has a lot of "stylistically different things in it" that "represent what I can bring to a song". He originally intended for the song to be included on an extended play that would be supported by his headlining "Some Things Never Change Tour" in the spring and summer of 2022.

== Accolades ==
Accolades for "Hide from a Broken Heart"
| Year | Association | Category | Result | Ref |
|---|---|---|---|---|
| 2022 | Canadian Country Music Awards | Record Producer of the Year - Joey Moi | Won | |

== Commercial performance ==
"Hide from a Broken Heart" reached a peak of number one on the Billboard Canada Country chart dated May 7, 2022, after 23 weeks on the chart, marking Smith's seventh consecutive number one and twelfth overall. It also peaked at #70 on the Canadian Hot 100 for the same week. The song has been certified Gold by Music Canada.

== Live performance ==
Smith debuted "Hide from a Broken Heart" at the 2021 Canadian Country Music Awards at Budweiser Gardens in London, Ontario on November 29, 2021. The show was live streamed on the Global Television Network app and Amazon Prime Video, with an encore presentation on Global's television network several days later. Smith's performance was uploaded to YouTube by the CCMA the next week.

== Music video ==
The official music video for "Hide from a Broken Heart" premiered on YouTube on November 29, 2021. Smith recorded a separate "Performance Video" with several musicians that premiered on February 17, 2022.

== Track listings ==
Digital download – single

1. "Hide from a Broken Heart" – 3:28

Digital download – single

1. "Hide from a Broken Heart" (live acoustic) 3:26

== Charts ==
Chart performance for "Hide from a Broken Heart"
| Chart (2022) | Peak position |
|---|---|
| Australia Country Hot 50 (The Music) | 26 |
| Canada Hot 100 (Billboard) | 70 |
| Canada Country (Billboard) | 1 |

== Certifications ==
Certifications for "Hide from a Broken Heart"
| Region | Certification | Certified units/sales |
|---|---|---|
| Canada (Music Canada) | Gold | 40,000^{‡} |
^{‡} Sales+streaming figures based on certification alone.
