= The Jins =

Canadian alternative rock trio

- Ben Larsen with The Jins at the X-Ray Arcade 10/12/25

Background information
- Origin: Vancouver, British Columbia, Canada
- Genres: alternative rock, grunge, punk rock
- Years active: 2014–present
- Label: 604 Records
- Members: Ben Larsen; Hudson Partridge; Jamie Warnock
- Website: www.thejins.ca

The Jins are a Canadian alternative rock band from Vancouver consisting of vocalist and guitarist Ben Larsen, drummer Jamie Warnock, and bassist Hudson Partridge.

== Background ==
The Jins formed in Vancouver, British Columbia in 2014 when Ben Larsen and Jamie Warnock began performing together. Larsen later crossed paths with Hudson Partridge while both were studying animation. For Halloween of 2015, the band had secured a show at a house party, but their original bassist backed out of the band at the last minute. In a desperate bid to save the show, Larsen would ask Partridge to learn how to play the bass from scratch in just seven days to save the gig. Partridge pulled off the feat, solidifying the three-piece lineup by 2015.

=== Etymology ===
"Jins" is derived from the word "pigeons." According to the group, the band's name was inspired by them. Frontman Ben Larsen stated that the choice was inspired by the ubiquity of pigeons in Vancouver. Larsen noted that he felt a connection to the birds, characterizing them as "misunderstood creatures."

"When I moved to Vancouver, I lived in the Downtown Eastside in a really ratty old apartment. There were pigeons everywhere down there and I felt like I could relate to them, since they live in our city amongst us but they're not really a part of our culture." -Larsen, as quoted by The Runner

A visual representation of this etymology is integrated into the cover art of their 2017 self-titled debut album, The Jins, which features an illustration of a pigeon.

== History ==
In 2017, they released their eponymous first album, The Jins on Bandcamp In 2019, they released their EP, Death Wish. On May 18, 2022, their single "Metro" peaked at #2 on the Canadian Breaking Alt chart. In 2023, they released their album It's a Life, produced by Dave Genn and mixed by Adam Kasper, with 604 Records. They released their 2024 single "Crutch" under the same record label. "Crutch" also peaked at #2 on the Canadian Breaking Alt chart on chart. The Jins have been a supporting act for artists including Buckcherry, Hockey Dad, and Rare Americans.

== Discography ==
The Jins discography
- Studio albums: 3
- EPs: 3
- Live albums: 0
- Compilation albums: 0
- Singles: 14
- Music videos: 11

As per their Bandcamp and 604 Records.

=== Extended plays ===
Year	Title	Label	Notes
2015	The Jins	Independent release	
2017	Real Food / I Can't Let My Lover Go	Independent release	
2019	Death Wish	Independent release	

=== Studio albums ===
Year	Title	Label	Notes
2017	The Jins	Independent release	
2023	It's A Life	604 Records	
2026	It's All Over	604 Records	

=== Singles ===
Year	Title	Label	Notes
2016	She's A Looker	Independent release	
2016	Spooky Skeletons	Independent release	
2019	She Said	Independent release	Breakout single
2019	Death Wish	Independent release	
2019	Pop Song	Independent release	
2019	Jack Skellington	Independent release	
2019	Radio	604 Records	
2022	Metro	604 Records	Peaked at #2 on the Canadian Breaking Alt chart
2022	Stay Please	604 Records	
2023	Effigy	604 Records	
2024	Crutch	604 Records	Peaked at #2 on the Canadian Breaking Alt
2025	You're Going Far	604 Records	
2025	Force A Metamorphosis	604 Records	
2026	I Wasn't There	604 Records	

=== Music videos ===
Year	Title
2019	She Said
2019	Death Wish
2022	Stay Please
2023	Effigy
2024	Crutch
2025	You're Going Far
2025	Force A Metamorphosis
2026	I Wasn't There
2026	It's All Over
