= Did It for the Girl =

Single by Greg Bates

from the album Greg Bates
- Released: April 16, 2012
- Genre: Country
- Length: 3:10
- Label: Republic Nashville
- Songwriters: Greg Bates; Lynn Hutton; Rodney Clawson
- Producer: Jimmy Ritchey

Greg Bates singles chronology
| "Did It for the Girl" (2012) | "Fill in the Blank" (2013) |

"Did It for the Girl" is a song recorded by American country music artist Greg Bates. It was released in April 2012 as his debut single. Bates co-wrote the song with Lynn Hutton and Rodney Clawson.

== Critical reception ==
Billy Dukes of Taste of Country gave the song four stars out of five, saying that it is "instantly memorable — if only for its clean simplicity." Matt Bjorke of Roughstock also gave the song a favorable review, writing that Bates "marries the best of the neo-traditionalist movement with the modern country world." Joseph Fafinski of Preserving Country Music called it the best single of 2012.

== Music video ==
The music video was directed by Brian Lazzaro and premiered in July 2012.

== Chart performance ==
"Did It for the Girl" debuted at number 57 on the U.S. Billboard Hot Country Songs chart for the week of April 28, 2012. It also debuted at number 100 on the U.S. Billboard Hot 100 chart for the week of October 6, 2012.

| Chart (2012–2013) | Peak position |
|---|---|
| Canada Country (Billboard) | 22 |
| US Billboard Hot 100 | 66 |
| US Hot Country Songs (Billboard) | 14 |
| US Country Airplay (Billboard) | 5 |

=== Year-end charts ===
| Chart (2012) | Position |
|---|---|
| US Hot Country Songs (Billboard) | 54 |

| Chart (2013) | Position |
|---|---|
| US Country Airplay (Billboard) | 79 |
| US Hot Country Songs (Billboard) | 97 |
