= Fionn (band) =

Canadian band

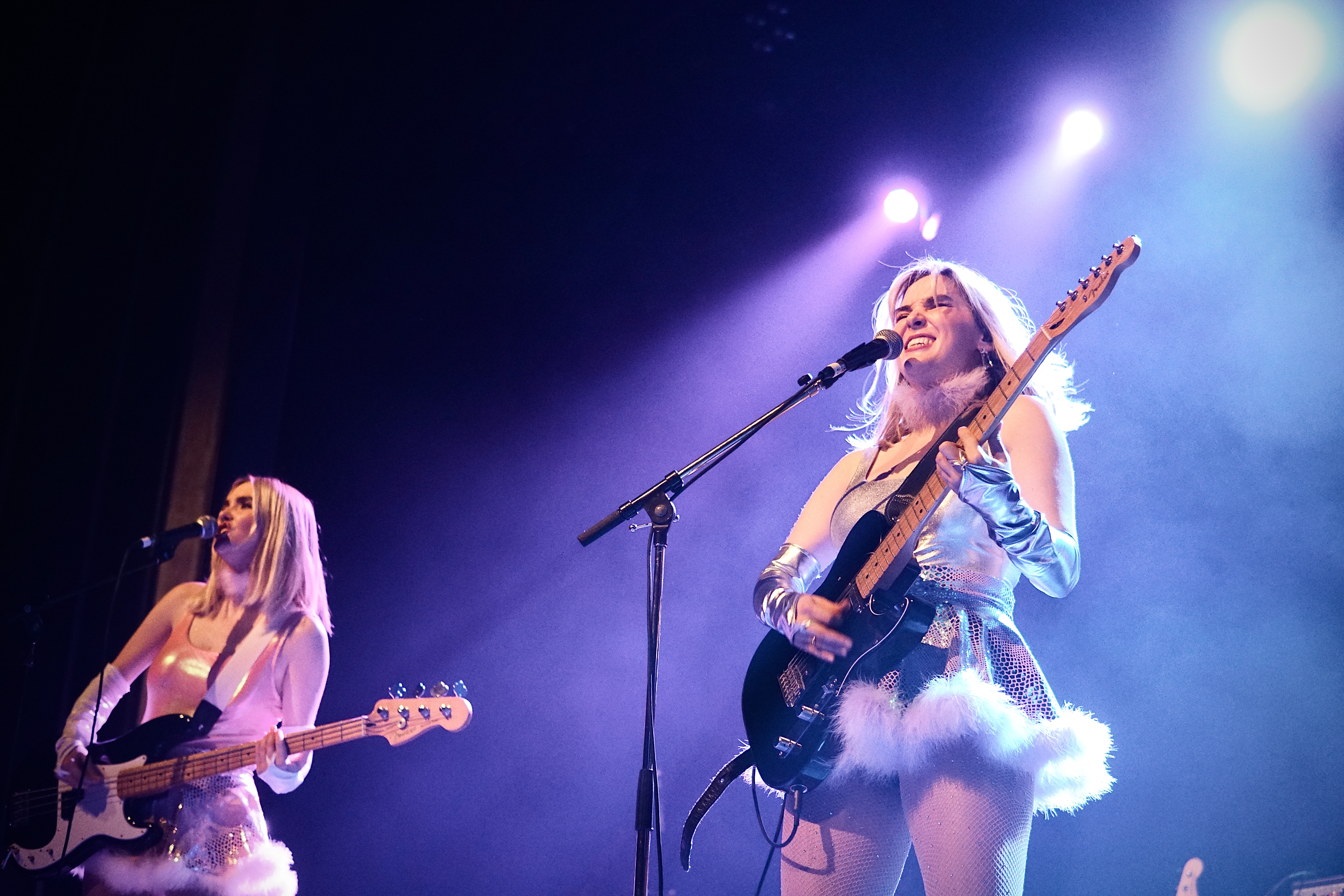
- Fionn in 2025

Background information
- Origin: British Columbia, Canada
- Years active: 2017–present
- Label: 604 Records
- Members: Alanna Finn-Morris; Brianne Finn-Morris

Fionn is a Canadian band based in Vancouver, British Columbia. The band consists of identical twin sisters Alanna and Brianne Finn-Morris.

== History ==
Identical twins Alanna and Brianne Finn-Morris grew up in White Rock, British Columbia. Their father was a musician originally who emigrated from Ireland to Canada and played in an Irish show band; their mother owns a music school in White Rock. They began performing together at the age of 12 as buskers in their hometown. They originally sang as "Alanna & Brianne", but changed their name to Fionn as an Irish influence on the first part of their shared surname. The sisters stated in 2017 that they were agnostic as to whether the band's name was pronounced “FEE-on” or “fee-UN”.

The sisters signed with Vancouver-based 604 Records in 2018.

Their first self-titled album was released in 2018, which the band described as "folk-pop with occasional Celtic twists". They followed that up with the EP Everyone's a Critic in 2020, and their second full album, Candid Constellations, in 2021. Their third full album, I Might Start Smoking, was released in 2023. They toured across Canada in support of the album in the fall of 2023.

In 2025, Fionn released the single "Blow", which a critic described as "an eruption of pent-up frustration, sarcasm, and righteous anger". "Blow" reached #1 on the Billboard Canada Modern Rock Airplay chart. On October 17, 2025 Fionn released their 4th studio album entitled Scum just before heading off on their first headlining tour throughout the Western United States and Canada. Their tour included stops in Seattle, Olympia, Portland, Salt Lake City, Los Angeles, Phoenix, San Diego, Las Vegas, San Francisco, Vancouver, Edmonton and Calgary.

In December 2025 Fionn received a songwriting award from SOCAN for "Blow" which reached No.1 on the Mediabase Alternative Chart in Canada.

== Discography ==
=== Studio albums ===
List of studio albums, with selected details
Title	Details
Fionn	Released: October 26, 2018; Label: 604 Records; Formats: CD, digital download, streaming
I Might Start Smoking	Released: June 9, 2023; Label: 604 Records; Formats: CD, digital download, streaming
Scum	Released: October 17, 2025; Label: 604 Records; Formats: CD, LP, digital download, streaming

=== EPs ===
List of extended plays, with selected details
Title	Details
Everyone's a Critic	Released: July 17, 2020; Label: 604 Records; Formats: LP, digital download, streaming
Candid Constellations	Released: May 21, 2021; Label: 604 Records; Formats: Digital download, streaming

=== Singles ===
Year	Song	Chart peak	Album
Year	Song	CAN Mod Rock	Album
2017	"Skeleton"	×	Fionn
2018	"Magazine Face"	×	Fionn
2018	"Robert"	×	Fionn
2018	"The Horns Are Fake"	×	Fionn
2018	"Castles"	×	Fionn
2019	"Get Stoned"	×	Everyone's a Critic
2020	"Mattress on the Floor"	×	Everyone's a Critic
2020	"Modern Medication"	×	Everyone's a Critic
2020	"Dance Monkey"	×	Non-album single
2020	"Space"	×	Candid Constellations
2020	"Winter Love"	×	Non-album single
2021	"Dirty Dancing"	×	Candid Constellations
2021	"Taste for It"	×	Candid Constellations
2021	"Let Me Go"	×	Candid Constellations
2022	"Picnic on the Moon"	×	Non-album singles
2022	"All Good"	×	Non-album singles
2023	"18"	×	I Might Start Smoking
2023	"I Might Start Smoking!!"	×	I Might Start Smoking
2024	"Bad at Being Casual"	×	Scum
2024	"Snake Behavior"	×	Scum
2025	"Blow"	1	Scum
2025	"Banshee"	—	Scum
2025	"I Put My Makeup On"	7	Scum
"—" denotes a release that did not chart. "×" denotes periods where charts did not exist or were not archived.
