= Rodney Clawson =

American country music songwriter

- Born: Rodney Dale Clawson; Gruver, Texas, United States
- Origin: Nashville, Tennessee, United States
- Years active: 2000–present

Rodney Dale Clawson (born in Gruver, Texas, United States) is an American country music songwriter. Clawson has written singles recorded by Kenny Chesney, Jason Aldean, Faith Hill, George Strait and Luke Bryan, among others.

== Biography ==
Clawson was raised in Gruver, Texas. Through the encouragement of his friend and former student John Rich, Clawson signed to his publishing contract in 2000. His first hit as a songwriter was "I Can't Be Your Friend" by Rushlow.

Clawson co-wrote the songs "Why", "Amarillo Sky" and "Johnny Cash" for Jason Aldean. In 2008, he received a Song of the Year nomination from the Country Music Association for George Strait's number 1 single "I Saw God Today". That same year, Clawson moved to a publishing contract with Big Loud Shirt, owned by songwriter Craig Wiseman.

Other artists who have recorded his songs include Faith Hill, Big & Rich and Buddy Jewell. He has also produced singles by Jake Owen and James Wesley.

He is married to singer-songwriter Nicolle Galyon, who was also a contestant on the second season of The Voice. They have two children- a daughter, Charlie Jo Clawson (born May 29, 2013) and a son, Ford Sterling Clawson (born April 14, 2015). He also has three children from a previous marriage, including Brad Clawson, who is also a Nashville songwriter.

== List of singles written by Rodney Clawson ==
Song title	Artist
"Amarillo Sky"	Jason Aldean
"American Kids"	Kenny Chesney
"Bartender"	Lady Antebellum
"Brown Eyes Baby"	Keith Urban
"Burnin' It Down"	Jason Aldean
"Callin' Me When I'm Lonely"	Sheryl Crow
"Comin' Around"	Josh Thompson
"Confession"	Florida Georgia Line
"Cornfields"	Blake Wise
"Crash My Party"	Luke Bryan
"Crazy Town"	Jason Aldean
"Did It for the Girl"	Greg Bates
"Dirt"	Florida Georgia Line
"Don't Let Me Be Lonely"	The Band Perry
"Drink on It"	Blake Shelton
"Drunk on You"	Luke Bryan
"Feel Like a Rock Star"	Kenny Chesney with Tim McGraw
"Float"	Tim and the Glory Boys
"Get Your Shine On"	Florida Georgia Line
"A Girl Like You"	Dallas Smith
"Good to Go"	John Corbett
"Guitar Slinger"	Crossin Dixon
"Helluva Life"	Frankie Ballard
"I Can't Be Your Friend"	Rushlow
"I Saw God Today"	George Strait
"If It Gets You Where You Wanna Go"	Dallas Smith
"Johnny Cash"	Jason Aldean
"Just Wanna Rock N' Roll"	Rodney Atkins
"Lettin' the Night Roll"	Justin Moore
"Lost in This Moment"	Big & Rich
"Messed Up as Me"	Keith Urban
"Never Mind Me"	Big & Rich
"Numbers"	Jason Michael Carroll
"Old School"	Chuck Wicks
"One Drink Ago"	Dallas Smith and Terri Clark
"One of Those Nights"	Tim McGraw
"Round Here"	Florida Georgia Line
"Sippin' On Fire"	Florida Georgia Line
"Slow Rollin'"	Dallas Smith
"Some Things Never Change"	Dallas Smith feat. Hardy
"Somebody Somewhere"	Dallas Smith
"Southern Girl"	Tim McGraw
"Sunshine and Summertime"	Faith Hill
"Sure Be Cool If You Did"	Blake Shelton
"Sweet Southern Comfort"	Buddy Jewell
"Take a Little Ride"	Jason Aldean
"Tailgate to Heaven"	Shawn Austin feat. Chris Lane
"Til It's Gone"	Kenny Chesney
"Ultimate Love"	Phil Vassar
"Where I Come From"	Montgomery Gentry
"Revelation"	Morgan Wallen
"Why"	Jason Aldean
"You Look Like I Need a Drink"	Justin Moore
