= Shawn Austin =

Canadian country singer (born 1989)

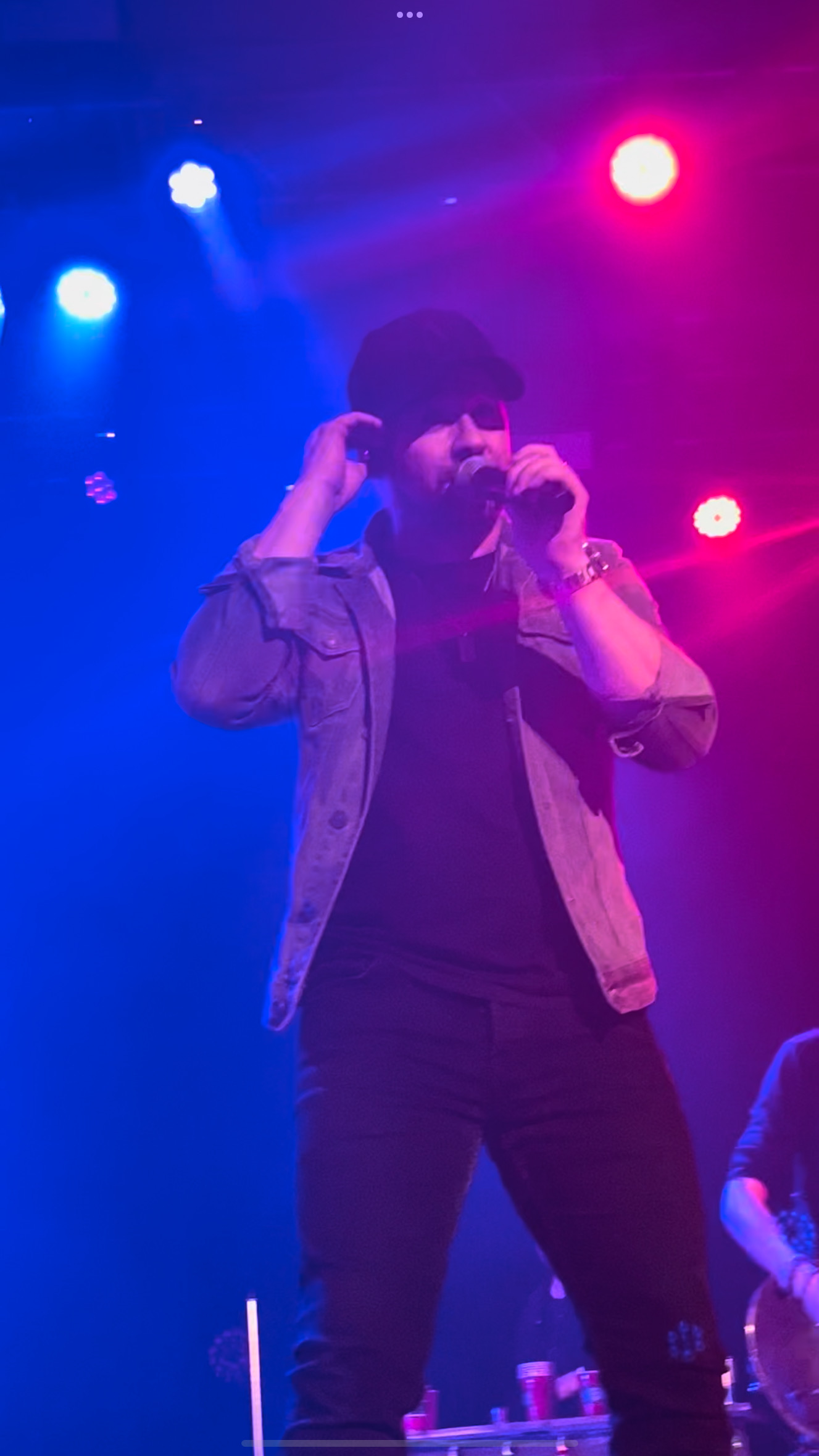
- Austin performing in Toronto, Ontario, in April 2024

Background information
- Born: Shawn Robert Hallgren; 13 January 1989 (age 37); Vancouver, British Columbia, Canada
- Genres: Country
- Occupation: Singer-songwriter
- Years active: 2016–present
- Labels: 604; Local Hay; Big Loud; Steelhead Music
- Website: shawnaustinmusic.com

Shawn Austin (born January 13, 1989) is a Canadian country singer and songwriter. He has achieved five top ten singles at Canadian country radio, including "Tailgate to Heaven".

== Early life ==
Born and raised in Vancouver, British Columbia, Austin elected to pursue a career in country music due to its "wholesomeness and authenticity", naming Garth Brooks as one of his influences. He stated Stevie Ray Vaughan was the reason he began playing the guitar, and that Michael Bublé's melodies are an influence in his music as well.

== Career ==
After debuting as an independent artist, Austin signed with Dallas Smith's label Steelhead Music and released the single "Paradise Found" in 2017. The song peaked at number eight on the Billboard Canada Country chart giving Austin a top ten hit to start his career. He followed it up with the single "Get Me There" in 2018.

Later that year, Austin released "You Belong". The track was the lead single off his debut six-track extended play Shawn Austin, released on September 28, 2018. In 2019, he released the single "What Do I Know", which later peaked at number seven on Canada Country and became a new career high. He followed that up with "The Little Things" in 2020. That same year, he appeared on the NBC television show Songland in the United States, where he pitched a song titled "Ain't Goin' Nowhere" to Florida Georgia Line, and later partnered with Ester Dean on reworking it with the title "Lean On". Ultimately, Austin finished as a runner-up, as Florida Georgia Line chose to record fellow Canadian songwriter Griffen Palmer's song "Second Guessing" instead.

In August 2021, Austin signed with Big Loud Records and their Canadian-based imprint Local Hay, a joint venture between the label, Dallas Smith, producer Scott Cooke, and partner Alex Seif. He then released the single "Tailgate to Heaven" featuring American country singer Chris Lane. Austin was an opening act on Dallas Smith's "Some Things Never Change Tour" in the spring and early summer of 2022. In June 2022, he released the extended play Planes Don't Wait, which included "Tailgate to Heaven" and the singles "Get You" and "Slip". In 2023, Austin was an opener for Old Dominion on the Canadian dates of their "No Bad Vibes Tour". Later that year, he released the extended play Dirt Roads Downtown, which includes the single "Settle for a Drink". In the spring of 2024, Austin embarked on "The Country Mixtape Tour" across Canada as a co-headliner alongside Tyler Joe Miller and Andrew Hyatt. That same spring, he released the extended play Words.

== Discography ==
=== Extended plays ===
Title	Details
Shawn Austin	Released: September 28, 2018; Label: Steelhead Music Inc.; Format: Digital download, streaming
Shawn Austin Acoustic	Released: June 21, 2019; Label: Steelhead Music Inc.; Format: Digital download, streaming
The Little Things	Released: June 17, 2020; Label: Steelhead Music Inc.; Format: Digital download, streaming
Planes Don't Wait	Released: June 29, 2022; Label: Local Hay / Big Loud; Format: Digital download, streaming
Dirt Roads Downtown	Released: July 13, 2023; Label: Local Hay / Big Loud; Format: Digital download, streaming
Words	Released: April 5, 2024; Label: Local Hay / Big Loud; Format: Digital download, streaming

=== Singles ===
List of singles, with selected chart positions
Year	Title	Peak chart positions		Certifications	Album
Year	Title	CAN	CAN Country	Certifications	Album
2017	"Paradise Found"	—	8		Non-album singles
2018	"Get Me There"	—	18		Non-album singles
2018	"You Belong"	—	12		Shawn Austin
2019	"What Do I Know"	—	7		The Little Things
2020	"The Little Things"	—	49		The Little Things
2021	"Tailgate to Heaven" (featuring Chris Lane)	61	5	MC: Gold	Planes Don't Wait
2022	"Get You"	—	—		Planes Don't Wait
2022	"Slip"	—	10		Planes Don't Wait
2023	"Settle for a Drink"	—	8		Dirt Roads Downtown
2024	"Words"	—	32		Words
"—" denotes releases that did not chart.

=== Music videos ===
Year	Video
2019	"What Do I Know"
2020	"The Little Things"
2021	"Tailgate to Heaven" (with Chris Lane)

== Awards and nominations ==
Year	Association	Category	Nominated work	Result	Ref
2019	British Columbia Country Music Association	Fans' Choice	—N/a	Won	
2019	Canadian Country Music Association	Rising Star	—N/a	Nominated	
2021	Canadian Country Music Association	Rising Star	—N/a	Nominated	
2022	Canadian Country Music Association	Single of the Year	"Tailgate to Heaven"	Nominated	
2023	Canadian Country Music Association	Album of the Year	Planes Don't Wait	Nominated	
2024	Canadian Country Music Association	Musical Collaboration of the Year	"Day After Day" (with Dallas Smith)	Nominated	
