= Jojo Mason =

Canadian country music singer-songwriter (born 1990)

JoJo Mason
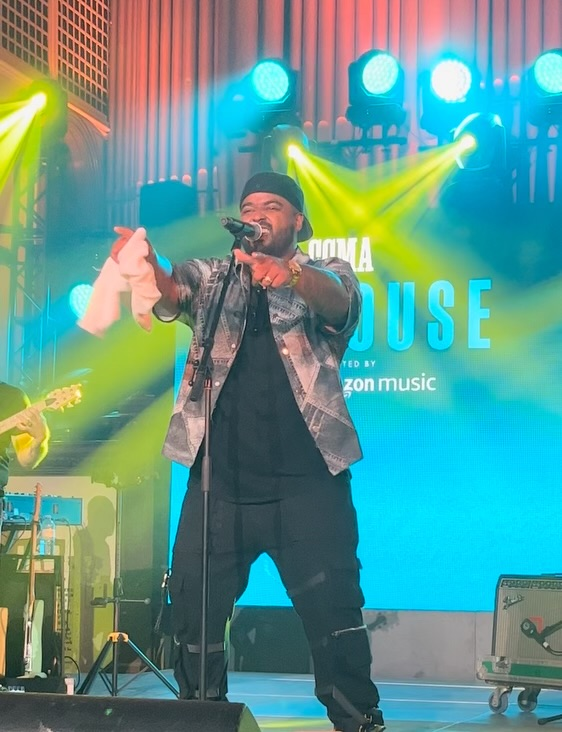

Background information
- Born: February 26, 1990 (age 35); Regina, Saskatchewan, Canada
- Genres: Country; country pop
- Occupation: Singer-songwriter
- Instrument(s): Guitar, piano
- Years active: 2015–present
- Labels: Manicdown, 604

JoJo Mason (born February 26, 1990) is a Canadian country music singer-songwriter. Mason moved to Victoria, British Columbia in 2004 to play hockey at the junior (Saanich Jr Braves, VIJHL) ranks but suffered a herniated disk. Later, he met songwriter/producer Dan Swinimer and worked on developing his vocals. He signed to Manicdown Productions in 2014 and released his debut single, "It's All Good", in early 2015. Mason's second single, "Good Kinda Love", was released in November 2015, before he signed with 604 Records for the release of his third single, "Red Dress", in May 2016. In 2021, Mason achieved his first gold-certification for his single "Better on You", and charted on the Canadian Hot 100 for the first time with the single "Broken Umbrella".

== Discography ==
=== Albums ===
Title	Details
Both Sides of the Bar	Release date: June 9, 2017; Label: 604

=== Extended plays ===
Title	Details
Chapter Two	Release date: September 13, 2019; Label: 604
Changes	Release date: October 9, 2020; Label: 604
Sky Full of Stars	Release date: October 22, 2021; Label: 604
Bettin' on Me	Release date: February 7, 2025; Label: 604

=== Singles ===
Year	Title	Peak positions		Certifications	Album
Year	Title	CAN	CAN Country	Certifications	Album
2015	"It's All Good"	—	10		Both Sides of the Bar
2015	"Good Kinda Love"	—	12		Both Sides of the Bar
2016	"Red Dress"	—	9		Both Sides of the Bar
2016	"Made for You"	—	20		Both Sides of the Bar
2017	"Something to Wrap My Heart Around"	—	8		Both Sides of the Bar
2017	"Edge of the Night"	—	22		Both Sides of the Bar
2018	"Future"	—	21		Chapter Two
2019	"Better on You"	—	7	MC: Gold	Chapter Two
2019	"As If We Won't"	—	20		Chapter Two
2020	"Chemical"	—	30		Changes
2021	"Broken Umbrella"	89	5		Sky Full of Stars
2022	"Let Me Down Easy"	—	5		Sky Full of Stars
2024	"Bottom Shelf"	—	22		Bettin' on Me
2025	"Just Like You"	—	59		Bettin' on Me

=== Christmas singles ===
Year	Single	Peak positions	Album
Year	Single	CAN Country	Album
2022	"Don't Hang the Mistletoe"	42	Non-album single

=== Music videos ===
Year	Single	Director
2016	"Red Dress"	Stephano Barberis
2016	"Made For You"	Daniel Keen
2017	"Something to Wrap My Heart Around"	
2018	"Edge of the Night"	
2018	"Future"	
2019	"Better on You"	
2020	"Chemical"	
2021	"Broken Umbrella"	Cole Northey

== Awards and nominations ==
Year	Award	Category	Recipient/Work	Result	Ref
2016	BCCMA	Male Vocalist of the Year	Jojo Mason	Nominated	
2016	BCCMA	Single of the Year	"Good Kinda Love"	Nominated	
2016	BCCMA	Songwriter of the Year	"Good Kinda Love"	Nominated	
2017	CCMA	Rising Star Award	Jojo Mason	Nominated	
2019	CCMA	Rising Star Award	Jojo Mason	Nominated	
