= Greg Bates =

American country music singer

- Born: September 25, 1987 (age 37); Nashville, Tennessee, U.S.
- Origin: Brentwood, Tennessee, U.S.
- Occupation: Singer-songwriter
- Instrument: Vocals
- Years active: 2011–present
- Labels: Republic Nashville

Greg Bates (born September 25, 1987) is an American country music singer formerly signed to Republic Nashville. Bates also is a songwriter, producer, singer, and guitarist.

== Early life ==
In 2006, Bates graduated from Ravenwood High School. Bates then graduated in 2010 with a degree in Music Business from Belmont University. He signed a recording contract in the fall of 2011. Bates quietly parted ways with Republic Nashville towards the end of 2013.

== Personal life ==
He proposed to girlfriend Shelley Skidmore on Valentine's Day 2014. The couple was married on May 2, 2015 in Stanton, Kentucky. Stanton is Shelley's hometown. The two posted up wedding pictures on Instagram.

== Musical career ==
In April 2012, Bates released his debut single "Did It for the Girl", which debuted at Number 57 on the Hot Country Songs chart dated for April 28, 2012. Billy Dukes gave the song four stars out of five, saying that it is "instantly memorable — if only for its clean simplicity." Bates made his Grand Ole Opry debut in April 2012. The album's second single, "Fill in the Blank," was released to country radio on February 11, 2013. Bates has received air play as a "Highway Find" on satellite radio channel The Highway (Sirius XM).

== Discography ==
=== Extended plays ===
Title	Details	Peak chart positions	
Title	Details	US Country	US Heat
Greg Bates	Release date: July 10, 2012; Label: Republic Nashville	72	43

=== Singles ===
Year	Single	Peak chart positions				Album
Year	Single	US Country	US Country Airplay	US	CAN Country	Album
2012	"Did It for the Girl"	14	5	66	22	Greg Bates
2013	"Fill in the Blank"	—	45	—	—	Greg Bates
"—" denotes releases that did not chart

=== Music videos ===
Year	Video	Director
2012	"Did It for the Girl"	Brian Lazzaro
