= MusicRow =

American trade publication

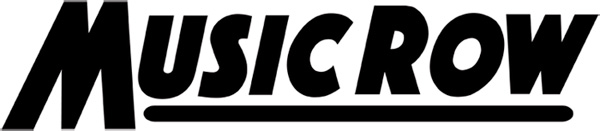
- Frequency: Bi-monthly
- Publisher: Sherod Robertson
- Founded: 1981
- Country: United States
- Based in: Nashville, Tennessee
- Language: English
- Website: musicrow.com

MusicRow is a Nashville music industry trade publication. The publication delivers online content in addition to six annual print magazines including its InCharge, Artist Roster and Publisher directories. MusicRow Enterprises is also home to song pitch-sheet RowFax, and the MusicRow radio chart.

== MusicRow magazine history ==
David M. Ross founded the enterprise in Nashville beginning April 1981 as a one-page directory and fostered its growth for almost three decades. The publication was acquired from Ross in 2008 by SouthComm Communications. In 2010, Sherod Robertson acquired the enterprise and is currently its publisher.

== RowFax ==
RowFax began in 1992, sending out breaking news, song pitch lists and industry news each Friday by fax machine. Today, the service digitally distributes weekly information about current recording projects searching for songs to record. The service is used primarily by professional music publishers, songwriters, producers, artists, and A&R executives. Each entry contains artist, label, producer, recording schedule, project description and contact details when available. The publication is not involved in pitching, reviewing, listening to or owning songs.

== MusicRow chart ==
The MusicRow Country Breakout Chart is published each week, with spin-based measurement used to determine single rankings. Primarily, the chart is focused on exposing new music played on secondary market radio stations. The annual MusicRow Chart Airplay Awards are presented to those who accrued the most total spins in categories: Artist of the Year, Label of the Year, Breakout Artist of the Year, and Independent Artist of the Year.

== Events and awards ==
MusicRow hosts its MusicRow Country Breakout Awards during the Annual Country Radio Seminar in Nashville recognizing the highest number of spins artists or labels receive from chart reporting stations throughout the year. In addition, the enterprise hosts its annual MusicRow Awards honoring the Top Ten Album All-Star Musicians, determined by album credits, and the reader-voted awards Breakthrough Artist, Breakthrough Songwriter, Song of the Year and Producer of the Year. In 2012, Robertson introduced the Rising Women on the Row event to salute up-and-coming women who have made substantial contributions to the Nashville music industry early in their careers.
