= Dave Cohen (musician) =

Canadian-born musician

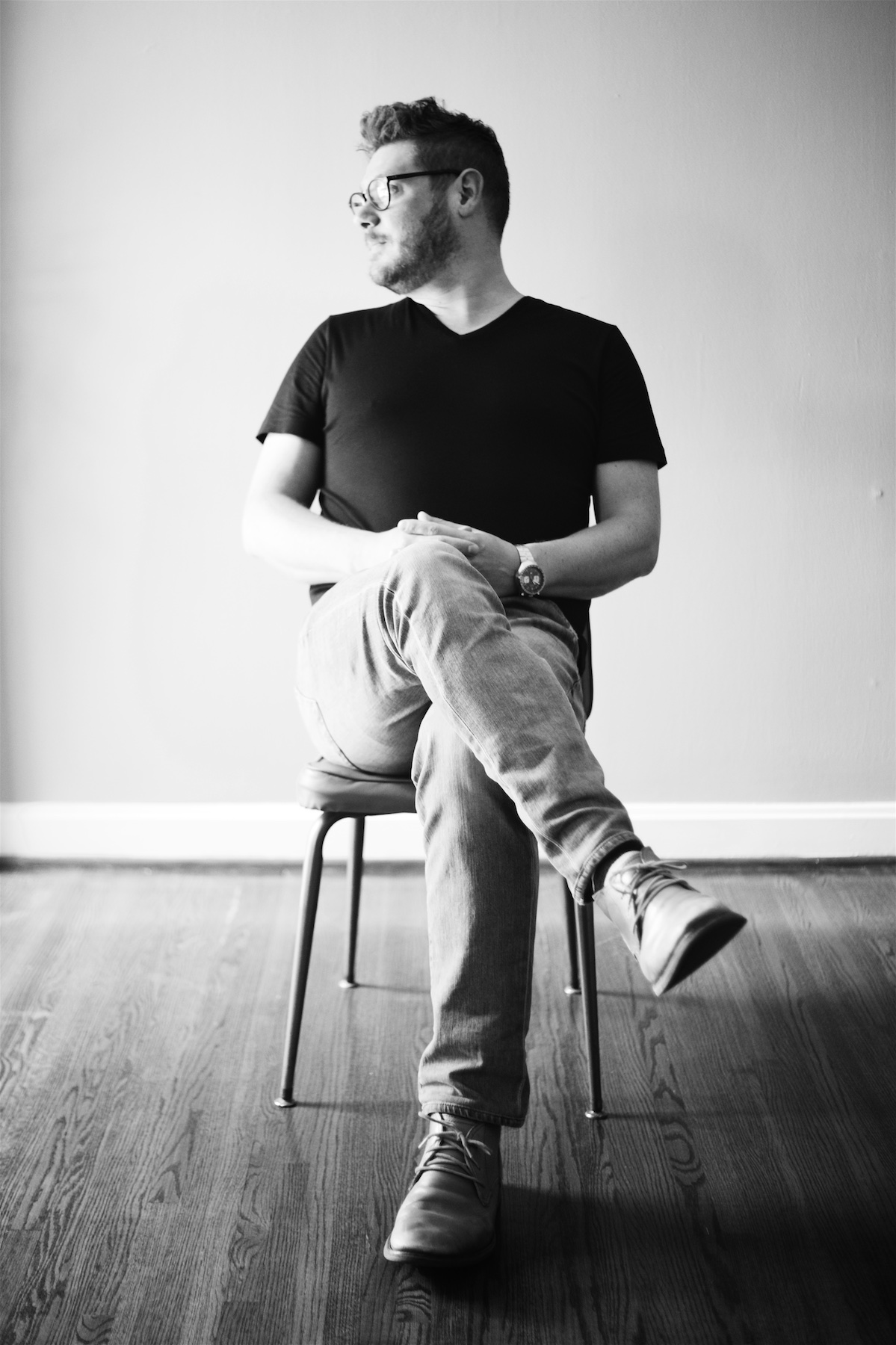
Dave Cohen, studio musician and producer.

David Ross Cohen is a Canadian-born musician, songwriter, and producer based out of Nashville, Tennessee. As a keyboardist, Cohen has recorded with Florida Georgia Line, Carrie Underwood, Kid Rock, Steven Tyler, and Reba McEntire. Throughout his career, he has accumulated several awards including Academy of Country Music Keyboard Player of the Year in 2017, 2019, 2021 and 2023 and MusicRow All-Star Keyboards Player in 2018 and 2020, 2021, 2022, 2023 and 2024. Also making a name for himself as a producer, Cohen has produced for the likes of Jake Owen, Dallas Smith, Chris Lane, Morgan Wallen, Hardy, BigXthaPlug, Shaboozey, Maddox Batson, Elle King.

== Early life and career ==
Cohen was born August 30, 1985, in Toronto, Ontario, and moved to Calgary, Alberta at age 5. It was when he moved to Calgary that he began classical piano lessons. He attended Henry Wise Wood Senior High School in Calgary and later attended Humber College in Toronto where he focused on jazz performance, specifically jazz piano. Cohen began his career in Canada touring with stars Johnny Reid and Amanda Marshall. He was nominated twice for Keyboard Player of the Year at the Canadian Country Music Awards.

== Current career ==
Cohen moved to Nashville in April 2007 and has since amassed a number of notable credits. He began his time in Nashville touring with the likes of Joe Nichols, Big & Rich, and Wynonna Judd before making the shift to session work as a studio musician in 2012. Cohen has worked in the studio with a wide range of artists from Rascal Flatts to Ed Sheeran. Some of the most prominent country music artists he has worked with include Florida Georgia Line, Carrie Underwood, Old Dominion, Brett Eldredge, Chris Young, Walker Hayes, Jon Pardi, Cole Swindell, Josh Turner, Reba McEntire, Brooks and Dunn, and Kip Moore. In addition to working with these esteemed artists, Cohen has also collaborated with top notch producers like Joey Moi, Dann Huff, Tony Brown, Byron Gallimore, and Shane McAnally.

While making a name for himself as a successful studio musician, Cohen has also recently been working as a producer. Cohen has produced Australian artist Mick Lindsay and teamed up with fellow producer Joey Moi to co-produce Chris Lane's “Laps Around the Sun."

Cohen has worked on music from a number of genres including Country, Hip-Hop, Christian, and Rock. Cohen recently worked on Reba McEntire's “Sing it Now: Songs of Faith & Hope,” which won Best Roots Gospel Album at the 2018 GRAMMY Awards.

== Discography ==
Credits as a producer
Year	Song title	Artist	Recognitions
2018	Rhinestone World	Dallas Smith	#1 single
2018	One Drink Ago	Dallas Smith and Teri Clark	
2023	Hung Up	Alli Walker	
2019	Drop	Dallas Smith	
2019	Cover Me Up	Morgan Wallen	
2018	About You	MacKenzie Porter	#1 single
2019	Homemade	Jake Owen	
2019	Drink All Day	Jake Owen	
2019	Twang	Mason Ramsey	
2018	Laps Around the Sun	Chris Lane	
Year	EP title	Artist	Recognitions
2018	This Ole Boy	Hardy	
2019	Where to Find Me	Hardy	

Dave Cohen Comprehensive Discography
Year	Album	Artist
2026	Pray Hard	BigXThaPlug
2026	About You	BigXThaPlug
2026	From The Bottom	BigXThaPlug
2026	Long Live Fresh	BigXThaPlug
2026	Hope You're Happy	BigXThaPlug
2026	Demons	Anella
2026	Simple Things	Ne-Yo
2026	24-7	BigXThaPlug
2026	If I See Her Again	Maddox Batson
2026	Can't Have Both	Anella
2026	Here and Home	Anella
2026	Jeans On	Elle King
2018	Break Up in the End	Cole Swindell
2018	Somebody's Been Drinkin'	Cole Swindell
2018	Simple - Single	Florida Georgia Line
2018	Colorado - Single	Florida Georgia Line
2018	Cry Pretty - Single	Carrie Underwood
2018	Famous - Single	Mason Ramsey
2018	This One's for You Too	Luke Combs
2018	Jake Owen - Single	Jake Owen
2018	Reason to Drink - Single	Cole Swindell
2018	The World Can Wait	Waylon
2018	The Ones Who Got Me Here - Single	Cole Swindell
2018	Bridges - EP	A Thousand Horses
2018	Jameson Rodgers - EP	Jameson Rodgers
2017	Sing it Now: Songs of Faith & Hope	Reba McEntire
2017	All Over - Single	Cale Dodds
2017	The Next Episode - EP	Bobby Bones & The Raging Idiots
2017	Greatest Show on Earth - Single	Kid Rock
2017	Mabelle - EP	Seth Ennis
2017	Up Down - Single	Moran Wallen (Ft. Florida Georgia Line)
2017	Laps Around the Sun	Chris Lane
2017	Anchors	Will Hoge
2017	Back to Us	Rascal Flatts
2017	Black Irish	Shannon McNally
2017	Boom.	Walker Hayes
2017	Brett Eldredge	Brett Eldredge
2017	Castaway	Brett Eldredge
2017	Current Mood	Dustin Lynch
2017	Deep South	Josh Turner
2017	Happy Endings	Old Dominion
2017	I Don't Believe We've Met	Danielle Bradbery
2017	Lambs & Lions	Chase Rice
2017	Lee Brice	Lee Brice
2017	Losing Sleep	Chris Young
2017	Slow Heart	Kip Moore
2017	Sweet Southern Sugar	Kid Rock
2017	The Bus Songs	Toby Keith
2017	When the Good Guys Win	Granger Smith
2017	Hell If I Know - Single	Chase Bryant
2017	Just for the Record - Single	Lucie Silvas
2017	Steel Union - EP	Steel Union
2017	Close Ties	Rodney Crowell
2017	Road Less Traveled	Lauren Alaina
2017	Hold On - Single	Paul McDonald
2017	Austin Burke - EP	Austin Burke
2016	This Song - EP	Mick Lindsay
2016	True Experience - EP	Tyler Boone
2016	A Little Country	The Runaway Hamsters
2016	Summer - EP	Cassadee Pope
2016	Tattooed Heart	Ronnie Dunn
2016	Adam Craig - EP	Adam Craig
2016	Side Effects	Dallas Smith
2016	Close - Single	Ryan Kinder
2016	The Greatest Gift of All	Rascal Flatts
2016	Ryan Hurd - EP	Ryan Hurd
2016	We're All Somebody from Somewhere	Steven Tyler
2016	Dig Your Roots	Florida Georgia Line
2016	Rogue Waves	Miguel
2016	Down Home Sessions III	Cole Swindell
2016	Fired Up	Randy Houser
2016	Flatliner	Cole Swindell
2016	Girl Problems	Chris Lane
2016	It Must Be Christmas	Chris Young
2016	Music is Medicine	Marie Osmond
2016	The Critics Give it 5 Stars	Bobby Bones & The Raging Idiots
2016	This Old Thing	Kree Harrison
2016	You Should Be Here	Cole Swindell
2015	California Sunrise	Jon Pardi
2015	Down Home Sessions II	Cole Swindell
2015	I'm Comin' Over	Chris Young
2015	Meat and Candy	Old Dominion
2015	Michael Ray	Michael Ray
2015	The Making of a Man	Griffin Anthony
2015	Wild Ones	Kip Moore
2014	Redeemer: A Nashville Tribute to Jesus Christ	Nashville Tribute Band
2014	Chase Bryant - EP	Chase Bryant
2014	Wake Me Up - Single	Tebey
2014	Rhythm and Whiskey	Frank Foster
2013	Waiting on Daylight	Bart Walker
2011	Ryan Broshear	Ryan Broshear
