= Dallas Smith =

Canadian musician

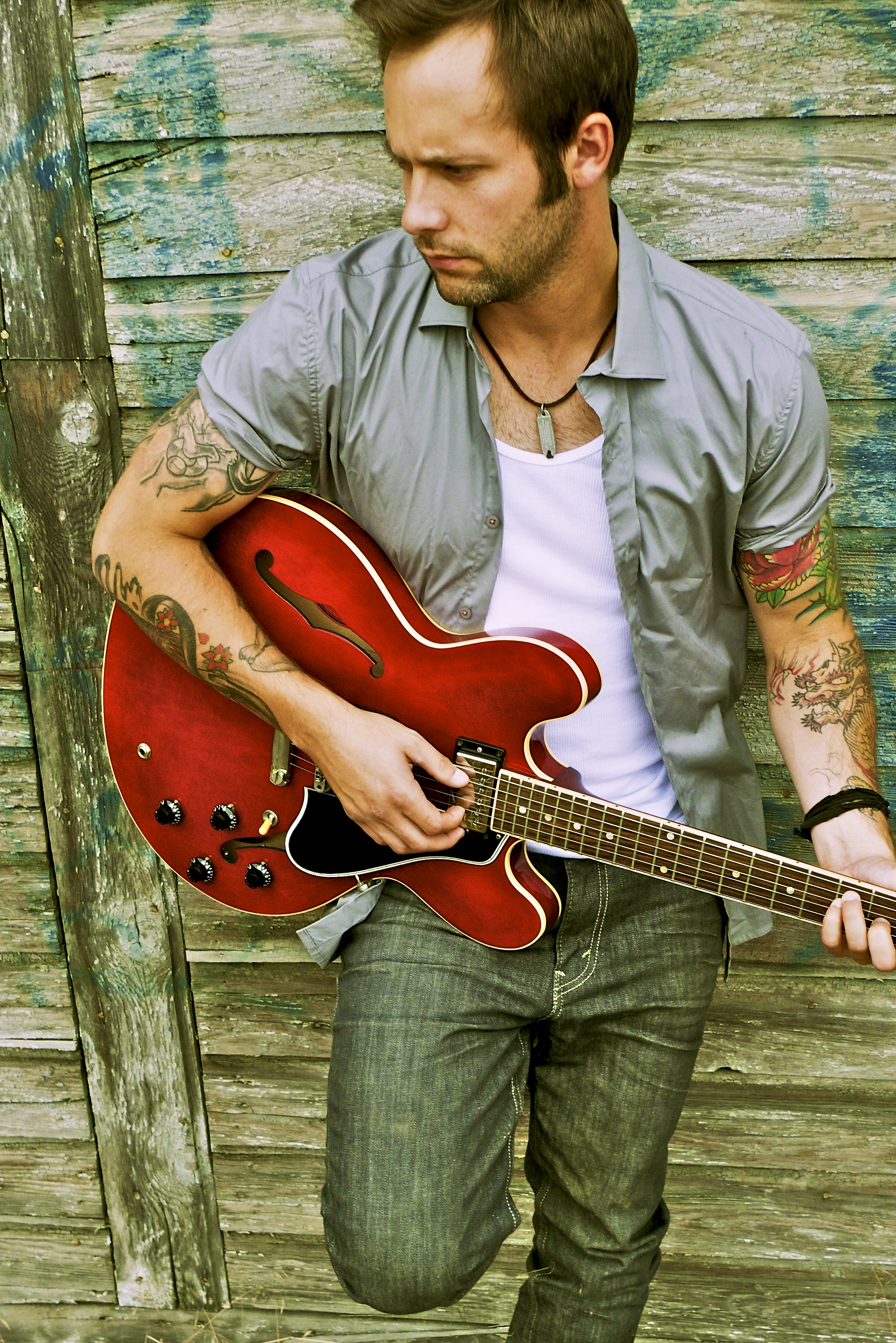
- Smith circa 2011

Background information
- Born: Dallas Hendry Smith; December 4, 1977 (age 48); New Westminster, British Columbia, Canada
- Origin: Langley, British Columbia, Canada
- Genres: Country; country rock; alternative rock; hard rock; post-grunge; country pop; alternative country
- Occupations: Singer; songwriter
- Years active: 1999–present
- Labels: Big Loud; Local Hay; 604; Republic Nashville; Blaster
- Formerly of: Default
- Spouse: Kristen Smith (m. 2012)
- Website: dallassmithmusic.com

Dallas Hendry Smith (born December 4, 1977) is a Canadian singer and songwriter, who performs both as a solo country music artist and as lead singer for the hard rock band Default. He is currently signed to Big Loud Records. Smith is the current record holder of most number one hits among all male Canadian artists on Billboard's Canada Country chart, at eleven. With Side Effects, Smith also became the first Canadian country artist in the Nielsen BDS era to chart four consecutive number one singles from one album (Shania Twain charted three consecutive number one hits from her 1997 release Come On Over), a feat he would then top with his next album, Timeless.

At the end of 2012, Mediabase named Smith the most played Canadian country act and number eight overall at the format.

== Music career ==
=== Early career ===
Dallas Smith always had a passion for music growing up. Some of his main influences were The Beatles and female country singers Reba McEntire and The Judds. Due to his shyness, Smith was reluctant to express his musical talent until he made the decision to face his fear and play cover songs with a band consisting of some of his friends. He signed his first record deal when he was 21.

=== 1999–2009: Default ===
Before his solo career, Smith was the lead singer of Default, a hard rock and post-grunge band from Vancouver, British Columbia. Formed in 1999, it continued until 2013. Default's debut 2001 album, The Fallout, achieved instant success due to strong radio play of "Wasting My Time" and "Deny". In 2002, Default won the Juno Award for "Best New Group". On April 30, 2003, the record achieved a platinum album RIAA certification, signifying a million records sold. The band also released the album Elocation (2003) which was certified gold, One Thing Remains (2005) and Comes and Goes (2009).

=== 2011–2012: Jumped Right In and Boys of Fall Tour ===
Jumped Right In was released on May 22, 2012, via 604 Records under the production of Joey Moi. The album features tracks written by Smith along with Moi, Rodney Clawson, Craig Wiseman, Dustin Lynch, Chris Tompkins, Zac Maloy, Chad Kroeger and more. It peaked at number 19 on the Canadian Albums Chart and has generated five charted singles on the Canadian Hot 100. The album was nominated for Country Album of the Year at the 2013 Juno Awards and was also nominated as Album of the Year for the 2013 Canadian Country Music Association Awards. The album has sold over 100,000 digital singles to date.

In November 2012, Smith performed on his first solo tour, co-headlining with Chad Brownlee. The tour was billed as the Boys of Fall Tour and traveled across Canada, hitting 22 cities. The tour sold out on 20 of its dates, including the Commodore Theatre in Vancouver. Smith performed at many Canadian country festivals through 2012 and 2013. In March 2013, Smith went on a sold-out Canadian tour with Bob Seger.

Stemming from the success of the Boys of Fall Tour, Smith and Brownlee teamed up to create the annual Boys of Fall Charity Golf Tournament and Concert. The tournament took place at the Redwoods Golf Course in Langley, British Columbia on August 27, 2013, and was sponsored by the radio station JRfm. Proceeds from the event were donated to Basics for Babies, an organization that assists families coping with the challenges of raising a young infant by providing them with needed food, formula, and diapers. The tourney's fifth year took place on August 22, 2017.

=== 2013: Tippin' Point EP ===
In October 2013, Smith signed with Republic Nashville and released his first American single, "Tippin' Point". It was written by Brian Kelley and Tyler Hubbard of Florida Georgia Line with Jaren Johnston. In 2013, Smith was nominated for Male Artist of the Year, Single of the Year and Album of the Year by the Canadian Country Music Association. Smith performed on the CCMA broadcast award ceremony, which took place on September 8, 2013.

Smith released an extended play, Tippin' Point, on March 4, 2014, in the US and Canada. Three singles have been released from the EP so far. The title track was a top five single on the Canadian country radio chart and was pronounced the fastest country single to be Gold certified by Music Canada. Since then, the single has been certified Platinum in Canada and the "Tippin' Point" video was ranked number one on CMT Canada. In the US, the song "Tippin' Point" was ranked number one on Sirius XM's The Highway Hot 45 Countdown and has sold over 120,000 singles. Smith followed up the success of the first single by releasing "Slow Rollin'" in March 2014. The track was a top five single at Canadian country radio. A third single, "A Girl Like You", was released in June 2014.

Smith's single "Slow Rollin'" is performed by Lady Antebellum on the deluxe edition of their album 747.

=== 2014–2017: Lifted and Side Effects ===
In 2014, Smith entered a recording studio in Nashville to record his second full-length studio album with producer Joey Moi. The album, Lifted, was released on November 25, 2014. Smith released the first single off the album, "Wastin' Gas", on October 28, 2014, followed by album's lead track "Lifted" and finally "Cheap Seats". "Wastin' Gas" became Smith's first number one Canada Country hit, as well as his first charting entry on the Billboard Country Digital Songs and Country Indicator airplay charts in the United States.

In 2016, Smith released his third solo album Side Effects. The singles released from the album included "Kids with Cars", "One Little Kiss", "Autograph", lead title track "Side Effects" and "Sky Stays This Blue". In September 2016, Smith also joined Keith Urban for the Canadian leg of his Ripcord World Tour.

=== 2018–2020: The Fall EP and Timeless ===
In March 2019, Smith released his EP The Fall. The EP featured four straight number one singles, "Make 'Em Like You", "Rhinestone World", "Drop", and "Timeless". Smith co-headlined the Friends Don't Let Friends Tour Alone Tour with Dean Brody across Canada in the fall of 2020.

In July 2020, a Nielsen Music study found Smith to be the sixth-highest played Canadian artist on domestic radio in the first half of 2020, ahead of Drake and Chad Brownlee, and slightly behind Virginia to Vegas and Justin Bieber.

Smith's fourth studio album, Timeless was released on August 28, 2020, and contains all previously released material from The Fall, as well as the singles, "Like a Man" and "Some Things Never Change". In November 2020, Smith released his first Christmas single "Classic".

=== 2021–present: Self-titled album, Some Things Never Change Tour, Unplugged Tour ===
In August 2021, Smith signed a global recording deal with Big Loud Records. Along with Big Loud, and producer Scott Cooke, Smith launched the joint venture Local Hay Records which signed Shawn Austin as their flagship artist. In September 2021, Smith hosted and headlined the "Lifted Hotel Festival" in Vancouver, British Columbia, with all proceeds from the event going towards his organization, the Lifted Dallas Smith Charitable Foundation which supports mental health. Other featured performers included Austin, Jojo Mason, Andrew Hyatt, and Kelly Prescott. In November 2021, Smith announced his headlining Some Things Never Change Tour, which ran in early 2022 and included James Barker Band, Meghan Patrick, Jojo Mason, and Shawn Austin among the opening acts.

Smith released "Hide from a Broken Heart" as his first global single on Big Loud on November 29, 2021. Smith debuted the song at the 2021 Canadian Country Music Awards that day, where he won Entertainer of the Year, Male Artist of the Year, Single of the Year for "Like a Man", and best selling Canadian album for Timeless. He then featured on the Josh Ramsay single "Best of Me" in February 2022. In June 2022, Smith released the single "One Too" with fellow Canadian country singer MacKenzie Porter. He was subsequently named Male Artist of the Year and won the Fans' Choice at the 2022 Canadian Country Music Awards. In January 2023, Smith released the single "Singing in a Beer". The song was included on his self-titled fifth studio album Dallas Smith, which was released on October 27, 2023. Smith released two instant gratification tracks "Fixer Upper" and "CRZY" alongside the opening of pre-orders for his self-titled album. The album's first track, "Use Me", became its fifth single to Canadian country radio, and was released to radio formats in Australia and the United Kingdom as well.

In October 2023, it was announced that Smith would take his first acting role, appearing alongside Allan Hawco and Charlie Gillespie in Soul's Road, the debut film of music video director Joel Stewart. In the fall of 2025, Smith embarked on a 52-date "Unplugged" Tour across Canada, with support from opening act Brock Phillips. In November 2025, Smith joined Canadian R&B singer Shawn Desman on the song "One Good Life".

In 2026, Smith released his first solo single in three years, "Good Time Goes".

== Personal life ==
Smith married his longtime girlfriend Kristen in 2012 and the couple has two daughters together. He also has a son from a previous relationship.

== Discography ==
- Jumped Right In (2012)
- Lifted (2014)
- Side Effects (2016)
- Timeless (2020)
- Dallas Smith (2023)

== Awards and nominations ==
Year	Association	Category	Nominated work	Result
2012	Canadian Country Music Awards	Rising Star Award	—N/a	Nominated
2012	Canadian Country Music Awards	Single of the Year	"Somebody Somewhere"	Nominated
2012	British Columbia Country Music Association Awards	Video of the Year	"Somebody Somewhere"	Won
2012	British Columbia Country Music Association Awards	Entertainer of the Year	—N/a	Nominated
2012	British Columbia Country Music Association Awards	Album of the Year	Jumped Right In	Nominated
2012	British Columbia Country Music Association Awards	Single of the Year	"Somebody Somewhere"	Nominated
2012	British Columbia Country Music Association Awards	Fans Choice Award	—N/a	Nominated
2012	British Columbia Country Music Association Awards	Male Vocalist of the Year	—N/a	Nominated
2013	Juno Awards	Country Album of the Year	Jumped Right In	Nominated
2013	Canadian Music Week Radio Awards	Best New Country Solo Artist	—N/a	Won
2013	Sirius XM Indie Award	Country Artist of the Year	—N/a	Won
2013	Canadian Country Music Awards	Male Artist of the Year	—N/a	Nominated
2013	Canadian Country Music Awards	Single of the Year	"Jumped Right In"	Nominated
2013	Canadian Country Music Awards	Album of the Year	Jumped Right In	Nominated
2014	Canadian Country Music Awards	Male Artist of the Year	—N/a	Nominated
2014	Canadian Country Music Awards	Single of the Year	"Tippin' Point"	Nominated
2014	Canadian Country Music Awards	Album of the Year	Tippin' Point EP	Nominated
2014	British Columbia Country Music Association	Album of the Year	Tippin' Point	Won
2014	British Columbia Country Music Association	Entertainer of the Year	—N/a	Won
2014	British Columbia Country Music Association	Fans Choice Award	—N/a	Nominated
2014	British Columbia Country Music Association	Male Vocalist of the Year	—N/a	Won
2014	British Columbia Country Music Association	Single of the Year	"Tippin' Point"	Won
2014	British Columbia Country Music Association	Video of the Year	"Tippin' Point"	Nominated
2015	Juno Awards	Country Album of the Year	Lifted	Won
2015	British Columbia Country Music Association	Album of the Year	Lifted	Won
2015	British Columbia Country Music Association	Entertainer of the Year	—N/a	Won
2015	British Columbia Country Music Association	Fans Choice Award	—N/a	Won
2015	British Columbia Country Music Association	Male Vocalist of the Year	—N/a	Won
2015	British Columbia Country Music Association	Single of the Year	"Wastin' Gas"	Won
2015	British Columbia Country Music Association	Video of the Year	"Lifted"	Nominated
2015	Canadian Country Music Awards	Fans' Choice Award	—N/a	Nominated
2015	Canadian Country Music Awards	Male Artist of the Year	—N/a	Nominated
2015	Canadian Country Music Awards	Single of the Year	"Wastin' Gas"	Nominated
2015	Canadian Country Music Awards	Album of the Year	Lifted	Won
2016	Canadian Country Music Awards	Fans' Choice Award	—N/a	Nominated
2016	Canadian Country Music Awards	Male Artist of the Year	—N/a	Nominated
2016	Canadian Country Music Awards	Single of the Year	"Cheap Seats"	Nominated
2016	Canadian Country Music Awards	Interactive Artist of the Year	—N/a	Nominated
2016	British Columbia Country Music Association	Entertainer of the Year	—N/a	Won
2016	British Columbia Country Music Association	Fans Choice Award	—N/a	Nominated
2016	British Columbia Country Music Association	Male Vocalist of the Year	—N/a	Nominated
2016	British Columbia Country Music Association	Single of the Year Award	"One Little Kiss"	Nominated
2016	British Columbia Country Music Association	Video of the Year	"One Little Kiss"	Nominated
2017	Juno Awards	Country Album of the Year	Side Effects	Nominated
2017	Canadian Country Music Awards	Fans' Choice Award	—N/a	Nominated
2017	Canadian Country Music Awards	Male Artist of the Year	—N/a	Nominated
2017	Canadian Country Music Awards	Album of the Year	Side Effects	Won
2017	Canadian Country Music Awards	Single of the Year	"Autograph"	Won
2018	Canadian Country Music Awards	Male Artist of the Year	—N/a	Won
2018	Canadian Country Music Awards	Fans' Choice Award	—N/a	Nominated
2018	Canadian Country Music Awards	Single of the Year	"Side Effects"	Nominated
2018	Canadian Country Music Awards	Video of the Year	"Sky Stays This Blue"	Won
2019	Canadian Country Music Awards	Male Artist of the Year	—N/a	Won
2019	Canadian Country Music Awards	Entertainer of the Year	—N/a	Won
2019	Canadian Country Music Awards	Album of the Year	The Fall	Nominated
2019	Canadian Country Music Awards	Fans' Choice Award	—N/a	Nominated
2020	Juno Awards	Country Album of the Year	The Fall	Nominated
2020	Canadian Country Music Awards	Male Artist of the Year	—N/a	Nominated
2020	Canadian Country Music Awards	Entertainer of the Year	—N/a	Won
2020	Canadian Country Music Awards	Single of the Year	"Drop"	Nominated
2020	Canadian Country Music Awards	Fans' Choice Award	—N/a	Nominated
2021	Juno Awards of 2021	Country Album of the Year	Timeless	Nominated
2021	2021 Canadian Country Music Awards	Album of the Year	Timeless	Nominated
2021	2021 Canadian Country Music Awards	Male Artist of the Year	—N/a	Won
2021	2021 Canadian Country Music Awards	Entertainer of the Year	—N/a	Won
2021	2021 Canadian Country Music Awards	Single of the Year	"Like a Man"	Won
2021	2021 Canadian Country Music Awards	Fans' Choice Award	—N/a	Nominated
2022	Canadian Country Music Association	Entertainer of the Year	—N/a	Nominated
2022	Canadian Country Music Association	Fans' Choice	—N/a	Won
2022	Canadian Country Music Association	Male Artist of the Year	—N/a	Won
2022	Country Music Association Awards	Global Country Artist Award	—N/a	Nominated
2023	Canadian Country Music Association	Entertainer of the Year	—N/a	Nominated
2023	Canadian Country Music Association	Fans' Choice	—N/a	Nominated
2023	Canadian Country Music Association	Male Artist of the Year	—N/a	Nominated
2023	Canadian Country Music Association	Musical Collaboration of the Year	"One Too" (with MacKenzie Porter)	Won
2023	Canadian Country Music Association	Video of the Year	"One Too" (with MacKenzie Porter)	Nominated
2024	Canadian Country Music Association	Album of the Year	Dallas Smith	Nominated
2024	Canadian Country Music Association	Fans' Choice	—N/a	Nominated
2024	Canadian Country Music Association	Male Artist of the Year	—N/a	Nominated
2024	Canadian Country Music Association	Musical Collaboration of the Year	"Day After Day" (with Shawn Austin)	Nominated
2025	Juno Awards	Country Album of the Year	Dallas Smith	Nominated
2025	Canadian Country Music Association	Fans' Choice	—N/a	Nominated
