= Joey Moi =

Canadian record producer

- Born: August 9, 1975 (age 51); Whitehorse, Yukon, Canada
- Genres: Country, rock
- Occupations: Audio engineer, record producer, songwriter
- Years active: 2001–present
- Website: Official website

Joey Moi (born August 9, 1975) is a Canadian record producer, audio engineer, mixer, songwriter, and musician. He is known for his work with the rock groups Nickelback and My Darkest Days, and country music acts Chris Lane, Dallas Smith, Florida Georgia Line, Jake Owen, Morgan Wallen, and Hardy.

== Biography ==
Joey Moi was born on August 9, 1975 in Whitehorse, Yukon, spending his first three years in Dawson City before moving to Gambier Island, British Columbia in 1979, then to Tumbler Ridge when he was ten. After graduating from Tumbler Ridge Secondary School, he moved to Vancouver, to attend the Audio Engineering program at the Centre for Digital Imaging and Sound (CDIS).

While attending engineering school at the Centre for Digital Imaging and Sound (now The Art Institute of Vancouver) in Vancouver, Moi began working with Nickelback on demos. He is the Joey referred to in the Nickelback song Photograph.

== Career ==
In the early 2000s, Moi became known for his work with Nickelback. His association with the band began with their album The Long Road.

In 2010, Moi signed a publishing deal with Big Loud Shirt Publishing and made the move to Nashville and began working with Jake Owen on his single, “Barefoot Blue Jean Night” – a 2× Platinum-certified hit and Owen's first #1 single. He went on to produce Owen's Platinum-certified Barefoot Blue Jean Night album and his 2013 follow up, Days of Gold. In 2018, the two rekindled their creative partnership on “I Was Jack (You Were Diane)”, which became Platinum-certified and Owen's seventh Billboard Country #1.

Moi formed a partnership in 2011 with Big Loud Shirt founder Craig Wiseman, Kevin “Chief" Zaruk, and Seth England to establish the publishing company Big Loud Mountain.

Big Loud Mountain's first client was Florida Georgia Line. Moi has produced Florida Georgia Line's entire discography, including studio albums: Here’s To The Good Times (2× Platinum-certified), Anything Goes (Platinum-certified), Dig Your Roots (Platinum-certified), and Can’t Say I Ain’t Country (Gold-certified). Florida Georgia Line's Moi-produced catalog has exceeded more than 8 Billion digital streams worldwide, selling more than 32 Million tracks and over 4 Million albums.

In 2015, Moi and his Big Loud partners founded Big Loud, an independent record label. Acts on this label have included Chris Lane, Hardy, Jake Owen, and Morgan Wallen, all of whom have had their Big Loud albums produced by Moi as well.

In 2020, Moi broke a Billboard record after spending 42 weeks as #1 on the Country Producers Chart. He held the top spot due to 13 production credits on the Hot Country Songs Chart. 12 of these credits originated from Morgan Wallen’s Platinum-certified Dangerous: The Double Album. This Moi produced album went on to break another record as the only country album to spend more than six weeks at No. 1 on the Billboard 200.

Moi has won multiple awards including the Country Music Association’s Single of the Year for “Cruise”, the Academy of Country Music’s Single of the Year (“H.O.L.Y.”) and Vocal Event of the Year (“This Is How We Roll” and “May We All”), and multiple Canadian Country Music Association honors. He was named the Top Hot Country Songs Producer of 2013 by Billboard and was toasted again as one of Billboard Magazine’s Top Country Producers of 2019. Joey has been named one of Billboard Magazine’s Top Country Producers.

== Credits ==
=== Albums ===
Year	Artist	Album	Certification	Role							
Year	Artist	Album	Certification	Keys	Mixing	Percussion	Production	Programming	Songwriting	Strings	Vocals
2003	Nickelback	The Long Road	3× Platinum				✓				
2005	Nickelback	All the Right Reasons	Diamond				✓				
2008	Nickelback	Dark Horse	3× Platinum		✓		✓				
2009	Faber Drive	Can't Keep a Secret			✓						
2010	My Darkest Days	My Darkest Days		✓	✓	✓	✓		"Porn Star Dancing"	✓	✓
2011	Jake Owen	Barefoot Blue Jean Night			✓		✓	✓			
2011	Nickelback	Here and Now	Platinum				✓		"Bottoms Up", "When We Stand Together"		
2012	Dallas Smith	Jumped Right In					✓		"And Then Some", "Nothing but Summer", "What Kinda Love",		
2012	Florida Georgia Line	Here's to the Good Times	2× Platinum		✓		✓	✓	"Cruise", "Stay"		✓
2012	Florida Georgia Line	It'z Just What We Do (EP)					✓		"Cruise"		
2012	Jake Owen	Endless Summer (EP)					✓				
2012	My Darkest Days	Sick and Twisted Affair		✓	✓		✓	✓	"All but "Love Crime", "Stutter"	✓	✓
2013	Jake Owen	Days of Gold			✓	✓	✓	✓		✓	✓
2014	Dallas Smith	Lifted					✓				
2014	Dallas Smith	Tippin' Point					✓				
2014	Florida Georgia Line	Anything Goes	Platinum		✓	✓	✓	✓			✓
2016	Chris Lane	Girl Problems					✓				
2016	Dallas Smith	Side Effects					✓			✓	✓
2016	Florida Georgia Line	Dig Your Roots	Platinum		✓	✓	✓	✓			✓
2018	Chris Lane	Laps Around The Sun					✓				
2018	Hardy	This Ole Boy			✓		✓	✓			
2018	Mason Ramsey	Famous (EP)					✓				
2018	Morgan Wallen	If I Know Me	3× platinum				✓	✓		✓	✓
2019	Dallas Smith	The Fall			✓		✓				
2019	Ernest	Locals Only			✓		✓				
2019	Florida Georgia Line	Can't Say I Ain't Country			✓		✓				
2019	Hardy	Where To Find Me			✓		✓	✓		✓	
2019	Hixtape	Hixtape Vol. 1			✓		✓				
2019	Jake Owen	Greetings From... Jake			✓		✓				
2019	Larry Fleet	Workin' Hard			✓		✓				
2019	Madison Kozak	Heartbreak School (EP)			✓		✓				
2019	Mason Ramsey	Twang			✓		✓				
2020	Dallas Smith	Timeless			✓		✓		"Drop"		
2020	Hardy	A Rock			✓		✓				
2020	MacKenzie Porter	Drinkin' Songs: The Collection (EP)			✓	✓	✓				
2021	Hixtape	Hixtape: Vol. 2			✓		✓				
2021	Larry Fleet	Stack of Records			✓		✓				
2021	Lily Rose	Stronger Than I Am			✓		✓				
2021	Lily Rose	Stronger Than I Am (Repack)			✓		✓				
2021	Morgan Wallen	Dangerous: The Double Album	6× platinum		✓		✓	✓			✓
2023	Ben Burgess	Tears the Size of Texas			✓		✓				
2023	Dallas Smith	Dallas Smith			✓		✓				
2023	ERNEST	FLOWER SHOPS (THE ALBUM): Two Dozen Roses			✓		✓				
2023	Griffen Palmer	Unlearn			✓		✓	"By The Way", "Small Town After All"			
2023	HARDY	the mockingbird & THE CROW			✓	"drink one for me"	✓			"I AIN'T IN THE COUNTRY NO MORE", "JACK", "SOLD OUT", "TRUCK BED",	"drink one for me", "red (feat. Morgan Wallen)"
2023	Jake Owen	Loose Cannon			✓		✓				
2023	Jake Worthington	Jake Worthington			✓		✓				
2023	Larry Fleet	Earned It			✓		✓				
2023	Morgan Wallen	One Thing at a Time			✓		✓				

=== Singles and tracks ===
Year	Artist	Single / Track	Certification	Role						
Year	Artist	Single / Track	Certification	Mixing	Percussion	Production	Programming	Songwriting	Strings	Vocals
2005	Hinder	By the Way						✓		
2005	Hinder	Get Stoned						✓		
2005	Hinder	How Long						✓		
2008	Daughtry	Life After You						✓		
2011	Black Stone Cherry	All I'm Dreamin' Of						✓		
2011	Black Stone Cherry	Stay						✓		
2011	Kimberly Caldwell	Heart Like Mine						✓		
2012	Florida Georgia Line	Dayum, Baby	Gold	✓		✓			✓	
2012	Florida Georgia Line	Here's To The Good Times	Gold	✓		✓	✓			✓
2012	Florida Georgia Line	Round here	2× Platinum	✓		✓	✓			✓
2012	Florida Georgia Line	Stay	2× Platinum	✓		✓	✓	✓		✓
2012	Florida Georgia Line	This is How We Roll	5× Platinum	✓		✓	✓			✓
2012	Florida Georgia Line	Cruise	Diamond & 11× Platinum	✓		✓	✓	✓		✓
2012	Florida Georgia Line	Get Your Shine On	3× Platinum	✓		✓	✓			✓
2012	Florida Georgia Line	Tell Me How You Like It	Gold	✓		✓	✓			✓
2013	Small Town Pistols	Colour Blind						✓		
2013	Florida Georgia Line	I'm in a Hurry (And Don't Know Why)				✓				
2014	Florida Georgia Line	Anything Goes	Platinum	✓	✓	✓	✓			✓
2014	Florida Georgia Line	Confession	Platinum	✓	✓	✓	✓			✓
2014	Florida Georgia Line	Dirt	2× Platinum	✓	✓	✓	✓			✓
2014	Florida Georgia Line	Sippin' on Fire	Platinum	✓	✓	✓	✓			✓
2014	Florida Georgia Line	Sun Daze	Platinum	✓	✓	✓	✓			✓
2014	Florida Georgia Line	If I Die Tomorrow				✓				
2015	RaeLynn	Always Sing				✓				
2015	RaeLynn	For a Boy				✓				
2015	RaeLynn	God Made Girls				✓				
2015	RaeLynn	Kissin' Frogs				✓				
2015	Three Days Grace	Fallen Angel						✓		
2016	Chris Lane	Cool				✓				
2016	Chris Lane	Drinkin' Games				✓				
2016	Chris Lane	Stolen Car				✓				
2016	Florida Georgia Line	God, Your Mama, And Me	Platinum	✓	✓	✓	✓			✓
2016	Florida Georgia Line	H.O.L.Y.	4× Platinum	✓	✓	✓	✓			✓
2016	Florida Georgia Line	May We All (feat. Tim McGraw)	2× Platinum	✓	✓	✓	✓			✓
2016	Florida Georgia Line	Smooth	Gold	✓	✓	✓	✓			✓
2017	RaeLynn	Your Heart				✓				
2018	Chris Lane	One Girl				✓				
2018	Dallas Smith	Make 'Em Like You				✓				
2018	Dallas Smith	Rhinestone World				✓				✓
2018	Florida Georgia Line	Colorado		✓		✓	✓		✓	
2018	Florida Georgia Line	People Are Different		✓		✓	✓			✓
2018	Florida Georgia Line	Simple	Platinum	✓		✓			✓	
2018	Florida Georgia Line	Sittin' Pretty		✓		✓	✓			
2018	Florida Georgia Line	Talk You Out of It		✓		✓	✓		✓	
2018	Jake Owen	Catch A Cold One		✓		✓	✓			
2018	Jake Owen	Down to the Honkytonk		✓		✓	✓			✓
2018	Jake Owen	I Was Jack (You Were Diane)		✓		✓	✓			✓
2018	Jake Owen	Made For You		✓		✓	✓			✓
2018	Jake Owen	Something To Ride To		✓		✓				
2018	MacKenzie Porter	About You		✓		✓				
2018	MacKenzie Porter	Drive Thru		✓		✓				
2018	Mason Ramsey	Famous				✓				
2018	Mason Ramsey	White Christmas				✓				
2019	MacKenzie Porter	These Days		✓		✓				
2019	Madison Kozak	Click		✓		✓				
2019	Madison Kozak	First Last Name		✓		✓				
2019	Madison Kozak	Household		✓		✓				
2019	Madison Kozak	OMG ILY		✓		✓				
2019	Sean Stemaly	Back On A Backroad		✓		✓				
2019	Sean Stemaly	Last Night All Day		✓		✓				
2019	Morgan Wallen	Cover Me Up		✓		✓				
2019	Morgan Wallen	This Bar		✓		✓				
2020	Ashland Craft	Two Wildflowers and a Box of Wine		✓		✓				
2020	Blame My Youth	Dance With My Demons		✓		✓				
2020	Blame My Youth	Fantastic		✓		✓				
2020	Blame My Youth	Right Where You Belong		✓		✓				
2020	Ernest	Cheers		✓		✓				
2020	Gryffin, Chris Lane	Hold You Tonight				✓				
2020	Hardy	Boots				✓				
2020	Keith Urban	Polaroid				✓				
2020	Larry Fleet	Where I Find God		✓		✓				
2020	MacKenzie Porter	Seeing Other People		✓		✓				
2020	MacKenzie Porter	These Days (Remix)		✓		✓				
2020	Morgan Wallen	More Than My Hometown		✓		✓				
2020	Sean Stemaly	As Far As I Know		✓		✓				
2020	Sean Stemaly	Come Back to Bed		✓		✓				
2021	Blame My Youth	Go To Sleep		✓		✓				
2021	Blame My Youth	Feel It In The Morning		✓		✓				
2021	Blame My Youth	Okay With It		✓		✓				
2021	Blame My Youth	Tentacles		✓		✓				
2021	Chris Lane	Ain’t Even Met You Yet		✓		✓				
2021	Chris Lane	Fill Them Boots		✓		✓				
2021	Chris Lane	Stop Coming Over		✓		✓				
2021	Chris Lane	Summer Job Money		✓		✓				
2021	Chris Lane	That's What Mamas Are For		✓		✓				
2021	Dallas Smith	Hide From A Broken Heart		✓		✓				
2021	ERNEST	Flower Shops (feat. Morgan Wallen)		✓		✓				
2021	Hardy	Blurry		✓		✓				
2021	Jake Owen	Best Thing Since Backroads		✓		✓				
2021	Jake Owen	Drunk On A Boat		✓		✓				
2021	Lily Rose	I Don't Smoke		✓		✓				
2021	Lily Rose	Know My Way Around		✓		✓				
2021	Lily Rose	Overnight Sensation		✓		✓				
2021	Lily Rose	Remind Me of You		✓		✓				
2021	Lily Rose	Villain (band mix)		✓		✓				
2021	MacKenzie Porter	Coming Soon To A Bar Near You		✓		✓				
2021	MacKenzie Porter	Heaven Heard Me		✓		✓				
2021	MacKenzie Porter	Pickup		✓		✓				
2021	MacKenzie Porter	Unlonely Me		✓		✓				
2021	Sean Stemaly	Come Back to Bed (acoustic)		✓		✓				
2021	Sean Stemaly	Hello, You Up		✓		✓				
2022	HARDY	here lies country music				✓				
2022	HARDY	JACK				✓				
2022	HARDY	SOLD OUT				✓				
2022	HARDY	the mockingbird & THE CROW				✓				
2022	HARDY	TRUCK BED				✓				
2022	HARDY	wait in the truck (feat. Lainey Wilson)				✓				
2022	Sean Stemaly	Product Of A Small Town		✓		✓				
2023	Blame My Youth	The Break		✓		✓	✓		✓	✓
2023	Dallas Smith	Fixer Upper				✓				
2023	Dallas Smith, MacKenzie Porter	One Too		✓		✓				
2023	ERNEST	Kiss of Death		✓		✓				
2023	ERNEST, David Lee Murphy, HIXTAPE	Red Dirt Clouds		✓		✓				
2023	ERNEST	Slow Dancing In A Burning Room (Studio Version)		✓		✓				
2023	ERNEST	Sucker For Small Towns		✓		✓				
2023	ERNEST	Takes After You		✓		✓				
2023	ERNEST	What Have I Got To Lose (feat. Dean Dillon)		✓		✓				
2023	Griffen Palmer	25 To Life		✓		✓				
2023	Griffen Palmer	Heart Of Exes		✓		✓				
2023	Griffen Palmer	Second Guessing		✓		✓				
2023	Griffen Palmer	Unlearn		✓		✓				
2023	HARDY	UNAPOLOGETICALLY COUNTRY AS HELL		✓		✓			✓	
2023	HIXTAPE, Larry Fleet	In Love With My Problems (feat. Jon Pardi)		✓		✓				
2023	Jake Owen	Drink All Day		✓		✓	✓			
2023	Jake Owen	Hot Truck Beer				✓				
2023	Jake Owen	My Boots Miss Yours		✓		✓				
2023	Jake Owen	Nothing				✓				
2023	Jake Owen	On The Boat Again				✓				
2023	Jake Owen	Solo Solo				✓				
2023	Jake Worthington	Next New Thing		✓		✓				
2023	Jake Worthington	State You Left Me In		✓		✓				
2023	Lauren Watkins	Cowboys On Music Row (feat. Carter Faith)		✓		✓				
2023	Lauren Watkins	Introducing: Lauren Watkins		✓		✓				
2023	Lauren Watkins	Introducing: The Heartbreak		✓		✓				
2023	MacKenzie Porter	Bet You Break My Heart				✓				
2023	MacKenzie Porter	Chasing Tornadoes		✓		✓				
2024	Brooks & Dunn	Hillbilly Deluxe (feat. HARDY)				✓				
2024	HARDY	ROCKSTAR				✓				
2024	Morgan Wallen	Everything I Love				✓				
2024	Morgan Wallen	Lies Lies Lies				✓				
2024	Morgan Wallen	Spin You Around				✓				

== Awards and nominations ==
Year	Organization	Award	Project	Result
2011	SOCAN	#1 Song	Daughtry – Life After You	Won
2011	SOCAN	#1 Song	Nickelback – Gotta Be Somebody	Won
2011	SOCAN	#1 Song	Nickelback – Something In Your Mouth	Won
2011	SOCAN	#1 Song	Nickelback – When We Stand Together	Won
2013	Billboard Music Awards	Top Hot Country Songs Producer	Best of 2013: The Year In Music	Won
2013	Country Music Association Awards	Song of the Year	Florida Georgia Line – Cruise	Won
2014	Canadian Country Music Awards	Producer of the Year	Dallas Smith – Tippin' Point EP	Won
2014	SOCAN	Pop/Rock Award	Nickelback – When We Stand Together	Won
2015	Canadian Country Music Awards	Producer of the Year	Dallas Smith – Lifted	Won
2017	Academy of Country Music	Single of the Year	Florida Georgia Line - H.O.L.Y.	Won
2017	Academy of Country Music	Vocal Event of Year	Florida Georgia Line - May We All	Won
2020	Canadian Country Music Awards	ACM Studio Recording Awards	Producer of the Year	Nominated
2020	Canadian Country Music Awards	Record Producer of the Year	Mackenzie Porter - These Days	Nominated
2021	Academy of Country Music	Music Event of the Year	HARDY (feat. Lauren Alaina & Devin Dawson) - One Beer	Nominated
2021	Academy of Country Music	Studio Recording Award / Producer of the Year		Nominated
2021	Canadian Country Music Awards	Record Producer of the Year	Dallas Smith - Timeless	Nominated
2021	Country Music Association Awards	Album of the Year (Mix Engineer)	Morgan Wallen - Dangerous: The Double Album	Nominated
2021	Country Music Association Awards	Album of the Year (Producer)	Morgan Wallen - Dangerous: The Double Album	Nominated
2021	MusicRow	Producer of the Year	Chris Lane, Ernest, Hardy, Jake Owen, Keith Urban, Larry Fleet, Lily Rose, MacKenzie Porter, Morgan Wallen, and Sean Stemaly	Nominated
2022	Academy of Country Music	Album of the Year	Morgan Wallen - Dangerous: The Double Album	Won
2022	Academy of Country Music	Album of the Year	Famous Friends	Nominated
2022	Academy of Country Music	Studio Recording Award / Product of the Year		Nominated
2022	Canadian Country Music Awards	Record Producer of the Year	Dallas Smith - Hide from a Broken Heart	Won
2022	MusicRow	Producer of the Year		Nominated
2023	Academy of Country Music	Music Event of the Year	HARDY (feat. Lainey Wilson) - wait in the truck	Won
2023	Academy of Country Music	Studio Recording Award / Producer of the Year		Nominated
2023	Billboard	Hot 100 Producer of the Year		Won
2023	Canadian Country Music Awards	Record Producer of the Year	Dallas Smith (feat. MacKenzie Porter) - One Too	Nominated
2023	Country Music Association Awards	Album of the Year (Mix Engineer)	Morgan Wallen - One Thing at a Time	Nominated
2023	Country Music Association Awards	Album of the Year (Producer)	Morgan Wallen - One Thing at a Time	Nominated
2023	Country Music Association Awards	Musical Event of the Year (Producer)	HARDY (feat. Lainey Wilson) - wait in the truck	Won
2023	Country Music Association Awards	Single of the Year (Mix Engineer)	HARDY (feat. Lainey Wilson) - wait in the truck	Nominated
2023	Country Music Association Awards	Single of the Year (Producer)	HARDY (feat. Lainey Wilson) - wait in the truck	Nominated
2023	MusicRow	Producer of the Year		Won
2024	Canadian Country Music Association Awards	Record Producer of the Year	Dallas Smith - Dallas Smith; Morgan Wallen - One Thing at a Time	Won
2025	Canadian Country Music Association Awards	Record Producer of the Year	Hardy - Quit!!	Won
