= 604 Records =

Canadian record label

- Founded: 2001; 25 years ago
- Founder: Chad Kroeger; Jonathan Simkin
- Distributor: Warner Music Canada
- Genre: Post-grunge; pop rock; dance-pop; country
- Country of origin: Canada
- Location: Vancouver, British Columbia; Toronto, Ontario
- Official website: 604records.com

604 Records (stylized as VIOIV Records) is a music production company. It is named after area code 604 of the Lower Mainland, where the company's offices are located.

== History ==
The company was co-founded by Nickelback lead singer Chad Kroeger and attorney Jonathan Simkin, founder of Simkin Artist Management, in 2001, and launched in 2002. Their records are distributed in Canada by Warner Music Group.

Simkin launched the companion label Light Organ Records in 2010 to release music by indie rock bands who he felt did not fit with 604's image.

In 2014, mainly due to the revenue from the success of Carly Rae Jepsen's Call Me Maybe, 604 Records relocated to a larger office and opened 604 Studios, a multimedia production facility featuring two recording studios, soundstage and in-house production team.

In March 2022, the company announced plans to launch an NFT platform.

== Notable artists currently represented ==
- Alli Walker
- Andrew Hyatt
- Carly Rae Jepsen
- Coleman Hell
- Dirty Radio
- Fionn
- JoJo Mason
- Josh Ramsay
- Marianas Trench
- The Jins
- Mitch Zorn
- Shawn Austin

== Notable artists formerly represented ==
- Dallas Smith
- Daniel Wesley
- Faber Drive
- Jakalope
- Jessie Farrell
- My Darkest Days
- One Bad Son
- Ralph
- Small Town Pistols
- Suzie McNeil
- The Suits XL
- Theory of a Deadman
- Thornley
- Tommy Lee

== See also ==
- List of record labels
