= Fame (ship) =

Numerous vessels have borne the name Fame:

- Fame (1779 ship) was built at Bristol as a West Indiaman. Between 1797 and 1799 she made two voyages to India for the British East India Company (EIC). She then made two voyages to Africa as a slave ship. On her return from Africa she resumed her trading with Jamaica. She is last listed in Lloyd's Register in 1807.
- Fame (1786 ship) was launched in India. She was sold to Portuguese owners. A French privateer captured but the Royal Navy and Spanish Real Armada recaptured her in 1794. She then became a West Indiaman, sailing from Liverpool. Between 1796 and 1804 she made three voyages as a slave ship. She then returned to the West Indies trade. From 1818 on she was a whaler in the Greenland whale fishery, sailing from Whitby and then Hull. She burnt in 1823 while outward bound on a whaling voyage.
- Fame (1801 ship) was launched at Bristol and made two voyages for the EIC. On her third voyage a French frigate captured her. She apparently returned to British hands and was last listed in 1811.
- Fame (1803 ship) was built at Calcutta; on 27 July 1807 she was lost on the Eastern Sea Reef.
- Fame (1812 ship) was built at Quebec and was lost in 1817 after having transported convicts to New South Wales.
- Fame (1815 ship) of 204, or 205 tons (bm), was built at Quebec by John Goodie. She traded widely and was last listed in 1833.
- Fame (1816 ship) was built in 1816 at Calcutta. She traded between Britain and India and was wrecked in 1822.
- Fame (1818 ship) was built at Northfleet in 1818. She made one voyage under charter to the EIC; a fire destroyed her in 1824 during her second voyage for the EIC.

== See also ==
- HMS Fame – one of nine ships of the Royal Navy to bear the name
