= Famous =

Famous may refer to:

== Companies ==
- Famous Brands, a South African restaurant franchisor
- Famous Footwear, an American retail store chain
- Famous Music, the music publishing division of Paramount Pictures
- Famous Studios, the animation division of Paramount Pictures from 1942 to 1967

== Music ==
- Famous (rapper), Canadian rapper and radio broadcaster

=== Albums ===
- Famous (Marques Houston album) or the title song, 2013
- Famous (Puddle of Mudd album) or the title song (see below), 2007
- Famous (Super Deluxe album) or the title song, 1995
- Famous, by Dalvin DeGrate, 2023
- Famous?, by Jme, 2008
- Famous (single album), by AllDay Project, 2025

=== EPs ===
- Famous (Taemin EP) or the title song, 2019
- Famous, by Mason Ramsey, or the title song (see below), 2018

=== Songs ===
- "Famous" (Charli XCX song), 2015
- "Famous" (Kanye West song), 2016
- "Famous" (Mason Ramsey song), 2018
- "Famous" (Nathan Sykes song), 2016
- "Famous" (Play song), 2010; covered by Big Time Rush, 2010
- "Famous" (Puddle of Mudd song), 2007
- "Famous" (Tinchy Stryder song), 2010
- "Famous", by 21 Savage from Issa Album, 2017
- "Famous", by Bhad Bhabie from 15, 2018
- "Famous", by Bilal Hassani from Kingdom, 2019
- "Famous", by French Montana from Jungle Rules, 2017
- "Famous", by Inna from Party Never Ends, 2013
- "Famous", by Lady Antebellum from Heart Break, 2017
- "Famous", by Lil Wayne from Tha Carter V, 2018
- "Famous", by Octavian, Gunna and Saint Jhn, 2020
- "Famous", by Scouting for Girls from Everybody Wants to Be on TV, 2010
- "Famous", by Ty Dolla Sign from Beach House 3, 2017
- "Famous", by Zara Larsson from Poster Girl, 2021

== Other uses ==
- Charles W. Famous (1875–1938), American politician and physician
- Lisa Picard Is Famous, also known as Famous, a 2000 film
- Famous, Missouri, a community in the United States

== See also ==
- Fame (disambiguation)
- "Fame Us", a song by Rai Harrie and 7Bantai'Z from the 2026 Indian film Tu Yaa Main
