= List of shipwrecks in June 1840 =

The list of shipwrecks in June 1840 includes ships sunk, foundered, wrecked, grounded, or otherwise lost during June 1840.

== 1 June ==
List of shipwrecks: 1 June 1840
Ship	State	Description
Henry Smith	United Kingdom	The ship was holed by an anchor and sank in the River Boyne. She was on a voyage from Liverpool, Lancashire to Drogheda, County Louth. She was refloated on 3 June.
Maria Anna	Bremen	The ship sprang a leak and sank off Schiermonnikoog, Friesland, Netherlands. She was on a voyage from Leven, Fife, United Kingdom to the Weser.

== 2 June ==
List of shipwrecks: 2 June 1840
Ship	State	Description
Burnham	United Kingdom	The schooner was driven ashore and wrecked at Port d'Urban, Natalia Republic.
Clydesdale	United Kingdom	The ship struck the wreck of Sylphide (United Kingdom) in Liverpool Bay and was damaged. She was on a voyage from Liverpool, Lancashire to New South Wales. She consequently put back to Liverpool.
Eleanore	Stettin	The ship ran aground off Kronborg, Helsingør, Denmark. She was refloated the next day and resumed her voyage.
Zwillinge	Russia	The ship capsized off Hanstholm, Denmark.

== 3 June ==
List of shipwrecks: 3 June 1840
Ship	State	Description
Clyde	United Kingdom	The ship was destroyed by fire in the Strangford Lough.
Volo	United Kingdom	The ship was driven ashore in the Dardanelles. She was later refloated.

== 4 June ==
List of shipwrecks: 4 June 1840
Ship	State	Description
Anna Kersten	Hamburg	The ship was driven ashore at "Aarvah", Denmark. She was on a voyage from Altona to Ringkøbing.
Cheerly	United Kingdom	The ship was beached in Robin Hoods Bay and was wrecked.
Haabet	Denmark	The ship was driven ashore near "Sud Lynvig". She was on a voyage from Ringkøbing to Hamburg.
Henry Cotes	United Kingdom	The ship ran aground at Blyth, Northumberland.
Irene Helene	France	The ship was abandoned in the North Sea with the loss of a crew member. She was on a voyage from Boulougne, Pas-de-Calais to Mandal, Norway.
Marie	Hamburg	The ship was driven ashore near "Sud Lynvig". She was on a voyage from Hamburg to Randers, Denmark.

== 5 June ==
List of shipwrecks: 5 June 1840
Ship	State	Description
Helen	United Kingdom	The ship was wrecked on the "Graug Cautates". She was on a voyage from Halifax, Nova Scotia, British North America to Jamaica.
Wansford	United Kingdom	The ship was driven ashore near Varde, Denmark.Her crew were rescued. She was on a voyage from Hamburg to Ystad, Sweden.

== 6 June ==
List of shipwrecks: 6 June 1840
Ship	State	Description
Ant	United Kingdom	The ship ran aground on the Swilly Rocks, off the coast of Anglesey. She was on a voyage from Chester, Cheshire or Liverpool, Lancashire to Caernarfon.
Earl Grey	United Kingdom	The ship sank off Walney Island, Lancashire. She was refloated on 15 June and resumed her voyage.

== 7 June ==
List of shipwrecks: 7 June 1840
Ship	State	Description
Hope	Netherlands	The ship ran aground on the Kentish Knock. She was refloated but then ran aground on the Long Sand. She was on a voyage from Rotterdam, South Holland to New York, United States. Hope was refloated and put into Sheerness, Kent, United Kingdom.
John Carroll	United Kingdom	The ship ran aground off Ryde, Isle of Wight. She was on a voyage from Bridgwater, Somerset to King's Lynn, Norfolk. John Carroll was refloated and resumed her voyage.

== 8 June ==
List of shipwrecks: 8 June 1840
Ship	State	Description
Fortitude	United Kingdom	The brig foundered in the Bristol Channel 1.5 nautical miles (2.8 km) west of St. Govan's Head, Pembrokeshire with the loss of her seven crew. She was on a voyage from Saundersfoot, Pembrokeshire to Cork.
Zante Packet	United Kingdom	The ship ran aground on the Barber Sand, in the North Sea off the coast of Norfolk. She was on a voyage from Newcastle upon Tyne, Northumberland to Zante, United States of the Ionian Islands. Zante Packet was refloated and put into Great Yarmouth, Norfolk.

== 9 June ==
List of shipwrecks: 9 June 1840
Ship	State	Description
Minerva	United Kingdom	The ship ran aground at Pembrey, Carmarthenshire. She was on a voyage from Pembrey to Sunderland, County Durham. Minerva was refloated and put back to Pembrey.

== 10 June ==
List of shipwrecks: 10 June 1840
Ship	State	Description
Mary Ann	United Kingdom	The ship ran aground 10 nautical miles (19 km) south east of Ekholmen, Sweden. She was refloated the next day and resumed her voyage to Saint Petersburg, Russia.
Millicent	United Kingdom	The ship was driven ashore near "Machios", New Brunswick, British North America. She was on a voyage from Hull, Yorkshire to St. Andrews, New Brunswick.

== 11 June ==
List of shipwrecks: 11 June 1840
Ship	State	Description
Henry Neeland	United States	The ship was driven ashore near Brouwershaven, Zeeland, Netherlands. She was on a voyage from New York to Rotterdam, South Holland, Netherlands.
Margaret	United Kingdom	The ship ran aground on the Brig Rock. She was refloated but consequently sank. Her crew were rescued. Margaret was on a voyage from Liverpool, Lancashire to Halifax, Nova Scotia, British North America.

== 12 June ==
List of shipwrecks: 12 June 1840
Ship	State	Description
Castor	Netherlands	The ship ran aground on The Manacles. She was on a voyage from Amsterdam, North Holland to Batavia, Netherlands East Indies. Castor was refloated and put into Plymouth, Devon, United Kingdom, where she was beached.
Marianne	United Kingdom	The ship was driven ashore at Milford Haven, Pembrokeshire.

== 14 June ==
List of shipwrecks: 14 June 1840
Ship	State	Description
Carib	Saint Kitts	The mail boat was driven ashore at St. John's, Antigua. She was refloated the next day and proceeded for Saint Kitts.
Conquest	United Kingdom	The ship ran aground off Helsingør, Denmark. She was on a voyage from Stettin to London. Conquest was refloated the next day and taken into Copenhagen for repairs.

== 15 June ==
List of shipwrecks: 15 June 1840
Ship	State	Description
Superb	United Kingdom	The ship ran aground on the Sandhammer Reef. She was on a voyage from Königsburg, Prussia to London. Superb was refloated and put into Copenhagen, Denmark.
Wilhelm	Russia	The ship ran aground in the Victoria Channel. She was on a voyage from Liverpool, Lancashire, United Kingdom to Riga. Wilhelm was refloated and put back to Liverpool.

== 16 June ==
List of shipwrecks: 16 June 1840
Ship	State	Description
Delight	United Kingdom	The schooner was severely damaged by fire at Wapping, Middlesex.
Dunchatten	United Kingdom	The schooner was severely damaged by fire at Wapping.
London Packet	United Kingdom	The schooner was severely damaged by fire at Wapping.

== 17 June ==
List of shipwrecks: 17 June 1840
Ship	State	Description
Arab	United Kingdom	The ship was destroyed by fire in Mobile Bay. Her crew were rescued.
Lord Castlereagh	United Kingdom	The full-rigged ship was wrecked at Bombay, India while attempting to enter port during a gale with the loss of 130 lives.
Helen	United Kingdom	The ship ran around off "Magensholm". She was on a voyage from Liverpool, Lancashire to Riga, Russia. Helen was refloated and put into Riga.
Lord William Bentinck	United Kingdom	The full-rigged ship was wrecked at Bombay while attempting to enter port during a gale. One hundred people died.

== 18 June ==
List of shipwrecks: 18 June 1840
Ship	State	Description
Brothers	United Kingdom	The ship was driven ashore in Carlingford Bay. She was on a voyage from Saint John, New Brunswick, British North America to Newry, County Antrim.

== 19 June ==
List of shipwrecks: 19 June 1840
Ship	State	Description
Alert	France	The ship was driven ashore and wrecked on Skagen, Denmark. Her crew were rescued. She was on a voyage from Stralsund to Calais.
Catherine	United Kingdom	The ship ran aground on the South Bull, in the Irish Sea.
Lavinia	United Kingdom	The ship sank at Sunderland, County Durham. She was refloated the next day and beached.
Minerva	United Kingdom	The ship ran aground on the Beaumont Shoals. She was on a voyage from Montreal, Lower Canada to Halifax, Nova Scotia, British North America.
Myrtle	United Kingdom	The ship was wrecked on Cape Sable Island, Nova Scotia. She was on a voyage from Saint John, New Brunswick, British North America to London.

== 20 June ==
List of shipwrecks: 20 June 1840
Ship	State	Description
Pavilion	United Kingdom	The ship sank in the English Channel off Hythe, Kent. She was on a voyage from Hartlepool, County Durham to Shoreham-by-Sea, Sussex. Pavilion was later refloated and beached. She was wrecked on 17 August.
Shylock	United States	The whaler was wrecked on a reef off Vatoa, Fiji with the loss of seven of her 25 crew. Survivors were rescued by Triton ( (United Kingdom of Great Britain and Ireland) New South Wales).
Star	United Kingdom	The ship ran aground and was damaged at Port Talbot, Glamorgan. She was on a voyage from Barrow-in-Furness, Cumberland to Port Talbot.

== 21 June ==
List of shipwrecks: 21 June 1840
Ship	State	Description
Economy	United Kingdom	The ship was driven ashore on the Nehrung, in the Baltic Sea. She was on a voyage from Newcastle upon Tyne, Northumberland to Pillau, Prussia. She was refloated 23 June and take into Pillau.
Venus	Sweden	The ship was driven ashore near Helsingborg. She was on a voyage from Stettin to Rotterdam, South Holland. Netherlands.

== 22 June ==
List of shipwrecks: 22 June 1840
Ship	State	Description
City of Limerick	United Kingdom	The ship ran aground on the Sandhead, in the Solent. She was on a voyage from Portsmouth to Southampton, Hampshire. She was refloated and resumed her voyage.
Helena	Belgium	The ship foundered in the English Channel off Roscoff, Finistère, France. She was on a voyage from Antwerp to Smyrna, Ottoman Empire.

== 23 June ==
List of shipwrecks: 23 June 1840
Ship	State	Description
Ann	United Kingdom	The ship was driven ashore at Helsingør, Denmark. She was on a voyage from Newcastle upon Tyne, Northumberland to Saint Petersburg, Russia. Ann was refloated and resumed her voyage.
Hecla	United Kingdom	The whaler was sunk by ice in the Davis Straits. Her crew were rescued.
Hector	United Kingdom	The whaler was lost in the Davis Straits. Her crew were rescued. Note:Possibly Hecla (above) misreported.
Oriental	France	The surveying ship, a frigate, was wrecked on Punto del Bundy, near Valparaíso, Chile. All on board were rescued.

== 24 June ==
List of shipwrecks: 24 June 1840
Ship	State	Description
Conservative	United Kingdom	The ship was driven ashore in the Dardanelles.
Rosalind	United Kingdom	The ship was driven ashore in the Dardanelles.
Vaillant	France	The ship foundered off Barfleur, Manche with the loss of a crew member. She was on a voyage from the Clyde to Rouen, Seine-Inférieure.

== 26 June ==
List of shipwrecks: 26 June 1840
Ship	State	Description
Emma	New South Wales	The schooner was wrecked on a reef in Wabba Bay. Her crew were rescued.

== 27 June ==
List of shipwrecks: 27 June 1840
Ship	State	Description
Isabel	United Kingdom	The ship collided with HMS Beaver (Royal Navy) and sank in the River Thames at Grays, Essex. She was on a voyage from London to Lisbon, Portugal.
Telemachus	Kingdom of Sardinia	The ship was destroyed by fire in the Atlantic Ocean Her crew were rescued by Ocean (United Kingdom). Telemachus was on a voyage from Genoa to Brazil.
Thomas	United Kingdom	The ship sank off Walney Island, Lancashire.
Vanguard	New South Wales	The schooner was wrecked at "McLeary". Her crew were rescued. She was on a voyage from Port Phillip to Sydney.

== 28 June ==
List of shipwrecks: 28 June 1840
Ship	State	Description
Maria	Van Diemen's Land	The brigantine departed from Port Adelaide, South Australia for Hobart and was subsequently wrecked in Encounter Bay. The crew and passengers on board reached shore, but all were killed by the local Milmenrura people, or disappeared without trace.
Mellish	United Kingdom	The barque ran aground at Port Phillip, New South Wales. She was on a voyage from an English port to Port Phillip.
Susan Crane	British North America	The ship was wrecked on the Cobbler's Rocks, off Barbados. Her crew were rescued.

== 29 June ==
List of shipwrecks: 29 June 1840
Ship	State	Description
Anna	United Kingdom	The ship was driven ashore on Bornholm, Denmark with the loss of a crew member. She was on a voyage from Hull to a Baltic port.

== 30 June ==
List of shipwrecks: 30 June 1840
Ship	State	Description
Aquila	New South Wales	The cutter was wrecked in the Bay of Islands with the loss of three of her crew.
Giovanni	Trieste	The ship was driven ashore and wrecked at Gibraltar. She was on a voyage from Trieste to London, United Kingdom.

== Unknown date ==
List of shipwrecks: Unknown date in June 1840
Ship	State	Description
Agnes	New South Wales	The ship foundered off Cape Schanck.
Armonia	Netherlands	The ship struck a rock off the west coast of Norway and sank. Her crew were rescued. She was on a voyage from Norway to a Dutch port.
Augusta	France	The ship was abandoned in the Atlantic Ocean before 20 June. She was on a voyage from Tabasco, Mexico to Marseille, Bouches-du-Rhône.
Delaware	United States	The ship ran aground on the Florida Reef before 10 June. She was on a voyage from Liverpool, Lancashire, United Kingdom to New Orleans, Louisiana. Delaware was later refloated. She arrived at New Orleans on 18 June.
Delphine	France	The whaler was wrecked on Chiloé Island, Chile. Her crew were rescued by Asie (France). Delphine was on a voyage from Havre de Grâce, Seine-Inférieure to the South Seas.
Ellen	United Kingdom	The ship was driven ashore at St Alban's Head, Dorset. she was refloated on 16 June and towed into Southampton, Hampshire.
Kronan	Sweden	The ship was abandoned before 5 June. She was taken into Kragerø, Norway.
Premium	United Kingdom	The collier, a brig, ran aground on the Gunfleet Sand, in the North Sea off the coast of Essex. She was refloated with assistance from three smacks from Colchester.
Reine Rose	France	The ship was wrecked at Maldonado, Uruguay before 16 June.
