= Chris Lockwood =

Chris Lockwood may refer to:

- Chris Lockwood, drummer for Super Deluxe (band)
- Chris Lockwood, character in 40 Pounds of Trouble
