= Fame and Fortune (disambiguation) =

Fame and Fortune is a 1986 album by Bad Company.

Fame and Fortune may also refer to:

== Music ==
- "Fame and Fortune" (Elvis Presley song), 1960
- "Fame and Fortune" (Bad Company song), 1986
- "Fame and Fortune", a song by Mission of Burma from Signals, Calls, and Marches, 1981
- Fame & Fortune?, an album by Formerly of Bucks Fizz, 2012

== Other uses ==
- Fame and Fortune (game show), an Irish television show 1996–2006
- Fame and Fortune Weekly, an American periodical for children 1905–1929
- Fame and Fortune (film), a 1918 American silent Western film starring Tom Mix

== See also ==
- Flames and Fortune, a 1911 film
- Fame (disambiguation)
- Fortune (disambiguation)
