= William Miles (1808 ship) =

UK merchant ship and convict transport (1808–1846)

History

United Kingdom
- Name: William Miles
- Owner: 1808: James Martin Hilhouse, George Hilhouse, Robert Hilhouse, and Josiah Gist, ship builders; with Philip John Miles, merchant, all of Bristol; 1817: Samuel Beadle & Co.; 1831:T.Ward; 1834:T.Benson
- Builder: George Hilhouse & Sons, Bristol
- Launched: 20 October 1808
- Fate: Broken up 1846

General characteristics
- Tons burthen: 577, or 57737/94, or 581, or 58112/94, or 600 (bm)
- Length: 127 ft 8 in (38.9 m)
- Beam: 32 ft 4 in (9.9 m)
- Draught: 24 ft 9 1/2 in (7.6 m)
- Complement: 35
- Armament: 14 × 6&9-pounder guns
- Notes: Three decks and three masts

William Miles was launched at Bristol in 1808 as a West Indiaman. For 20 years she was the largest vessel built in the port. In 1817 a new owner started sailing her to India, sailing under a licence from the East India Company (EIC). In 1828 she made a voyage transporting convicts to Van Diemen's Land. Thereafter she traded with Sierra Leone, Louisiana, and possibly other ports as well. She was broken up in 1846.

== Career ==
For 20 years William Miles was the largest vessel built in the port, and almost double the size of most Bristol-built West Indiamen. She was licensed to sail as a "running ship", authorised to sail independently of any convoy. As a West Indiaman, she had less height between decks than comparably sized East Indiamen. William Miles had a height of 5 ft 11 in (1.8 m) in her upper deck and a mere 4 ft 10 in (1.5 m) under her lower deck. Lord William Bentinck, a comparably sized East Indiaman, had a height of 6 ft 9 in (2.1 m) below her deck. The cargoes the two types of vessels were designed to carry dictated the difference. West Indiamen brought semi-liquid sugar back to England in casks laid on their sides that were only laid in one course. East Indiamen carried mostly light goods in bales or cases that could be and were necessarily laid to a greater height.

William Miles first appeared in Lloyd's Register (LR) in 1808.

Year	Master	Owner	Trade	Source
1808	W.Thorn	P.J.Miles	Bristol–Jamaica	LR

She was the largest vessel built at Bristol for the next 20 years.

Captain William Thorn (or Thorne), acquired a letter of marque on 31 October 1809.

On 1 September 1813 the crew on William Miles deserted to avoid impressment (the press gang). She was in the inner locks of Cumberland Basin (Bristol), but had not yet docked. She was crushed against one side of the lock, and as the tide fell she became stranded and she bilged. She was carrying 530 hogsheads of sugar; only 70 hogsheads could be landed before she filled with water. She was refloated on 8 October by ingenious means and repaired.

Year	Master	Owner	Trade	Source & notes
1815	W.Thorn	P.J.Miles	Bristol–Jamaica	LR; damages repaired 1814
1818	S.Beddle	Coot & Co.	Bristol–Bengal	LR; damages repaired 1814 and some repairs 1819

In 1813 the British EIC had lost its monopoly on the trade between India and Britain. British ships were then free to sail to India or the Indian Ocean under a licence from the EIC.

In November 1817, one of P.J.Miles's ships, Sarah, was bound for Jamaica when she caught fire in the Float (North Docks) at Bristol. (Note: The cause of the fire was a large pot of tar that had been set on fire below decks to drive out rats. The tar was believed to have boiled over, setting Sarah on fire. The prompt arrival of the fire engine saved the ship.) She sustained considerable damage and Miles decided to sell her, and William Miles, his other large ship.

In 1817 Samuel Beadle purchased William Miles and on 17 April transferred her registry to London. On 17 May 1817 William Miles, Beadle, master, arrived at Madeira and left the next day, bound for Madras and Bengal. She arrived at Bengal on 24 October. She sailed for Madras and London on 27 January 1818. On 8 July she was off Lymington, having sailed from Madras on 27 February and St Helena on 17 April. William Miles, Beadle, master, arrived at Gravesend, Kent on 17 July.

On 16 May 1819 William Miles, Beadle, master, sailed for Fort St. George, India, (Madras). Her destination was variously reported as Madeira and India, Madras, or Madras and Bengal.) She arrived at Madeira on 1 June and sailed for Madras and Bengal on 5 June. She arrived at Madras on 1 October. She then went on to Bengal. Homeward bound, she arrived at St Helena on 25 March 1820 from Madras and left the next day for London. She arrived at Gravesend on 20 May.

On 15 April 1821, William Miles, Beadle, master, sailed from Gravesend from Madras and Bengal. On 15 July she left Mauritius, bound for Madras and Bengal. She arrived at Madras on 16 September and on 30 September sailed for Bengal; she arrived at Bengal on 14 October. She sailed for London on 12 January 1822. She arrived at St. Helena on 30 April and sailed for London on 7 May. On 5 July she arrived at Gravesend.

On 31 March 1823, William Miles, Beadle, master, sailed for Madras. Around the end of May she arrived at Mauritius. On 30 June she sailed for Madras. On 4 August she arrived at Bengal. On 9 January 1824 she sailed from Madras for St. Helena and London. Around 10 April she was off St. Helena. On 9 June she was off Scilly. On 16 June she arrived at Gravesend.

On 12 May 1825, William Miles, Beadle, master, sailed for Madras and Bengal. On 27 August she arrived at Mauritius. On 29 September she arrived at Madras; she sailed for Bengal on 2 October. She arrived at Bengal on 13 October. She sailed from Penang on 15 February 1826. On 7 May 1826, William Miles, Sampson, master, arrived at St. Helena from Penang; she sailed for London on 10 May. She arrived at Gravesend on 10 July.

Year	Master	Owner	Trade	Source & notes
1828	S.Beadle; Sampson	S.Beadle	London–India	LR; damages repaired 1814 and good repair 1819
1829	Sampson	S.Beadle	London–New South Wales	LR; damages repaired 1814 and good repair 1819

Convict voyage (1828): Captain John G. Sampson sailed William Miles from the Downs on 28 March 1828, bound for Van Diemen's Land. (Note: The Government had hired her at a rate of £4 6s 11d per ton, for 581 tons.) She arrived at Hobart on 39 July. She had embarked 192 male convicts, seven of whom died on the voyage. Two officers and 30 other ranks of the 39th Regiment of Foot provided the guard. William Miles sailed on 31 August for Calcutta. She arrived at Calcutta on 22 November. In February 1829 William Miles, Sampson, master, was cleared at Calcutta to sail to Amherst Town and Rangoon. Captain John Garencieres Sampson died of apoplexy on 9 August 1829, aged 38, on William Miles while she was sailing from India to London. She arrived on 23 September at St Helena from Penang, and two days later sailed for London.

Year	Master	Owner	Trade	Source & notes
1830	Sampson; Middleton	S.Beadle	London–New South Wales	LR; damages repaired 1814 and good repair 1819
1831	Middleton; J.Christall	T.Ward	London–Sierra Leone	LR; damages repaired 1814, good repair 1819, & some repairs 1831
1834	Brown; Kindley	T.Benson	London	LR; large repair 1834
1838	Kindley	T.Benson	London	LR; large repair 1834, "wd" 1835, & some repairs 1837
1839	Kindley [V.W.] Samson	T.Benson	Liverpool–Mobile; Liverpool–New Orleans	LR; large repair 1834, "wd" 1835, & damages repaired 1837 & 1840

On 29 December 1838 William Miles had to put back to Mobile as she was in a leaky state after having been onshore. Captain Kindley died onboard her in 1840 as she was sailing from West Africa to the United States.

Year	Master	Owner	Trade	Source & notes
1841	Samson	T.Benson	Liverpool–New Orleans; London	LR; large repair 1834, "wd" 1835, & damages repaired 1837 & 1840

== Fate ==
William Miles was last listed in 1845. By one account, she was broken up in 1846.

A second report has her register being cancelled on 9 April 1851, demolition being completed.
