= Sarah (1810 ship) =

History

United Kingdom
- Name: Sarah
- Owner: 1810: Philip James Miles; 1818:E.Read
- Builder: Hillhouse Sons & Co., Bristol
- Launched: 12 March 1810, or 24 March 1810
- Fate: Wrecked 10 July 1822

General characteristics
- Tons burthen: 499, or 500, or 50048/94 (bm)
- Propulsion: Sail
- Complement: 35
- Armament: 14 × 12&9&6-pounder cannons
- Notes: Three decks

Sarah was launched at Bristol as a West Indiaman. From 1818, after repairs to damage from a fire in 1817, she sailed as an East Indiaman until she wrecked at the Cape of Good Hope in 1822.

== Career ==
Sarah entered Lloyd's Register in 1810 with J. Baker, master, P.J.Miles, owner, and trade Bristol–Saint Croix. Captain James Baker acquired a letter of marque on 21 March 1810. Sarah made annual West Indian voyages until the end of 1817.

On 7 August 1812 Betsey, of Dublin, Nixon, master, developed a leak. The next day her crew and ten passengers abandoned her in the Atlantic Ocean at (44°27′N 41°09′W). Sarah was returning from Jamaica when she encountered the survivors. She took them aboard and brought them to Bristol.

On 20 November 1817 Sarah, Baker, master, was bound for Jamaica when she caught fire in the Float (North Docks) at Bristol. She sustained considerable damage and by the next day was full of water. (Note: The cause of the fire was a large pot of tar that had been set on fire below decks to drive out rats. The tar was believed to have boiled over, setting Sarah on fire. The prompt arrival of the fire engine saved the ship.) She sustained considerable damage and her owner, P.J.Miles decided to sell her, and William Miles, his other large ship.

In March 1818, Sarah was advertised for sale "... as she now lies (in consequence of having one side much injured by fire)." Her buyer was a London merchant (given variously in advertisements as Edmund Read or Edward Reed). She then underwent repairs. In its 1819 volume, Lloyd's Register gave her owner and master as Norton, and her trade as Bristol–India.

On 19 April 1819, Sarah, James Norton, master, "late of the Company's service" sailed for Bombay, via Madeira, Cape of Good Hope and the Île de France. Lloyd's Register's list of ships sailing under a license from the EIC gave her owner's name as E. Read, and her destination as Fort St George (Madras.

== Fate ==
On 10 July 1822 Sarah, Norton, master, was at anchor at the Cape while sailing from Bombay to London. A gale came up and filled her. Norton cut her from her anchors in the hope of running her ashore and saving the cargo. However, she was unmanageable and she drifted to the head of the bay; morning revealed that she was a total wreck. Much of her cargo had floated ashore.
