= Bonnetta =

Bonnetta may refer to:

== People ==
- Jonas Bonnetta, Canadian singer and songwriter, member of Evening Hymns
- Rachel Bonnetta, Canadian reporter and television host

== Ships ==
- Bonnetta, UK ship that foundered in the North Sea in 26 March 1836
