= Henry Porcher (1817 ship) =

History

United Kingdom
- Name: Henry Porcher
- Namesake: Henry Porcher, the son of then East India agent, Josias Porcher.
- Owner: Joseph Graves; Samuel Marjoribanks; George F Young.; Griffith & Co., London (1832); Thomson, Grangemouth (1844)
- Builder: Hilhouse & Sons and Company
- Launched: 14 November 1817
- Fate: Broken up in 1860

General characteristics
- Type: barque
- Tons burthen: 45790/94, or 460, or 465, or 485(bm)
- Length: 113 ft 8 in (34.6 m) (overall); 90 ft 6 3/4 in (27.6 m) (keel)
- Beam: 30 ft 10 in (9.4 m)
- Depth of hold: 13 ft 9 in (4.2 m)
- Propulsion: Sail
- Notes: Two decks

Henry Porcher was launched in 1817 at Bristol, England. Between 1818 and 1831 she made three voyages to India for the British East India Company (EIC). On the second she first transported convicts to Sydney, New South Wales. Between these voyages for the EIC Henry Porcher traded privately to India as a licensed ship. She made two further voyages as a convict transport, one to Sydney in 1834–35, and one to Hobart in 1836. She grounded in 1858 and was broken up in 1860.

== Career ==
On report states that Hillhouse built Henry Porcher for private clients and that immediately after she was built she was taken over by the EIC. Actually, Joseph Graves tendered her to the EIC who hired her on 17 October 1817 for one voyage at a rate of £17 15s per ton or 465 tons.

=== First EIC voyage (1818–1819) ===
Captain James Patten Anstice (or Anstrue), sailed Henry Porcher from the Downs on 1 April 1818, bound for Bengal and Bombay. She arrived at Kidderpore on 11 August. Outward bound, she passed Saugor on 25 September, reaching Cochin on 28 November, and arriving at Bombay on 8 December. Homeward bound, she reached Tellicherry on 7 January 1819, and St Helena on 26 March, before arriving at the Downs on 7 June.

=== First convict voyage and second EIC voyage (1825–1826) ===
On 25 May 1825 the EIC hired the New South Wales ship Henry Porcher to bring back teas from China. The rate was £10 19s per ton for 500 tons.

Under the command of John Thomson, Henry Porcher departed Dublin, Ireland, on 5 August 1825 and arrived at Sydney on 3 December. She embarked 176 male convicts, had one death en route, and disembarked 175. A detachment from the 57th Regiment of Foot provided the guard.

She left Sydney, bound for China. She arrived at Whampoa on 5 March 1826. She reached St Helena on 7 August, and arrived at the Downs on 26 September.

=== Third EIC voyage (1830–1831) ===
On 13 April 1830, the EIC hired Henry Porcher to carry troops to Madras and Bengal. The rate was £10 8s per ton for 485 tons.

Captain Gabriel Jemmett Redman sailed Henry Porcher from the Downs on 8 June 1830, bound for Madras and Bengal. She reached Madras on 12 October and arrived at Calcutta on 14 November. Homeward bound, she reached St Helena on 28 May 1831, and arrived at the Downs on 24 June.

=== Voyage (1832–1833) ===
Captain John Baxter sailed Henry Porcher from London on 23 September 1832 with passengers for Australia. He was at Plymouth on 21 October. He departed Rio de Janeiro on 8 January 1833 and arrived at the Cape Good Hope on 20 February. He departed 1 March 1833 and arrived at Hobart on 24 April 1833. Henry Porcher departed Hobart on 9 June and arrived at Sydney on 29 June. She then sailed back to England.

=== Second convict voyage (1834–1835) ===
Captain John Hart and Henry Porcher departed The Downs on 4 September 1834, and arrived in Sydney on 1 January 1835. She embarked 260 male convicts, had eight deaths en route, and disembarked 252. Two officers and 29 rank-and-file from the 50th Regiment of Foot provided the guard. They brought with them their wives and children. One soldier died on the outward bound leg. She left Sydney in February, sailing directly for England.

=== Third convict voyage (1836) ===
On her third voyage as a convict transport, Henry Porcher, again under the command of John Hart, departed Portsmouth on 4 August 1836, and arrived at Hobart on 15 November 1836. She embarked 260 male convicts, had two deaths en route, and landed 258.

=== Settlers to South Australia ===
Henry Porcher sailed from London on 26 February 1838 and arrived at Port Adelaide on 1 July. She was carrying 141 passengers (99 adults and 41 children).

== Fate ==
While she was travelling from Quebec to Grangemouth, Captain Simpson, who was suffering from delirium tremens, committed suicide in September 1858. Her pilot had left before Simpson shot himself and though she anchored to wait out bad weather, her cables parted with result that the ship went aground near Thurso, Quebec. All 15 members of the crew landed safely.

Henry Porcher was finally sold in 1860 for breaking up.
