= Hilhouse =

English shipbuilder

- Company type: Private
- Industry: Shipbuilding, Shipowner
- Founded: 1772
- Defunct: 1845
- Fate: Closed
- Successor: Yard taken over by Charles Hill & Sons
- Headquarters: River Avon, UK
- Key people: J.M. Hilhouse (founder), George Hilhouse (son), Charles Hill

Hilhouse (also spelled Hillhouse) was a shipbuilder in Bristol, England, who built merchantman and men-of-war during the 18th and 19th centuries. The company subsequently became Charles Hill & Sons in 1845.

The company, and its successor Charles Hill & Sons, were the most important shipbuilders in Bristol, and taking the concern together built over 560 ships over their 200 years of existence.

== History ==
=== Origins ===
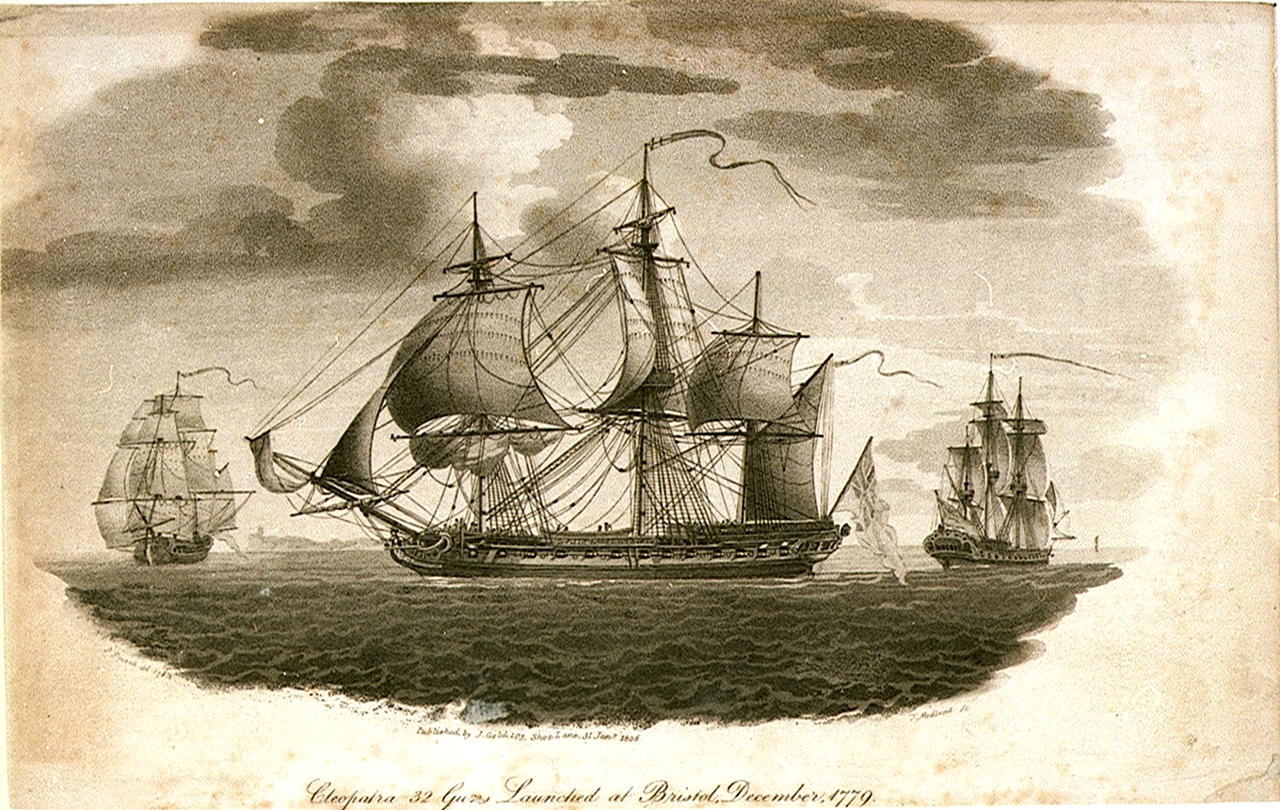
HMS Cleopatra, launched by James Martin Hilhouse on 26 November 1779, as depicted by Nicholas Pocock.

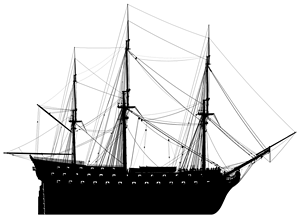
Silhouette of the ship-of-the-line Nassau launched on 28 September 1785 by Hilhouse in Bristol.

The shipbuilding concern Hilhouse and Company was first established in 1772 by James Martin Hilhouse (1749–1822), after inheriting a fortune from his father, James Hilhouse, a Bristol Sheriff and councillor who also ran a successful privateering venture. The company acquired the large Hotwells drydock, built by the engineer William Champion in 1765 on the north side of the River Avon, to build merchantman and undertake ship repair work. From 1778, Hilhouse secured Admiralty contracts for warships following the outbreak of the American Revolutionary War, including for the fourth rate Trusty.

On 28 September 1785, Hilhouse launched the 1,406 tonne 64-gun Ardent-class ship of the line Nassau, which was the largest ship yet built in Bristol. By 1786 they had built twelve warships of 3rd to 6th rates before orders became dominated by merchantmen.

=== Hilhouse and Company-built ships ===
Major ships built by Hilhouse and Company:

- Exeter (1776), 300 tons (bm) West Indiaman.
- Medea (1778). 611 tons (bm) 28-gun sixth-rate frigate.
- Cleopatra (1779). 689 tons (bm) 32-gun fifth-rate frigate.
- Crescent (1779). 689 tons (bm) 28-gun sixth-rate frigate.
- Mars (1779). 600 tons (bm) privateer frigate.
- Termagant (1780). 26-gun sloop.
- Arethusa (1781). 948 tons (bm) 38-gun fifth-rate frigate.
- Trusty (1782). 1,000 tons (bm) 50-gun fourth-rate ship of the line.
- Serapis (1782). 900 tons (bm) 44-gun fifth-rate frigate.
- Charon (1783). 900 tons (bm) 44-gun fifth-rate frigate.
- Nassau (1785). 1,200 tons (bm) 64-gun third-rate ship of the line.
- Melampus (1785). 939 tons (bm) 36-gun fifth-rate frigate.
- Severn (1786). 900 tons (bm) 44-gun fifth-rate frigate.
- Pilgrim (1786). 306 tons (bm) merchant vessel.
- Marquis of Worcester (1787). 315 tons (bm) merchant vessel.
- Diomede (1795). 891 tons (bm) 44-gun fifth-rate frigate.
- Fame. 492 tons (bm) Intended as a West Indiaman but employed as an East Indiaman.
- Hope (1801). 216 tons (bm) merchant vessel.
- Concord (1801). 317 tons (bm) merchant vessel.

=== Hilhouse & Sons-built ships ===
In 1803 the company became Hilhouse & Sons and Company and expansion continued. By 1810, Charles Hill had joined the firm, and Hilhouse had acquired two further dockyards in city, Wapping dockyard, near Prince Street in 1813, and Limekiln Dock, on Gasferry Lane on the north side of the river in 1820. In 1814 the company built the first steamboat in Bristol, the Charlotte and Hope. In 1820 the company developed New Dockyard opposite the original site at Hotwells, what was to become the Albion Yard, and built two wet docks, a dry dock and building berths. This lead within 4 years to the closure of both the Wapping and Hotwells Dockyards. The West Indiaman Weare of 446 t was the first launch from the Albion Yard in 1820.

During the 1830s and 1840s William Patterson launched the ground-breaking Great Western and Great Britain steamships in the adjacent Bristol dockyard, and the company subsequently lost out on important subsequent orders.

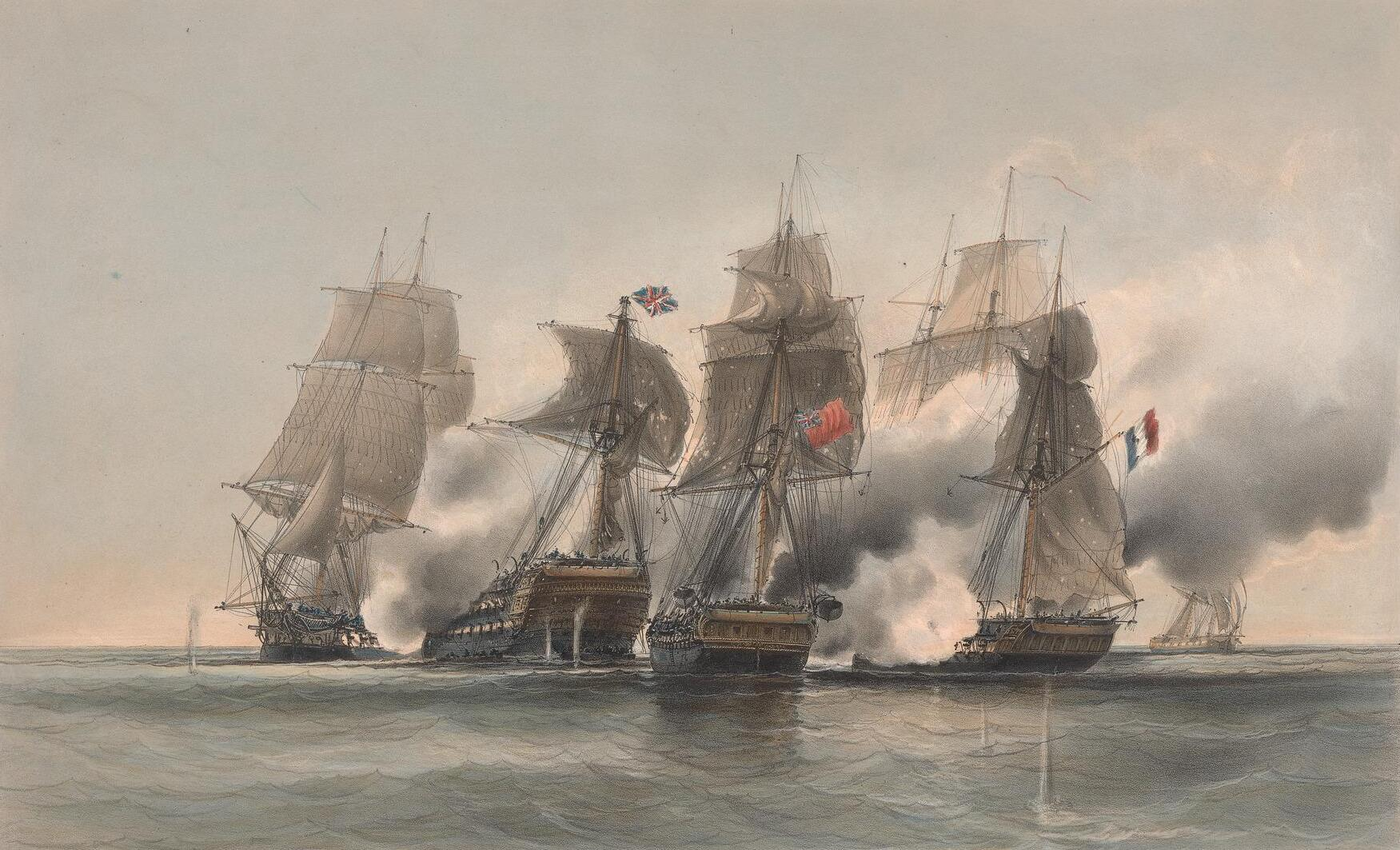
French frigates Cybèle and Prudente battling HMS Centurion and the Hilhouse-built HMS Diomede (in the centre), on 17 December 1794

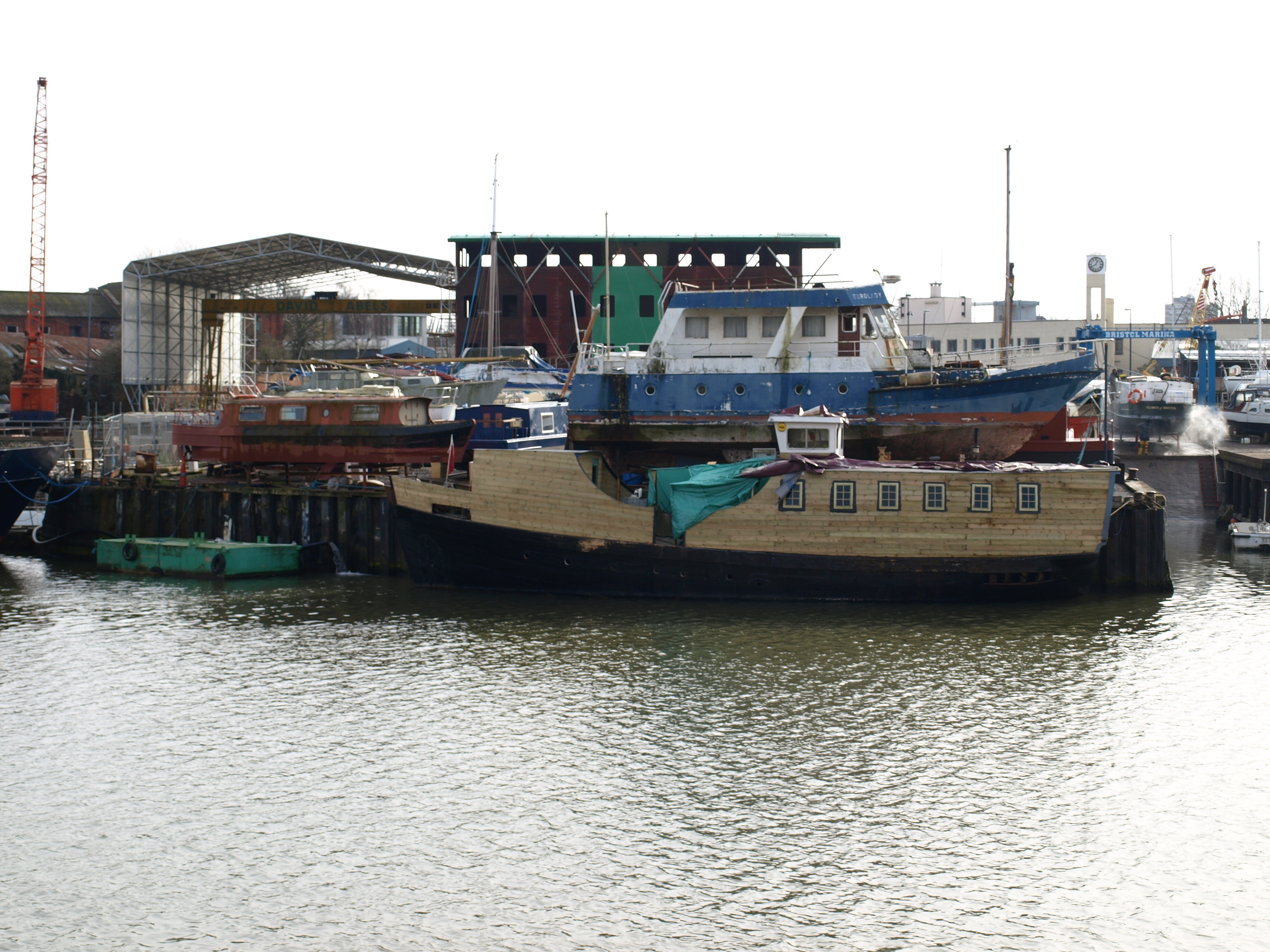
The site of the Hilhouse built Albion Yard today, now occupied by Abels Shipbuilders and Baltic Wharf Marina

Major ships built by Hilhouse & Sons and Company:

- Albacore (1804). 18-gun sloop-of-war.
- St Vincent (1804). 493 tons (bm) West Indiaman.
- Fame (1805). 401 tons (bm) merchant vessel.
- Nelson (1807). 580 tons (bm) West Indiaman.
- Severn (1806 ship). 478 tons (bm) merchant vessel.
- William Miles (1808 ship), 577 tons (bm) West Indiaman.
- Lady Carrington (1809 ship). 471 tons (bm) merchant vessel; 564 tons (bm) East Indiaman.
- Sarah (1810 ship), 500 tons (bm) West Indiaman.
- Charlotte (1810). 427 tons (bm) West Indiaman.
- Bernard (1813). 468 tons (bm) merchant vessel.
- Princess Charlotte (1814). 411 tons (bm) merchant vessel.
- Charlotte and Hope (1814). Wooden paddle-wheel steamer.
- Kingston (1817). 431 tons (bm) merchant vessel.
- Henry Porcher (1817 ship). 485 t East Indiaman.
- Woodford (1819 ship) 544 tons (bm) (bm), merchant vessel
- Weare (1820). 446 tons (bm) West Indiaman.
- George IV (1821). 135 tons (bm) wooden paddle-wheel steamer.
- Viscount Palmerston (1821). 188 tons (bm) wooden paddle-wheel steamer.
- Hero (1823). 402 tons (bm) merchant vessel.
- Elphinstone (1825). 420 tons (bm) merchant vessel.
- Lord William Bentinck (1828), 564 tons (bm), made one voyage for the British East India Company and one voyage transporting convicts to Tasmania. Wrecked with great loss of life at Bombay on 20 June 1840.
- Reliance (1831 ship), 337 tons (bm), wrecked 1836.
- Elizabeth (1832). 445 tons (bm) merchant vessel.
- Orestes (1835). 529 tons (bm) East Indiaman.
- Princess Royal (1841). 462 tons (bm) merchant vessel.
- Duke of Cornwall (1843). 505 tons (bm) merchant vessel.
- Manuela (1843). 348 tons (bm) barque, the last ship built by Hilhouse.

=== Enter Charles Hill ===
In 1824 the company became George Hilhouse & Company, and the following year a young shipwright by the name of Charles Hill became a partner, eventually leading in 1840 to the name of the business becoming Hilhouse, Hill & Company. Charles Hill subsequently took over running more and more of the business, and in 1845 he took sole control of the business and the firm became Charles Hill & Sons.

The Hilhouse built Albion Yard has continued in use up until this day, as Abels Shipbuilders to 2016, and later reopening as Albion Dock.

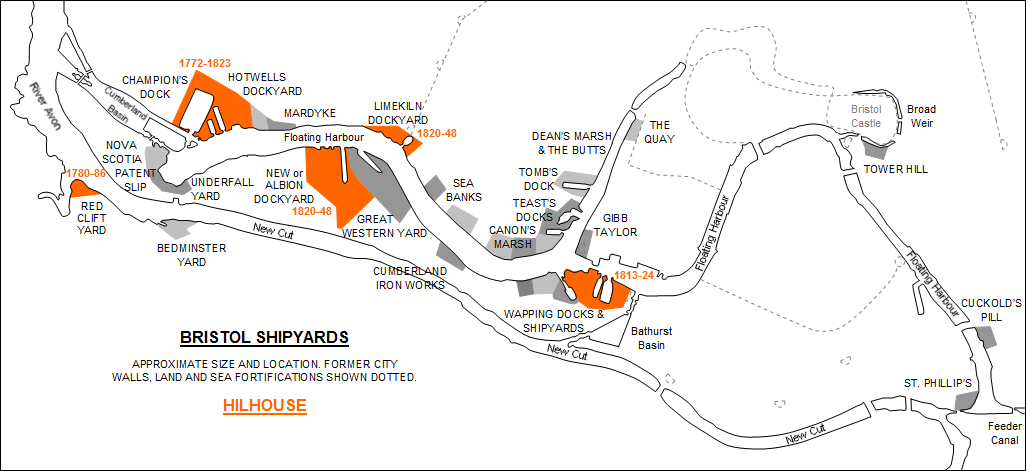
Bristol Shipyards with the various locations of Hilhouse highlighted. They operated five different sites in the 18th and 19th centuries.

== Portraits ==
A pair of portraits of Mr. and Mrs. James Martin Hilhouse by Thomas Hudson were once owned by American preservationist Jim Williams. They hung in the dining room of his Mercer House home, until they were sold at a Sotheby's auction by his sister in 2000, ten years after Williams' death.
