= Fame =

Fame usually refers to the state of notability or celebrity.

Fame may also refer to:

== Books ==
- Fame: an art project, a 2013 book and series of paintings by Robert Priseman
- Fame (novel) (German Ruhm), a 2009 novel by Daniel Kehlmann
- Fame, a 2005 novel by Karen Kingsbury
- Fame, a 2008 novel by Mark Rowlands
- Fame, a 2011 novel by Tilly Bagshawe

== Film, television and stage ==
- Fame (1936 film), a British comedy
- Fame (1980 film), an American musical
  - Fame (1982 TV series), a 1982–1987 television adaptation of the film
  - Fame (2009 film), a remake of the musical film
  - Fame (musical), a stage adaptation of the film that premiered in 1988
  - Fame (2003 TV series), a talent competition
    - Fame: The Musical (Irish TV series), an Irish version of the NBC talent show
- Fame (2007 film), a stand-up tour and DVD by Ricky Gervais
- "Fame" (Law & Order), a 2006 television episode
- "Fame" (Surgical Spirit), a 1989 television episode
- "Fame", a 2010 episode of NCIS: Los Angeles
- "Fame", a 1978 episode in the Hallmark Hall of Fame
- "Fame", an episode of the TV series Pocoyo

== Music ==
- FAME Studios, a recording studio
- Fame (duo), a musical duo
- Georgie Fame, English R&B jazz musician Clive Powell (born 1943)
- Fame (Thai band)

=== Albums ===
- Fame (Grace Jones album), a 1978 album by Grace Jones
- Fame (soundtrack), 1980 soundtrack album to the musical film Fame
- The Fame, the 2008 debut album by Lady Gaga
- F.A.M.E. (Chris Brown album), 2011
- F.A.M.E. (Maluma album), 2018
- Fame (EP), the 2020 debut album of Han Seung-woo

=== Songs ===
- "Fame" (David Bowie song), Recorded and released in 1975, written by Bowie, Carlos Alomar and John Lennon
- "Fame" (Irene Cara song), winner of Academy Award for Best Original Song (from the above 1980 film)
- "F.A.M.E." (song), by Young Jeezy
- "Fame (The Game)", a song by Donna Summer
- "The Fame", a song by Lady Gaga from her debut album, The Fame
- "Fame", a song by B.o.B from his album, B.o.B Presents: The Adventures of Bobby Ray
- "Fame," a song by Ciipher from their 2022 EP The Code
- "Fame" (Riize song), a song by Riize from their 2025 single album of the same name
- "F.A.M.E", a 2020 song by Hooligan Hefs, featuring Hooks, Hooligan Skinny and Masi Rooc

== Acronyms ==
- Future American Magical Entertainers, a former magic club for young magicians
- FAME (database) (Forecasting Analysis and Modeling Environment), a database and programming language
- Fatty acid methyl esters
- Full-sky Astrometric Mapping Explorer, a proposed astrometric satellite canceled in 2002
- Fashion Malawi Edition (FAME), a fashion development organization
- Fans of Adult Media and Entertainment Awards, created in 2006
- Federation of Archaeological Managers and Employers, founded in 1975
- Falk Associates Management Enterprises, founded by David Falk in 1992

== Places in the United States ==
- Fame, Mississippi, an unincorporated community
- Fame, West Virginia, an unincorporated community

== Ships ==
- HMS Fame, numerous ships of the Royal Navy
- Fame (ship), numerous merchant ships

== Other uses ==
- Fame (magazine), an American celebrity monthly 1988–1991
- Fame (Confederate monument) or Gloria Victis, a Confederate memorial in Salisbury, North Carolina
- Lady Gaga Fame, a fragrance for women endorsed by Lady Gaga

== See also ==
- Famous (disambiguation)
- Pheme, the personification of fame and renown
