= List of shipwrecks in March 1836 =

The list of shipwrecks in March 1836 includes ships sunk, foundered, wrecked, grounded, or otherwise lost during March 1836.

== 1 March ==
List of shipwrecks: 1 March 1836
Ship	State	Description
Ajax	United Kingdom	The ship was driven ashore on Grain Spit, Kent. She was on a voyage from Palermo and Naples, Kingdom of the Two Sicilies to London. Ajax was refloated the next day.
Alexander	United Kingdom	The ship was driven ashore on the Isle of Grain, Kent.
Anna	United Kingdom	The ship was wrecked on the Gunfleet Sand, in the North Sea off the coast of Essex. Her crew were rescued. She was on a voyage from Stockton-on-Tees, County Durham to London.
Anne	United Kingdom	The ship was driven ashore on the coast of Suffolk. Her crew were rescued. She was on a voyage from Maldon, Essex to Goole, Yorkshire. Anne was refloated on 6 March and taken in to Southwold, Suffolk.
Crisis	United Kingdom	The ship was wrecked on the Kentish Knock. Her crew were rescued. She was on a voyage from Newcastle upon Tyne, Northumberland to the Charente, France.
Louise, Princess der Nederlanden	Netherlands	The ship was driven ashore on the Isle of Wight, United Kingdom. She was on a voyage from Dordrecht, South Holland to Batavia, Netherlands East Indies. She was refloated on 3 March and taken in to Cowes, Isle of Wight.
Martha	United Kingdom	The ship ran aground at Havre de Grâce, Seine-Inférieure. She was on a voyage from Havre de Grâce to Charleston, South Carolina, United States.
Trial	United Kingdom	The ship was driven ashore at Harwich, Essex. She was on a voyage from Great Yarmouth, Norfolk to Hull, Yorkshire. Trial was refloated on 3 March.

== 2 March ==
List of shipwrecks: 2 March 1836
Ship	State	Description
Barrow	United Kingdom	The ship was driven on to the Brazil Bank, in Liverpool Bay and was abandoned.

== 3 March ==
List of shipwrecks: 3 March 1836
Ship	State	Description
Barrow	United Kingdom	The ship ran aground on the Brazil Bank, in the Irish Sea and was abandoned.

== 4 March ==
List of shipwrecks: 4 March 1836
Ship	State	Description
Drey Gebroeders	Stettin	The ship was driven ashore and wrecked at Thisted, Denmark. Her crew were rescued. She was on a voyage from Vlaardingen, South Holland, Netherlands to Stettin.
Leonidas	United Kingdom	The ship collided with Benjamin Morgan (United Kingdom) and foundered in the Irish Sea off Point Lynas, Anglesey. She was on a voyage from South Shields, County Durham to Swansea, Glamorgan.
Sally	United Kingdom	The galiot was driven ashore and wrecked at Ardglass, County Down. She was on a voyage from Wexford to Galway.
Samuel	United Kingdom	The brig ran aground in the Copeland Islands, County Down. All on board survived. She was on a voyage from Whitehaven, Cumberland to Belfast, County Antrim. Samuel was refloated on 19 April and taken in to Belfast.

== 5 March ==
List of shipwrecks: 5 March 1836
Ship	State	Description
London	United Kingdom	The ship was driven ashore near Peterhead, Aberdeenshire. She was on a voyage from Aberdeen to Leith, Lothian.
Royal William	United Kingdom	The ship struck rocks off Warkworth, Northumberland and sank. Her crew were rescued. She was on a voyage from Newcastle upon Tyne to Montrose, Forfarshire.

== 6 March ==
List of shipwrecks: 6 March 1836
Ship	State	Description
London Packet	United Kingdom	The ship was driven ashore and wrecked near Peterhead, Aberdeenshire. Her crew were rescued by rocket apparatus. She was on a voyage from Aberdeen to Leith.
Margaret	United Kingdom	The ship was driven ashore at Ramsey, Isle of Man. Her crew were rescued. she was on a voyage from Whitehaven, Cumberland to Wicklow.
Nancy	United Kingdom	The ship was driven ashore at Wells-next-the-Sea, Norfolk.

== 7 March ==
List of shipwrecks: 7 March 1836
Ship	State	Description
Lord Abercromby	United Kingdom	The ship was driven ashore at Tarbert, Ayrshire. She was on a voyage from Limerick to Liverpool, Lancashire. Lord Abercromby was later refloated and resumed her voyage.
Galaxy	United States	The ship was wrecked on the Barnegat Shoals, off the coast of New Jersey. She was on a voyage from Canton, China to New York.

== 8 March ==
List of shipwrecks: 8 March 1836
Ship	State	Description
John and Thomas	United Kingdom	The sloop was driven ashore and wrecked on the Bar of Balmagan Shoal, off the coast of Kirkcudbrightshire. Her crew survived.

== 9 March ==
List of shipwrecks: 9 March 1836
Ship	State	Description
Cambrian	United Kingdom	The ship was destroyed by fire 60 nautical miles (110 km) off the coast of Belize. Her crew were rescued. She was on a voyage from New Orleans, Louisiana, United States to Liverpool, Lancashire.
Neptune	United Kingdom	The ship was abandoned off the coast of Kent. Her crew survived.
Venus	United Kingdom	The sloop capsized and sank off Pencarrow Head, Cornwall with the loss of all three crew. She was on a voyage from Exeter, Devon to Fowey, Cornwall.

== 10 March ==
List of shipwrecks: 10 March 1836
Ship	State	Description
Leipsic Packet	United Kingdom	The ship was driven ashore on Coquet Island, Northumberland. She was on a voyage from Rotterdam, South Holland, Netherlands to Leith, Lothian. Leipsic Packet was refloated on 21 March and taken in to Blyth, Northumberland.
Nymph	United Kingdom	The ship departed from Cardiff, Glamorgan for Alexandria, Egypt. No further trace, presumed foundered with the loss of all hands.
Salamander	United Kingdom	The ship was driven ashore and severely damaged at Lowestoft, Suffolk. She was refloated the next day.
Thornton	United Kingdom	The ship was driven ashore on the East Gar, at the mouth of the River Tees. Her crew were rescued.
Volant	Grand Duchy of Tuscany	The ship struck the pier at Chester, Pennsylvania, United States and sank. She was on a voyage from Livorno to Philadelphia, Pennsylvania.

== 11 March ==
List of shipwrecks: 11 March 1836
Ship	State	Description
Agnes	United Kingdom	The ship collided with Gladiator (United States) and sank in the English Channel off the Isle of Wight. She was on a voyage from London to Bristol, Gloucestershire.
Dispatch	United Kingdom	The ship sprang a leak and foundered in the North Sea 30 nautical miles (56 km) west north west of the Sunk Lightship ( Trinity House). Her crew were rescued. She was on a voyage from London to Amsterdam, North Holland, Netherlands.
Plough	United Kingdom	The schooner was driven ashore at Findhorn, Morayshire. She was on a voyage from Macduff, Aberdeenshire to Campbeltown, Argyllshire. Plough was refloated on 13 March and taken in to Findhorn.
Reliance	United Kingdom	The ship was driven ashore and wrecked at Rockaway, New York, United States. She was on a voyage from Bristol to New York City.

== 13 March ==
List of shipwrecks: 13 March 1836
Ship	State	Description
Betsey	United Kingdom	The ship ran ashore at Loch Ornsay.
Missouri	United States	The ship was wrecked in the Abaco Islands. She was on a voyage from Havre de Grâce, Seine-Inférieure, France to New Orleans, Louisiana.
Robert and Margaret	United Kingdom	The ship was reported to have foundered in the North Sea off Flamborough Head, Yorkshire. Her crew were rescued by Tay (United Kingdom). Robert and Margaret was subsequently disvovered derelict 25 leagues (75 nautical miles (139 km)) north north east of Cromer, Norfolk and was taken in to Great Yarmouth, Norfolk.

== 14 March ==
List of shipwrecks: 14 March 1836
Ship	State	Description
Ann	United Kingdom	The ship was driven ashore and wrecked on Sanday, Orkney Islands. Her crew were rescued. She was on a voyage from Memel, Prussia to Liverpool, Lancashire.
Agenoria	United Kingdom	The ship was wrecked on the Coleradoes. She was on a voyage from Mobile, Alabama, United States to Liverpool, Lancashire.
Black Diamond	United Kingdom	The ship ran aground on the Kentish Knock and was abandoned. Her crew were rescued.
Christian	United Kingdom	The ship was driven ashore at Killala, County Mayo. She was on a voyage from Ballina to Liverpool.
Harriet	United Kingdom	The ship was driven ashore at Ostend, West Flanders, Belgium, where she was subsequently wrecked. She was on a voyage from London to Ostend.
Vine	United Kingdom	The ship ran aground on the Newcombe Sand, in the North Sea and was abandoned. Her crew were rescued.

== 15 March ==
List of shipwrecks: 15 March 1836
Ship	State	Description
Cécile	France	The brig was driven ashore and wrecked east of Calais. Her eight crew were rescued. She was on a voyage from Cette, Hérault to Dunkirk, Nord.
Harriet	United Kingdom	The ship was driven ashore and wrecked east of Ostend, West Flanders, Belgium. She was on a voyage from London to Ostend.
Margaret	United Kingdom	The ship was driven ashore and wrecked at Bridgwater, Somerset with the loss of all hands. She was on a voyage from Newport, Monmouthshire to Bridgwater.
Moss Rose	United Kingdom	The ship was driven ashore at Bridgwater. Her crew were rescued.
Neptune	United Kingdom	The ship was driven ashore and wrecked at Bridgwater with the loss of all hands. She was on a voyage from Newport to Bridgwater.

== 16 March ==
List of shipwrecks: 16 March 1836
Ship	State	Description
Aid	United Kingdom	The ship was wrecked near Derbyhaven, Isle of Man.
Atalanta	United Kingdom	The ship was driven ashore in Donaha Bay. She was on a voyage from Trinidad to the Clyde. She floated off on 30 March and was taken in to the "Pier of Cuppa".
Clingard	United Kingdom	The ship was wrecked on the Gunfleet Sand, in the North Sea off the coast of Essex. Her crew were rescued. She was on a voyage from Goole, Yorkshire to London.
Mary Duffie	United Kingdom	The ship was driven ashore near "Borough Head". Her crew were rescued. She was on a voyage from Belfast, County Antrim to Whitehaven, Cumberland.
Telemachus	United Kingdom	The ship was lost on the Haisborough Sands, in the North Sea off the coast of Norfolk. Her crew were rescued.
Tyneside	United Kingdom	The ship was driven ashore and wrecked on Poel, Prussia.

== 17 March ==
List of shipwrecks: 17 March 1836
Ship	State	Description
Brothers	United Kingdom	The ship was driven ashore and wrecked at Formby Point, Lancashire. Her crew were rescued. She was on a voyage from Newry, County Antrim to Liverpool, Lancashire.
Chester	United Kingdom	The ship ran aground on the Hollywood Bank, in the Irish Sea off the coast of County Antrim.
Deux Louise	France	The ship was wrecked near Dénia, Spain. She was on a voyage from Cette, Hérault to Rouen, Seine-Inférieure.
Evangelistra	Trieste	The ship was driven ashore at the Rammekins Castle, Zeeland, Netherlands. She was on a voyage from Antwerp, Belgium to Trieste. Evangelistra was refloated on 19 March and taken in to Vlissingen, Zeeland.
Jeune Auguste	France	The ship was wrecked on the Kentish Knock with the loss of five of her crew. She was on a voyage from Newcastle upon Tyne, Northumberland, united Kingdom to Rouen.
Mercure	France	The ship was driven ashore in Étaples Bay. Her crew were rescued. She was on a voyage from Havre de Grâce, Seine-Inférieure to Newfoundland, British North America.
Russia	United States	The ship ran aground on the Caloot Bank, in the North Sea off the coast of Zeeland, Netherlands. She was on a voyage from New York to Antwerp, Belgium. She was refloated on 19 March and taken in to Vlissingen, Zeeland.
Scotia	United Kingdom	The ship ran aground on the Hollywood Bank.
Wilhelmina	Sweden	The ship sank near Kungsbacka.

== 18 March ==
List of shipwrecks: 18 March 1836
Ship	State	Description
Ann	United Kingdom	The ship was wrecked whilst on a voyage from Memel, Prussia to London. Her crew were rescued.
Dart	United Kingdom	The pilot boat collided with another and sank off the Isle of Wight. Her crew survived.
Magnificent	United Kingdom	The ship was wrecked at Ballycotton, County Cork. Her crew were rescued. She was on a voyage from Liverpool, Lancashire to Africa. The wreck was thoroughly plundered by the local inhabitants.
Sunbury	United Kingdom	The ship ran ashore at Rhosneigr, Caernarfonshire. She was on a voyage from Savannah, Georgia, United States to Liverpool.
Sarah	United Kingdom	The ship departed from Liverpool for Lisbon, Portugal. No further trace, presumed foundered with the loss of all hands.

== 19 March ==
List of shipwrecks: 19 March 1836
Ship	State	Description
Edinburgh	United Kingdom	The ship departed from Sydney, New South Wales for Liverpool, Lancashire. No further trace, presumed foundered with the loss of all hands.

== 20 March ==
List of shipwrecks: 20 March 1836
Ship	State	Description
Derwent	United Kingdom	The ship was driven ashore and wrecked at Workington, Cumberland.
Ragnkild	Norway	The ship was wrecked on South Uist, Outer Hebrides, United Kingdom. She was on a voyage from Christiana to La Rochelle, Charente-Maritime, France.
Swan	(United Kingdom of Great Britain and Ireland) New South Wales	The cutter was wrecked on Bondi Beach, Sydney with the loss of all on board.
Wilhelmina Magdalina	Russia	The ship was driven ashore on Gotland, Sweden. Her crew were rescued. She was on a voyage from London, United Kingdom to Reval.

== 21 March ==
List of shipwrecks: 21 March 1836
Ship	State	Description
Emma	United Kingdom	The ship was driven ashore and wrecked on the coast of Pará, Brazil with the loss of two of her crew. She was on a voyage from Maranhão to Pará.
Lord Abercormbie	United Kingdom	The ship was driven ashore at Sligo. She was on a voyage from London to Liverpool, Lancashire.
Mary	United Kingdom	The ship was wrecked at the entrance to Wyre Water. Her crew were rescued. She was on a voyage from Liverpool to Berbice.
Neptunus	United Kingdom	The ship was wrecked at Skagen, Denmark. She was on a voyage from Memel, Prussia to Newport, Monmouthshire.
Tertius	United Kingdom	The ship was wrecked near Exmouth, Devon. She was on a voyage from South Shields, County Durham to Topsham, Devon.
Trial	United Kingdom	The ship was abandoned in the Atlantic Ocean. Her crew were rescued. She was on a voyage from St. Ubes, Portugal to an English port.

== 22 March ==
List of shipwrecks: 22 March 1836
Ship	State	Description
Agnes	United Kingdom	The ship was driven ashore on Switha, Orkney Islands. Her crew were rescued. She was on a voyage from Inverness to Wick, Caithness.
Rebecca	United Kingdom	The ship was driven ashore near Madras, India.

== 23 March ==
List of shipwrecks: 23 March 1836
Ship	State	Description
Agnes	United Kingdom	The ship was driven ashore and wrecked at Demerara. She was on a voyage from Demerara to the Clyde.
Alonzo	United Kingdom	The ship ran aground and sank at Memel, Prussia.
Valiant	France	The ship foundered off the Île de Batz, Finistère. She was on a voyage from Rouen, Seine-Inférieure to Toulon, Var.

== 24 March ==
List of shipwrecks: 24 March 1836
Ship	State	Description
Antelope	United Kingdom	The ship struck the Saltear Rocks and was damaged. She was consequently beached near Whitby, Yorkshire. Antelope was on a voyage from South Shields, County Durham to Liverpool, Lancashire.
Brothers	United Kingdom	The ship ran aground at Maryport, Cumberland. She was on a voyage from Belfast, County Antrim to Maryport.
Sampson	United Kingdom	The ship was driven ashore off the coast of Glamorgan. She was on a voyage from Newport, Monmouthshire to Bristol, Gloucestershire.

== 25 March ==
List of shipwrecks: 25 March 1836
Ship	State	Description
Admiral Hugon	France	The ship was wrecked off Granville, Manche. She was on a voyage from Havre de Grâce, Seine-Inférieure to Granville.
Argo	United Kingdom	The ship ran aground on the East Knock, in the North Sea off the coast of Kent.
Blue Eyed Maid	United Kingdom	The ship sank in the Wallett, off the coast of Essex. Her crew were rescued.
James Laurie	United Kingdom	The ship was wrecked in the Abaco Islands with the loss of all hands and thirteen passengers. She was on a voyage from Nassau, Bahamas to Liverpool, Lancashire.
Vrow Rewenda	Kingdom of Hanover	The ship was driven ashore and wrecked at Helsingør, Denmark. She was on a voyage from Leer to Danzig.
Wilhelmina	Stolp	The ship was driven ashore and wrecked at Helsingør. She was on a voyage from Stolpmünde to a Norwegian port.

== 26 March ==
List of shipwrecks: 26 March 1836
Ship	State	Description
Bonnetta	United Kingdom	The ship sprang a leak foundered in the North Sea off Mundesley, Norfolk. Her crew were rescued.
Content	United Kingdom	The ship ran aground on the East Barrows Sand, in the North Sea off the coast of Essex. She was on a voyage from London to Sunderland, County Durham. Content was refloated on 28 March.
Criterion	United Kingdom	The ship was driven ashore at Calais, France. She was on a voyage from Newcastle upon Tyne, Northumberland to Rouen, Seine-Inférieure.
Ramoncita	Spain	The ship was wrecked on Grand Bahama. She was on a voyage from Havana, Cuba to St. Thomas, Virgin Islands.
Trocadéro	French Navy	Trocadéro. The Océan-class ship of the line was destroyed by fire at Toulon, Var, France.
Union	Belgium	The ship was driven ashore at Ostend, West Flanders. She was on a voyage from London, United Kingdom to Ostend. Union was refloated on 9 April and taken in to Ostend.

== 27 March ==
List of shipwrecks: 27 March 1836
Ship	State	Description
Adelida Maria	Netherlands	The ship ran aground on the Goodwin Sands, Kent, United Kingdom. She was on a voyage from Bordeaux, Gironde, France to Amsterdam, North Holland.
Alexandre	France	The ship was driven ashore near Paimbœuf, Loire-Inférieure.
Ann	United Kingdom	Two smacks of this name, both from Brixham, were driven ashore near Newlyn, Cornwall.
Ann and William	United Kingdom	The ship was driven ashore at Restronguet, Cornwall.
Catharina	Netherlands	The ship was driven ashore at Brixham, Devon, United Kingdom. She was on a voyage from Amsterdam, North Holland to Bayonne, Basses-Pyrénées, France.
Clyde	United Kingdom	The ship was driven ashore in Tor Bay.
Cores	United Kingdom	The ship was driven ashore at Falmouth, Cornwall.
Domus	United Kingdom	The ship was driven ashore at Penzance, Cornwall.
Eltheldred	United Kingdom	The ship was driven ashore at Brixham, Devon.
Gazelle	France	The ship was driven ashore near Paimbœuf.
Good Intent	United Kingdom	The ship was sighted off Dungeness, Kent whilst on a voyage from Seaham, County Durham to Portsmouth, Hampshire. No further trace, presumed foundered in the English Channel with the loss of all hands.
Harvest Home	United Kingdom	The ship capsized at Restronguet and was severely damaged.
Killigrew	United Kingdom	The ship was driven ashore at Famouth.
Lavinia	United Kingdom	The ship was driven ashore at Falmouth.
London Packet	United Kingdom	The ship was wrecked in Liverpool Bay with the loss of all hands. She was on a voyage from Liverpool, Lancashire to Antwerp, Belgium.
Lord Wellington	United Kingdom	The ship was driven ashore at Penzance.
Marie Catherine	France	The ship was driven ashore on Belle Île, Morbihan.
Mersey	United Kingdom	The ship was driven ashore in Tor Bay. She was refloated on 1 April and taken in to Torquay.
Minerva	United Kingdom	The ship was driven ashore at Restronguet.
Ocean	United Kingdom	The ship was driven ashore at Penzance.
Perseverance	United Kingdom	The ship was driven ashore at Penzance.
Richard	United Kingdom	The ship sank at St. Ives, Cornwall.
Sally	United Kingdom	The ship was driven ashore at Penzance.
Sarah	United Kingdom	The ship collided with Charles Grant (United Kingdom) and was then driven ashore and damaged at Brixham. Her crew were rescued by Charles Grant. Sarah was refloated on 1 April.
Speculation	United Kingdom	The ship was driven ashore at Penzance.
Speedy	United Kingdom	The ship was driven ashore at Penzance.
Susan	United Kingdom	The sloop was driven ashore and wrecked at Helford, Cornwall.
Stag	United Kingdom	The ship was driven ashore at Penzance.
Torvan	United Kingdom	The ship was driven ashore and wrecked at Penzance.
Traveller	United Kingdom	The brig was driven ashore and wrecked at Trefusis Point, Cornwall. Her crew survived. She was on a voyage from Port-au-Prince, Haiti to Antwerp, Belgium.
Virginie	France	The ship struck rocks and sank off Belle Île.

== 28 March ==
List of shipwrecks: 28 March 1836
Ship	State	Description
Cheviot	United Kingdom	The ship was driven ashore and wrecked 2 nautical miles (3.7 km) west of Exmouth, Devon with the loss of a pilot and eight of her eleven crew.
Diana Vernon	United Kingdom	The ship was driven ashore at Swanage, Dorset. She was on a voyage from Swanage to Poole, Dorset.
Eliza	United Kingdom	The sloop capsized and sank in the North Sea off the Bull Lightship ( Trinity House). She was refloated on 30 March and taken in to Grimsby, Lincolnshire on 2 April.
Eliza	France	The ship was driven ashore and wrecked at Guernsey, Channel Islands with the loss of all hands. She was on a voyage from Rouen, Seine-Inférieure to Bordeaux, Gironde.
Hannah	United Kingdom	The ship was wrecked at Orfordness, Suffolk with the loss of two of her crew. She was on a voyage from Blyth, Northumberland to London.
Jane	United Kingdom	The sloop ran aground on the Hook Sand, in the Bristol Channel.
Lovely Cruiser	United Kingdom	The ship was driven ashore at Swanage.
Navigateur	France	The ship was driven ashore and wrecked at Guernsey. Her crew were rescued. She was on a voyage from "Donai" to Toulon, Var.
HMS Quail	Royal Navy	The cutter capsized and was severely damaged in the Bay of Biscay with the loss of at least sixteen of her crew. She was subsequently righted and assisted in to Jersey, Channel Islands by Speedy (United Kingdom). HMS Quail was on a voyage from Falmouth, Cornwall to Lisbon, Portugal.
Rambler	United Kingdom	The ship was driven ashore and sank at Swanage.
Speedwell	United Kingdom	The ship was driven ashore at Start Point, Devon. She was on a voyage from Exeter, Devon to Glasgow, Renfrewshire.
Stephen	United Kingdom	The ship was driven ashore at Harwich, Essex. She was refloated on 30 March and taken in to Harwich for repairs.
Thomason	United Kingdom	The brig was abandoned in the North Sea off Woodbridge, Suffolk. Her crew were rescued.
Three Sisters	United Kingdom	The ship ran aground and capsized in the River Avon. She was on a voyage from Cork to Newport, Monmouthshire.
Trial	United Kingdom	The ship was abandoned in the Atlantic Ocean. Her crew were rescued by Rouennais (France). Trial was on a voyage from St. Ubes, Portugal to an English port.
Union	United Kingdom	The ship was abandoned in the North Sea off the coast of Essex. Her crew were rescued by Linnet (United Kingdom). Union was subsequently taken in to Harwich.

== 29 March ==
List of shipwrecks: 29 March 1836
Ship	State	Description
Active	United Kingdom	The ship was driven ashore near Sheringham, Norfolk. Her crew were rescued. She was on a voyage from Wisbech, Cambridgeshire to London. Active was refloated in May and sailed for Goole, Yorkshire.
Adair	United Kingdom	The ship was driven ashore at Sheringham, Norfolk. Her crew were rescued. She was on a voyage from Liverpool, Lancashire to London.
Advice	United Kingdom	The ship was driven ashore at Sheringham. She was on a voyage from Wisbech, Cambridgeshire to London.
Alfred	France	The ship was wrecked at Quiberon, Morbihan.
Aurora	United Kingdom	The ship foundered in the North Sea off Shoeburyness, Essex. Her crew were rescued by Æra (United Kingdom).
Belle Etoile	France	The ship was wrecked at Penhouët, Ille-et-Vilaine.
Bon Père	France	The ship sank at "Port Nevals", Morbihan.
Clair	France	The ship was driven ashore at L'Aiguillon-sur-Mer, Vendée. She was on a voyage from Bordeaux, Gironde to Buenos Aires, Argentina.
Deux Emilies	France	The ship was wrecked at Penhouët.
Diana	United Kingdom	The ship was driven ashore at Swanage, Dorset.
Eliza	United Kingdom	The ship was driven ashore and damaged at Selsey, Sussex. She was on a voyage from London to Sierra Leone. Eliza was refloated on 3 April and taken in to Littlehampton, Sussex.
Francis Depau	United States	The ship was driven ashore at Havre de Grâce, Seine-Inférieure, France.
Hawk	United Kingdom	The ship ran aground at Chichester, Sussex and was beached. She was on a voyage from Sunderland, County Durham to Chichester.
Liberty	United Kingdom	The ship was driven ashore on Selsey Bill, Sussex. She was on a voyage from Newcastle upon Tyne, Northumberland to Bridport, Dorset.
Lively	United Kingdom	The schooner was driven ashore at Swanage.
London Packet	United Kingdom	The ship was wrecked off Spencer's Gut with the loss of all hands. She was on a voyage from Liverpool, Lancashire to Antwerp, Belgium.
Malabar	France	The ship was driven ashore at L'Aiguillon-sur-Mer. She was on a voyage from India to Bordeaux.
Mary Pester, or Mary Porter	United Kingdom	The ship was driven ashore in Studland Bay. She was on a voyage from London to Belfast, County Antrim. The ship was refloated on 30 March and taken in to Brownsea Island, Dorset.
Melville	British East India Company	The East Indiaman was driven ashore at Torre Abbey, Devon. All on board were rescued.
Mould	United Kingdom	The ship struck the Spaniard Sand, in the North Sea and capsized. Her crew were rescued. She was on a voyage from Newry, County Antrim to London. She was subsequently driven ashore and wrecked at Whitstable, Kent.
Neva	France	The ship was wrecked at La Tremblade, Charente-Maritime. Her crew were rescued. She was on a voyage from Porto, Portugal to Bordeaux, Gironde.
Thomas M. Lyon	United Kingdom	The ship was abandoned in the English Channel 15 nautical miles (28 km) west of Guernsey, Channel Islands. Her crew were rescued by Ditto (United Kingdom).
Valiant	France	The ship sank at "Port Nevals".
Vincent	France	The ship was driven ashore and sank on the coast of Morbihan. She was on a voyage from "Briault" to Marseille, Bouches-du-Rhône.

== 30 March ==
List of shipwrecks: 30 March 1836
Ship	State	Description
Amy	United Kingdom	The ship was driven ashore in Irvine Bay. She was on a voyage from Greenock, Renfrewshire to Troon, Ayrshire and Londonderry.
Edinburgh	United Kingdom	The barque was destroyed by fire in the Pacific Ocean (44°20′S 163°00′E). Her crew were rescued. She was on a voyage from Sydney, New South Wales to Liverpool, Lancashire.
Eliza	United Kingdom	The ship was driven ashore and wrecked at Selsey Bill, Sussex. She was on a voyage from London to Sierra Leone.

== 31 March ==
List of shipwrecks: 31 March 1836
Ship	State	Description
Active	United Kingdom	The ship was driven ashore north of Dunmore East, County Waterford. Her crew were rescued. She was on a voyage from Strangford, County Antrim to Liverpool, Lancashire.
Callinogue	United Kingdom	The schooner was wrecked at the mouth of the River Ribble with the loss of all hands. She was on a voyage from Creetown, Wigtownshire to Liverpool or vice versa.
Joseph	Belgium	The ship was driven ashore at Ostend, West Flanders. She was on a voyage from St. Ubes, Portugal to Ostend. Joseph was later refloated and taken in to Ostend.
Mary	United Kingdom	The ship was driven ashore at Rossall Point, Lancashire. Her crew were rescued. She was on a voyage from Liverpool to Berbice.
Mayflower	United Kingdom	The ship was driven ashore at Bowmore, Islay, Inner Hebrides. She was on a voyage from Glasgow, Renfrewshire to Ballyshannon, County Donegal.
Scottish Pedestrian	United Kingdom	The ship struck the Plough Rock, off Lindisfarne and sank. Her crew were rescued. She was on a voyage from Newcastle upon Tyne, Northumberland to Aberdeen.

== Unknown date ==
List of shipwrecks: Unknown date in March 1836
Ship	State	Description
Ann	United Kingdom	The ship sank in the Prince's Dock, Liverpool, Lancashire.
Ardana	Kingdom of Sardinia	The brig was driven ashore and wrecked at Matazan, Morocco.
Baptiste de Nantes	France	The ship was abandoned in the English Channel before 1 April. She was taken in to Jersey, Channel Islands on that date.
Braemer	United Kingdom	The ship capsized in the North Sea off Cley-next-the-Sea, Norfolk. She was later towed to Blakeney, Norfolk.
Britannia	United Kingdom	The ship ran aground on the Cullness Rocks. She was refloated on 5 March and taken in to Arbroath, Forfarshire.
Caroline	United Kingdom	The ship was driven ashore east of Calais, France before 28 March. She was later refloated and taken in to Dover, Kent.
Castle Huntly	United Kingdom	The ship was driven ashore in Tor Bay.
Cheshire	United Kingdom	The full-rigged ship was driven ashore in a hurricane at Mauritius before 8 March. She was later refloated.
Countess of Mansfield	United Kingdom	The ship was wrecked neat St David's Head, Pembrokeshire.
Coventry	United Kingdom	The brig was driven ashore at Point aux Forges, Mauritius before 8 March.
Dagerood	Netherlands	The ship was driven ashore at Huisduinen, North Holland. She was on a voyage from Surinam to Amsterdam, North Holland.
Evangilista	Trieste	The ship was driven ashore near Rammekins Castle, Zeeland, Netherlands. She was on a voyage from Antwerp, Belgium to Trieste.
Ferdinand	France	The barque was driven ashore at Point-aux-Forges, Mauritius before 8 March.
Flag-buoy	France	The ship was driven ashore in a hurricane at Cordan, Mauritius before 8 March.
Ganges	France	The ship was driven ashore near Fort George, Mauritius before 8 March.
Harriet	France	The brig was driven ashore in a hurricane at Mauritius before 8 March.
Hawk	France	The ship was driven ashore in a hurricane at Mauritius before 8 March.
Iona	United Kingdom	The brig was driven ashore in a hurricane at Mauritius before 8 March.
Jeune Irmisse	France	The full-rigged ship was driven ashore near Fort George, Mauritius before 8 March.
Lady Amherst	United Kingdom	The ship departed from Cork for Saint John, New Brunswick, British North America. No further trace, presumed foundered with the loss of all hands and 101 passengers.
Leven Castle	United Kingdom	The ship ran aground on the Brazil Bank, in Liverpool Bay and sank. Her crew were rescued she was on a voyage from Liverpool to Belfast, County Antrim.
Maria	United Kingdom	The ship was wrecked near Memel. Prussia before 22 March.
Mary	United Kingdom	The ship was driven ashore at Fishguard, Pembrokeshire. She was on a voyage from Newry, County Antrim to Bristol, Gloucestershire.
Nelly	United Kingdom	The ship foundered in the North Sea with the loss of all hands. She was on a voyage from London to Perth.
Nelson	United Kingdom	The schooner was driven ashore in a hurricane at Mauritius before 8 March.
Neptune	United Kingdom	The ship was abandoned in the Atlantic Ocean before 4 March. She was on a voyage from Sicily to London.
Passe Par Tout	France	The ship was wrecked in a hurricane at Mauritius before 8 March.
Priscilla	(United Kingdom of Great Britain and Ireland) British North America	The ship was abandoned in the Atlantic Ocean before 30 March.
Rachael	United Kingdom	The ship was lost at Algorta, Spain. She was on a voyage from London to Bilbao, Spain.
Russia	United Kingdom	The ship ran aground on the Callott Bank, in the North Sea.
Solide	France	The schooner was driven ashore in a hurricane at Mauritius before 8 March.
Star of Brunswick	United Kingdom	The ship was driven ashore at Workington, Cumberland. She was refloated on 3 March and taken in to Workington.
Susan	United Kingdom	The ship was driven ashore and wrecked at Milford Haven, Pembrokeshire.
Themistocles	Netherlands	The ship was lost near Ipsara Island. She was on a voyage from Constantinople, Ottoman Empire to Amsterdam, North Holland.
Three Sisters	United Kingdom	The ship was driven ashore and capsized at Bristol, Gloucestershire.
Unity	United Kingdom	The ship foundered in the North Sea with the loss of all hands. She was on a voyage from London to Perth.
Victoire et Lise	France	The barque was driven ashore near Fort George, Mauritius before 8 March. She was later refloated.
Victory	United Kingdom	The ship was driven ashore near Fishguard. She was on a voyage from Wakefield, Yorkshire to Swansea, Glamorgan.
Wilhelm	France	The ship was driven ashore in the "Bay de Toupasses", Finistère a few days before 17 March.
William	United Kingdom	The ship was driven ashore at Corton, Suffolk. She was refloated on 18 March and taken in to Great Yarmouth, Norfolk.
