= Lady Carrington (1809 ship) =

Ship in East India Company's service

United Kingdom
- Name: Lady Carrington
- Owner: 1809:Anderson & Swan; EIC voyage #2: Robert Anderson; EIC voyage #3-4:John Campbell; 1820:Ward
- Builder: Hilhouse, Sons & Co., Bristol
- Launched: 8 April 1809
- Fate: Broken up 1823

General characteristics
- Tons burthen: 1809:471, or 472, or 493 (bm); 1811: 564, or 56440/94,, or 602 (bm)
- Length: Overall:124 ft 10 in (38.0 m); Keel:103 ft 5 in (31.5 m)
- Beam: 32 ft 0 in (9.8 m)
- Depth of hold: 19 ft 0 in (5.8 m)
- Complement: 1809:36; 1812:55
- Armament: 1809: 18 × 9-pounder guns; 1809:14 × 12-pounder carronades; 1809:14 × 12-pounder + 6 × 9-pounder carronades; 1812:14 ×12&9-pounder guns
- Notes: Three decks

Lady Carrington was launched at Bristol in 1809. In an apparently short and uneventful career, she made five voyages for the British East India Company (EIC) before she was broken up in 1823.

== Career ==
On 12 July 1809, Messrs. Anderson and Swan, sole owners of Lady Carrington, offered her services to the EIC. The government had already chartered her to carry troops and stores to the Cape of Good Hope. Anderson and Swan proposed to send her from the Cape to Bengal to bring back cargo for the EIC at a rate of £16 6s per ton. The EIC requested some upgrading of Lady Carrington and accepted the offer.

Lady Carrington appeared in the 1810 volumes of Lloyd's Register (LR) and the Register of Shipping (RS) with somewhat jumbled and inconsistent information. Lloyd's Register showed her master as W. Atkins, changing to J. Sayton, her owner as Campbell, changing to Anderson & Co., and her trade London–Cape of Good Hope. The Register of Shipping, published slightly later, showed her master as W. Atkins, her owner as Swan, and her trade as London–Bengal.

1st EIC voyage (1809–1810): Captain Walter Atkins acquired a letter of marque on 14 July 1809. He sailed from the Downs, bound for Bengal and Madras. Lady Carrington reached the Cape of Good Hope on 17 January 1810 and arrived at Calcutta on 28 March. Homeward bound, she was at Culpee (on the Hooghly River on 5 June and reached Madras on 10 July. From there she reached St Helena on 30 September and arrived back at the Downs on 5 December.

In 1811 Lady Carrington underwent some repairs and lengthening.

2nd EIC voyage (1812–1813): Captain William Hawkey acquired a letter of marque on 30 January 1812. He sailed from Portsmouth on 10 March 1812, bound for Bombay and Bengal. Lady Carrington reached Bombay on 11 Jul, Madras on 24 August, and Balasore on 20 September; she arrived at Calcutta on 26 October. Homeward bound, she was at Saugor on 27 January 1813, and Madras again on 15 March. She reached St Helena on 30 July and arrived at the Downs on 7 November.

3rd EIC voyage (1814–1815): Captain Henry Becher sailed from Portsmouth on 8 June 1814, bound for Bengal. Lady Carrington was at Madeira on 23 June and Mauritius on 15 October, and arrived at Kidderpore on 8 January 1815. Homeward bound, she was at Saugor on 17 March. She stopped at Bencoolen on 25 June and Mauritius on 16 August. She reached the Cape on 26 September and St Helena on 14 October, and arrived at the Downs on 22 December.

4th EIC voyage (1816–1817): Captain Dugald MacDougall sailed from the Downs on 17 May 1816, bound for Bengal. Lady Carrington was at Madeira on 29 May and arrived at Calcutta on 8 October. Homeward bound, she was at Saugor on 22 February 1817, reached St Helena on 29 May, and arrived at the Downs on 30 July.

In 1818–1819 Lady Carrington did not sail for the EIC. She sailed to St Helena, the Cape, and Bengal under a license from the EIC, but not under the EIC's auspices. A list of licensed ships shows Lady Carrington, A.J. Moore, master, J. Campbell, ship's husband, sailing for Bengal on 20 January 1818.

5th EIC voyage (1820–1821): Captain Thomas Erasmus Ward sailed from the Downs on 4 May 1820, bound for Madras and Bengal. Lady Carrington reached Madras on 14 September and arrived at Kidderpore on 7 November. Homeward bound, she was at Saugor on 11 January, reaching Maulipatam on 28 February and Madras on 9 March. She was at Algoa Bay on 27 May and Simon's Bay on 5 July. She reached St Helena on 1 August and arrived at the Downs on 30 September.

== Fate ==
On 19 September 1823, Lady Carrington's registration was cancelled, demolition having been completed.
