= Fame (1779 ship) =

History

Great Britain
- Name: Fame
- Owner: 1779:A. Clibourn; 1782:Long & Co.; 1796:Calvert & Co.
- Builder: Hillhouse, Bristol
- Launched: 1779
- Fate: Last listed in Lloyd's Register in 1807

General characteristics
- Tons burthen: 420, or 450, or 454 (bm)
- Propulsion: Sail
- Armament: 1779:12 × 9-pounder + 6 × 4-pounder guns; 1782:10 × 9-pounder + 6 × 6-pounder guns; 1799:4 × 6-pounder + 8 × 4-pounder guns; 1800:2 × 9-pounder + 8 × 6-pounder + 10 × 4-pounder guns; 1802:6 × 10 × 6-pounder guns + 10 × 4-pounder guns
- Notes: Three decks

Fame was built at Bristol in 1779 as a West Indiaman. Between 1797 and 1799 she made one or two voyages to India for the British East India Company (EIC). She then made two voyages to Africa as a slave ship in the triangular trade in enslaved people. On her return from Africa she resumed her trading with Jamaica. She is last listed in Lloyd's Register (LR) in 1807.

== Career ==
Fame entered Lloyd's Register in 1779 with J. Burrows, master, and trade Bristol transport. In 1782 her master changed from Burrows to J. Aldis, and her owner from A. Clibbourn to Long & Co. Her trade remained Bristol to Jamaica. In 1789 her master was J. Aldis, changing to J. Carr, her owner Long & Co., and her trade London—Jamaica.

In 1796 Calvert & Co. purchased Fame from Long & Co. In connection with the transfer of ownership, Fame underwent a thorough repair.

=== EIC voyage(s) ===
Captain Henry Liddell sailed from Portsmouth on 31 July 1796, bound for Madras and Calcutta. Fame reached Vizagaptam on 12 January 1797, and arrived at Calcutta on 10 February. On her homeward journey she was at Simon's Bay on 22 July, reached Saint Helena on 11 September, and arrived at Erith on 19 September. Another report has Fame, Captain Henry Liddell, sailing to Madras and Calcutta between 22 February 1796 and 18 December 1797, and then sailing Bombay and Bengal between 22 March 1798 and 30 April 1799. A third source has Fame, Richard Owen, master, returning from Bombay on 3 May 1799.

=== Enslaving voyages ===
Fame made two enslaving voyages.

1st enslaving voyage (1799-1800): Captain Diedrick Woolbert sailed from London on 27 November 1799. Lloyd's List (LL) reported on 27 December that Fame, Woolbert, master, had put into Sheerness, having lost anchors and cables. By 3 December she was at Deal, preparing to sail. Woolbert purchased captives at Cape Coast Castle and delivered 384 captives to Demerara on 23 December 1800.

2nd enslaving voyage (1801–1802): Captain Woolbert sailed from London on 22 September 1801. He commenced purchasing captives at Cape Coast Castle on 18 January 1802. He also purchased captives at Accra. He delivered 380 captives to Havana on 1 May 1802.

Fame then left the slave trade. On 4 January 1802, Fame, Woolbert, master, arrived at Dover from Rotterdam.

== Information from the Registers ==
The table below comes primarily from Lloyd's Register ("LR"), though it also contains information from the Register of Shipping where volumes are available and provide information that is different from that in Lloyd's Register. Entries in either register are only as accurate as owners chose to make them.

Year	Master	Owner	Trade	Source & notes
1795	J. Aldis	Long & Co.	London—Jamaica	LR
1796	J. Aldis; H. Liddell	Long & Co. Calvert & Co.	London—Jamaica; London—(illegible)	LR
1797	H. Liddell	Calvert & Co.	London—East Indies	LR
1798	H.Liddell; R. Owen	Calvert & Co.	London—India	LR
1799	R.Owen; Jameson; Woolbert	Calvert & Co.	London—India; Cork transport	LR
1800	Jameson; Woolburt	Calvert & Co.	London transport	RS
1800	Woolbert	Calvert & Co.	London—Africa	LR
1801	Woolbert	Calvert & Co.	London—Africa	LR
1802	Woolbert	Calvert & Co.	London—Africa	LR
1804	Woolbert	Calvert & Co.	London—Africa	LR
1804	Woolbert	Calvert & Co.	London—Jamaica	RS
1805	Woolbert	Calvert & Co.	London—Africa	LR
1805	Woolbert	Calvert & Co.	London—Jamaica	RS
1806	Woolbert	Calvert & Co.	London—Africa	LR; thorough repair 1796 and repairs 1798
1807	Woolbert	Calvert & Co.	London—Africa	LR; thorough repair 1796 and repairs 1798
