= Super Deluxe (band) =

Super Deluxe is an American pop/punk rock band.

The band started in 1993 in Seattle, following in the footsteps of The Posies and The Goo Goo Dolls, soon becoming a fixture in the northwest music scene. The band consisted of Lead Vocalist and Guitarist, Braden Blake, Backup Vocalist and Lead Guitarist, John Kirsch, Bassist, Jake Nesheim and Drummer, Chris Lockwood.

Warner Bros ‘Revolution’ label signed the band, releasing their first album Famous to critical acclaim. The first single, "She Came On" was named 'power pop record of the year' by Melody Maker, and was featured in the movies, Kingpin and Marvin's Room (1996). The band also released their Christmas EP, Electric Holiday that same year, with one of their most popular tracks, "All I Wanted Was a Skateboard", being featured on the Home Alone 3 Soundtrack.

Rolling Stone called Super Deluxe "equal parts Cheap Trick, Big Star and Redd Kross." The band toured in support of Famous and its follow-up, Via Satellite, which was released in 1997.

Super Deluxe released their 3rd full-length album, Surrender, in December 2005 (The Control Group label). Lead singer of the band, Braden Blake later released his 1st solo album, A Year in Pajamas in mid-2004.

== Band members ==
Current

- Braden Blake - Vocals, Guitar
- John Kirsch - Guitar, Vocals
- David M. Roberts - Bass, Vocals
- Chris Lockwood - Drums

Other members

- Ira Merrill - Guitar, Vocals
- Jake Nesheim - Bass
- Darius Minwalla - Drums

== Discography ==
Electric Holiday

1. "All I Wanted Was a Skateboard"
2. "Up On The Housetop"
3. "Johnny's Gone Sleddin' with Queen"
4. "God Rest Ye Merry Gentlemen"

Famous (Oct 1995)

1. "Lizadrin"
2. "Famous"
3. "She Came On"
4. "Love Her Madly"
5. "Flustered"
6. "Disappearing"
7. "Johnny's Gone Fishin'"
8. "Holly's Dream Vacation"
9. "Smile"
10. "Suitcases"
11. "Sunshine For Now"
12. "Give A Little Bit" (Bonus Track - Japanese Release Only)

Via Satellite (Jul 1997)

1. "Your Pleasure's Mine"
2. "Lost In Your Failures"
3. "Farrah Fawcett"
4. "Love Liquid Wraparound"
5. "Alright"
6. "Commonplace"
7. "Divine"
8. "What's Up With Me"
9. "One In A Million"
10. "New Variations"
11. "Half Asleep"
12. "I Can See"
13. "Suicide Doll"
14. "Years Ago"
15. "Rock And Roll" (Included As A Bonus Track Hidden in Track 14 "Years Ago")
16. "Via Satellite" (Japanese Version Only - Demo Song)

i'm the musician

1. "No Merry Christmas"
2. "A Bittersweet Noel"
3. "Tommy"
4. "Dominic the Christmas Donkey"
5. "A Wonderful Christmas Time"
6. "O Come Emanuel"

Surrender (Dec 2005)

1. "Come Down"
2. "Knockout"
3. "Joie de Vivre"
4. "Upsidedown"
5. "Shoot"
6. "Know Your Enemy"
7. "Safe And Sorry"
8. "Enough Is Enough"
9. "She's Got It"
10. "Easy Way Out"
11. "Get Off"
12. "Moonage Daydream" (Included in Japanese Version Only - David Bowie Cover)

Lolita EP (March 2005)

1. "Alysson's Gone"
2. "Knockout"
3. "Give It Up"
4. "Enough Is Enough"
5. "Lolita"

Super Deluxe Music (Japan Release Only)

1. "Famous"
2. "Give A Little Bit"
3. "On Lisa"
4. "Virnana (1234)"
5. "All I Wanted Was a Skate" (UK Remix)
6. "Famous" (Remix)
7. "She Came On" (Demo Version)
8. "Wilted and Faded"

Electric Holiday 2007 (Australian Release)

1. "All I Wanted Was a Skateboard"
2. "Up On The Housetop"
3. "Johnny's Gone Sleddin' with Queen"
4. "A Bittersweet Noel"
5. "God Rest Ye Merry Gentlemen"
6. "Famous"
7. Video: Home Alone 3 Scene feat. "All I Wanted Was a Skateboard"
8. Video: "All I Wanted Was a Skateboard" (Music Video)
