= Famous (Super Deluxe album) =

Studio album by Super Deluxe
- Released: 1995
- Label: Tim/Kerr
- Producer: Martin Feveyer, Gavin Guss, Super Deluxe

Super Deluxe chronology
Electric Holiday EP (1995)	Famous (1995)	Via Satellite (1997)

Famous is the debut album by the American band Super Deluxe, released in 1995. The album was remastered and rereleased the following year by the Warner Bros. Records subsidiary Revolution Records, with an extra track. The band supported the album with a North American tour.

== Production ==
The album was produced by Martin Feveyer, Gavin Guss and Super Deluxe. The former Posie Mike Musberger contributed percussion to some tracks. The band's demo tape of Famous served as the Tim/Kerr release. "Holly's Dream Vacation" is about Holly Golightly.

== Critical reception ==
Professional ratings
Review scores
Source	Rating
AllMusic	4/5 stars
The Encyclopedia of Popular Music	3/5 stars
Fort Worth Star-Telegram	2.5/5 stars
Los Angeles Times	3/4 stars
MusicHound Rock: The Essential Album Guide	3/5 stars
USA Today	3.5/4 stars
Vancouver Sun	3/4 stars

Trouser Press wrote: "On its brief, splendid debut, the young Seattle foursome Super Deluxe demonstrates a clear awareness of ’90s noise but primarily brings Squeeze-like harmonic subtlety to winning originals rooted in that nonexistent netherworld between the original British Invaders and their softhearted new wave receptors." The Los Angeles Times concluded that Super Deluxe "has a knack for mixing and matching elements from the last three decades of English pop."

USA Today thought that "the honey-coated tunes of Braden Blake and John Kirsh are stirred and shaken by feverish rhythms and punchy guitars, then topped by creamy harmonies." The Albuquerque Journal called the band "tuneful in its own right," but wrote that the album "gets downright boring as [it] plods along after an energetic opening." The Austin American-Statesman opined that "the singer and his many voice overdubs recall the Rembrandts, while the guitars are dull, dull, dull."

AllMusic praised the "upbeat, sugary songs bursting with catchy hooks and sing-along choruses."

== Track listing ==
No.	Title	Length
1.	"Lizadrin"
2.	"Famous"
3.	"She Came On"
4.	"Love Her Madly"
5.	"Flustered"
6.	"Disappearing"
7.	"Johnny's Gone Fishin'"
8.	"Holly's Dream Vacation"
9.	"Smile"
10.	"Suitcases"
11.	"Sunshine for Now"
