= Reliance (1831 ship) =

History

United Kingdom
- Name: Reliance
- Owner: George Hilhouse and Charles Hill, merchants and co-partners, trading as G. Hilhouse and Co., Bristol.
- Launched: 1831
- Fate: Wrecked 10 March 1836

General characteristics
- Tons burthen: 335, or 33747/94 (bm)
- Length: 108 ft 0 in (32.9 m)
- Beam: 26 ft 3 in (8.0 m)
- Notes: Three masts and two decks

Reliance was built at Bristol in 1831. She appeared in Lloyd's Register (LR) in 1832 with G.Forester, master, Hilhouse, owner, and trade Bristol–Trinidad.

Reliance was driven ashore and wrecked at Rockaway, New York, on 10 March 1836. She was on a voyage from Bristol to New York City.
