= Fame (1815 ship) =

History

United Kingdom
- Name: Fame
- Builder: John Goodie, Quebec
- Launched: 1815
- Fate: Last listed in 1833

General characteristics
- Tons burthen: 204, or 205 (bm)

Fame was built in 1815 at Quebec. She transferred her registry to Great Britain in 1819. She traded widely and was last listed in 1833.

== Career ==
Fame first appeared in Lloyd's Register (LR) in 1816.

Fame was re-registered at Greenock in 1819.

Year	Master	Owner	Trade	Source
1816	Abrams	Capt. & Co.	Greenock–Quebec	LR
1820	R.Frew	Capt & Co.	Greenock–Jamaica; Greenock–New Orleans	LR
1822	R.Frew; P.Scott	Captain; Thompson & Co.	Greenock–Leghorn; Greenock–St Thomas	
1824	D.Neil	Thompson	Greenock–Trinidad	LR
1826	P.Smith	Thompson & Co.	London–Sierra Leone	LR
1828	M'Kinley	Captain & Co.	Greenock–Honduras	LR
1830				LR – not listed
1831	Watson	Walkinshaw	Liverpool–New South Wales	LR
1833	Watson	Walkinshaw	Liverpool–New South Wales	LR; "wants repair"
