= Fame (1803 ship) =

History

United Kingdom
- Name: Fame
- Builder: Matthew Smith, Calcutta
- Launched: 1803, or 1802
- Fate: Wrecked 27 July 1807

General characteristics
- Tons burthen: 500 (bm)

Fame was built by Matthew Smith at Calcutta in 1803. In 1803 her managing owners were Archer and Smith. On 27 July 1807 Fame was lost on the Eastern Sea Reef. Captain Joseph Latour and all aboard took to her boats and were saved.
