= Famous (Mason Ramsey song) =

2018 debut single by Mason Ramsey

Single by Mason Ramsey

from the EP Famous
- Released: April 27, 2018
- Genre: Country; country pop
- Length: 3:12
- Label: Atlantic; Big Loud
- Songwriters: Mason Ramsey; Tyler Hubbard; Corey Crowder; Sarah Buxton; Canaan Smith
- Producer: Joey Moi

Mason Ramsey singles chronology
"Famous" (2018)	"Lovesick Blues" (2018)

"Famous" is the debut single by American singer Mason Ramsey, released on April 27, 2018 by Atlantic and Big Loud Records. The song was produced by Joey Moi, and written by Mason Ramsey, Tyler Hubbard, Corey Crowder, Sarah Buxton and Canaan Smith. It was serviced to country radio on April 30.

== Composition ==
"Famous" blends traditional country with modern styles, which a Rolling Stone writer compared to Luke Bryan. Lyrically, the song narrates a pre-adolescent romance.

== Chart performance ==
"Famous" entered at number 62 on the US Billboard Hot 100 and at number 4 on Hot Country Songs. It debuted with 10.8 million US streams and 19,000 sold in its first week.

== Live performances ==
Ramsey performed the song at the Stagecoach Festival, along with his cover of "Lovesick Blues", during Florida Georgia Line's set.

== Critical reception ==
The critical reaction to the song was positive, with praise for Ramsey's successful transition to serious country music.

== Charts ==
=== Weekly charts ===
Chart (2018)	Peak position
New Zealand Heatseekers (Recorded Music NZ)	4
UK Singles (Official Charts)	100
US Billboard Hot 100	62
US Hot Country Songs (Billboard)	4

=== Year-end charts ===
Chart (2018)	Position
US Hot Country Songs (Billboard)	91

== Certifications ==
Certifications for "Famous"
Region	Certification	Certified units/sales
Canada (Music Canada)	Gold	40,000^{‡}
United States (RIAA)	Gold	500,000^{‡}
^{‡} Sales+streaming figures based on certification alone.
