= Mason Ramsey =

American singer (born 2006)

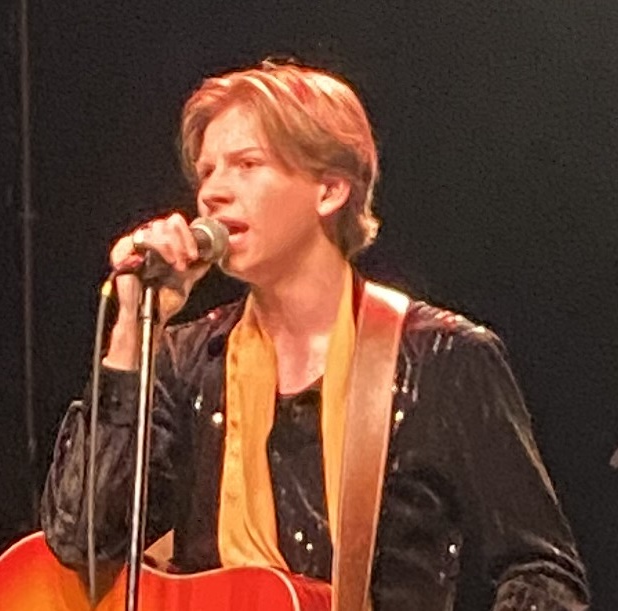
- Ramsey in 2024

Background information
- Born: Mason Blake Ramsey; November 16, 2006 (age 19); Oklahoma, U.S.
- Genres: Country; Americana
- Occupations: Singer; songwriter
- Years active: 2018–present
- Labels: Atlantic; Big Loud; Sandlot
- Website: masonramsey.com

Mason Blake Ramsey (born November 16, 2006) is an American country music singer. In March 2018, after gaining Internet fame from a viral video of him yodeling "Lovesick Blues" by Hank Williams at a Walmart, Ramsey was signed to Big Loud and Atlantic.

== Early life ==
Mason Blake Ramsey was born in Oklahoma on November 16, 2006, and raised in Golconda, Illinois by his grandparents. He later described their home as a “time capsule,” without internet access but filled with classic records.

His grandfather hosted large community karaoke barbecues, where Ramsey was participating by age three, having begun to pick up singing before he could speak in full sentences. Ramsey has said that regularly hearing Hank Williams’ music—his grandfather’s favorite—inspired him to start singing at a very young age.

Before he was 4, Ramsey went on to receive a standing ovation for his rendition of "I Saw The Light" at the Carson Center, headlined by Josh Turner. He also made his first public performance at the Kentucky Opry shortly after turning four. He became a regular performer at the Kentucky Opry in Draffenville and gained local recognition, occasionally being invited to join visiting artists when they performed in the area.

He later went on to open for Gene Watson at age five, and appeared on stage with Kenny Rogers at seven. He also opened for the Bellamy Brothers. In addition to formal performances, Ramsey frequently sang for residents at local nursing homes. He was also known to continue singing in informal settings, including during visits to Walmart.

In January 2017, a video of Ramsey at age 10 performing an a cappella version of “Hey Good Lookin’” while sitting in a shopping cart at a Walmart in Paducah, Kentucky went viral, accumulating over 3.4 million views on YouTube.

== Career ==
In March 2018, 11-year-old Ramsey was seen on camera singing "Lovesick Blues" in a Walmart store in Harrisburg, Illinois. Within a few days, videos of his performance collectively garnered over 25 million views, and he became a viral sensation and internet meme. Ramsey's performance sparked new interest in Hank Williams's 70-year-old recording of the song, and in March, Rolling Stone reported that Spotify's Viral 50 chart for the U.S. ranked Williams's "Lovesick Blues" at number three (and number four around the globe).

As a result of his newfound fame, Ramsey made an appearance on The Ellen DeGeneres Show. When he said that his dream was to appear on the Grand Ole Opry one day, DeGeneres surprised Ramsey by saying he had been booked for the following weekend. On April 13, 2018, American DJ Whethan brought Ramsey out during his set at the 2018 Coachella Valley Music and Arts Festival in Indio, California.

In late April, he signed a record deal with Atlantic Records and Nashville-based label Big Loud. His debut single "Famous" entered at number 62 on the US Billboard Hot 100, while the EP debuted in the top 10 of Billboard's Heatseekers Albums chart at number 7. Ramsey performed iconic number 1 songs on the Billboard Hot 100 chart's 60th anniversary; starting from the 1960s, he sang hit songs by Mariah Carey, Billy Joel, Paul McCartney, Stevie Wonder, Celine Dion, The Monkees, The Jackson 5, Whitney Houston, Beyoncé, and Adele. On June 8, 2018, he released his cover of "Lovesick Blues".

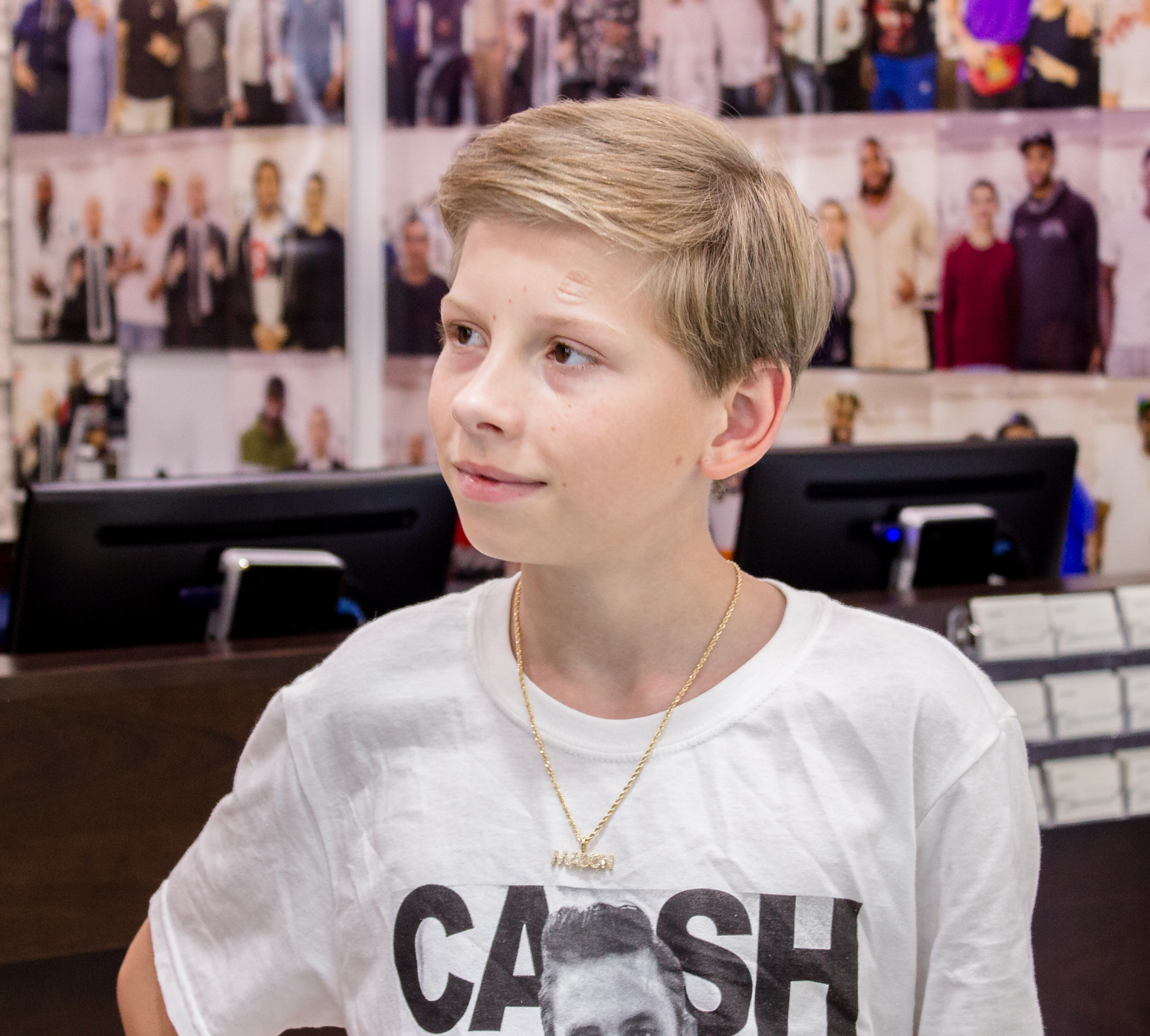
Ramsey in 2019

On June 29, 2018, he released his cover version of "Jambalaya (On the Bayou)", and another new song "The Way I See It". On July 20, 2018, he released his debut extended play (EP), Famous. He was featured on Lil Nas X's third "Old Town Road" remix along with Billy Ray Cyrus and Young Thug, and joined Lil Nas X on stage to perform it at the 62nd Annual Grammy Awards. In the same year, he was recognized as one of the YMCA's 15 under 15 for his contributions to country music.

After a hiatus since 2019, he did a Burger King commercial in which he yodels about cow-based methane emissions in 2020.

In 2022, Ramsey's song "Before I Knew It", from his 2019 EP Twang, gained popularity on TikTok after he featured it in several videos updating followers on his life, revealing that he was working at a local restaurant in his hometown making pizzas and subs.

On June 30, 2023, Ramsey released the single "Reasons to Come Home", his first new music release in nearly four years. On August 4, 2023, Ramsey released his second single that year, "She Got It Outta Me". On September 15, 2023, Ramsey released another song, "Next Right Thing", which, along with the previous two tracks released earlier in the year, featured on his new EP.

All three songs released in 2023, along with two new songs "All I Wanna Be" and "Falls Into Place" were released as part of the new EP Falls Into Place on October 20, 2023, after four years from the release of the previous EP. On November 10, 2023, Ramsey released a Christmas country cover of the song "Run Rudolph Run".

On January 26, 2024, Ramsey released a new single, "Here All Day", followed by "Blue Over You" released on February 23, 2024. On April 26, 2024, Ramsey released his next single, "Something You Can Hold". On June 20, 2024, Ramsey performed with Lana Del Rey at Fenway Park during her stadium tour debut. They performed a duet of "Blue Over You". On June 28, 2024, Ramsey released two singles: "All the Way to Memphis" and "How Do I Know If I'm in Love".

Ramsey released his debut album I'll See You in My Dreams as well as the music video of the song of the same name on September 20, 2024. Ramsey also went on to release his Christmas EP, Merry Christmas Baby, on November 15, 2024. February 7, 2025, Ramsey released a single featuring Harper Grace entitled "Live Lonely".

On January 6, 2026, Ramsey announced that he had been dropped by Big Loud/Atlantic as well as both his agency and management in 2025. Ramsey then went on to sign with Sandlot Records founded by JKash. On February 20, 2026 Ramsey released his single "That Somebody", followed by "Faith" on April 3, 2026. Ramsey then released his first single, "Hey There Trouble", for his sophomore album, Outlaw in Love, on July 24, 2026. The full album was released on August 14, 2026.

In September, following the release of his album, Ramsey served as a special guest and opening act for seven concerts headlined by Waylon Wyatt.

== Discography ==
=== Studio albums ===
Title	Details
I'll See You in My Dreams	Released: September 20, 2024; Label: Atlantic; Format: CD, LP, digital download, streaming
Outlaw in Love	Released: August 14, 2026; Label: Sandlot; Format: Digital download, streaming

=== Extended plays ===
Title	Details
Famous	Released: July 20, 2018; Label: Atlantic, Big Loud; Format: Digital download, streaming
Twang	Released: July 26, 2019; Label: Atlantic, Big Loud; Format: Digital download, streaming
Falls Into Place	Released: October 20, 2023; Label: Atlantic; Format: CD, digital download, streaming
Merry Christmas Baby	Released: November 15, 2024; Label: Atlantic; Format: Digital download, streaming

=== Singles ===
==== As lead artist ====
Title	Year	Peak chart positions					EP/Album
Title	Year	US	US Country	IRE	NZ	UK	EP/Album
"Famous"	2018	62	4	—	— (Note: "Famous" did not chart on the NZ Top 40 Singles Chart but it peaked at number four on the NZ Heatseeker Singles Chart.)	100	Famous
"Lovesick Blues"	2018	—	—	—	—	—	Famous
"The Way I See It"	2018	—	—	—	—	—	Famous
"Jambalaya (On the Bayou)"	2018	—	—	—	—	—	Famous
"White Christmas"	2018	—	—	—	—	—	Non-album single
"Twang"	2019	—	—	—	—	—	Twang
"Before I Knew It"	2022	—	—	100	8	—	Twang
"Reasons to Come Home"	2023	—	—	—	—	—	Falls Into Place
"She Got It Outta Me"	2023	—	—	—	—	—	Falls Into Place
"Next Right Thing"	2023	—	—	—	—	—	Falls Into Place
"Run Run Rudolph (Mason's Version)"	2023	—	—	—	—	—	Non-album singles
"Here All Day"	2024	—	—	—	—	—	Non-album singles
"Blue Over You"	2024	—	—	—	—	—	I'll See You in My Dreams
"Something You Can Hold"	2024	—	—	—	—	—	I'll See You in My Dreams
"All the Way to Memphis"	2024	—	—	—	—	—	I'll See You in My Dreams
"How Do I Know If I'm in Love"	2024	—	—	—	—	—	I'll See You in My Dreams
"Come Pick Me Up"	2024	—	—	—	—	—	I'll See You in My Dreams
"Shake Shake (All Night Long)"	2024	—	—	—	—	—	Twisters: The Album
"Live Lonely" (with Harper Grace)	2025	—	—	—	—	—	Non-album singles
"That Somebody"	2026	—	—	—	—	—	Non-album singles
"Faith"	2026	—	—	—	—	—	Non-album singles
"Hey There Trouble"	2026	—	—	—	—	—	Outlaw in Love
"—" denotes releases that did not chart or were not released in that territory.

==== As featured artist ====
Title	Year	Album
"Old Town Road (Remix)" (Lil Nas X featuring Billy Ray Cyrus, Young Thug and Mason Ramsey)	2019	Non-album single

=== Music videos ===
Video	Year
"Lovesick Blues"	2018
"White Christmas"	2018
"Twang"	2019
"How Could I Not"	2019
"Before I Knew It"	2022
"Reasons to Come Home"	2023
"Next Right Thing"	2023
"Blue Over You"	2024
"Something You Can Hold"	2024
"Come Pick Me Up"	2024
"I'll See You in My Dreams"	2024
"Silent Night"	2024
"Live Lonely" (with Harper Grace)	2025
"Hey There Trouble"	2026

== Filmography & Commercials ==
Year	Title	Role	Ref.
2018	Mason Ramsey: Coming Home	Himself	
2019	The Angry Birds Movie 2	Oliver (voice)	
2020	Cows Menu (Burger King)	Himself	
2023	The Venmo Teen Account (with Mason Ramsey)	Himself	
2026	Jameis Winston Free Burger Day (Carl's Jr.)	Himself	
2026	Bronco Bagels	Himself	

== Tours ==
- How's Ur Girl & How's Ur Family Tour (2019)
- Falls Into Place Tour (2024)
- Monster Energy Outbreak Tour Presents: Mason Ramsey (2025)
