= Lord Castlereagh (1803 ship) =

History

United Kingdom
- Name: Lord Castlereagh
- Namesake: Robert Stewart, Viscount Castlereagh
- Owner: 1803–1816:Bruce, Fawcett and Co.; Later:Hormusjee Dorobjee Lascari
- Builder: P. Tonks, Cochin
- Fate: Wrecked 1840

General characteristics
- Tons burthen: 750, or 785, or 798, or 80875/94 (bm)
- Armament: 16 guns

Lord Castlereagh (or simply Castlereagh) was launched in 1803 at Cochin and spent her entire career as a country ship based in Bombay. She made several voyages to China, during the first of which she was present at the battle of Pulo Aura. She also made a few voyages to England, including one for the British East India Company (EIC). She participated as a transport in the British Invasion of Isle de France. She was lost in 1840 at Bombay coming into harbour.

== Career ==
In July 1803 the EIC appointed John Hayes captain of HCS Bombay. On the receipt of news of the resumption of war with France, the EIC appointed Hayes commodore of a small squadron consisting of Bombay, Mornington (22 guns), Teignmouth (16), and the armed vessel Castlereagh (16), and charged him with protecting the trade routes in the Bay of Bengal and adjacent waters.

At some point, Hayes and Bombay sailed to Muckie, Sumatra, and captured the fort there. It had belonged to the EIC, but had been lost due to the "treachery of the Malays". After three days of bombardment by Bombay and Castlereagh, Hayes landed at the head of a party of seamen and took the fort and adjacent batteries, which the British dismantled. They also took off 67 guns and a quantity of stores.

Castlereagh's first major commercial voyage was to China. In January 1804 she was at Canton and she sailed with the homeward bound China Fleet, which by the time it reached the approaches to the Strait of Malacca had swelled to include 16 East Indiamen, 11 country ships, a Portuguese merchant ship from Macau and a vessel from Botany Bay in New South Wales. On 14 February 1804, with the island of Pulo Aura within sight to the south-west near the eastern entrance to the Straits of Malacca, the China Fleet encountered a powerful French squadron under the command of Contre-Admiral Charles-Alexandre Durand Linois. The Fleet bluffed the French into withdrawing after only a brief exchange of shot.

Lord Castlereagh was present at the engagement but was not among the few vessels that actually exchanged fire with the French. This voyage was only the first of numerous voyages that Lord Castlereagh made to Canton, taking cotton and opium.

In 1804–05, Lord Castlereagh, McFarlane, master, broke the speed record for China voyages. She left Bombay on 15 September 1804, sailed through the Straits of Malacca to Manila, and arrived at Whampoa anchorage on 4 November. She left after four days and arrived at the Sand Heads on 13 February 1805, having made the round voyage in under four months.

Captain E. Cooper sailed from Bombay on 30 July 1809. Lord Castlereagh reached Saint Helena on 8 October and arrived at The Downs on 7 December. Lord Castlereagh was admitted to the Registry of Great Britain on 22 March 1810.

In late 1810 Lord Castlereagh was one of the transport vessels that supported the British invasion of Île de France.

After the surrender of Île de France Lord Castlereagh was one of nine ships the British government chartered as cartels to carry back to France the French troops captured in these campaigns.

On 7 November 1815 Lord Castlereagh sailed from Bombay. She was at the Cape of Good Hope on 12 January 1816, and arrived at The Downs on 13 March. On her way she was not permitted to touch at Saint Helena. After their arrival, the passengers subscribed to a piece of plate that they presented to Captain M.B. Laing as a token of their appreciation of his conduct towards them on the voyage from Bombay to England. Lord Castlereagh returned to Bombay on 7 August. She had left the Portsmouth on 14 May and had she not encountered light winds after reaching Anjouan would have made the voyage in 80 days.

In 1822 Lord Castlereagh, F. Briggs, master, had to return to Bombay to refit. On 27 April she was off Algoa Bay when a gale developed that lasted until 5 May. She had to throw 290 bags of pepper overboard on 30 April to keep the pepper from chocking the pumps. She arrived back in Bombay on 8 June. she was to go into dock on 2 July.

In June 1836, Lord Castlereagh sailed from Bombay for China. She arrived safely in Macao having struggled through the monsoon in the Bay of Bengal and a typhoon in the China Sea.

== Fate ==
Castlereagh was wrecked on 17 June 1840 with heavy loss of life while coming into Bombay during a gale.

As Lord William Bentinck was attempting to enter port during a gale she wrecked on some reefs. Lord Castlereagh mistook Lord William Bentinck's lights for those of a ship safely at anchor, and steered on to the same reef, also wrecking.

One hundred lives were lost on Lord William Bentinck. Castlereagh had on board 200 people, 70 of whom were saved.
