= West Indiaman =

Merchant ship sailing between Great Britain or Europe and the Caribbean

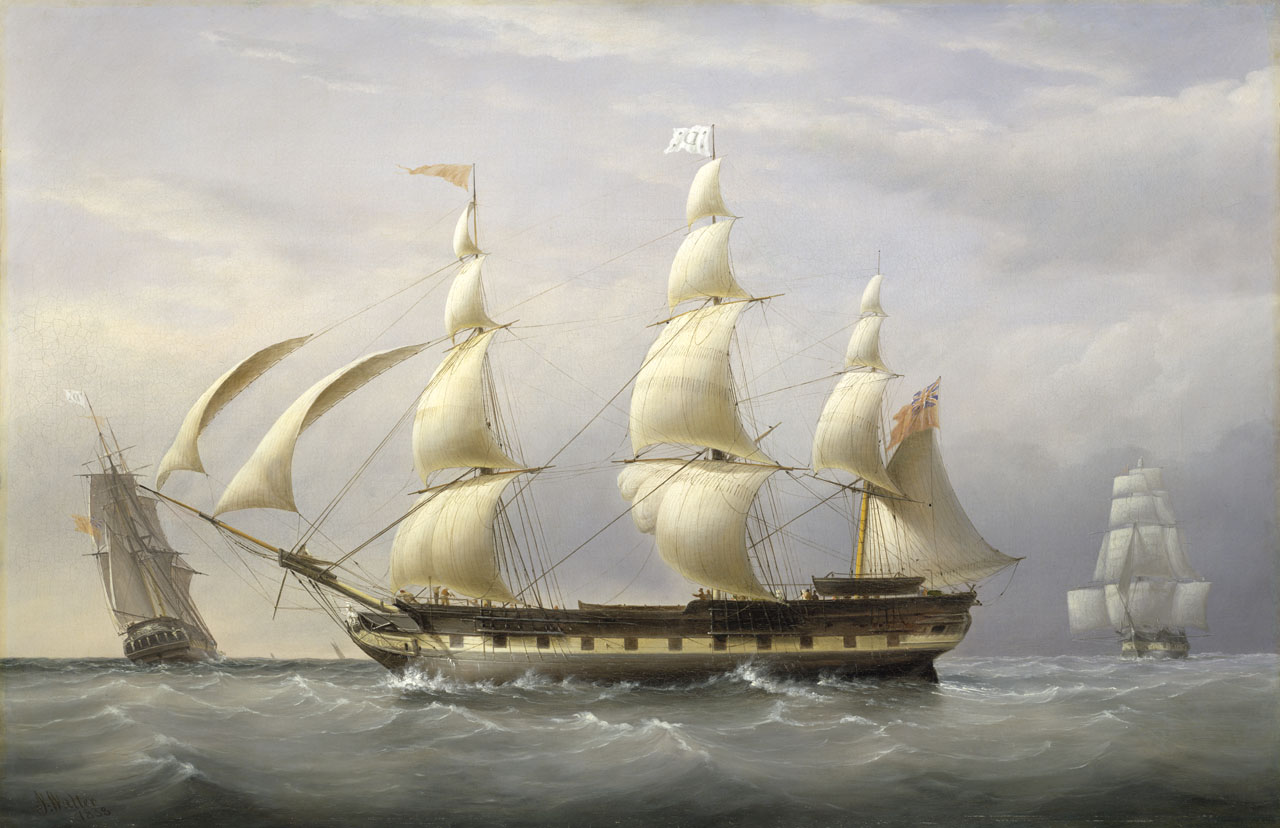
1838 painting of a British West Indiaman

West Indiaman was a general name for any merchantman sailing ship making runs from the Old World to the West Indies and the east coast of the Americas. These ships were generally strong ocean-going ships capable of handling storms in the Atlantic Ocean. The term was used to refer to vessels belonging to the Danish (e.g. Æolus), Dutch, English, and French (e.g. Indispensable) West India companies.

Similarly, at the time (18th and 19th centuries) people also referred to East Indiamen (ships trading with the East Indies), Guineamen (slave ships), or Greenlandmen (whalers in the North Seas whale fishery).

British West Indiamen tended to be London-built and to sail directly from England (generally London) to the West Indies. Guineamen tended to be built (or owned) in Bristol and Liverpool and to sail from Bristol or Liverpool via West Africa in what is now often referred to as the triangular trade in enslaved people. There were London-based Guineamen, (for example Experiment), and Liverpool-based West Indiamen, (for example Irlam and Irlam).

There were design differences between vessels built for the different trades, but the vessels were not highly specialized. A vessel built as a West Indiaman typically had less height between decks than comparably sized East Indiaman. For instance, William Miles had a height of 5 ft 11 in (1.8 m) in her upper deck and a mere 4 ft 10 in (1.5 m) under her lower deck. Lord William Bentinck, a comparably sized East Indiaman, had a height of 6 ft 9 in (2.1 m) below her deck. The cargoes the two types of vessels were designed to carry dictated the difference. West Indiamen brought semi-liquid sugar back to England in casks laid on their sides that were only laid in one course. East Indiamen carried mostly light goods in bales or cases that could be and were necessarily laid to a greater height.

Often the same vessel would move between roles and routes over the course of her career as entrepreneurial owners chased profitability. Thus Fame started and finished as a West Indiaman, but in between made a voyage for the British East India Company (EIC) as an East Indiaman, and two voyages as a Guineaman. Holderness made one voyage as an East Indiaman for the EIC, then several as a Greenlandman, and ended up a West Indiaman.

== See also ==
- Chinaman (ship), a ship used to transport colonial goods from China
- Guineaman, a ship used to transport slaves from the region of Guinea
- East Indiaman, a ship used to transport colonial goods from the East Indies and the Indian subcontinent
- Lascar

== Bibliography ==
- Farr, Grahame E., ed. (1971). Bristol Shipbuilding in the Nineteenth Century. Bristol Branch of the Historical Association The University Bristol.
- Tibbles, Anthony (2005). Transatlantic Slavery: Against Human Dignity. Liverpool University Press. ISBN 978-0-853-23198-1.
