= Lord William Bentinck (1828 Bristol ship) =

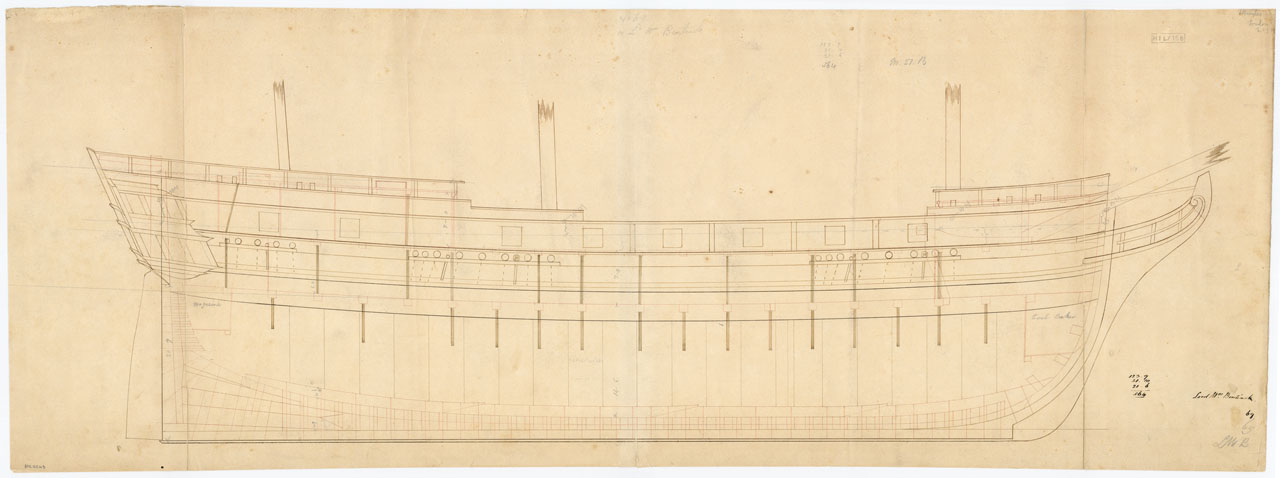
- Drawing showing the inboard profile for the Lord William Bentinck, c. 1828

History

United Kingdom
- Name: Lord William Bentinck
- Namesake: Lord William Bentinck
- Owner: 1828:George Hillhouse; 1829:Hutchinson, London.; 1836:Mangles & Co., London.
- Builder: Hillhouse & Sons
- Launched: 26 April 1828
- Fate: Wrecked 1840

General characteristics
- Tons burthen: 564, or 56416/94 (bm)
- Length: 123 ft 9 in (37.7 m)
- Beam: 31 ft 10 in (9.7 m)
- Depth of hold: 6 ft 9 in (2.1 m)
- Propulsion: Sail
- Notes: Two decks & three masts

Lord William Bentink was launched in 1828 at Bristol. She made one voyage for the British East India Company (EIC), and one transporting convicts to Tasmania. She was wrecked on 18 June 1840 off the harbour of Bombay.

== Career ==
Initially Thomas Craigie was master of Lord William Bentinck, but already on 12 May Captain John Craigie assumed command.

Captain John Cragie sailed Lord William Bentinck from the Downs on 8 June 1828, bound for China and Halifax. She arrived at Whampoa on 18 November. Homeward bound, she crossed the Second Bar on 21 January 1829, reached St Helena on 30 March, and arrived at Halifax on 9 May. Lord William Bentinck discharged her cargo of tea but then ran ashore. HMS Tyne and HMS Hussar helped re-float her on 14 May; she docked at Connard's Wharf, Halifax, on the same day.

On 2 Feb. 1830, her owners sold Lord William Bentinck to Henry Hutchinson, master mariner. He assumed command on 16 February, and proceeded to re-register her at London. Her trade was listed as London—China.

According to one source, on 5 June 1831 she sailed for Madras and Bengal, returning the next year.

In 1836 Mangles & Co. purchased her from Hutchinson.

Captain William S. Stockley sailed Lord William Bentinck from Portsmouth on 14 April 1838. She arrived at Hobart, Van Diemen's Land, on 26 August. She had embarked 320 male convicts, three of whom died on the way.

== Fate ==
Lord William Bentinck wrecked in 1840. As she was approaching Bombay on 17 June, she overshot the port in a gale. She attempted to turn south but wrecked on a reef. She hoisted distress signals but quickly came apart. She had on board passengers, European recruits for the Indian army, and a valuable cargo. Twenty-eight crew, seven passengers and 65 soldiers were lost. A later accounting gave her master's name as Ord, and reported that she had 150 recruits, 11 passengers, and 39 crew.

Worse yet, Lord Castlereagh mistook Lord William Bentinck's lights for those of a ship safely at anchor, and steered on to the same reef, also wrecking. Castlereagh had on board 200 people, 70 of whom were saved.
