= Thelma & James =

Country music duo

- Origin: Nashville, Tennessee
- Genres: Country; Americana
- Years active: 2024-present
- Label: Big Loud
- Members: Jake Etheridge; MacKenzie Porter
- Website: Official website

Thelma & James are a country music duo composed of married couple MacKenzie Porter and Jake Etheridge. The duo is signed to Big Loud Records. They released their debut extended play Starting Over in 2025.

== Origin ==
MacKenzie Porter and Jake Etheridge met in 2012 at a songwriting session, and Porter later asked Etheridge to sing backup vocals on her single "If You Ask Me To". The two began dating in 2014, and were married in 2019, but they scarcely collaborated with each other in their musical or acting careers for years. In 2019, they appeared together in the music video for Jake Owen's "I Was Jack (You Were Diane)" and in the video for Porter's own single "About You".

In December 2024, Porter was facing uncertainty as her longtime team at Big Loud closed their artist management team, so she asked Etheridge to write a song with her one night. The couple had not written a song together in ten years, but wrote "Happy Ever After You" together that night. Porter shared a clip of the song on TikTok, and the pair decided to release it after receiving a wave of positive comments and feedback from fans and other artists. After deciding to form a proper duo together, they chose the name "Thelma & James" as Thelma is Porter's middle name and her grandmother's first name, while James is Etheridge's legal first name, and was his grandfather's first name.

== Career ==
The duo's first official release as Thelma & James was "Happy Ever After You" in January 2025. The song would go on to chart in Canada and Australia. In March 2025, the duo released the song "First Love" and officially signed a record deal with Big Loud. Both songs were included on their debut extended play Starting Over, which was released on September 19, 2025.

In 2026, Thelma & James released several new singles, "If You Ain't In Love By Now", "Alternate Ending", "Home In Your Broken Heart", and "The Way That It Wasn't". In the summer of 2026, the duo supported Luke Combs's "My Kinda Saturday Night Tour on select dates. The duo was nominated in five categories at the 2026 Canadian Country Music Association Awards, and won Video of the Year for "Parking Lot Prayers" and Alternative Country Album of the Year for Starting Over. Thelma & James are nominated for Vocal Duo of the Year at the 60th Annual Country Music Association Awards.

== Members ==
=== MacKenzie Porter ===
MacKenzie Lea Porter, born January 29, 1990, is a Canadian singer, songwriter, and actress from Medicine Hat, Alberta. She has played both the guitar and violin from a young age. Porter initially moved to Vancouver, British Columbia, as a teenager to pursue a career in acting, before later moving to Nashville, Tennessee, to pursue a solo career in country music.

Porter has had a notable solo career prior to forming Thelma & James, releasing two albums, landing five number one hits at Canadian country radio, including "These Days", and featuring on Dustin Lynch's US number one hit "Thinking 'Bout You". As an actress, Porter has appeared in numerous television shows and films, most notably as a starring role in Travelers as Marcy Warton.

Porter gave birth to her and Etheridge's first child, a daughter, in March 2024.

=== Jake Etheridge ===
James "Jake" Etheridge, born April 28, 1988, is an American singer, songwriter, and actor from Lexington, South Carolina. Etheridge was a member of the Netherlands-based country band The Common Linnets, and co-wrote their international hit song "Calm After the Storm". In his acting career, Etheridge is best known for playing the role of Sean McPherson on the TV series Nashville.

== Discography ==
=== Singles ===
Year	Title	Peak chart positions			Album
Year	Title	CAN	CAN Country	AUS Country	Album
2025	"Happy Ever After You"	92	11	17	Starting Over
2026	"Alternate Ending"	—	19	50	TBA
2026	"Home in Your Broken Heart"	—	—	45	TBA

=== Music videos ===
Title	Year	Director
"Parking Lot Prayers"	2025	Caleb Donato
"White Christmas"	2025	Not listed
