= Guelph Collegiate Vocational Institute =

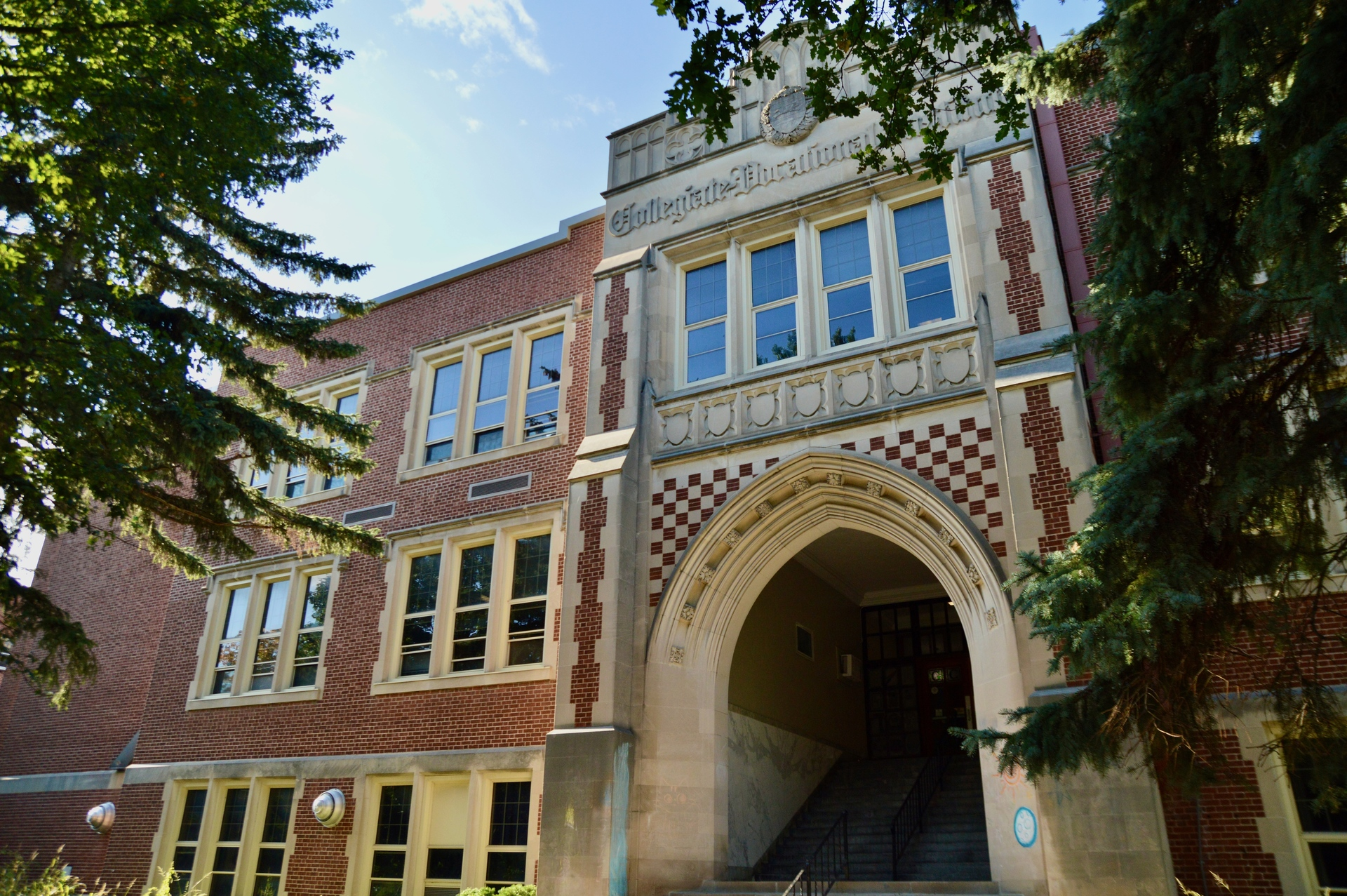
- Front exterior view of Guelph Collegiate Vocational Institute, photographed on September 25, 2025.

Location
- 155 Paisley Street; Guelph, Ontario, N1H 2P3; Canada; 43°32′34″N 80°15′33″W

Information
- School type: Public
- Motto: Hic Patet Ingeniis Campus ("Here lies open the field for the quest of knowledge.")
- Religious affiliation: None
- Founded: 1854
- School board: Upper Grand District School Board (UGDSB)
- Principal: Audra Cook
- Grades: 9-12+
- Enrollment: 1689 (2026-2027)
- Language: English
- Schedule: 8:55 AM - 3:15 PM
- Colours: Green and white
- Mascot: The Gael
- Team name: Gaels
- Website: www.ugdsb.ca/o/gcvi/

The Guelph Collegiate Vocational Institute (GCVI, Guelph C.V.I., GC) is a public high school located in Guelph, Ontario, Canada. Founded in 1854, it is the oldest continuously operating public high school in Guelph and the third oldest continuously operating public high schools in Ontario, Canada. The school is part of the Upper Grand District School Board and is known for its long history, and its International Baccalaureate (IB) program.

== Academic Programs ==
International Baccalaureate (IB) Program The Guelph Collegiate Vocational Institute is one of the few high schools in the Upper Grand District School Board to offer the International Baccalaureate (IB) Diploma Programme. The IB program is an enriched academic program designed for motivated students who want a more challenging and globally focused education.

Specialist High Skills Major (SHSM) GCVI offers the Specialist High Skills Major (SHSM) program for students in Grades 11 and 12. It is a Ministry of Education–approved program that lets students specialize in a specific career sector while still earning their Ontario Secondary School Diploma (OSSD).

Cooperative Education (Co-op) GCVI offers co-op placements where students earn credits through real-world work experience. These placements can be connected to SHSM sectors or taken independently to explore career interests.

== History ==
The high school which eventually became known as the Guelph Collegiate and Vocational Institute (GCVI) was founded in the early-mid-19th century by John Galt, also the founder of Guelph, Ontario (1827). The school was originally housed in a large four window log building known as "the Priory"; itself one of the first buildings constructed in Guelph. In 1854 the school moved to its current site on Paisley Road due to the construction of the Grand Trunk Railway.

The original building on the new site was torn down after a few decades and a new school constructed. Eventually a wooden gymnasium was added in 1886, and the school remained the same until 1906, when a large new wing was added to the left of the bell tower.

Guelph Collegiate Vocational Institute had Canada's first high school lunch cafeteria.

By this time the school was developing a reputation second to none in the province. Finally, by the nineteen twenties there were serious problems with overcrowding. In 1923 a new building opened (constructed at a cost of $400,000) that included modern plumbing, a massive skylight covering the large, two story, open auditorium area. It was called the most modern and upscale school building in Ontario.

The older buildings were connected to the school and used periodically before they were torn down in 1962 to facilitate several more additions including a modern gym, business and science wing, and tech wings.

Accomplished alumni include: Col. John McCrae (Author of "In Flanders Fields."), Hugh C. Guthrie (Canadian federal opposition leader, leader of the Conservative Party), Ed Joliffe (one of three GCVI Rhodes Scholars and founder of the Ontario CCF, and opposition leader in the Ontario House), George Alexander Drew (Mayor of Guelph, Premier of Ontario, Leader of the Opposition in the House of Commons, Leader of the Conservative Party, Ambassador to the UK, founding chairman of the Ontario Securities Commission, World War I hero), and Donna Strickland (Nobel Physics laureate).

A bronze plaque memorial to Col John McCrae was erected by the Guelph Collegiate Vocational Institute.

GCVI is also known for its extracurricular chamber choir, directed by music teacher Lane Osborne. The ensemble regularly participates in regional choral competitions, including Kiwanis, and has performed with several notable musical artists such as Alice Cooper, Melissa Etheridge, Wilco, Tom Morello, Of Monsters and Men, Modest Mouse, Everclear, and Foreigner. The GCVI Chamber Choir has appeared twice at Carnegie Hall in New York City, first in 2023 performing Ola Gjeilo’s Dreamweaver, and again in 2024 presenting Eric Whitacre’s Goodnight Moon and The Gift of the Magi. In June 2026, the choir performed Gjeilo’s Sunrise Mass during a workshop in Oslo, Norway, led by the composer and conducted by Irene Messoloras .

== Layout ==
The Guelph Collegiate Vocational Institute consists of four main buildings.

Building A (the Old Building) consists of three levels. The bottom level holds the visual arts department, computer technology department, chemistry department and a general sciences department. The floor above holds the guidance department, main office, geography department, math department, hairstyling and aesthetics department, and an auditorium that extends up into the top floor. The top floor holds the English department, family studies department and the biology department.

Building B (the New Building) has three levels as well. The business and economics departments, as well as the physics department and the nurse's office, are located on the lowest floor. A computer education department is located on the second level. The history and current languages departments are on the upper floor.

Building C is divided into two floors. Three distinct gymnasiums are located on the first floor. The cafeteria of the school is above the gymnasium on the second floor.

Building D consists two floors as well, housing the school's technology and music departments. There are nine separate shops in the technological sector. They include: integrated technology, transportation technology, manufacturing technology, construction technology, communication technology, technological design, computer engineering technology and computer information science.

== Architecture ==
The Old Building of the Guelph Collegiate Vocational Institute consists of building styles that are unique only to that school in the City of Guelph. The original oak doors are still present from the building's original construction in 1923. Marble and granite encase all of the hallway floors throughout The Old Building. The hallways on the main floor of The Old Building measure an outstanding 18 ft. in height. The main entrance way into the school is surrounded by a large archway. It is easy to see the vast number of students who have walked the halls of G.C.V.I. as there are large indents that have been left in the granite stairways of the school from many thousands of feet walking up and down them each day.

== Notable alumni ==
In the Ontario provincial elections of 1943, 1945 and 1948, both the premier George Alexander Drew and Opposition Leader Edward Bigelow (Ted) Jolliffe were former GCVI Students, so regardless of who won the election the Premier of Ontario would have been a GCVI alumnus.

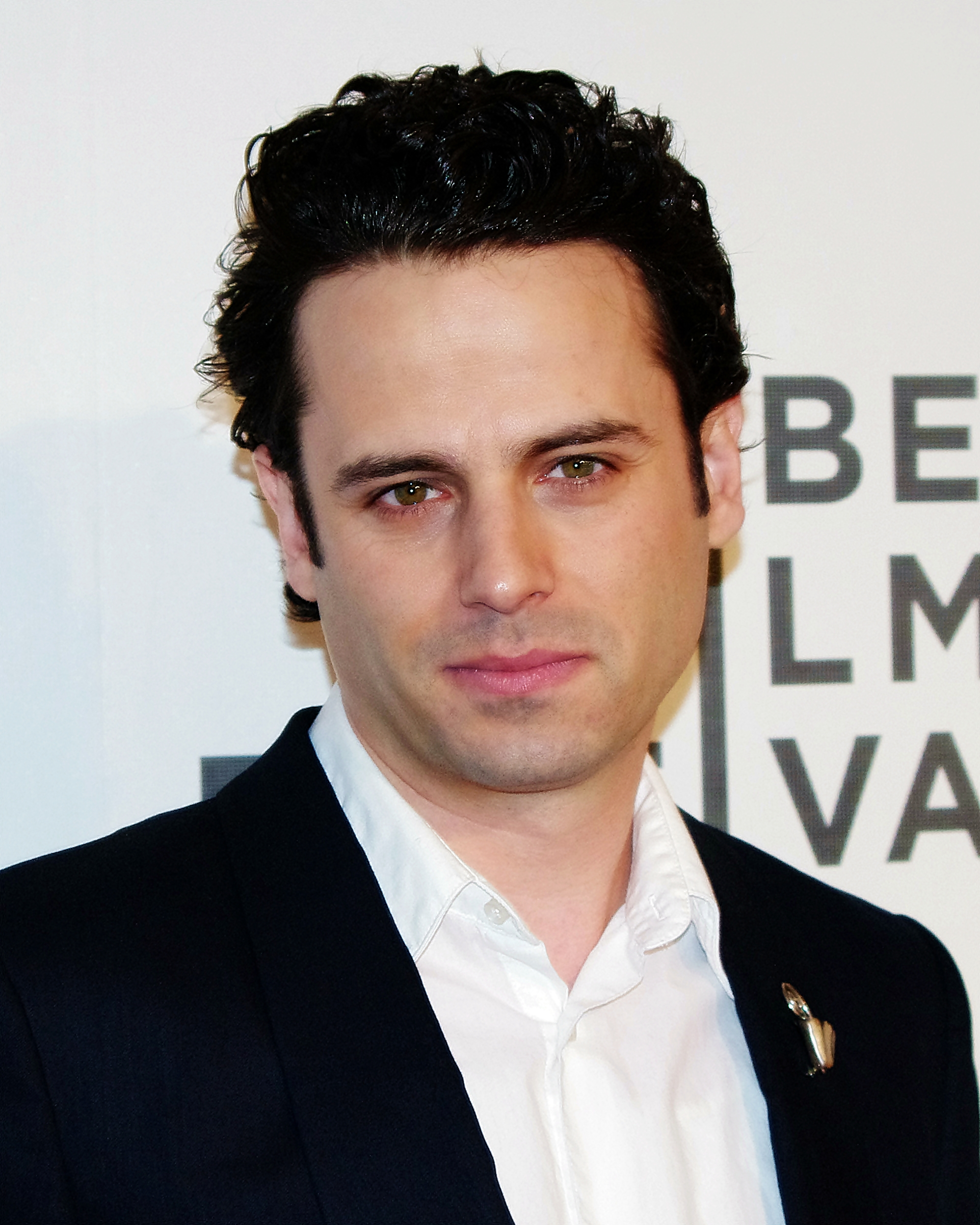
Luke Kirby

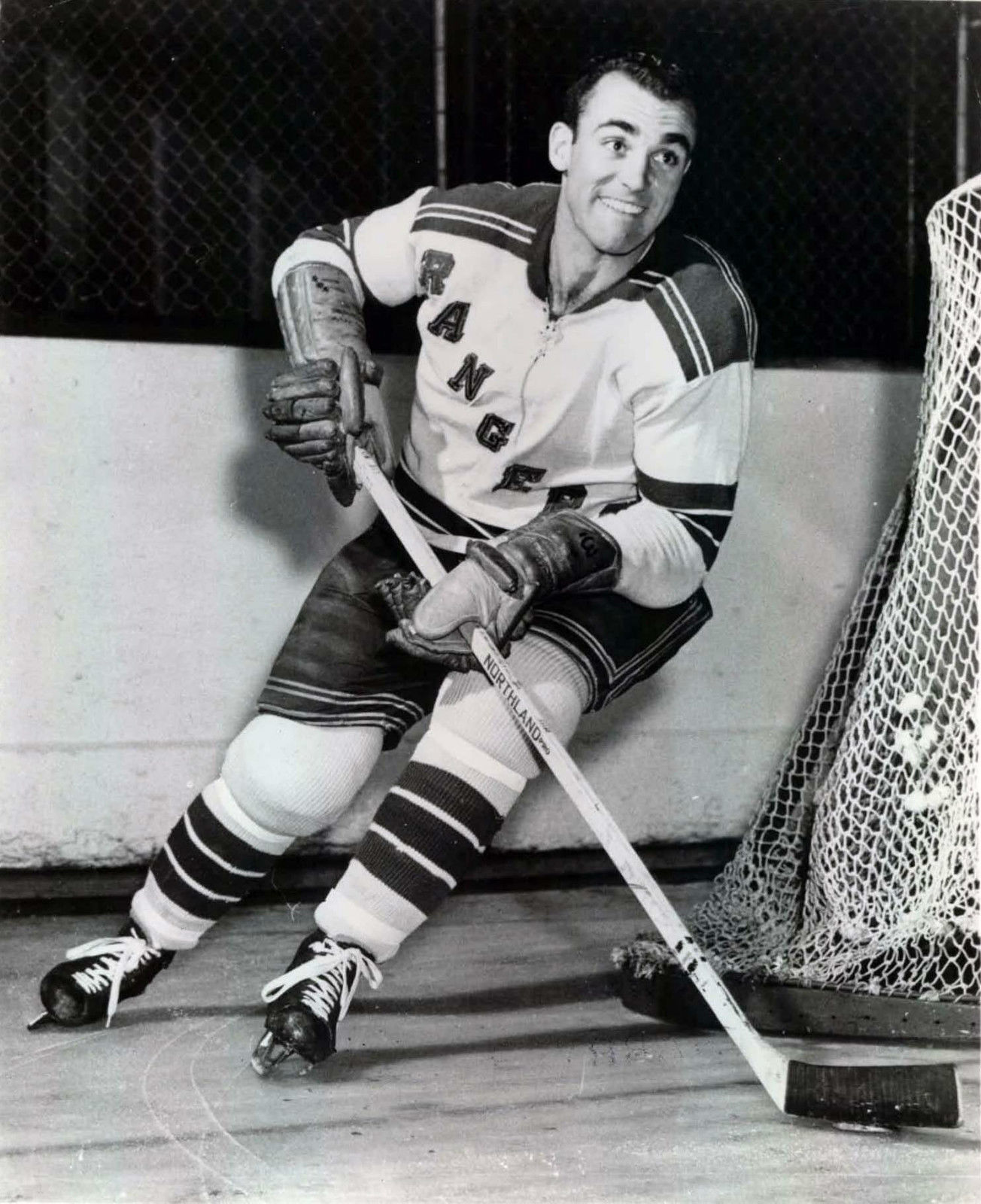
Harry Howell

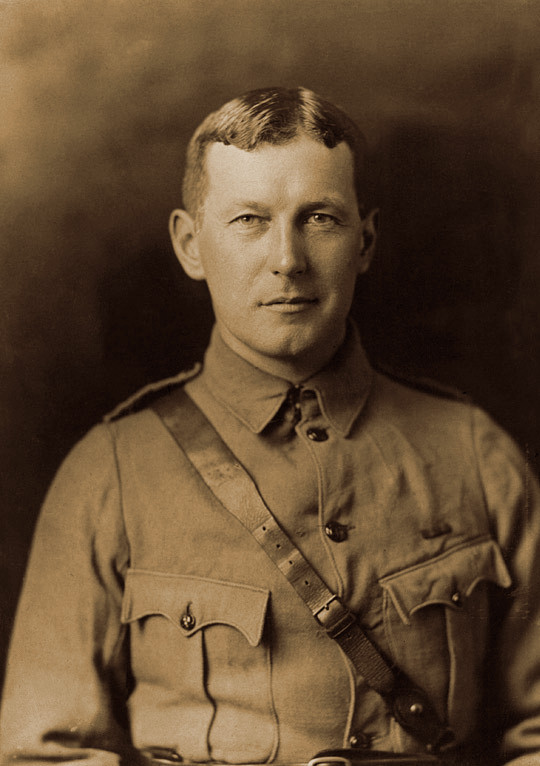
John McCrae

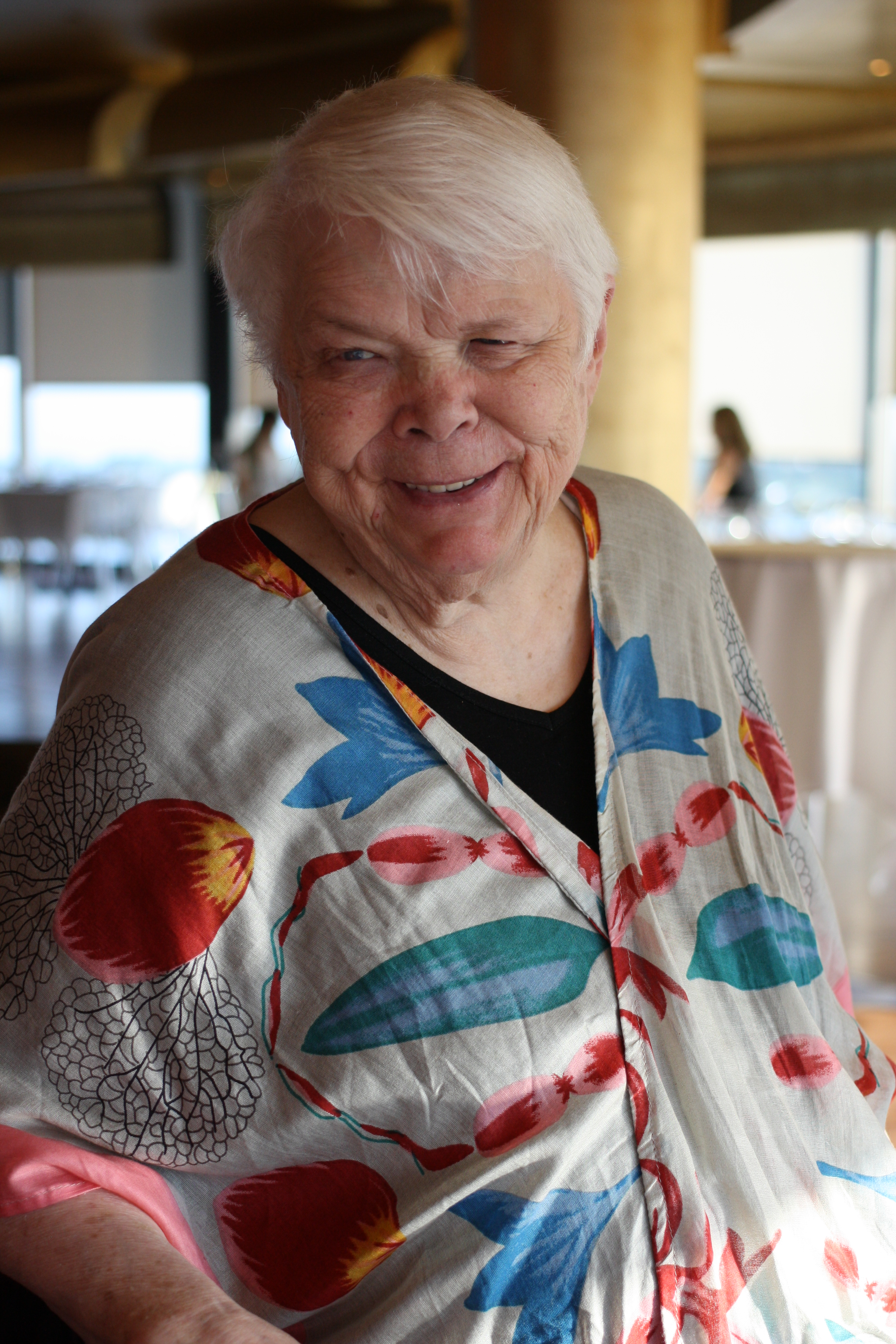
Jean Little

=== Actors ===
- Carla Collins (1965 – ), actress known for her role of Rusty Sinclair in Paradise Falls
- Luke Kirby (1978 – ), Primetime Emmy Award winner in the role of Lenny Bruce in the television series The Marvelous Mrs. Maisel

=== Artists ===
- Kelly Richardson (1972 – ), artist working with digital technologies to create hyper-real landscapes

=== Athletes ===
- Harry Howell (1932 – 2019), professional ice hockey player from 1952 – 1976 and inducted into the Hockey Hall of Fame in 1979
- Adam Spencer (1972 – ), curler who has represented Ontario at The Brier
- Jon Oosterhuis (1977 - ), professional Canadian Football League player for the Winnipeg Blue Bombers from 2002 - 2011
- Jake Reinhart (1989 – ), professional Canadian football player from 2014 – 2022
- Marissa Kurtimah (1994 – ), track and field athlete named to the Canadian Olympic team in 2016.
- Tavius Robinson (1999 – ), professional American football player with the Baltimore Ravens of the National Football League

=== Business people ===
- Arthur William Cutten (1870 – 1936), commodity speculator on Wall Street
- James Jerome Hill (1838 – 1916), chief executive officer of a family of lines headed by the Great Northern Railway

=== Military ===
- Charley Fox (1920 – 2008), Flight Lieutenant in the Royal Canadian Air Force in World War II
- John Kenneth Macalister (1914 – 1944), volunteered for the Special Operations Executive in World War II and was executed at Buchenwald concentration camp
- John McCrae (1872 – 1918), World War I physician and author of the poem In Flanders Fields

=== Musicians ===
- Mike DeAngelis (???? – ), guitarist for the Arkells
- Edward Johnson (1878 – 1959), general manager of the Metropolitan Opera in New York City from 1935 – 1950
- Andrew Paul MacDonald (???? – ), classical composer, guitarist, conductor and music educator
- Virginia to Vegas (???? – ), singer and songwriter known for the songs We Are Stars and Lights Out

=== Politicians ===
- George Alexander Drew (1894 – 1973), 14th premier of Ontario from 1943 – 1948
- Hugh Guthrie (1866 – 1939), member of the House of Commons of Canada from 1900 – 1935
- Alfred Hales (1909 – 1998), member of the House of Commons of Canada from 1957 – 1968
- William Ernest Hamilton (1902 – 1985), member of the Legislative Assembly of Ontario from 1945 – 1955
- Henry Alfred Hosking (1908 – 1957), member of the House of Commons of Canada from 1948 – 1957
- Ted Jolliffe (1909 – 1998), leader of the Ontario CCF from 1942 – 1953
- Liz Sandals (1947 – ), member of the Legislative Assembly of Ontario from 2003 – 2018

=== Scientists ===
- Donna Strickland (1959 – ), awarded the Nobel Prize in Physics in 2018 for the practical implementation of chirped pulse amplification

=== Writers ===
- Judy Fong Bates (1949 – ), Alex Award winning author of Midnight at the Dragon Café
- Beth Goobie (1959 – ), poet and fiction writer known for her poem Civilization lives in the throat
- Jean Little (1932 – 2020), children's author of Mine for Keeps and From Anna
- Joey Slinger (1943 – ), humour columnist for the Toronto Star

== See also ==
- Education in Ontario
- List of secondary schools in Ontario
