= Drinkin' Songs =

2020 song by MacKenzie Porter

Single by MacKenzie Porter

from the EP Drinkin' Songs: The Collection
- Released: September 25, 2020
- Genre: Country pop
- Length: 3:28
- Label: Big Loud
- Songwriter(s): Griffen Palmer; Lucas Nord
- Producer(s): Joey Moi; Jacob Durett

MacKenzie Porter singles chronology
"Seeing Other People" (2020)	"Drinkin' Songs" (2020)	"Thinking 'Bout You" (2021)

Music video
- "Drinkin' Songs" on YouTube

"Drinkin' Songs" is a song recorded by Canadian country artist MacKenzie Porter. The song was co-written by Griffen Palmer and Lucas Nord. It was the fourth single from Porter's extended play Drinkin' Songs: The Collection.

== Critical reception ==
Erica Zisman of NY Country Swag called the song a "heartbreak anthem" as well as "heart-achingly beautiful and relatable". The Country Note referred to the track as "upbeat" and "a celebration of getting over him".

== Music video ==
The official music video for "Drinkin' Songs" premiered on February 5, 2021. It was directed by Justin Clough and filmed in Nashville, Tennessee. The video features Porter chronologically moving through the decades, having a different, inconsiderate male beau each time.

== Commercial performance ==
"Drinkin' Songs" reached a peak of #5 on the Billboard Canada Country chart dated March 13, 2021. It also peaked at #74 on the Canadian Hot 100 for the same week. The song has been certified Gold by Music Canada.

== Charts ==
Chart performance for "Drinkin' Songs"
Chart (2020–2021)	Peak position
Canada (Canadian Hot 100)	74
Canada Country (Billboard)	5

== Certifications ==
Certifications for "Drinkin' Songs"
Region	Certification	Certified units/sales
Canada (Music Canada)	Gold	40,000^{‡}
^{‡} Sales+streaming figures based on certification alone.
