= Drinkin' Songs: The Collection =

EP by MacKenzie Porter
- Released: November 6, 2020
- Genre: Country pop
- Length: 22:10
- Label: Big Loud
- Producers: Joey Moi (all tracks); Dave Cohen (tracks 1, 3, 5, 7); Jacob Durrett (track 2); Cameron Montgomery (track 3); Ilya Toshinsky (track 5); Hauf (track 7)

MacKenzie Porter chronology
MacKenzie Porter (2014)	Drinkin' Songs: The Collection (2020)	Nobody's Born with a Broken Heart (2024)

Singles from Drinkin' Songs: The Collection
- 1. "About You" Released: November 30, 2018; 2. "These Days" Released: March 22, 2019; 3. "Seeing Other People" Released: February 7, 2020; 4. "Drinkin' Songs" Released: September 25, 2020

Drinkin' Songs: The Collection is an extended play by Canadian country artist MacKenzie Porter. It was released on November 6, 2020, through Big Loud Records. It was Porter's debut American release, and includes the singles "About You", "These Days", "Seeing Other People", and "Drinkin' Songs".

== Track listing ==
Drinkin' Songs: The Collection track listing
No.	Title	Writer(s)	Length
1.	"These Days"	MacKenzie Porter; Jordan Sapp; Parker Welling	2:53
2.	"Drinkin' Songs"	Griffen Palmer; Lucas Nord	3:28
3.	"About You"	Cameron Montgomery; Corey Crowder; Michael Hardy; Sarah Buxton	2:57
4.	"The One"	Porter; Claire Douglas; Madison Kozak; Tom Douglas	3:54
5.	"Drive Thru"	Porter; Tommy English; Natalie Hemby	2:39
6.	"Seeing Other People"	Matt McGinn; Emily Falvey; Jason Afable	3:02
7.	"These Days" (Remix)	Porter; Sapp; Welling	3:17
Total length:			22:10

== Charts ==
=== Singles ===
Year	Single	Peak chart positions								Certifications
Year	Single	AUS Country	CAN	CAN AC	CAN CHR	CAN Country	CAN Hot AC	US Country Songs	US Country Airplay	Certifications
2018	"About You"	—	—	—	—	1	—	—	—	MC: Gold
2019	"These Days"	1	44	9	11	1	10	45	56	MC: 2× Platinum
2020	"Seeing Other People"	—	92	—	—	1	—	—	—	MC: Gold
2020	"Drinkin' Songs"	—	74	—	—	5	—	—	—	MC: Gold
"—" denotes releases that did not chart or were not released in that territory

== Awards and nominations ==
Year	Association	Category	Nominated work	Result	Ref.
2020	Canadian Country Music Awards	Songwriter of the Year	"These Days" (shared with Jordan Sapp, Parker Welling)	Nominated	
2021	Juno Awards	Country Album of the Year	Drinkin' Songs: The Collection	Nominated	
