= This Sucks. =

2021 single by Virginia to Vegas and MacKenzie Porter

Single by Virginia to Vegas and MacKenzie Porter

from the EP Remember That Time We
- Released: September 17, 2021
- Recorded: 2020
- Genre: Pop
- Length: 3:14
- Label: Wax; Casablanca; Republic
- Songwriters: Derik John Baker; Elizabeth Lowell Boland; MacKenzie Porter; Nathan Ferraro; Mike Wise
- Producers: Mike Wise; Derik John Baker; MxntyICE

Virginia to Vegas singles chronology
| "Malibu" (2021) | "This Sucks." (2021) | "No Excuses" (2022) |

MacKenzie Porter singles chronology
| "Thinking 'Bout You" (2021) | "This Sucks." (2021) | "Pickup" (2022) |

Music video
- "This Sucks." on YouTube

"This Sucks." (stylized as "this sucks.") is a song co-written and recorded by Canadian pop artist Virginia to Vegas and Canadian country pop artist MacKenzie Porter. The two wrote the song with Lowell, Nathan Ferraro, and Mike Wise, while Wise co-produced the track with Virginia to Vegas and a Polish-Canadian YouTuber MxntyICE.

== Background ==
Derik John Baker, known professionally as "Virginia to Vegas", stated that "This Sucks." is "about what seeing an ex with someone else does to you. You're happy for them because you once loved them, but the only words you can find to explain how you're feeling are 'Wow, this really sucks right now.'". Baker remarked that he had heard a song from Porter on the radio while driving to the grocery store and believed it would be "perfect" to have her join him on the song.

== Critical reception ==
Kerry Doole of FYI Music News stated that "This Sucks." was written in Virginia to Vegas' "signature electro-pop style," adding that it "features his plaintive vocals effectively paired with Porter’s clear delivery". The Reviews Are In described the song as a "fantastic and unexpected collaboration on a song that hits your feelings but keeps the same pop-driven, foot-tapping, uptempo groove we’re used to from [Virginia to Vegas]". Michael O'Connor Marotta of Vanyaland said the track "tackles" the subject of seeing "an ex-lover while out and about" with "electro-pop vigour". Lefuturewave noted "an engaging tone," saying the "chorus’ electronic-influenced style will keep listeners spellbound". Enigma Online said the track was "driven with a quintessential pop beat but feels melancholy at its core," adding it is "the perfect soundtrack to one of the year’s least favorite transitions" as summer transitions to fall.-

== Charts ==
Chart performance for "This Sucks."
| Chart (2022) | Peak position |
|---|---|
| Canada CHR/Top 40 (Billboard) | 26 |
| Canada Hot AC (Billboard) | 42 |
| Poland (Polish Airplay Top 100) | 56 |
