= Tavius Robinson =

Canadian-born American football player (born 1999)

- Robinson in 2026

No. 95 – Baltimore Ravens
- Position: Outside linebacker
- Roster status: Injured reserve

Personal information
- Born: January 3, 1999 (age 27); Guelph, Ontario, Canada
- Listed height: 6 ft 6 in (1.98 m)
- Listed weight: 262 lb (119 kg)

Career information
- High school: Guelph Collegiate Vocational (ON)
- College: Ole Miss (2020–2022)
- University: Guelph (2018–2019)
- NFL draft: 2023: 4th round, 124th overall pick
- CFL draft: 2023: 8th round, 66th overall pick

Career history
- Baltimore Ravens (2023–present)

Career NFL statistics as of 2026
- Total tackles: 104
- Sacks: 12.5
- Forced fumble: 2
- Pass deflections: 4
- Stats at Pro Football Reference

Tavius Patrick Robinson (born January 3, 1999) is a Canadian professional football outside linebacker for the Baltimore Ravens of the National Football League (NFL). He played U Sports football at Guelph and college football at Ole Miss.

== Early life ==
Robinson was born on January 3, 1999, and grew up in Guelph, Ontario. He attended Guelph Collegiate Vocational Institute and played football, basketball and track.

== Collegiate career ==
=== University of Guelph ===
He then began attending the University of Guelph, playing for the Guelph Gryphons and following in the footsteps of his uncle, Junior Robinson, who played there and later for ten years in the Canadian Football League (CFL) for six teams.

In his first year at Guelph, Robinson posted 29 tackles and four sacks along with one forced fumble, being named to the Ontario University Athletics (OUA) all-rookie squad. In ten games the following season, he recorded 39 tackles and 8.5 sacks, being named second-team All-OUA.

=== Ole Miss ===
After the 2020 U Sports football season was cancelled due to the COVID-19 pandemic, Robinson sought a transfer to an American school. He put together a highlight video with the help of one of his coaches, posted it on social media and afterwards received several offers, eventually choosing to commit to Ole Miss over LSU, Nebraska and San Diego State, among others. Although he had the option to redshirt, Robinson decided to play in his first year at Ole Miss and appeared in ten games with five starts, totalling 18 tackles.

As a senior in 2021, Robinson appeared in 11 games and tallied 28 tackles, including 4.5 for a loss, with 3.5 sacks. Although he had originally planned to declare for the 2022 NFL draft, he eventually decided to return to Ole Miss for a final season in 2022, after being given an extra year of eligibility due to COVID-19. Robinson started all 13 games in 2022, recording 44 tackles (of which 17 were solo), seven sacks, five forced fumbles and two fumble recoveries.

== Professional career ==
Pre-draft measurables
Height	Weight	Arm length	Hand span	Wingspan	40-yard dash	10-yard split	20-yard split	20-yard shuttle	Three-cone drill	Vertical jump	Broad jump	Bench press
6 ft 6 1/8 in (1.98 m)	257 lb (117 kg)	33 3/4 in (0.86 m)	9 5/8 in (0.24 m)	6 ft 7 1/4 in (2.01 m)	4.66 s	1.63 s	2.68 s	4.62 s	7.40 s	33.5 in (0.85 m)	10 ft 0 in (3.05 m)	23 reps
All values from NFL Combine/Pro Day

Robinson was selected in the fourth round (124th overall) of the 2023 NFL draft by the Baltimore Ravens. He was also ranked the fourth-best Canadian prospect ahead of the 2023 CFL draft, and was chosen in the eighth and final round (66th overall) by the Saskatchewan Roughriders.

Robinson began the 2025 season as one of Baltimore's starting linebackers. After suffering a broken foot in Week 6 against the Los Angeles Rams, Robinson was placed on injured reserve on October 22, 2025. He was activated on December 14, ahead of the team's Week 15 matchup against the Cincinnati Bengals.

== NFL career statistics ==
Legend
**Bold**	Career high

=== Regular season ===
Year	Team	Games		Tackles					Interceptions						Fumbles				
Year	Team	GP	GS	Cmb	Solo	Ast	Sck	TFL	Int	Yds	Avg	Lng	TD	PD	FF	Fmb	FR	Yds	TD
2023	BAL	17	1	26	13	13	1.0	2	0	0	0.0	0	0	0	0	0	0	0	0
2024	BAL	17	7	**32**	13	**19**	3.5	**4**	0	0	0.0	0	0	**1**	0	0	0	0	0
2025	BAL	10	7	28	**15**	13	**4.5**	3	0	0	0.0	0	0	**1**	**1**	0	0	0	0
2026	BAL	1	1	4	1	2	1.0	0	0	0	0.0	0	0	0	0	0	0	0	0
Career		45	16	90	42	45	10.0	9	0	0	0.0	0	0	2	1	0	0	0	0

=== Postseason ===
Year	Team	Games		Tackles					Interceptions						Fumbles				
Year	Team	GP	GS	Cmb	Solo	Ast	Sck	TFL	Int	Yds	Avg	Lng	TD	PD	FF	Fmb	FR	Yds	TD
2023	BAL	2	0	1	0	**1**	0.0	0	0	0	0.0	0	0	0	0	0	0	0	0
2024	BAL	2	2	**4**	**3**	**1**	0.0	**2**	0	0	0.0	0	0	0	0	0	0	0	0
Career		4	2	5	3	2	0.0	2	0	0	0.0	0	0	0	0	0	0	0	0
