= Seeing Other People (song) =

2020 song by MacKenzie Porter

Single by MacKenzie Porter

from the EP Drinkin' Songs: The Collection
- Released: February 7, 2020
- Genre: Country pop
- Length: 3:02
- Label: Big Loud
- Songwriter(s): Matt McGinn; Emily Falvey; Jason Afable
- Producer(s): Joey Moi

MacKenzie Porter singles chronology
"These Days" (2019)	"Seeing Other People" (2020)	"Drinkin' Songs" (2020)

Music video
- "Seeing Other People" on YouTube

"Seeing Other People" is a song recorded by Canadian country artist MacKenzie Porter. The track was produced by Joey Moi, and co-written by Matt McGinn, Emily Falvey, and Jason Afable. The song became the third single off Porter's EP Drinkin' Songs: The Collection.

== Background ==
Porter stated: "Seeing Other People’ is about the hardest moment after a breakup, seeing that person out with someone who isn't you. Your whole stomach drops when you see your person looking happier with someone else. I know that feeling all too well and I know so many others have felt the same." She told People, "This song means a lot to me. We have all gone through that one breakup that makes us question everything".

== Commercial performance ==
"Seeing Other People" reached a peak of #1 on the Billboard Canada Country chart dated July 25, 2020, becoming Porter's third consecutive and overall number one. This made Porter the first woman to score three consecutive Number One hits on Canadian country radio since Shania Twain in 1998. It also peaked at #92 on the Canadian Hot 100.

== Music video ==
The official music video for "Seeing Other People" premiered on People.com on May 29, 2020, and was directed by Justin Clough. The video finds Porter upset after seeing an ex out with another woman. It was shot in New York City to which Porter explained: "We chose to shoot it in New York because we loved the idea of setting against the backdrop of a location where there are millions of people and the likelihood of running into an ex is slim — but somehow, it still happens. Of course you are going to see them out and around in a small town, but the chances in a big city are so small that it almost hurts worse; like it was meant to be rubbed in your face."

== Charts ==
Chart (2020)	Peak position
Canada (Canadian Hot 100)	92
Canada Country (Billboard)	1

== Certifications ==
Region	Certification	Certified units/sales
Canada (Music Canada)	Gold	40,000^{‡}
^{‡} Sales+streaming figures based on certification alone.
