= Nobody's Born with a Broken Heart =

2024 studio album by MacKenzie Porter

Studio album by MacKenzie Porter
- Released: April 26, 2024
- Studio: Blackbird (Nashville); Sound Emporium (Nashville, Tennessee); Ocean Way (Nashville); Starstruck (Nashville)
- Genre: Country
- Length: 58:45
- Label: Big Loud
- Producer: Joey Moi

MacKenzie Porter chronology
Drinkin' Songs: The Collection (2020)	Nobody's Born with a Broken Heart (2024)

Singles from Nobody's Born with a Broken Heart
- 1. "Pickup" Released: January 22, 2022; 2. "Chasing Tornadoes" Released: May 5, 2023; 3. "Bet You Break My Heart" Released: November 17, 2023; 4. "Easy to Miss" Released: January 26, 2024; 5. "Have Your Beer" Released: July 22, 2024

Nobody's Born with a Broken Heart is the second studio album by Canadian country music artist MacKenzie Porter. It was released on April 26, 2024, on Big Loud Records. Porter wrote nine of the nineteen tracks on the album, and longtime collaborator Joey Moi produced every track. The album includes the singles "Pickup", "Chasing Tornadoes", "Bet You Break My Heart", "Easy to Miss", and "Have Your Beer".

== Background and release ==
In January 2024, Porter announced the album concurrently with the release of four songs: "Easy to Miss", "Young at Heart", "Pay Me Back in Change", and "Nobody's Born with a Broken Heart". The album was Porter's first full-length album to be released in the United States, and marked her debut full-length album on Big Loud Records, six years after signing with the label. Some of the songs on the album were written as early as 2017, while others were written as recently as 2023.

== Content ==
Porter stated that the album's title, Nobody's Born with a Broken Heart, reflects the sentiment that, "we all have these experiences, whether it's actual heartbreak in a relationship, work heartbreak, family heartbreak or whatever your situation may be. You always feel a little broken from different situations that you had envisioned to go a different way in your head, and overall that builds who you are as a person". Despite being in a happy marriage, Porter elected to record several "heartbreak" songs, including "Pay Me Back in Change" and "Foreclosure", as there "are times even in a really happy, healthy relationship where it feels dark," and that they are "part of the story too". She also remarked that she was happy to have more songs containing the banjo, fiddle, and mandolin on this album.

== Critical reception ==
Madison Hahnen of Music Row stated that the album "features vulnerable lyrics and clever lyrical hooks," noting that it "bridges the gap between country and pop". Hannah Compton of Building Our Own Nashville favourably reviewed the album, opining that it "paints a picturesque journey of heartbreak in a series of songs that are painfully relatable but also lead you onto the road of self healing". Stephen Andrew of Popculture described the album as a "phenomenal offering of pop-country songs full of sincerity, maturity, and driving-with-the-windows-down melodies". Laura Cooney of Entertainment Focus called the album a "strong introduction" to Porter's sound, highlighting "her vocal skills and ability as both a songwriter and an interpreter". Chris Parton of Nashville Lifestyles stated that the album "captures all different kinds of heartbreak, from the typical romantic ups and downs of dating (or even married life) to the struggle of getting a career off the ground".

== Track listing ==
No.	Title	Writer(s)	Length
1.	"Easy to Miss"	Hillary Lindsey; Emily Warren; Will Weatherly	2:49
2.	"Young at Heart"	Tofer Brown; Lauren Hungate; Emily Weisband	3:07
3.	"Bet You Break My Heart"	Chris Tompkins; Mark Holman; Travis Wood	2:38
4.	"Pay Me Back in Change"	Emily Klein	3:40
5.	"Rough Ride for a Cowboy"	MacKenzie Porter; Hungate; Luke Niccoli; Lydia Vaughan	2:22
6.	"Coming Home to You"	Brown; Hungate; Weisband; Caroline Watkins	3:28
7.	"Strong Things"	Porter; John Byron; Jacob Durrett; Lauren LaRue	3:21
8.	"Confession"	Porter; Emma-Lee; Karen Kosowski	2:36
9.	"Wrong One Yet"	Blake Pendergrass; Josh Thompson; Lauren Watkins	3:00
10.	"Pickup"	Porter; Vaughan; Will Bundy	2:48
11.	"Nightingale"	Porter; Mark Trussell; Parker Welling	3:00
12.	"Have Your Beer"	Porter; Vaughan; Welling; Jason Massey	2:42
13.	"Sucker Punch"	Porter; Tommy English; Nick Long	3:20
14.	"Walk Away"	Porter; Chris DeStefano; Jon Nite	3:06
15.	"Foreclosure"	Jared Hampton; Harper O'Neill; Vinnie Paolizzi; Ash Ruder	3:49
16.	"Less Is More"	Nite; Devin Dawson; Zachary Kale	3:39
17.	"Along These Lines"	Pendergrass; Rocky Block	2:56
18.	"Chasing Tornadoes"	Emily Landis; Jamie Moore; Lainey Wilson	2:57
19.	"Nobody's Born with a Broken Heart"	Porter; Niccoli; Vaughan; Welling	3:19
Total length:			58:45

== Personnel ==
Musicians

- MacKenzie Porter – lead vocals
- Dave Cohen – accordion, Hammond B3 organ, keyboards, Wurlitzer
- Jacob Durrett – programming
- Dan Dugmore – pedal steel
- Larry Franklin – fiddle
- David Garcia – bass, electric guitar
- Zach Kale – programming
- Trey Keller – background vocals
- Rob McNelley – electric guitar
- Joey Moi – programming
- Jerry Roe – drums, percussion, shaker, tambourine
- Jimmie Lee Sloas – bass
- Bryan Sutton – acoustic guitar, banjo, mandolin, dulcimer
- Ilya Toshinskiy – acoustic guitar, banjo, mandolin
- Derek Wells – electric guitar
- Alex Wright – mandolin, Hammond B3 organ, keyboards, Mellotron

Technical

- Joey Moi – production, mixing
- Ted Jensen – mastering
- Josh Ditty – mixing, recording, editing, recording assistance
- Eivind Nordland – mixing, editing
- Olle Romo – mixing
- Ryan Yount – recording, editing, recording assistance
- Jeff Balding – recording
- Ally Gecewicz – editing, production management
- Scott Cooke – editing
- Mike Walter – recording assistance
- Sean Badum – recording assistance
- Grant Wilson – recording assistance
- Austin Brown – recording assistance
- Katelyn Prieboy – room assistance
- Jacob Durrett – vocal recording, co-production on "Easy to Miss"
- David Garcia – co-production on "Easy to Miss"

Visuals

- Andrew Cook – art direction, creative direction, graphic design
- Tori Johnson – art direction, creative direction
- MacKenzie Porter – creative direction
- Bree Fish – photography

== Charts ==
=== Singles ===
Year	Single	Peak chart positions				Certifications
Year	Single	AUS Country	CAN Country	CAN	UK Country	Certifications
2022	"Pickup"	2	1	65	—	MC: Platinum
2023	"Chasing Tornadoes"	29	3	—	—	MC: Gold
2023	"Bet You Break My Heart"	15	11	—	—	
2024	"Easy to Miss" (Note: "Easy to Miss" has only been released as a single in the United Kingdom.)	—	—	—	25	
2024	"Have Your Beer"	1	9	—	—	
"—" denotes releases that did not chart or were not released to that territory.

== Awards and nominations ==
Year	Association	Category	Nominated work	Result	Ref
2022	Canadian Country Music Association	Songwriter(s) of the Year	"Pickup"	Nominated	
2024	Canadian Country Music Association	Album of the Year	Nobody's Born with a Broken Heart	Nominated	
2024	Canadian Country Music Association	Single of the Year	"Chasing Tornadoes"	Nominated	
2024	Canadian Country Music Association	Video of the Year	"Chasing Tornadoes"	Won	
2025	Juno Awards	Country Album of the Year	Nobody's Born with a Broken Heart	Nominated	

== Release history ==
Release formats for Nobody's Born with a Broken Heart
Country	Date	Format	Label	Ref.
Various	Digital download	April 26, 2024	Big Loud	
Various	Streaming	April 26, 2024	Big Loud	
United States	CD	April 26, 2024	Big Loud	
United States	Vinyl	April 26, 2024	Big Loud	
