= Judy Fong Bates =

Chinese–Canadian author

- Born: Fong Mun Sin; December 22, 1949 (age 76); Kaiping, Guangdong, China
- Citizenship: Canadian
- Education: University of Guelph; University of Toronto
- Occupations: Teacher, novelist, professor, non-fiction writer
- Website: www.judyfongbates.com

Judy Fong Bates (born December 22, 1949) is a Chinese Canadian author. She is a 2006 recipient of the Alex Award.

== Biography ==
Born in Kaiping, Guangdong, she immigrated to Canada with her mother in 1955 to reunite with her father in Allandale, Ontario. The family subsequently moved to Acton, Ontario where she spent most of her adolescence, eventually graduating from Guelph Collegiate Vocational Institute. She obtained her Bachelor of Arts from the University of Guelph, which was later followed by a Bachelor of Education from the University of Toronto. She was a teacher with the Toronto Board of Education for twenty years, working at the Garden Avenue and Fern Avenue public schools, and has also taught creative writing at the University of Toronto and Trent University.

== Works and honours ==
In 2004, she published Midnight at the Dragon Café, which was recognized in 2006 by the American Library Association as one of the year's notable books, and was subsequently honoured with an Alex Award in 2008, for having special appeal to young adults. In 2011, this book was chosen by the Toronto Public Library as the One Book Selection, a single work that Torontonians should read within the year.

In 2010, The Year of Finding Memory was selected by The Globe and Mail as one of the top 100 books of the year.

== Personal life ==
She currently resides with her husband on a farm near Toronto.

== Bibliography ==
=== Fiction ===
- —— (1997). China Dog and Other Tales from a Chinese Laundry. McClelland & Stewart. ISBN 9780771010736.
- —— (2004). Midnight at the Dragon Café. McClelland & Stewart. ISBN 9780771010972.

=== Non-fiction ===
- —— (2010). The Year of Finding Memory. Random House. ISBN 9780307356529.
