= Pickup (song) =

2022 single by MacKenzie Porter

Single by MacKenzie Porter

from the album Nobody's Born with a Broken Heart
- Released: November 19, 2021 (Note: "Pickup" was released to Canadian country radio on January 22, 2022.)
- Recorded: 2020
- Genre: Country pop
- Length: 2:48
- Label: Big Loud
- Songwriters: MacKenzie Porter; Lydia Vaughan; Will Bundy
- Producer: Joey Moi

MacKenzie Porter singles chronology
"This Sucks." (2021)	"Pickup" (2021)	"One Too" (2022)

Music video
- "Pickup" on YouTube

"Pickup" is a song co-written and recorded by Canadian country artist MacKenzie Porter. She wrote the track with Lydia Vaughan and Will Bundy, while it was produced by Joey Moi. It is the lead single from Porter's 2024 studio album Nobody's Born with a Broken Heart.

== Background ==
After holding many writing sessions over Zoom during the COVID-19 pandemic, Porter wrote "Pickup" with several co-writers in one of her first writing sessions back in-person. She stated that it "felt like a really special song," adding that she's "never been more excited to release a song".

== Critical reception ==
Rock N' Load stated that the song "features a bright, open-road feel, a rush of lush vocals and a hooky, modern-timeless presentation, as her mind and heart race with full-throttle nostalgia". Country 100 named the song their "Fresh Music Friday Song of the Day" for February 4, 2022.

== Accolades ==
Year	Association	Category	Result	Ref
2022	Canadian Country Music Awards	Songwriter(s) of the Year	Nominated	
2022	Canadian Country Music Awards	Video of the Year	Nominated	

== Commercial performance ==
"Pickup" reached a peak of number one on the Billboard Canada Country chart for the week of June 18, 2022, marking Porter's fourth career number one in her home country. The song also peaked at number 65 on the Canadian Hot 100 for the same week. It has also been certified Platinum by Music Canada.

== Music video ==
The official music video for "Pickup" premiered on CMT on March 12, 2022, and on Paramount's billboard in Times Square in New York City. It was directed by Justin Clough, and features a young girl playing with Barbie dolls, with Porter and two other actors occasionally taking the place of the dolls and portraying the story of the song. Her co-writer Lydia Vaughan came up with the "‘Barbie comes to life but doesn’t get the guy in the end’ idea" for the video, with Porter saying she "really wanted the video to tell the story of a breakup in a unique way". She added that "even though "someone’s life looks ‘perfect’ on paper, that never really reflects reality. Nobody’s life is perfect, and we all get our hearts broken at some point". Her dog Willa made an appearance in the video as well.

== Charts ==
Chart performance for "Pickup"
Chart (2022)	Peak position
Australia Country Hot 50 (The Music)	2
Canada (Canadian Hot 100)	65
Canada Country (Billboard)	1

== Certifications ==
Region	Certification	Certified units/sales
Canada (Music Canada)	Platinum	80,000^{‡}
^{‡} Sales+streaming figures based on certification alone.
