= Run on Love =

Single by Lucas Nord featuring Tove Lo

from the album Islands
- Released: 5 June 2013
- Recorded: 2013
- Genre: EDM; electropop
- Length: 3:58
- Label: Hybris; Radikal
- Songwriters: Ebba Nilsson; Lucas Nordqvist
- Producer: Lucas Nordqvist

Lucas Nord singles chronology
| "Embrace Me Part II" (2013) | "Run on Love" (2013) | "Wasting Time" (2014) |

Tove Lo singles chronology
| "Habits" (2013) | "Run on Love" (2013) | "Strangers" (2013) |

Music video
- "Run on Love" on YouTube

"Run on Love" is a song recorded by Swedish musician Lucas Nord. It features vocals by Swedish singer Tove Lo, who co-wrote the song. The single, taken from Nord's 2013 debut album Islands, reached number one on Billboard's Dance Club Songs chart the week ending 2 January 2016, giving Nord his first U.S. chart topper and Lo her third consecutive number one on this chart. The song's music video featured a relationship as seen from the eyes of a boyfriend (through the viewer of the video) as he spends time with his girlfriend (played by Lo) through the streets of Stockholm, Sweden. The QOTC Edit of the song was included on Lo's debut studio album Queen of the Clouds.

== Track listing ==
2013 release (Sweden)

- 1 "Run on Love" (featuring Tove Lo) (Radio Edit) – 3:58
- 2 "Run on Love" (featuring Tove Lo) (Extended Mix) – 4:50
- 3 "Run on Love" (featuring Tove Lo) (Emil Hero Remix) – 3:54
- 4 "Run on Love" (featuring Tove Lo) (Wickman Remix) – 6:35
- 5 "Run on Love" (featuring Tove Lo) (Callaway & Rosta Remix) – 6:21
- 6 "Run on Love" (featuring Tove Lo) (Joaquin Remix) – 4:45

2015 release (US)

- 1 "Run on Love" (featuring Tove Lo) (Radio Edit) – 3:58
- 2 "Run on Love" (featuring Tove Lo) (JKGD Radio Edit) – 3:29
- 3 "Run on Love" (featuring Tove Lo) (Extended Mix) – 4:50
- 4 "Run on Love" (featuring Tove Lo) (JKGD Extended Mix) – 4:43
- 5 "Run on Love" (featuring Tove Lo) (Babyboi Remix) – 5:30
- 6 "Run on Love" (featuring Tove Lo) (Pri Yon Joni Remix) – 6:30
- 7 "Run on Love" (featuring Tove Lo) (MARAUD3R Remix) – 6:01
- 8 "Run on Love" (featuring Tove Lo) (Tonekind Remix) – 4:52
- 9 "Run on Love" (featuring Tove Lo) (Funky Junction Remix) – 4:44

2015 re-release (US)

- 1. "Run on Love" (featuring Tove Lo) (Dave Audé Club Mix) – 5:55
- 2. "Run on Love" (featuring Tove Lo) (Tony Moran & Deep Influence Mix) – 8:07
- 3. "Run on Love" (featuring Tove Lo) (Rasmus Faber Remix) – 5:31
- 4. "Run on Love" (featuring Tove Lo) (Emil Héro Remix) – 3:54
- 5. "Run on Love" (featuring Tove Lo) (Wickman Remix) – 6:35
- 6. "Run on Love" (featuring Tove Lo) (Callaway & Rosta Remix) – 6:21
- 7. "Run on Love" (featuring Tove Lo) (Joaquin Remix) – 4:45

== Charts ==
=== Weekly charts ===
| Chart (2015–16) | Peak position |
|---|---|
| US Hot Dance/Electronic Songs (Billboard) | 23 |
| US Dance Club Songs (Billboard) | 1 |

=== Year-end ===
| Chart (2016) | Peak position |
|---|---|
| US Dance Club Songs (Billboard) | 17 |
