= Lights Out (Virginia to Vegas song) =

Single by Virginia to Vegas

from the album Utopian
- Released: September 2, 2016
- Genre: Dance-pop
- Length: 3:32
- Label: Wax; Ultra
- Songwriters: Derik John Baker; Alyssa Reid; Jamie Appleby; David Thomson; Michael Wise; Kennedy Gordy
- Producer: Michael Wise

Virginia to Vegas singles chronology
| "Our Story" (2015) | "Lights Out" (2016) | "Selfish" (2017) |

"Lights Out" is a song recorded by American-born Canadian singer and songwriter Virginia to Vegas for his debut studio album, Utopian (2016). Vegas co-wrote the song (under his legal name Derik Baker) with Jamie Appleby, David Thomson, and Michael Wise, the latter of whom also produced the track. The song also samples the 1984 Rockwell hit "Somebody's Watching Me", earning Rockwell a co-writing credit. "Lights Out" was released September 2, 2016 as the fourth single from the album.

== Content ==
"Lights Out" is a "dark" dance-pop song with electronica influences and a "pulsing" beat. The song's hook – "I always feel like somebody's watching me" – is sampled from Rockwell's 1984 single, "Somebody's Watching Me". "We were trying to think of a dark sentiment and we used [the borrowed lyric] as a placeholder," Virginia to Vegas said to iHeartRadio about the sample. "And the more we wrote the song around it, we realized that we really couldn't live without that line."

== Reception ==
=== Critical ===
Kerry Doole of FYI Music News wrote that the song is "a pleasing combination of pulsing beats and Baker's gently affecting vocals."

=== Commercial ===
"Lights Out" debuted at number 94 on the Billboard Canadian Hot 100 chart dated October 29, 2016. It has so far reached a peak position of 40 on the chart dated January 21, 2017. The song entered the Canada CHR/Top 40 chart dated October 1, 2016 at number 38 and has reached a peak position of 10 as of the chart dated January 7, 2017. This makes "Lights Out" Virginia to Vegas's most successful single to date at contemporary hit radio, besting the number 11 peak of his debut single, "We Are Stars", in 2014. It debuted at number 50 on the Canada Hot AC chart dated October 22, 2016 and has since reached a peak position of 14 on the chart dated March 11, 2017. "Lights Out" debuted at number 32 on the Canada AC chart dated January 14, 2017 following the departure of Holiday-themed releases and has since peaked at number 14. As of November 2016, the single has surpassed 1,000,000 audio streams on Spotify.

== Music video ==
An accompanying music video was directed by AD Jennings and was uploaded to Virginia to Vegas's official YouTube channel on October 31, 2016. It made its official premiere on etalk on November 11, 2016.

== Live performances ==
Virginia to Vegas appeared on the 2016 Breakfast Television Christmas Party program on December 16, 2016 in Toronto, ON and performed "Lights Out" at the event's close.

== Charts ==
| Chart (2016–17) | Peak position |
|---|---|
| Canada Hot 100 (Billboard) | 40 |
| Canada AC (Billboard) | 14 |
| Canada CHR/Top 40 (Billboard) | 10 |
| Canada Hot AC (Billboard) | 14 |

== Certifications ==
| Region | Certification | Certified units/sales |
|---|---|---|
| Canada (Music Canada) | Platinum | 80,000^{‡} |
^{‡} Sales+streaming figures based on certification alone.

== Release history ==
| Country | Date | Format | Label | Catalog No. | Ref. |
|---|---|---|---|---|---|
| Canada | September 2, 2016 | Digital download | Wax | —N/a | |
| Worldwide | November 8, 2016 | Digital download | Ultra | CA0K50900261 | |
