= Charley Fox =

Canadian Air Force officer (1920–2008)

Charley Fox DFC and Bar, CD
- Born: Charles William Fox; February 26, 1920; Guelph, Ontario, Canada
- Died: October 18, 2008 (aged 88); Tillsonburg, Ontario, Canada
- Education: Guelph Collegiate Vocational Institute
- Spouse: Helen Jean Doughty (m. 1942; died 1993)
- Children: James William Fox; Susan Fox; Adrienne Black
- Military career
- Allegiance: Canada
- Branch: Royal Canadian Air Force
- Service years: 1939-1945
- Rank: Flight Lieutenant
- Nickname: "Charley"
- Units: No. 412 Squadron RCAF; No. 420 Squadron RCAF
- Wars: Second World War: D-Day
- Awards: Distinguished Flying Cross; Canadian Forces' Decoration
- Memorials: Charley Fox Memorial Overpass

Charles William Fox, DFC and Bar, CD (February 26, 1920 – October 18, 2008) was a Flight Lieutenant in the Royal Canadian Air Force in World War II. He attended Guelph Collegiate Vocational Institute.

== Biography ==
Fox, the son of an Irish immigrant, joined the RCAF in 1939 at the beginning of the war (his brother Ted joined the Royal Canadian Artillery). He graduated near the top of his class in 1941 and was offered a job as a flight instructor in Dunnville, Ontario. He remained in this position until 1943 when he began combat training in Bagotville, Quebec. He flew Spitfires over Europe, destroying or damaging 153 enemy vehicles (mostly trains), and was awarded the Distinguished Flying Cross (with bar).

In 1944, he began his tour of duty with the Canadian 412 Squadron. On D-Day he flew three patrols off the coast of France. On July 17, 1944, he flew from the Allied air base at Beny-sur-Mer in Normandy and strafed an unknown black car; he later learned that one of the passengers was German Field Marshal Erwin Rommel, who was seriously injured in the attack. This is disputed, as a South African and RAF (Chris Le Roux of 602 Squadron) pilot, and a French and RAF (Jacques Remlinger of 602 Squadron) pilot also claimed to have been responsible for the attack. Australian Fred Cowpe of 453 Squadron also claimed responsibility for the strafing attack, asserting that his guns' camera verified the assertion. He recorded this action in his aircraft log book. As Rommel was soon afterwards implicated in the assassination plot against Adolf Hitler, he was allowed to commit suicide and his death was announced as a result of injuries from the air attack. In 2004 Fox was officially credited with injuring Rommel, although he expressed regret about the attack, as Rommel was supposedly planning to secretly negotiate an earlier end to the war with the Allies.

Fox ended his tour of duty in January 1945, and served in the 420 Reserve after the war. He retired in 1956 and began to work at a shoe factory, from which he retired in 1998. On April 30, 2004, he was named honorary colonel of 412 Squadron in Ottawa, ultimately belonging to 8 Wing/CFB Trenton. For his long service in the RCAF, he was awarded the Canadian Forces' Decoration.

He died in a car accident near Tillsonburg, Ontario, on October 18, 2008.

== Legacy ==
Fourteen of Fox's planes were judged to be no longer usable after returning from missions due to excessive damage from enemy fire.

Charles Fox was noted as an educator of youth and spokesperson for veterans. He founded Torch Bearers, a non-profit organization aimed at educating young people about Canadian military exploits. He regularly took on speaking engagements to keep veterans' stories alive and fought with school boards to ensure Remembrance Day ceremonies were held annually.

According to Fox's family, he spent his life wondering why he survived numerous dates with death and was in the process of telling his story and those of other veterans in a book titled Why Not Me?, which the family hopes to finish. "It did give him a purpose in life and he was searching for that," according to his son.

Mr. Fox had one son (James William Fox), two daughters (Susan Fox and Adrienne Black), nine grandchildren, three step-grandchildren, and fourteen great-grandchildren.

=== Memorial ===
In 2011, local officials in coordination with the federal government, dedicated the Charley Fox Memorial Overpass in London, Ontario. The overpass - the first arterial road roundabout in the city - was built to facilitate the safe passage of pedestrians over a CN rail line, as well as easing traffic when a train passed. It was named in his honour in recognition for his service to Canada during the war and his efforts to educated young people about Canada's military past. The center of the roundabout features a sculpture created by artists Daniel Castillo and Jerry Vrabec. The artwork is part of the City of London Public Art collection.
