= Utopian (album) =

Studio album by Virginia to Vegas
- Released: December 2, 2016
- Recorded: 2013–16
- Genre: Dance-pop; electronica
- Length: 30:16
- Label: Wax; Universal; Ultra Records
- Producer: Kevin Figs; O.C.; Michael Wise

Virginia to Vegas chronology
Vol. I (2014)	Utopian (2016)	Hartland St. (2019)

Singles from Utopian
- 1. "We Are Stars" Released: January 7, 2014; 2. "Don't Fight the Music" Released: September 2, 2014; 3. "Our Story" Released: May 4, 2015; 4. "Lights Out" Released: September 2, 2016

Utopian is the debut studio album recorded by Canadian singer and songwriter Virginia to Vegas, released through Wax Records, Ultra Records, and Universal Music Group on December 2, 2016. It includes the Platinum-certified single, "We Are Stars", and the top-10 pop radio hit, "Lights Out".

== Background ==
Derik Baker began his career as a songwriter before focusing on singing, at which point he adopted the stage name Virginia to Vegas after failing to garner attention using his birth name. He was discovered on YouTube in 2013 by Wax Records executive Jamie Appleby and signed to the label that year. His debut single, "We Are Stars", was released in January 2014. The song, which features labelmate, Alyssa Reid, reached the top 15 on the Canadian Hot 100 and was certified Platinum by Music Canada.

A follow-up single, "Don't Fight the Music", was released in September 2014 which failed to replicate its predecessor's success. Both songs were included in an extended play, titled Vol. I, which was released that November. His radio success with the singles contributed to him being nominated for Pop Artist or Group of the Year at the 2015 SiriusXM Indie Awards. Over the next two years, Virginia to Vegas continued recording new material and released two further singles, which are included on Utopian. The album was announced in November 2016 and was released in Canada on December 2, 2016.

== Track listing ==
No.	Title	Writer(s)	Length
1.	"Find Me"	Derik John Baker; Dani Coey; Ethan Roberts	3:15
2.	"Wasted"	Baker; Jamie Appleby; Jordan Benjamin; Hayley Penner; Roberts; Michael Wise
3.	"Lights Out"	Baker; Alyssa Reid; Appleby; David Thomson; Wise; Kennedy Gordy (Note: "Lights Out" samples "Somebody's Watching Me", written by Kennedy Gordy (a.k.a. Rockwell), so Gordy is credited as a co-writer.)	3:32
4.	"F*** Me Up"	Baker; Penner; Wise	3:02
5.	"Polaroid"	Baker; April Geesbreght; Andrew Hyatt; Eric Olsen	2:48
6.	"Don't Fight the Music"	Baker; Appleby; Nathan Ferraro; Alyssa Reid	3:37
7.	"Our Story"	Baker; Ferraro; Kevin Figueiredo	3:38
8.	"We Are Stars" (featuring Alyssa Reid)	Baker; Appleby; Ferraro; Kevin Figs; O.C.; Alyssa Reid	3:54
9.	"Beautiful" (Utopian version)	Baker; Appleby; Ferraro; Alyssa Reid; Wise	3:26
Total length:			30:16

== Chart positions ==
=== Singles ===
Year	Single	Peak chart positions			
Year	Single	CAN	CAN AC	CAN CHR	CAN Hot AC
2014	"We Are Stars"	14	13	11	14
2014	"Don't Fight the Music"	97	30	33	36
2015	"Our Story"	—	—	47	32
2016	"Lights Out"	40	14	10	14

== Release history ==
Country	Date	Format	Label	Catalog No.	Ref.
Canada	December 2, 2016	CD	Universal		
Canada	December 2, 2016	Digital download	Wax	—N/a	
Japan	December 2, 2016	CD	Wax	WAX700189	
Worldwide	December 9, 2016	CD	Wax	TBA	
