= Have Your Beer =

2024 song by MacKenzie Porter

Single by MacKenzie Porter

from the album Nobody's Born with a Broken Heart
- Released: July 22, 2024
- Genre: Country pop
- Length: 2:42
- Label: Big Loud
- Songwriters: MacKenzie Porter; Lydia Vaughan; Parker Welling; Jason Massey
- Producer: Joey Moi

MacKenzie Porter singles chronology
"Easy to Miss" (2024)	"Have Your Beer" (2024)	"Coming Home to You" (2025)

Lyric Video
- "Have Your Beer" on YouTube

"Have Your Beer" is a song recorded by Canadian country artist MacKenzie Porter. She wrote the song with Lydia Vaughan, Parker Welling, and Jason Massey, and it was produced by Joey Moi. It was released to country radio stations in Canada and Australia as the fourth single from Porter's 2024 album, Nobody's Born with a Broken Heart.

== Background and release ==
In a press release, Porter framed the track as a song for "the girls" about "when he realizes what he lost," describing the emotions of the song as "I don’t think so," "your loss," and "don't even try it".

The song was originally released as an instant gratification track in April 2024, one week ahead of the album's release, before later being sent to country radio in July 2024.

== Critical reception ==
Jeffrey Kurtis of Today's Country Magazine favourably reviewed "Have Your Beer", calling it an "irresistible, tempo driven melody that's filled in a dynamic pop country drive" and "an insatiably empowering anthem of moving on". He noted how Porter "cleverly plays off the age-old idea of you can't have your cake and eat it [too]" with the lyric, "Can't have your beer and drink it too". Erica Zisman of Country Swag described the track as an "anthemic and stage-ready song" that "speaks to the 'boy bye' mentality after a break-up".

== Charts ==
"Have Your Beer" reached a peak of number nine of the Billboard Canada Country airplay chart for the week of February 1, 2025, which was the song's 26th week on the chart. In Australia, the song reached a peak of number one on the TMN Country Hot 50 in Week 46 of 2024, which was the song's tenth week on that chart.

Chart performance for "Have Your Beer"
Chart (2024–2025)	Peak position
Australia Country Hot 50 (The Music)	1
Canada Country (Billboard)	9
