= Happy Ever After You =

2025 song by Thelma & James

Single by Thelma & James (MacKenzie Porter and Jake Etheridge)

from the EP Starting Over
- Released: January 10, 2025
- Genre: Country
- Length: 3:17
- Label: Big Loud; Mercury; Republic
- Songwriters: MacKenzie Porter; Jake Etheridge
- Producer: Lonas

MacKenzie Porter singles chronology
"Coming Home to You" (2024)	"Happy Ever After You" (2025)

Lyric Video
- "Happy Ever After You" on YouTube

"Happy Ever After You" is the debut song recorded by Canadian-American country music duo Thelma & James, composed of MacKenzie Porter and Jake Etheridge. The wife-and-husband duo wrote the song together, while it was produced by Lonas. It is the lead single off Starting Over, the debut EP that the duo released in September 2025.

== Background and release ==
MacKenzie Porter and her husband Jake Etheridge met during a songwriting session, but "Happy Ever After You" marked their first songwriting collaboration in ten years. Porter remarked that the couple had sometimes joked before leaving home for separate songwriting sessions, with one of them asking "got any good hooks I can steal?", and that "Happy Ever After You" was a hook that one of them had suggested several months prior to them writing it together. While the two had long elected to keep their careers separate, Porter was facing challenges after her longtime team at Big Loud closed their artist management division, and she asked Etheridge to write a song with her one night to make her feel better.

Porter initially shared a clip of the two playing the song together on TikTok in December 2024, which received positive comments from a wide variety of fellows artists, including Luke Combs, Ella Langley, John Mayer, Brandi Carlile, and Ernest. The two subsequently released the song in January 2025, and it was later serviced to country radio stations in Canada and Australia. Porter and Etheridge weren't initially sure whether their collaboration would be temporary, but after deciding to pursue a project as a duo, they chose the name "Thelma & James". Thelma is Porter's middle name and her grandmother's first name, while James is Etheridge's legal first name, and was his grandfather's first name.

== Content ==
The song is sung from the perspective of two former lovers, one male and one female, both individually lamenting how they have not been happy after the end of their relationship.

== Critical reception ==
Maxim Mower of Holler described the song as "beautifully stripped-back and intimate," opining that it "draws equally from MacKenzie Porter's Nashvillian, country-pop songwriting style and Jake Etheridge's sparser, folk-leaning sound". He called it a "bold, compelling mission statement" from the marital duo.

== Music video ==
The official lyric video for "Happy Ever After You" premiered on YouTube on January 10, 2025, the same day as the song's release. It features Porter and Etheridge singing the song on the roof of their house.

== Credits and personnel ==
Credits adapted from AllMusic.

- Adam Grover – mastering engineer
- Jake Etheridge – acoustic guitar, banjo, composition, keyboards, production, vocals
- James Paul Mitchell – pedal steel guitar
- Lonas – bass, drums, editing, mixing, production, recording
- MacKenzie Porter — composition, production, vocals

== Charts ==
Chart performance for "Happy Ever After You"
Chart (2025)	Peak position
Australia Country Hot 50 (The Music)	17
Canada (Canadian Hot 100)	92
Canada Country (Billboard)	11
