= Johannes le Roux =

South African flying ace (1920–1944)

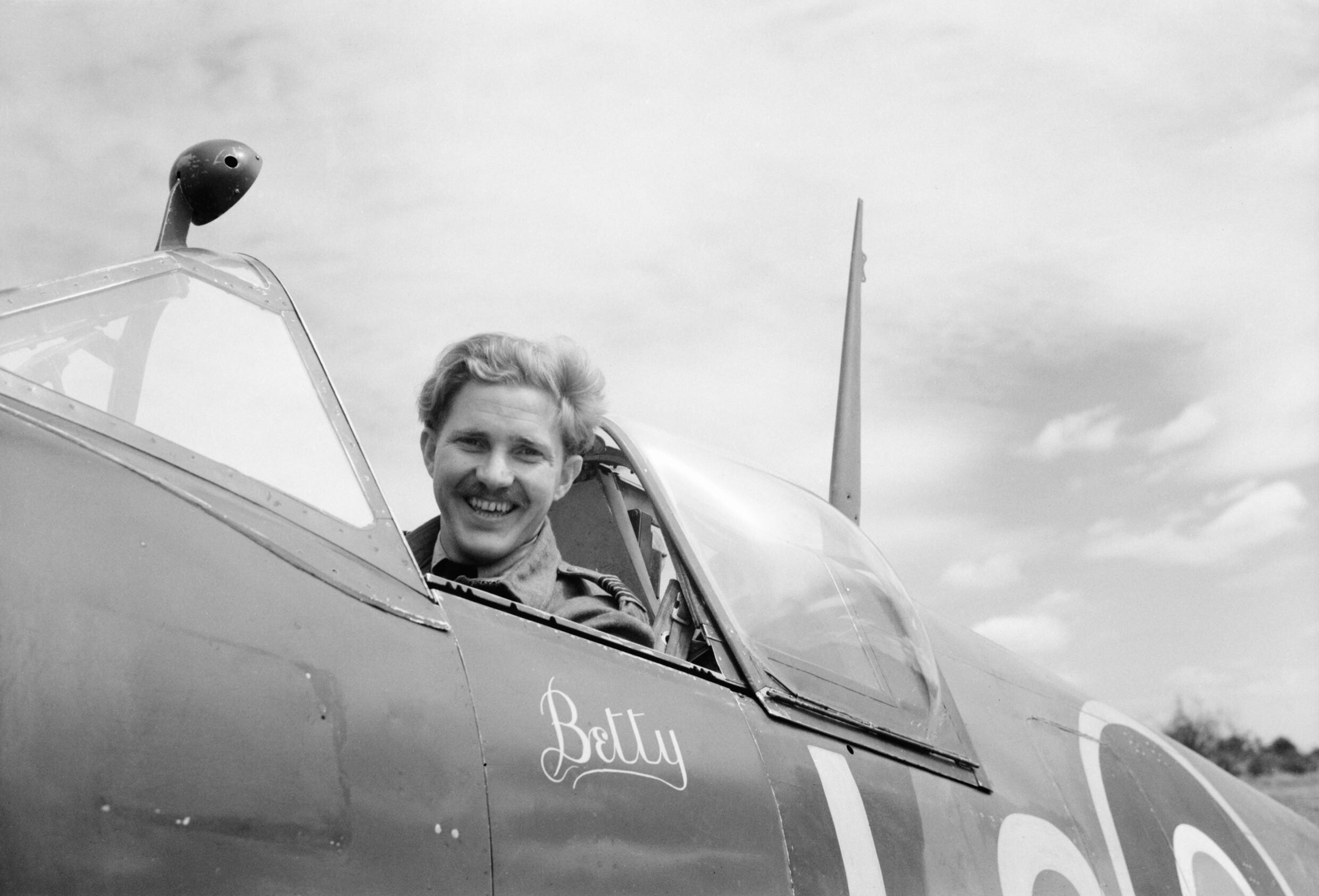
- Born: Johannes Jacobus le Roux; 12 April 1920; Heidelberg, Transvaal
- Died: 29 August 1944 (aged 24)
- Military career
- Allegiance: United Kingdom
- Branch: Royal Air Force
- Service years: 1939–1944
- Rank: Squadron Leader
- Nickname: "Chris"
- Commands: No. 602 Squadron (1944); No. 111 Squadron (1943)
- Conflicts: Second World War: Circus offensive; Tunisian campaign; Operation Overlord
- Awards: Distinguished Flying Cross & Two Bars

Johannes Jacobus "Chris" le Roux, DFC & Two Bars (12 April 1920 – 29 August 1944) was a South African-born flying ace of the Royal Air Force (RAF) during the Second World War. He is credited with having shot down at least eighteen German aircraft.

From the Transvaal, le Roux joined the RAF in 1939. He was still in training at the time of the outbreak of the Second World War but served for a time with No. 85 Squadron during the Battle of France until he was wounded. When he recovered he carried out instructing duties before being posted to No. 91 Squadron. Flying Supermarine Spitfire fighters, he claimed several aerial victories and was awarded the Distinguished Flying Cross (DFC). He spent most of 1942 on instructing and testing duties before returning briefly to No. 91 Squadron and was awarded a Bar to his DFC. At the start of 1943, le Roux was sent to North Africa to serve with No. 111 Squadron, becoming its commander soon after his arrival. He was the recipient of a second Bar to his DFC for his services in North Africa. Back in Europe by mid-1944, he led No. 602 Squadron in its operations in Normandy, achieving further aerial victories. He may have strafed the car in which Erwin Rommel, the senior commander in Normandy, was traveling, causing injuries that led to the latter relinquishing command of German forces in the area. Le Roux went missing on 29 August when his aircraft was lost while he was flying his Spitfire to England.

== Early life ==
Born on 12 April 1920 in Heidelberg in the Transvaal, South Africa, Johannes Jacobus le Roux, known informally as Chris, was educated in Springs. After completing his education, he applied to join the South African Air Force (SAAF) but was rejected. Spaces in the SAAF were limited. Le Roux subsequently worked in the mining industry to save funds to travel to the United Kingdom. He achieved this in early 1939, joining the Royal Air Force (RAF) in February 1939.

== Second World War ==
Confirmed in his rank as pilot officer on 1 May 1940, le Roux was at No. 6 Operational Training Unit (OTU) at the time of the invasion of France. He was posted to No. 85 Squadron on 16 May, which was heavily engaged with its Hawker Hurricane fighters in France. At some point during the French campaign, le Roux was wounded and hospitalised for several weeks. On his recovery, he carried out instructing duties until February 1941, at which time he was posted to No. 91 Squadron. His new unit, equipped with the Supermarine Spitfire fighter and based at Hawkinge, was tasking with patrolling the coastline along Kent as well as being engaged in sorties to German-occupied Europe as part of the RAF's Circus offensive.

=== Circus offensive ===
Promoted to flying officer in April, le Roux damaged a Messerschmitt Bf 109 fighter near Folkestone on 16 May. This was followed by his damaging of a Junkers Ju 88 medium bomber at Cap Gris-Nez on 31 July. He destroyed a Bf 109 near Boulogne on 17 August. Another Bf 109 was shot down by le Roux on 29 August, this time near Calais. He destroyed a pair of Bf 109s to the west of Berck-sur-Mer on 4 September. A Bf 109 was deemed to have been probably destroyed by Le Roux to the northwest of Boulogne on 22 September. His successes saw him awarded the Distinguished Flying Cross (DFC). The citation, published in The London Gazette on 17 October, read:

This officer has carried out over 200 operational sorties which have included shipping reconnaissances, during which much valuable information has been obtained, and numerous attacks on shipping and enemy aerodromes in the face of heavy enemy fire. Flight Lieutenant Le Roux has destroyed 3 hostile aircraft in combat and at least 1 on the ground.

— London Gazette, No. 35312, 17 October 1941

Now a flight commander with the squadron, le Roux shot down a Bf 109 over Calais on 28 October. His last aerial victory of the year was on 11 November, when he destroyed a Bf 109 near Dover. He was rested from operations the next month, and was assigned to instructing duties at No. 55 OTU until March 1942. He then served at Rolls-Royce until September at which time he returned to operations with No. 91 Squadron, still at Hawkinge, on a temporary assignment.

Le Roux shot damaged a pair of Focke Wulf 190 fighters over their own airfield on 30 September. He shot down a pair of Fw 190s over the English Channel on 31 October. He was awarded a Bar to his DFC in December. The published citation read:

Since being awarded the Distinguished Flying Cross this officer has destroyed a further five enemy aircraft. In addition to his air victories he has attacked shipping and targets on the ground with considerable success. At all times Flight Lieutenant Le Roux has displayed a fine fighting spirit.

— London Gazette, No. 35819, 11 December 1942

=== Squadron command ===
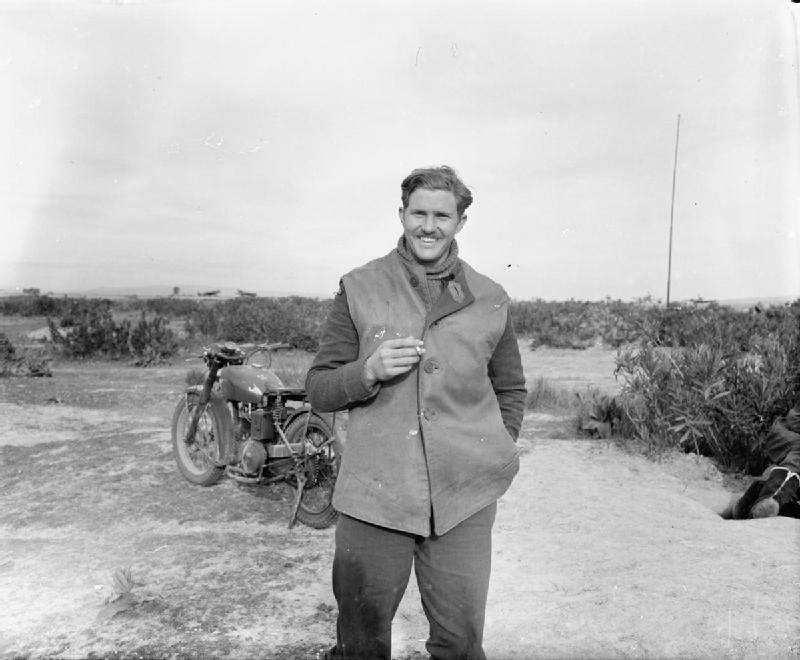
Le Roux standing in front of his motorcycle at Souk-el-Khemis airfield, Tunisia

In early January 1943, le Roux was posted to No. 111 Squadron. This was based at Souk-el-Khemis airfield in Tunisia and operated Spitfires during the Tunisian campaign. He made his first claim with the squadron on 13 January, for a damaged Bf 109. This was followed four days later with his destruction of a Bf 109 to the east of Bou Arada, with a second claimed as probably destroyed. He was given command of the squadron at the end of the month.

Le Roux shot down a Fw 190 north of Béja on 3 April and three days later, damaged a Bf 109 near Enfidaville. On 23 April he destroyed two German aircraft, a Bf 109 and Fw 190 respectively, near Medjez el Bab. His tenure as commander of the squadron ended on 30 April, and he took up a posting as a fighter controller. He was awarded a second Bar to his DFC in July.

In July 1944, le Roux was given command of No. 602 Squadron, which was based at an airfield in Longues-sur-Mer in France as part of the RAF's Second Tactical Air Force. The squadron patrolled the airspace over the Allied ground forces in the region, and also carried out ground attack missions. On the morning of 15 July, not long after le Roux took command of the squadron, he shot down a Fw 190 near Caen. On another sortie later in the day, he destroyed a Bf 109 to the south of Caen. The next day he shot down a Fw 190 over Bayeux.

On 17 July le Roux carried out a sortie in which he destroyed a Bf 109 near Flers and damaged a second. Afterwards he strafed a German vehicle. This may have been the staff car in which Erwin Rommel was a passenger while travelling through Sainte-Foy-de-Montgommery. The driver lost control and the car then struck a tree and spun off the road, ejecting Rommel who fractured his skull. Rommel's injuries resulted him conceding command of German forces in Normandy. Jacques Remlinger, another pilot of No. 602 Squadron, and Canadian pilot Charley Fox may also have been responsible for the attack. On a subsequent sortie that day, Le Roux damaged a Bf 109 and shot down another.

On 29 August le Roux was due to return to England in his Spitfire. An initial attempt to make the flight was aborted due to bad weather, but later in the day he took off. He was reported missing after his aircraft failed to arrive in England. He had made one final claim for an aerial victory in the days prior, a Fw 190 that was destroyed to the southwest of Vire. Having no known grave, le Roux is commemorated on the Commonwealth War Graves Commission's Air Forces Memorial near Egham in Surrey, England. He was survived by his wife and two children.

Le Roux is credited with the destruction of eighteen German aircraft, with two more probably destroyed. He is also believed to have damaged eight aircraft. He was one of only two South Africans to have been awarded the DFC and two Bars.
