= Bet You Break My Heart =

2023 single by MacKenzie Porter

Single by MacKenzie Porter

from the album Nobody's Born with a Broken Heart
- Released: November 17, 2023
- Genre: Country pop
- Length: 2:38
- Label: Big Loud
- Songwriter(s): Chris Tompkins; Mark Holman; Travis Wood
- Producer(s): Joey Moi

MacKenzie Porter singles chronology
"Chasing Tornadoes" (2023)	"Bet You Break My Heart" (2023)	"Easy to Miss" (2024)

Music video
- "Bet You Break My Heart" on YouTube

"Bet You Break My Heart" is a song recorded by Canadian country artist MacKenzie Porter. The song was written by Chris Tompkins, Mark Holman, and Travis Wood, while Joey Moi produced the track. It was released to country radio stations in Canada and Australia, and is the third single from Porter's 2024 album Nobody's Born with a Broken Heart.

== Background ==
In a press release, Porter stated about the song, "Heartbreak is something we all experience. We've all fallen for someone or something knowing it would probably end up hurting us. Taking that risk is both the most exciting and scary feeling, and I love that this song is able to put words to the back and forth you have in your head throughout those types of relationships".

== Critical reception ==
Meghan Grisham of Circle All Access favourably reviewed "Bet You Break My Heart", describing it as "a catchy tune that dives deep into the ups and downs of a relationship". She added that the song "captures the realness of love and the pain that often comes with it", noting "relatable lyrics" and a "soulful vibe".

== Music video ==
The official music video for "Bet You Break My Heart" premiered on YouTube on November 17, 2023.

== Charts ==
Chart performance for "Bet You Break My Heart"
Chart (2024)	Peak position
Australia Country Hot 50 (The Music)	15
Canada Country (Billboard)	11
