= MacKenzie Porter =

Canadian actress, singer (born 1990)

- Born: MacKenzie Lea Porter; January 29, 1990 (age 36); Medicine Hat, Alberta, Canada
- Genres: Country; country pop
- Occupations: Singer-songwriter; actress
- Instruments: Vocals; piano; violin
- Years active: 2007–present
- Labels: Big Loud; Road Angel
- Member of: Thelma & James
- Spouse: Jake Etheridge (m. 2020)
- Website: www.mackenzieporter.com

MacKenzie Lea Porter (born January 29, 1990) is a Canadian country singer, songwriter, and actress. She has released two albums (MacKenzie Porter and Nobody's Born with a Broken Heart) and achieved four Canada Country number ones with "About You", "These Days", "Seeing Other People", and "Pickup". She was featured on Dustin Lynch's number one Country Airplay hit "Thinking 'Bout You". She is also one-half of Thelma & James, a musical duo with her husband Jake Etheridge. As an actor, she is best known for her leading role as a future-sent medic in the television series Travelers.

== Early life ==
MacKenzie Porter was raised on a cattle and bison ranch near Medicine Hat, Alberta. She began studying piano, violin, and voice at age four. While growing up she toured in a family band with her brother, 2004 Canadian Idol winner Kalan Porter. Their grandfather Bob Porter was Member of Parliament for Medicine Hat from 1988 to 1993.

== Film and TV career ==
Porter has appeared in numerous films and television productions, including Dinosapien (2007), Hell on Wheels, and Travelers (2016). She earned a Best Actress in Alberta award for her role in the 2008 television film The Other Woman. She was also named as one of the Top 11 Hottest Vancouver Actors to Watch for in 2011 by BC Living magazine.

== Music career ==
=== Early career: Self-titled album ===
After moving to Vancouver to pursue acting, Porter teamed up with musician and actor Andrew Jenkins to form the band The Black Boots. In 2010, she launched a solo career. Porter was the winner of the 2011 Nashville North Star competition. She has opened for Kenny Chesney, Doc Walker, and Trooper among others, and has performed for Prime Minister Stephen Harper.

In October 2012, Porter released her debut single, "I Wish I'd Known". Her second single, "Never Gonna Let You", was co-written and produced by Carolyn Dawn Johnson. Porter was chosen as one of six acts for the inaugural Canadian Country Music Association Discovery Program in 2013. She was also nominated for the Rising Star Award at the 2013 Canadian Country Music Association Awards. Her debut album was released on July 15, 2014. She is featured on the song "Circles" on Chris Lane's album Girl Problems in 2016.

=== 2018–2022: Drinkin' Songs, Big Loud Records, five number ones ===
In 2018, Porter signed with Nashville-based Big Loud and became their first Canadian artist. She released the single "About You", co-written by Hardy. The song would hit number one on Canada Country. Porter is featured on the Dallas Smith song "Friends Don't Let Friends Drink Alone" with Dean Brody.

In March 2019, Porter released the single "These Days", which charted on Canadian country, pop, and adult hits charts as well as on the US Hot Country Songs and Country Airplay charts. It also reached number one on Canada Country, making Porter the first Canadian woman to land back-to-back Number Ones since Shania Twain. She then opened for Dallas Smith and Dean Brody on their co-headlining cross-Canada Friends Don't Let Friends Tour Alone Tour. In February 2020, Porter released "Seeing Other People" which would become her third consecutive number one, making her the first woman (Canadian or American) to land three consecutive Number Ones on Canadian country radio since Twain.

Porter's EP Drinkin' Songs: The Collection was released in November 2020. The EP was her debut American release and included her three chart-toppers in addition to her top five hit "Drinkin' Songs". It received a nomination for Country Album of the Year at the 2021 Juno Awards. In March 2021, she featured on the Dustin Lynch single "Thinking 'Bout You", and then joined Canadian pop artist Virginia to Vegas on the single "This Sucks." in September 2021. She released the song "Pickup" later that year; it became a single in early 2022. "Thinking 'Bout You" spent six weeks atop the Country Airplay chart, marking Porter's first number one in the U.S., and spent a record-breaking 28 weeks in the top ten. Meanwhile, "Pickup" would go on to reach number one on Canada Country, and achieve gold-certification. Later that year, she joined fellow Canadian country artist Dallas Smith on the single "One Too".

=== 2023–2024: Nobody's Born with a Broken Heart ===
In March 2023, Porter participated in an all-star recording of Serena Ryder's single "What I Wouldn't Do", which was released as a charity single to benefit Kids Help Phone's Feel Out Loud campaign for youth mental health. In May 2023, she released "Chasing Tornadoes", the second single off her upcoming full-length album. In the fall of 2023, Porter embarked on her first tour named "The Canadian Headlining Tour". While on tour, she released the single "Bet You Break My Heart". Porter also joined Canadian pop singer Elijah Woods on a new version of his song "Last Girl".

In January 2024, Porter announced the release of her second full-length studio album, Nobody's Born with a Broken Heart on Big Loud Records. The nineteen-track album was released on April 26, 2024, and includes the singles "Pickup", "Chasing Tornadoes", "Bet You Break My Heart", and "Have Your Beer", as well as four songs that were released concurrently with the album's announcement, including "Easy to Miss". Porter received six nominations at the 2024 Canadian Country Music Awards, and won Female Artist of the Year. She also co-hosted the award show alongside Thomas Rhett.

=== 2025: Thelma and James ===
In January 2025, Porter and her husband Jake Etheridge collaborated on the song "Happy Ever After You", released under the duo name "Thelma & James". In March 2025, the duo released the song "First Love", and officially signed a recording deal with Big Loud, with Porter remaining on their label roster as a solo artist as well. The duo released their debut extended play Starting Over on September 19, 2025.

== Personal life ==
In 2014, Porter and American actor/singer-songwriter Jake Etheridge began dating. Etheridge appeared in the 2019 music video for Porter's 2018 song "About You". She and Etheridge were engaged in mid-/late May or early June 2019, and they married in July 2020.

In November 2023, Porter announced she was pregnant with her and Etheridge's first child. On March 14, 2024, Porter and her husband welcomed their first child, a daughter.

== Tours ==
- The Canadian Headline Tour (2023)

== Filmography ==
Year	Title	Role	Notes
2007	Dinosapien	Courtney	11 episodes
2007	Christmas in Wonderland	Shane	
2008	The Other Woman	Lauren	Television film
2008	45 R.P.M.	Debbie Baxter	
2009	Wild Roses	Viki	2 episodes
2010	Supernatural	Kim	Episode: "Clap Your Hands If You Believe"
2010	Ice Quake	Girl	Television film
2011	Endgame	Kim Sharland	Episode: "The Other Side of Summer"
2011	R.L. Stine's The Haunting Hour	Alexa	Episode: "Pool Shark"
2011	Finding a Family	Jen Bante	Television film
2012	Gay Dude	Country Singer	
2012	Chained	Iphigenia	Short film
2012	R.L. Stine's The Haunting Hour	Lanie	Episode: "Stage Fright"
2012	Seattle Superstorm	Chloe Peterson	Television film
2012	A Killer Among Us	Marissa Drake	Television film
2012	The Horses of McBride	Nicki Davidson	Television film
2013	All's Fair in Love and Advertising	Kelly Burns	Television film
2013	Leap 4 Your Life	Brooke	
2013	Emma's Wings: A Bella Sara Tale	Emma	Voice
2013	Guess Who's Coming to Christmas	Kelly Harding	Television film
2014	Blackstone	Brianna	2 episodes
2014–2016	Hell on Wheels	Naomi Bohannon	12 episodes
2016–2018	Travelers	Marcy Warton	Main role
2018	Darrow & Darrow: In The Key Of Murder	Phoebe	Television film (Hallmark)
2022	The Cowboy and the Movie Star	Isabella	Television film (Hallmark)
2025	The Runarounds	Phoebe	Guest role
2025–	9-1-1: Nashville	Samantha Hart	Recurring role

== Discography ==
=== Studio albums ===
Title	Details
MacKenzie Porter	Release date: July 15, 2014; Label: Road Angel
Nobody's Born with a Broken Heart	Release date: April 26, 2024; Label: Big Loud

=== Extended plays ===
Title	Details
Drinkin' Songs: The Collection	Release date: November 6, 2020; Label: Big Loud

=== Singles ===
==== As lead artist ====
Year	Title	Peak chart positions							Certifications	Album
Year	Title	CAN	CAN AC	CAN CHR	CAN Country	CAN Hot AC	US Country Songs	US Country Airplay	Certifications	Album
2012	"I Wish I'd Known"	—	—	—	34	—	—	—		MacKenzie Porter
2013	"Never Gonna Let You"	96	—	—	11	—	—	—		MacKenzie Porter
2014	"If You Ask Me To"	—	—	—	17	—	—	—		MacKenzie Porter
2014	"Misfit Parade"	—	—	—	—	—	—	—		MacKenzie Porter
2015	"Rodeo"	—	—	—	32	—	—	—		Non-album single
2018	"About You"	—	—	—	1	—	—	—	MC: Gold	Drinkin' Songs: The Collection
2019	"These Days"	44	9	11	1	10	45	56	MC: 2× Platinum	Drinkin' Songs: The Collection
2020	"Seeing Other People"	92	—	—	1	—	—	—	MC: Gold	Drinkin' Songs: The Collection
2020	"Drinkin' Songs"	74	—	—	5	—	—	—	MC: Gold	Drinkin' Songs: The Collection
2021	"This Sucks." (with Virginia to Vegas)	—	—	26	—	42	—	—		Remember That Time We
2022	"Pickup"	65	—	—	1	—	—	—	MC: Platinum	Nobody's Born with a Broken Heart
2022	"One Too" (with Dallas Smith)	90	—	—	6	—	—	—	MC: Gold	Dallas Smith
2023	"Chasing Tornadoes"	—	—	—	3	—	—	—	MC: Gold	Nobody's Born with a Broken Heart
2023	"Bet You Break My Heart"	—	—	—	11	—	—	—		Nobody's Born with a Broken Heart
2024	"Easy to Miss" (Note: "Easy to Miss" has only been released as a single in the United Kingdom.)	—	—	—	—	—	—	—		Nobody's Born with a Broken Heart
2024	"Have Your Beer"	—	—	—	9	—	—	—		Nobody's Born with a Broken Heart
2024	"Coming Home to You" (featuring Owen Riegling)	—	—	—	12	—	—	—		—N/a
"—" denotes releases that did not chart or were not released in that territory

==== As part of Thelma & James ====
Year	Title	Peak chart positions			Album
Year	Title	AUS Country	CAN	CAN Country	Album
2025	"Happy Ever After You" (with Jake Etheridge)	17	92	11	Starting Over

==== As featured artist ====
Year	Title	Peak chart positions					Certifications	Album
Year	Title	CAN	CAN Country	US	US Country Songs	US Country Airplay	Certifications	Album
2021	"Thinking 'Bout You" (with Dustin Lynch)	46	2	30	2	1	RIAA: 4× Platinum; MC: 2× Platinum; RMNZ: Gold	Blue in the Sky

=== Music videos ===
Year	Title	Director
2012	"I Wish I'd Known"	David Tenniswood
2013	"Never Gonna Let You"	David Tenniswood
2014	"If You Ask Me To"	David Tenniswood
2014	"Misfit Parade"	David Tenniswood
2015	"Rodeo"	David Tenniswood
2019	"About You"	Justin Clough
2020	"These Days"	Justin Clough
2020	"Seeing Other People"	Justin Clough
2021	"Drinkin' Songs"	Justin Clough
2021	"Thinking 'Bout You" (with Dustin Lynch)	Justin Nolan Key
2021	"This Sucks." (with Virginia to Vegas)	
2021	"Unlonely Me"	Justin Clough
2022	"Pickup"	Justin Clough
2022	"One Too" (with Dallas Smith)	Unknown
2023	"Chasing Tornadoes"	Justin Clough
2024	"Easy to Miss"	Justin Clough
2024	"Confession"	Justin Clough

== Awards and nominations ==
Year	Award	Category	Result
2013	Canadian Country Music Association	Rising Star	Nominated
2013	Leo Awards	Best Female Lead in a Television Movie	Nominated
2014	Canadian Country Music Association	Female Artist of the Year	Nominated
2015	Juno Awards of 2015	Country Album of the Year – MacKenzie Porter	Nominated
2015	Canadian Country Music Association	Female Artist of the Year	Nominated
2015	Canadian Country Music Association	Video of the Year – "If You Ask Me To"	Nominated
2015	Canadian Country Music Association	All Star Band – Fiddle	Nominated
2016	Canadian Country Music Association	Female Artist of the Year	Nominated
2020	Canadian Country Music Association	Fans’ Choice Award	Nominated
2020	Canadian Country Music Association	Female Artist of the Year	Nominated
2020	Canadian Country Music Association	Songwriter(s) Of The Year – "These Days" (shared with Jordan Sapp, Parker Welling)	Nominated
2021	Juno Awards of 2021	Country Album of the Year – Drinkin' Songs: The Collection	Nominated
2021	2021 Canadian Country Music Awards	Entertainer of the Year	Nominated
2021	2021 Canadian Country Music Awards	Fans’ Choice Award	Nominated
2021	2021 Canadian Country Music Awards	Female Artist of the Year	Nominated
2021	2021 Canadian Country Music Awards	Video of the Year – "Drinkin' Songs"	Nominated
2022	Canadian Country Music Awards	Songwriter(s) of the Year – "Pickup" (shared with Will Bundy, Lydia Vaughan)	Nominated
2022	Canadian Country Music Awards	Video of the Year	Nominated
2022	Canadian Country Music Awards	Female Artist of the Year	Nominated
2023	Juno Awards of 2023	Fan Choice	Nominated
2023	2023 Canadian Country Music Awards	Female Artist of the Year	Nominated
2023	2023 Canadian Country Music Awards	Musical Collaboration of the Year – "One Too" (with Dallas Smith)	Won
2023	2023 Canadian Country Music Awards	Video of the Year – "One Too"	Nominated
2024	Canadian Country Music Association	Album of the Year - Nobody's Born with a Broken Heart	Nominated
2024	Canadian Country Music Association	Entertainer of the Year	Nominated
2024	Canadian Country Music Association	Fans' Choice	Nominated
2024	Canadian Country Music Association	Female Artist of the Year	Won
2024	Canadian Country Music Association	Single of the Year – "Chasing Tornadoes"	Nominated
2024	Canadian Country Music Association	Video of the Year – "Chasing Tornadoes"	Won
2025	Juno Awards	Country Album of the Year – Nobody's Born with a Broken Heart	Nominated
2025	Canadian Country Music Association	Entertainer of the Year	Nominated
2025	Canadian Country Music Association	Fans' Choice	Nominated
2025	Canadian Country Music Association	Female Artist of the Year	Won
2026	Academy of Country Music Awards	Duo of the Year – Thelma & James	Nominated
