= These Days (MacKenzie Porter song) =

Single by MacKenzie Porter

from the EP Drinkin' Songs: The Collection
- Released: March 22, 2019
- Genre: Country pop
- Length: 2:52 (single version): 3:16 (remix)
- Label: Big Loud
- Songwriters: MacKenzie Porter; Jordan Sapp; Parker Welling
- Producers: Joey Moi; Dave Cohen

MacKenzie Porter singles chronology
"About You" (2018)	"These Days" (2019)	"Seeing Other People" (2020)

Music video
- "These Days" on YouTube

"These Days" (Remix)
- Remix cover

"These Days" is a song recorded and co-written by Canadian country music artist MacKenzie Porter. It was released in March 2019 through Big Loud Records. The song impacted Canadian country radio on June 25, 2019, and American country radio on April 27, 2020. A remixed version, released on March 13, 2020, was sent to Canadian pop, contemporary, and adult hits radio.

== Critical reception ==
Aynslee Darmon of ET Canada called the song an "upbeat tune" that “offers nostalgia" while Billboard noted Porter's "mesmerizing vocals". The song was named Top Country Pick of the Week on September 27, 2019.

== Commercial performance ==
"These Days" peaked at number 44 on the Canadian Hot 100 for the week of October 27, 2020, marking her first charting entry on her national chart since "Never Gonna Let You" in 2013. It was a number one hit on the Billboard Canada Country chart on December 21, 2019, making Porter the first female Canadian country artist to land consecutive number-ones since Shania Twain in 1998. The song is Porter's first charting entry on the Hot Country Songs and Country Airplay charts in the United States. With the remix, Porter became the first Canadian country artist to chart on the Canadian pop radio chart since Twain, with the highest pop debut for a Canadian country artist since Twain's "Man! I Feel Like a Woman!" in 1999. In 2021, "These Days" hit #1 on The Music Network's Country Hot 50 chart in Australia, making her the first Canadian to top that chart since Twain in 2005. The song was certified Platinum by Music Canada on November 3, 2020, with over 80,000 sales, later achieving Double Platinum status in 2023. As of November 2020, the song had received over 14.5 million streams through Spotify.

== Music video ==
The music video was directed by Justin Clough and premiered on January 31, 2020. The video was shot in Watertown, Tennessee, and features Porter as well as an actor portraying her ex from the song.

== Charts ==
Chart (2019–2023)	Peak position
Australia Country Hot 50 (TMN)	1
Canada (Canadian Hot 100)	44
Canada AC (Billboard)	9
Canada CHR/Top 40 (Billboard)	11
Canada Country (Billboard)	1
Canada Hot AC (Billboard)	10
US Hot Country Songs (Billboard)	45
US Country Airplay (Billboard)	56

== Certifications ==
Region	Certification	Certified units/sales
Canada (Music Canada)	2× Platinum	160,000^{‡}
^{‡} Sales+streaming figures based on certification alone.
