= Chasing Tornadoes =

2023 single by MacKenzie Porter

Single by MacKenzie Porter

from the album Nobody's Born with a Broken Heart
- Released: May 5, 2023
- Genre: Country
- Length: 2:57
- Label: Big Loud
- Songwriter(s): Emily Landis; Jamie Moore; Lainey Wilson
- Producer(s): Joey Moi

MacKenzie Porter singles chronology
"One Too" (2022)	"Chasing Tornadoes" (2023)	"Bet You Break My Heart" (2023)

Music video
- "Chasing Tornadoes" on YouTube

"Chasing Tornadoes" is a song recorded by Canadian country music artist MacKenzie Porter. The song was written by fellow country artist Lainey Wilson, along with Emily Landis and Jamie Moore, while it produced by Joey Moi. It is the second single off Porter's debut full-length U.S. album with Big Loud Records, Nobody's Born with a Broken Heart. The song reached number one on the Mediabase Canada Country chart.

== Background ==
Porter described the song as "fun" and "feel-good", saying it was "the perfect intro to what the rest of the record feels like", in reference to her upcoming album.

== Critical reception ==
James Daykin of Entertainment Focus called the song a "mix of timeless country and shimmering pop", adding that it was "perfect for a summertime drive down a dirt road". An uncredited review from All Country News described "Chasing Tornadoes" as "equal parts strong as it is sassy", adding that it was "quite impressive" how Porter "vividly [captures] the idea of a fast paced love", and that her "voice soars" in the song. Cait Watters of Six Shooter Country stated that Porter's "swagger" is what "sells" the song, "makes it feel fresh and something to note", while also noting the "power" of Porter's voice, saying that she "eases through line after line seamlessly, flowing fast like the titular weather phenomenon".

== Accolades ==
Year	Association	Category	Result	Ref.
2024	Canadian Country Music Association	Single of the Year	Nominated	
2024	Canadian Country Music Association	Video of the Year	Won	

== Music video ==
Porter released the official music video for "Chasing Tornadoes" on May 8, 2023. It was directed by Justin Clough and filmed in Las Vegas, Nevada. Porter starred in the video alongside a male co-lead, and remarked that she "wanted it to be cut super fast to feel slightly hectic," adding that she thought they "really captured the essence of a toxic relationship that you keep coming back to, even if you know it might break your heart".

== Live performance ==
Porter performed "Chasing Tornadoes" live at the 2023 NHL Awards in Nashville, Tennessee.

== Charts ==
Chart performance for "Chasing Tornadoes"
Chart (2023)	Peak position
Australia Country Hot 50 (The Music)	29
Canada Country (Billboard)	3

== Certifications ==
Certifications for "Chasing Tornadoes"
Region	Certification	Certified units/sales
Canada (Music Canada)	Gold	40,000^{‡}
^{‡} Sales+streaming figures based on certification alone.
