= Virginia to Vegas =

Canadian musician

Virginia To Vegas
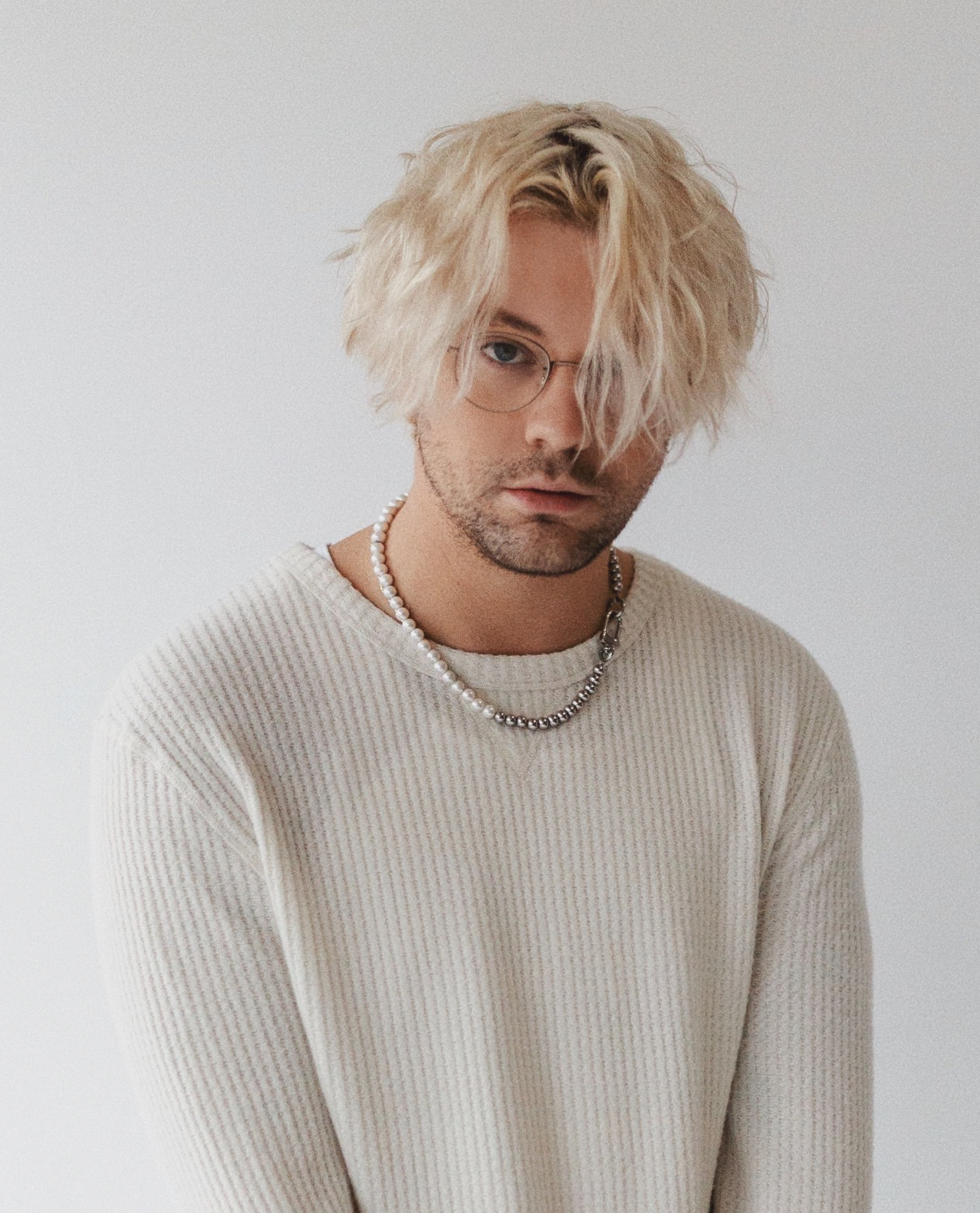

Background information
- Born: Derik John Baker; Richmond, Virginia, United States
- Origin: Guelph, Ontario, Canada
- Genres: Indie pop; dance-pop; electronica
- Occupations: Musician; singer; songwriter; producer
- Instruments: Vocals; guitar; bass
- Years active: 2013–present
- Labels: Wax Records; Ultra Records; Universal Music Group; Republic Records
- Website: www.virginiatovegas.com

Derik John Baker, better known as Virginia To Vegas, is a Canadian musician. He is best known for his gold and platinum-certified singles, "We Are Stars", "Lights Out", "Selfish", "Just Friends" and "Betterman", released through Wax Records and Ultra Records.

== Early life and education ==
Although Derik John Baker was born in the Richmond, Virginia, United States, he was raised in Guelph and Toronto, in Ontario, Canada, as well as Charleston in West Virginia, United States.

He attended high school at Guelph Collegiate Vocational Institute and Bishop Macdonell Catholic High School. After high school, Derik attended Sheridan College for studies in travel and tourism.

== Career ==
=== 2013–2014: Career beginnings and Vol. I ===
Virginia To Vegas was signed to an independent full service 100% Canadian music company Wax Records in July 2013, after label executive, Jamie Appleby, discovered him on YouTube. The first single "We Are Stars" was released on January 7, 2014, and entered the Canadian Singles Top 100 chart at 94 on week 5, February 1, 2014, peaked at 14 and stayed for one week. On November 10, 2014, Virginia to Vegas released his debut EP Vol. I, which contains six songs including his Platinum-certified debut single "We Are Stars".

=== 2015–2016: Utopian ===
Virginia to Vegas released a new single, "Our Story", on May 4, 2015. On September 2, 2016, he released a new single, "Lights Out", which samples Rockwell's 1984 single, "Somebody's Watching Me". That fall, he announced that his debut studio album would be released by the end of 2016. Utopian was released on December 2, 2016 and features all four of his singles released through that date. This was when he first got signed to a U.S record company of Ultra Records.

=== 2017–2019: Hartland St. ===
On February 24, 2017, Virginia To Vegas released a new single called "Selfish". On November 8, he released another single called "Emotions". His next single "Yesterday" was released on October 12, 2018. Finally, he released "Just Friends" on May 24, 2019. All these songs are featured on his second EP Hartland St., alongside two other songs, which was released on June 14, 2019. Hartland Street is the name of the actual street he lives on in real life. This was when he moved to, was living in, and was leaving Los Angeles at a time.

=== 2020–2022: A Constant State of Improvement and Don't Wake Me, I'm Dreaming ===
Only months after the release of Hartland St., Virginia To Vegas released the single "Betterman" on February 14, 2020, followed by a five-song EP titled A Constant State of Improvement on February 28, 2020, which includes the song "Betterman". On October 30, 2020, he released another EP on September 18 titled, Don't Wake Me, I'm Dreaming, which includes the lead single "Palm Springs (The Way You Made Me Feel)" along with five other songs. In September 2021, he collaborated with MacKenzie Porter on the single "This Sucks.".

== Discography ==
=== Studio albums ===
Title	Album details
Utopian	Released: December 2, 2016; Label: Wax; Format: CD, digital download
Life Gets Interesting...	Released: February 17, 2023; Label: Wax; Format: CD, digital download; Track listing: 1. "Intro"; 2. "Casamigos"; 3. "Amnesia"; 4. "Outerspace"; 5. "No Excuses"; 6. "Break Up with That Guy."; 7. "Over You"; 8. "R.I.P."; 9. "You Don't Know"; 10. "Drunk"

==== Compilation albums ====
Title	Album details
The Greatest Hits	Released: March 8, 2024; Label: Wax; Format: CD, digital download; Track listing: 1. "We Are Stars" (featuring Alyssa Reid); 2. "Lights Out"; 3. "Selfish"; 4. "Just Friends"; 5. "Betterman"; 6. "No Excusus"; 7. "Don't Fight the Music"; 8. "What Are We"; 9. "Better with You"; 10. "Palm Springs (The Way You Made Me Feel)"; 11. "Malibu" (with NOTD); 12. "Time!"

=== Extended plays ===
Title	EP details
Vol. I	Released: November 10, 2014; Label: Wax; Format: Digital download; Track listing: 1. "Last of the Fighters"; 2. "We Are Stars" (featuring Alyssa Reid); 3. "Make It Last"; 4. "Colourful"; 5. "Don't Fight the Music"; 6. "Beautiful"
Hartland St.	Released: June 14, 2019; Label: Wax; Format: Digital download; Track listing: 1. "Just Friends"; 2. "Internet"; 3. "Selfish"; 4. "Yesterday"; 5. "Emotions"; 6. "Losing Touch"
A Constant State of Improvement	Released: February 28, 2020; Label: Wax; Format: Digital download; Track listing: 1. "Intro"; 2. "What Are We"; 3. "Betterman"; 4. "One on One"; 5. "Better with You"
Don't Wake Me, I'm Dreaming	Released: October 30, 2020; Label: Wax; Format: Digital download; Track listing: 1. "Intro"; 2. "Palm Springs (The Way You Made Me Feel)"; 3. "Flyby." (with Mokita); 4. "Told You So"; 5. "Cry"; 6. "Sunny Days"
It's a Little Complicated, But I'm Okay.	Released: February 4, 2022; Label: Wax; Format: Digital download; Track listing: 1. "Amnesia"; 2. "No Excuses"; 3. "Outerspace"
An Examination of It All	Released: November 7, 2025; Label: Wax; Format: Digital download; Track listing: 1. "Perfume"; 2. "U Up"; 3. "Million Ways"; 4. "Heaven Tonight"; 5. "Arizona Iced Tea"; 6. "Last Night" (with Intense)

==== Compilation extended plays ====
Title	EP details
L.A. in the Rear View	Released: February 14, 2021; Label: Wax, Universal Music Group; Format: Digital download; Track listing: 1. "Just Friends"; 2. "Betterman"; 3. "What Are We"; 4. "Told You So"; 5. "Better with You"; 6. "Sunny Days"
Remember That Time We	Released: May 20, 2022; Label: Wax, FP; Format: Digital download; Track listing: 1. "Malibu" (with NOTD); 2. "Flyby." (with Mokita); 3. "This Sucks." (with MacKenzie Porter); 4. "No Excuses"; 5. "Outerspace"; 6. "Amnesia"

=== Singles ===
==== As lead artist ====
Single	Year	Peak chart positions				Certifications	Album
Single	Year	CAN	CAN AC	CAN CHR	CAN Hot AC	Certifications	Album
"We Are Stars" (featuring Alyssa Reid)	2014	14	13	11	14	MC: Platinum	Utopian
"Don't Fight the Music"	2014	97	30	33	36		Utopian
"Our Story"	2015	—	—	47	32		Utopian
"Lights Out"	2016	40	12	10	14	MC: Platinum	Utopian
"Selfish"	2017	72	11	9	12	MC: Platinum	Hartland St.
"Emotions"	2017	—	—	34	39		Hartland St.
"Yesterday"	2018	—	—	30	—		Hartland St.
"Just Friends"	2019	50	5	8	3	MC: Platinum	Hartland St.
"Betterman"	2020	48	8	15	6	MC: Gold	A Constant State of Improvement
"Palm Springs (The Way You Made Me Feel)"	2020	—	—	27	41		Don't Wake Me, I'm Dreaming
"Malibu" (with NOTD)	2021	—	—	24	29		Remember That Time We
"This Sucks." (with MacKenzie Porter)	2021	—	—	26	42		Remember That Time We
"No Excuses"	2022	61	7	12	11		Life Gets Interesting...
"Daydreaming" (with Noelle)	2022	99	14	20	29		Non-album singles
"Last Christmas" (featuring Tyler Shaw, Lolo, New Friends, Noelle, Shawn Hook)	2023	—	—	—	—		Non-album singles
"Time!"	2024	—	—	10	10		The Greatest Hits
"More Often Than Not"	2024	—	—	—	—		Non-album single
"Heaven Tonight"	2025	—	—	—	—		An Examination of It All
"Arizona Iced Tea"	2025	—	—	—	—		An Examination of It All
"Last Night" (with Intense)	2025	—	—	—	—		An Examination of It All
"Million Ways"	2025	—	—	25	—		An Examination of It All
"—" denotes a recording that did not chart.

==== As featured artist ====
Single	Year	Peak chart positions				Album
Single	Year	CAN	CAN AC	CAN CHR	CAN Hot AC	Album
"Just as Much" (Delaney Jane featuring Virginia to Vegas)	2021	71	15	11	21	Somewhere Else

==== Promotional singles ====
Single	Year	Album
"Colourful"	2014	Vol. I
"Amnesia"	2021	Life Gets Interesting...
"You Don't Know"	2022	Life Gets Interesting...
"Break Up with That Guy."	2022	Life Gets Interesting...

== Awards ==
Virginia to Vegas performed at the 2014 Canadian Radio Music Awards where he was nominated for the Heartseeker Award. His radio success with his first three singles "We Are Stars", "Don't Fight the Music", and "Our Story" contributed to him being nominated for Pop Artist or Group of the Year at the 2015 SiriusXM Indie Awards.

"We Are Stars", "Lights Out" and "Selfish" all earned Virginia to Vegas Socan awards for pop recordings of the year.

In 2015 Virginia to Vegas was awarded at the Canadian Radio Music Awards for the Factor Breakthrough Artist of the Year.

He received a Juno Award nomination for Breakthrough Artist of the Year at the Juno Awards of 2018.
