= About You (MacKenzie Porter song) =

2018 song by MacKenzie Porter

Single by MacKenzie Porter

from the EP Drinkin' Songs: The Collection
- Released: November 30, 2018
- Genre: Country pop
- Length: 2:57
- Label: Big Loud
- Songwriters: Michael Hardy; Sarah Buxton; Corey Crowder; Cameron Montgomery
- Producers: Joey Moi; Dave Cohen; Cameron Montgomery

MacKenzie Porter singles chronology
"Rodeo" (2015)	"About You" (2018)	"These Days" (2019)

Music video
- "About You" on YouTube

"About You" is a song recorded by Canadian country music artist MacKenzie Porter. The track was co-written by Michael Hardy, Sarah Buxton and Corey Crowder, with Cameron Montgomery, who co-produced it with Joey Moi and Dave Cohen. The song became the lead single off Porter's EP Drinkin' Songs: The Collection.

== Critical reception ==
Kerry Doole of FYI Music News stated: "On this track, Porter displays a supple and convincing vocal style, while the lyrical content is subtly subversive". Top Country named the song "Pick of the Week" for April 16, 2019, saying "each listen feels like the first. Every time you hit repeat, there’s another layer of the song to discover. Perhaps it’s the subtle, yet clever, juxtaposition between the production and the story. One moment you’re swaying along and then the next, a heartbreaking lyric stops you in your tracks".

== Commercial performance ==
"About You" reached a peak of #1 on the Billboard Canada Country chart dated May 25, 2019, becoming Porter's first number one. This made Porter the first female artist signed to an independent label to top the Canada Country chart in its 25 years of existence. The song has been certified Gold by Music Canada.

== Music video ==
The official music video for "About You" premiered on ET Canada on March 8, 2019, and was directed by Justin Clough. Porter said: "The video for ‘About You’ came together exactly how I envisioned it — a little edgy and a little dark. Telling the story of love that is so passionate, yet so toxic". The video stars Porter and her real-life partner (and future husband) Jake Etheridge.

== Charts ==
Chart (2019)	Peak position
Canada Country (Billboard)	1

== Certifications ==
Certifications for "About You"
Region	Certification	Certified units/sales
Canada (Music Canada)	Gold	40,000^{‡}
^{‡} Sales+streaming figures based on certification alone.
