= Never Gonna Let You =

2013 single by MacKenzie Porter

Single by MacKenzie Porter

from the album MacKenzie Porter
- Released: June 17, 2013
- Genre: Country
- Length: 4:13
- Label: Thelma Lea
- Songwriter(s): MacKenzie Porter; Brad Crisler; Carolyn Dawn Johnson
- Producer(s): Carolyn Dawn Johnson

MacKenzie Porter singles chronology
"I Wish I'd Known" (2012)	"Never Gonna Let You" (2013)	"If You Ask Me To" (2014)

Music video
- "Never Gonna Let You" on Vimeo

"Never Gonna Let You" is a song co-written and recorded by Canadian country artist MacKenzie Porter. She wrote the track with fellow country artist Carolyn Dawn Johnson and Brad Crisler, while Johnson produced the track. It was Porter's second career single, and was included on her debut self-titled album in 2014.

== Music video ==
The music video for "Never Gonna Let You" premiered on July 5, 2013 on Vimeo. It was directed by David Tenniswood and stars Porter alongside several actors.

== Chart performance ==
"Never Gonna Let You" reached a peak of number 11 on the Billboard Canada Country chart dated September 28, 2013, marking Porter's first career Top 20 hit. It also peaked at number 96 on the Canadian Hot 100 for the same week, becoming her first career entry on her national all-genre chart.

Chart performance for "Never Gonna Let You"
Chart (2013)	Peak position
Canada (Canadian Hot 100)	96
Canada Country (Billboard)	11
