= Lucas Nord =

Swedish musician, DJ, and record producer

- Born: Lucas Hans Göran Nordqvist; 30 June 1992 (age 33); Stockholm, Sweden
- Genres: Electropop; electronic; electro house
- Occupations: Electronic musician; DJ; lyricist; record producer
- Instruments: Drum kit; musical keyboard
- Years active: 2006–present
- Labels: Cosmos Music; Hybris; HK Records; Ministry of Sound; NorthNoir
- Website: cargocollective.com/lucasnord

Lucas Hans Göran Nordqvist (born 30 June 1992), better known by his stage name Lucas Nord, is a Swedish electronic musician, DJ, remixer and record producer. Is known for the single "Run on Love", features vocals by Swedish singer Tove Lo, taken from 2013 debut album Islands, reached number one on Billboard's Dance Club Songs chart the week ending 2 January 2016, giving Nord his first U.S. chart topper and Lo her third consecutive number one on this chart.

== Discography ==
=== Albums ===
- Islands (2013)

=== Extended plays ===
- After You (2015)
- Company (2016)
- Ego (2018)
- Boy Restless (2020)

=== Remixes ===
- Brother Leo — "Hallelujah" (Lucas Nord Remix) (2018)
