= We Are Stars =

Single by Virginia to Vegas featuring Alyssa Reid

from the EP Vol. I and the album Utopian
- Released: January 7, 2014
- Recorded: 2013
- Genre: Indie pop; Pop rock
- Length: 3:52
- Label: Wax, Ultra Records, Universal Music Group
- Songwriters: Jamie Appleby; Derik John Baker; Nathan Ferraro; Kevin Figs; Alyssa Reid
- Producers: Kevin Figs; O.C.

Virginia to Vegas singles chronology
"We Are Stars" (2014)	"Don't Fight the Music" (2014)

Alyssa Reid singles chronology
"Satisfaction Guaranteed" (2013)	"We Are Stars" (2014)	"Hurricane" (2014)

"We Are Stars" is the first single released by the Canadian pop rock singer Virginia to Vegas, featuring the Canadian recording artist Alyssa Reid. The song was written by Derik John Baker (Virginia to Vegas) and Reid with Jamie Appleby, Nathan Ferraro, Kevin Figs and O.C. It was produced by Figs. It was released to digital retailers by Universal Music Group, Wax Records and Ultra Records on 7 January 2014 as the lead single from Virginia to Vegas' debut studio album, Utopian (2016). It was later released to the US on 29 July 2014. The song is also included on Virginia to Vegas' first extended play, Vol. I (2014).

The song was a success in Canada, peaking at number 14 on the Canadian Hot 100 and being certified Gold by Music Canada by March 2014. It has since reached Platinum sales. "We Are Stars" reached the top 15 on several Canadian airplay charts reported by Billboard. On the year-end Hot 100 chart, the song was ranked at 57.

Reid later recorded a solo acoustic version of the song for her third studio album, Phoenix (2015). It served as the first promotional single in November 2015.

== Reception ==
=== Critical ===
Janie Contreras at UMusicians gave the song a positive four-star (out of five) review. She described "We Are Stars" as "exquisitely mixed" and "quite catchy", while drawing particular attention to the anthemic positivism of the lyrics.

Due to its strong reception on contemporary hit radio in its first month, Virgin Radio Toronto dubbed Virginia to Vegas its "Future Star" for the month of January 2014.

=== Commercial ===
"We Are Stars" entered the Billboard Canadian Hot 100 at No. 94 for the week ending 1 February 2014. The song peaked at No. 14 in its 14th chart week, on the chart dated 3 May 2014. It was well received by Top 40, adult contemporary and hot adult contemporary radio in Canada, attaining a top 15 position on the Billboard airplay charts for all three of these formats. By 24 May 2014, "We Are Stars" had peaked at No. 13 on the Canada AC chart, at No. 11 on the Canada CHR/Top 40 chart, and at No. 14 on the Canada Hot AC chart. The song was ranked at number 57 on the Billboard Year-End Canadian Hot 100 chart.

== Music video ==
The official music video for "We Are Stars" was directed by Marc Andre Debrunye and was premiered on 15 March 2014. Black and white concert footage of Virginia to Vegas performing the song and behind-the-scenes shots of him and Reid from their Time Bomb Tour are shown intermittently between neon-lit scenes of the two touring in Las Vegas, Nevada.

== Chart performance ==
=== Weekly charts ===
Chart (2014)	Peak position
Canada (Canadian Hot 100)	14
Canada AC (Billboard)	13
Canada CHR/Top 40 (Billboard)	11
Canada Hot AC (Billboard)	14

=== Year-end charts ===
Chart (2014)	Position
Canada (Canadian Hot 100)	57

=== Certifications ===
Region	Certification
Canada (Music Canada)	Platinum

== Release history ==
Country	Date	Format	Label	Ref.
Canada	January 7, 2014	Digital download	Wax Records, Ultra Records	
United States	July 29, 2014	Digital download	Wax Records, Ultra Records	
