= Dallas Smith discography =

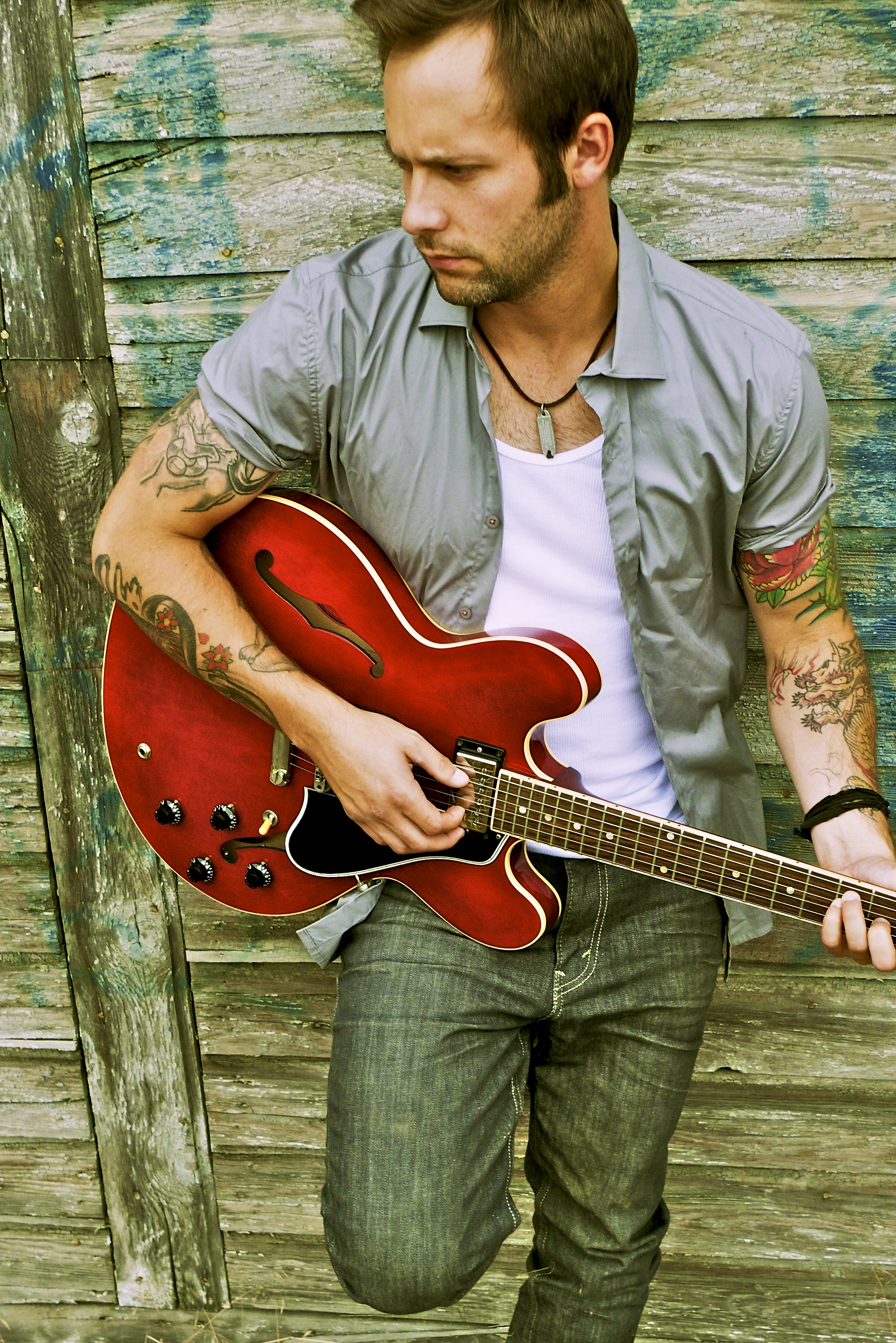
- Studio albums: 5
- EPs: 5
- Singles: 32
- Music videos: 31

Canadian country music singer Dallas Smith's discography consists of five studio albums, five extended plays, twenty-five singles, and twenty-four music videos.

Smith signed with 604 Records in 2011 after previously serving as lead singer of the rock band Default. Since then, he has released four albums: Jumped Right In, Lifted, Side Effects, and Timeless. These albums have produced over twenty collective top-10 singles on Canadian country radio, including a Canadian record eleven number-one hits. In 2021, Smith signed with Big Loud Records, and will release his self-titled fifth studio album Dallas Smith in 2023.

== Studio albums ==
Title	Details	Peak positions	Certifications
Title	Details	CAN	Certifications
Jumped Right In	Release date: May 22, 2012; Label: 604	19	MC: Platinum
Lifted	Release date: November 25, 2014; Label: 604	14	MC: Platinum
Side Effects	Release date: September 2, 2016; Label: 604	7	MC: Gold
Timeless	Release date: August 28, 2020; Label: 604	58	MC: Gold
Dallas Smith	Release date: October 27, 2023; Label: Big Loud	—	

== Extended plays ==
Title	Details	Peak chart positions				Sales
Title	Details	CAN	US Country	US Heat	US Indie	Sales
Tippin' Point	Release date: March 4, 2014; Label: 604, Republic Nashville	19	31	6	—	US: 2,000
Lifted	Release date: November 25, 2014; Label: Big Loud Mountain	—	39	6	47	
Kids with Cars	Release date: September 11, 2015; Label: Blaster Records	—	—	—	—	
Acoustic Sessions Vol. 1	Release date: March 2, 2018; Label: 604	—	—	—	—	
The Fall	Release date: March 15, 2019; Label: 604	91	—	—	—	
"—" denotes releases that did not chart

== Singles ==
=== 2010s ===
Year	Title	Peak chart positions		Certifications	Sales	Album
Year	Title	CAN	CAN Country	Certifications	Sales	Album
2011	"Somebody Somewhere"	79	7	MC: Gold		Jumped Right In
2012	"If It Gets You Where You Wanna Go"	74	6	MC: Gold		Jumped Right In
2012	"Jumped Right In"	69	4	MC: Platinum		Jumped Right In
2013	"What Kinda Love"	77	7			Jumped Right In
2013	"Nothing but Summer"	70	6	MC: Gold		Jumped Right In
2013	"Tippin' Point"	36	5	MC: Platinum	CAN: 100,000	Tippin' Point
2014	"Slow Rollin'"	65	5	MC: Gold		Tippin' Point
2014	"A Girl Like You"	58	6			Tippin' Point
2014	"Wastin' Gas"	41	1	MC: Platinum	US: 6,300	Lifted
2015	"Lifted"	77	5	MC: Platinum		Lifted
2015	"Cheap Seats"	75	5	MC: Platinum		Lifted
2015	"Kids with Cars"	87	6			Side Effects
2016	"One Little Kiss"	93	5	MC: Gold		Side Effects
2016	"Autograph"	95	1	MC: Gold		Side Effects
2017	"Side Effects"	—	1	MC: Platinum		Side Effects
2017	"Sky Stays This Blue"	—	1	MC: Gold		Side Effects
2017	"Sleepin' Around"	—	1			Side Effects
2018	"One Drink Ago" (with Terri Clark)	—	3			Non-album single
2018	"Make 'Em Like You"	—	1			Timeless
2018	"Rhinestone World"	—	1			Timeless
2019	"Drop"	77	1	MC: Platinum		Timeless
2019	"Timeless"	93	1	MC: Gold		Timeless
"—" denotes releases that did not chart

=== 2020s ===
Year	Title	Peak chart positions		Certifications	Album
Year	Title	CAN	CAN Country	Certifications	Album
2020	"Like a Man"	60	1	MC: Platinum	Timeless
2020	"Some Things Never Change" (featuring Hardy)	55	1	MC: Gold	Timeless
2021	"Hide from a Broken Heart"	70	1	MC: Gold	Dallas Smith
2022	"One Too" (with MacKenzie Porter)	90	6	MC: Gold	Dallas Smith
2023	"Singing in a Beer"	—	5		Dallas Smith
2023	"Fixer Upper"	—	1		Dallas Smith
2024	"Use Me"	—	1		Dallas Smith
2024	"CRZY"	—	6		Dallas Smith
2025	"How Do You Miss Me" (featuring Alexandra Kay)	91	4		Non-album single
2026	"Good Time Goes"	58	5		TBA
"—" denotes releases that did not chart

== Other singles ==
=== Christmas singles ===
Year	Title	Peak chart positions	Album
Year	Title	CAN Country	Album
2020	"Classic"	37	Non-album single

==== As featured artist ====
Year	Title	Artist	Peak positions	Album
Year	Title	Artist	CAN Country	Album
2022	"Best of Me"	Josh Ramsay	—	The Josh Ramsay Show
2025	"One Good Life"	Shawn Desman	50	Non-album single
2026	"Leave Me Like a Backroad"	Brock Phillips	58	TBA

== Music videos ==
Year	Title	Director
2011	"Somebody Somewhere"	Stephano Barberis
2012	"If It Gets You Where You Wanna Go"	Stephano Barberis
2012	"Jumped Right In"	Stephano Barberis
2013	"What Kinda Love"	Stephano Barberis
2013	"Nothing but Summer"	Stephano Barberis
2014	"Tippin' Point"	Stephano Barberis
2014	"Slow Rollin'"	Stephano Barberis
2014	"A Girl Like You" (live)	Joel Stewart
2014	"Wastin' Gas"	Nigel Dick
2015	"Lifted"	Nigel Dick
2015	"Cheap Seats"	Stephano Barberis
2015	"Kids with Cars"	Nigel Dick
2016	"One Little Kiss"	Stephano Barberis
2017	"Side Effects"	Stefan Berrill
2017	"Sky Stays This Blue"	Stephano Barberis
2017	"Sleepin' Around"	Unknown
2017	"50/50"	Unknown
2018	"Make 'Em Like You"	Stephano Barberis
2019	"Rhinestone World"	Unknown
2019	"Drop"	Unknown
2020	"Timeless"	Stephano Barberis
2020	"Classic"	Unknown
2021	"Some Things Never Change"	Stephano Barberis
2021	"Hide from a Broken Heart"	Unknown
2022	"Best of Me" (with Josh Ramsay)	Stephano Barberis
2022	"One Too" (with MacKenzie Porter)	Unknown
2022	"Growing Pains" (with Classified)	The Boyd Brothers
2023	"Singing In a Beer"	Caleb Donato
2023	"Fixer Upper"	Justin Clough
2023	"How Do You Miss Me?"	Unknown
2026	"Good Time Goes"	Unknown
