= Kids with Cars =

- Canadian single and US EP cover

Single by Dallas Smith

from the album Side Effects
- Released: September 11, 2015
- Genre: Country rock
- Length: 2:57
- Label: 604; Blaster
- Songwriters: Jesse Frasure; Ryan Hurd; Brad Tursi
- Producer: Joey Moi

Dallas Smith singles chronology
"Cheap Seats" (2015)	"Kids with Cars" (2015)	"One Little Kiss" (2016)

Alternate cover
- US single cover

"Kids with Cars" is a song recorded by Canadian country rock singer Dallas Smith. It was released to digital retailers on September 11, 2015 through 604 Records and Blaster Records as the lead single for his third studio album, Side Effects (2016), and is also included on his American EP of the same name (2015). The song was written by Jesse Frasure, Ryan Hurd, and Brad Tursi and was produced by Joey Moi. "Kids with Cars" is Smith's first single to be serviced to mainstream country radio in the US.

== Background and release ==
After achieving success in Canada with his debut solo album, Jumped Right In (2012), Smith signed with independent American label Big Loud Mountain Records, distributed through Republic Nashville, to expand into the US market and released the song "Tippin' Point" to both countries. He released two extended plays to the US through Big Loud Mountain in 2014 — Tippin' Point and Lifted (an abbreviated version of his Canadian studio album of the same name) — as well as the latter's lead single, "Wastin' Gas". In the summer of 2015, Smith signed a record deal with Blaster Records with plans to release a full-length album in the US.

Smith released the Kids with Cars EP on September 11, 2015, and serviced the title track to country radio on September 14, 2015. It is Smith's first single to impact American mainstream country radio, as previous US releases "Tippin' Point" and "Wastin' Gas" were only played on SiriusXM channel, The Highway, which broadcasts in both Canada and the US. "Kids with Cars" was released simultaneously in Canada.

== Composition ==
"Kids with Cars" is a country rock song written by Jesse Frasure, Ryan Hurd, and Brad Tursi with a duration of two minutes and fifty-seven seconds. Joey Moi produced the song. Its lyrics speak to the freedom of youth and in particular driving around with your friends, and have been described as "anthemic" and "nostalgic".

== Critical reception ==
Matt Bjorke at Roughstock described the song as "likeable" and Smith's "best chance at a hit single yet".

== Commercial reception ==
"Kids with Cars" was the seventh most-added song on American country radio for the week of September 14, 2015 with 11 new stations. In Canada, the song entered the Hot Canadian Digital Songs component chart at number 42, on the chart dated October 3, 2015. It debuted at number 87 on the Canadian Hot 100 chart dated January 16, 2016. "Kids with Cars" became Smith's 12th consecutive top-10 hit on the Canada Country airplay chart in January 2016.

== Music video ==
The music video was directed by Nigel Dick and premiered in November 2015.

== Track listings ==
Digital download – single

1. "Kids with Cars" – 2:57

US digital EP

1. "Kids with Cars" – 2:57
2. "Wastin' Gas" – 3:04
3. "Cheap Seats" – 3:14
4. "Lifted" – 3:22
5. "Thinkin' Bout You" – 2:23

== Chart performance ==
Chart (2015–16)	Peak position
Canada Hot 100 (Billboard)	87
Canada Country (Billboard)	6

== Release history ==
Country	Date	Format	Label(s)	Ref.
Canada	September 11, 2015	Digital download	604	
United States	September 11, 2015	Digital download (EP)	Blaster	
United States	September 14, 2015	Country radio	Blaster	
