= Cheap Seats (song) =

Single by Dallas Smith

from the album Lifted
- Released: June 1, 2015
- Genre: Country; country rock
- Length: 3:13
- Label: 604; Universal Canada; Big Loud Mountain
- Songwriter(s): Sarah Buxton; Jesse Frasure; Tina Parol
- Producer(s): Joey Moi

Dallas Smith singles chronology
"Lifted" (2015)	"Cheap Seats" (2015)	"Kids with Cars" (2015)

"Cheap Seats" is a song written by Sarah Buxton, Jesse Frasure, and Tina Parol, and recorded by Canadian country rock singer Dallas Smith for his second studio album, Lifted (2014). It was first released November 24, 2014 as the iTunes Canada free single of the week. "Cheap Seats" was serviced to Canadian country radio June 1, 2015 via 604 Records and Universal Music Canada as the album's third official single, or sixth including those supporting Tippin' Point (2014).

== Critical reception ==
"Cheap Seats" received mixed reviews from music critics. Independent music blog Soundcheck Entertainment was complimentary, with contributor Corey Kelly describing the song as "amazing" and a "summer time [sic] jam." However, Desiree Pharias of The State Press found the song's themes to be clichéd and overdone.

== Commercial performance ==
"Cheap Seats" was the second most-downloaded song in Canada for the week of June 8, 2015, according to DMDS. It entered the Billboard Canada Country airplay chart at number forty for the chart dated June 27, 2015 as the most-added song and highest debut position of the week. The song reached the top 10 on the Canada Country chart dated August 15, 2015—Smith's record-extending 11th consecutive single to reach that tier. "Cheap Seats" also debuted on the Billboard Canadian Hot 100 at number 79 on the chart dated August 1, 2015. It has been certified Platinum by Music Canada.

== Music video ==
The music video for "Cheap Seats" was directed by Stephano Barberis—who had previously directed Smith's first seven music videos—and premiered June 30, 2015.

== Charts ==
Chart (2015)	Peak position
Canada (Canadian Hot 100)	75
Canada Country (Billboard)	5

== Certifications ==
Region	Certification	Certified units/sales
Canada (Music Canada)	Platinum	80,000^{‡}
^{‡} Sales+streaming figures based on certification alone.

== Release history ==
Country	Date	Format	Label	Ref.
Canada	November 24, 2014	Digital download	604 Records	
United Kingdom	November 24, 2014	Digital download	Big Loud Mountain Records	
United States	November 24, 2014	Digital download	Big Loud Mountain Records	
Canada	June 1, 2015	Country radio	604 Records / Universal Music Canada	
