= Dallas Smith (disambiguation) =

Dallas Smith (born 1977) is a Canadian singer and songwriter.

Dallas Smith may also refer to:

- Dallas Smith discography, a catalogue of published sound recordings by Dallas Smith
  - Dallas Smith (album), 2023 studio album by Dallas Smith
- Dallas Smith (ice hockey) (born 1941), Canadian ice hockey player

== See also ==
- Dallis Smith (born 1965), American football player
