= Sky Stays This Blue =

Single by Dallas Smith

from the album Side Effects
- Released: May 16, 2017
- Genre: Country
- Length: 2:52
- Label: 604
- Songwriter(s): Ross Copperman; Ashley Gorley; Josh Osborne
- Producer(s): Joey Moi

Dallas Smith singles chronology
"Side Effects" (2017)	"Sky Stays This Blue" (2017)	"Sleepin' Around" (2017)

"Sky Stays This Blue" is a song written by Ross Copperman, Ashley Gorley, and Josh Osborne and recorded by Canadian country singer Dallas Smith for his third studio album, Side Effects (2016). It was released to Canadian country radio May 16, 2017 through 604 Records as the album's fifth single. An accompanying video featuring Smith's daughter premiered on Father's Day 2017.

== Commercial performance ==
"Sky Stays This Blue" debuted at number 41 on the Canada Country chart dated June 3, 2017. It earned Smith his record-extending sixteenth consecutive top ten single in its sixth week. The song has since peaked at number one on the chart dated August 26, 2017. This ascension made Smith the first Canadian male artist to earn four number one country singles, the first Canadian male artist to generate three number one country singles from one album (following "Autograph" and "Side Effects"), and the first Canadian country artist to post three consecutive number one country singles.

== Music video ==
The music video for "Sky Stays This Blue" was directed by Stephano Barberis and stars Smith's three-year-old daughter Vayda. It was released June 18, 2017 as a Father's Day dedication to his children. Smith chose Barberis to direct the video as, in addition to having collaborated on nine of his previous videos, Barberis is Vayda's godfather. The video was promoted the week before its release via Smith's social media.

== Charts ==
Chart (2017)	Peak position
Canada Country (Billboard)	1

=== Year-end charts ===
Chart (2017)	Position
Canada Country (Billboard)	20

== Certifications ==
Region	Certification	Certified units/sales
Canada (Music Canada)	Gold	40,000^{‡}
^{‡} Sales+streaming figures based on certification alone.
