= Radiomonitor =

Airplay monitoring service

Radiomonitor is a British music company that tracks the worldwide airplay of songs, with the information given to record labels and radio stations. They have established partnerships with several international companies located in Ireland, Australia and South Africa, and compiled several airplay charts in the United Kingdom in contrast to the Official Charts Company's physical sales-based UK Singles Chart.

== Background ==
Radiomonitor tracks the airplay data of songs played on different multimedia platforms in over 120 countries, which is subsequently accessed by record labels and news publications through their official app, e-mail, or a data stream. The company compiles several weekly radio airplay charts such as the UK Airplay Chart and Italy's Airplay Italia. Radiomonitor has established several charts in the United Kingdom for over a decade, including the Radiomonitor Top 100, the annual Radiomonitor Marketshare, and the Radiomonitor end-of-year Top 100. The data included on the Radiomonitor charts contain several disparities to the Official Charts Company, as the former tracks the biggest airplay songs.

On 30 August 2016, Radiomonitor established a partnership with Canadian software company Yangaroo to provide two separate airplay charts for Ireland; Breaking Irish Chart and Current Irish Music Chart. The former was created to find upcoming performers, while the latter provided a platform for experienced Irish talents. It sponsored the Music Week Awards on 9 May 2019, which was held at Battersea Evolution by British music magazine Music Week. The company expanded to Australia in 2017 after opening 16 offices worldwide, where they partnered with Australian music magazine The Music Network on 6 October 2019 to provide assistance for their charts, which would streamline and accurately improve their data. Similarly, Radiomonitor announced the South African Radiomonitor Airplay Chart on 9 October 2019 after branching out to the country in 2015, where it published data from 170 radio stations and 24 television stations.

On 21 May 2021, Radiomonitor further developed its partnership with The Music Network (TMN) and Countrytown in Australia to publish the weekly Radiomonitor Hot 100 Chart and the Countrytown Hot 50 Chart, the latter of which features country music singles. Both of these charts are compiled using Australian-based data from Radiomonitor.

On 8 March 2024, it was announced that the UK Country Airplay chart would be launching a few days later. The chart, which is the first genre-specific radio chart in the UK, aims to serve as a key measure of which country songs are being enjoyed most frequently by listeners across the UK and is produced in collaboration with Radiomonitor and the UK branch of the Country Music Association.
