= Wastin' Gas =

2014 single by Dallas Smith

Single by Dallas Smith

from the album Lifted
- Released: October 28, 2014
- Genre: Country
- Length: 3:03
- Label: 604; Big Loud Mountain
- Songwriters: Adam Craig; Matt Dragstrem; Jon Nite; Josh Wireman
- Producer: Joey Moi

Dallas Smith singles chronology
"A Girl Like You" (2014)	"Wastin' Gas" (2014)	"Lifted" (2015)

"Wastin' Gas" is a song recorded by Canadian country rock artist Dallas Smith for his second studio album, Lifted (2014). It was released October 28, 2014 through 604 Records (in Canada) and Big Loud Mountain Records (in the US) as the lead single from the album, and fourth overall after the three released in support of Tippin' Point (2014). The song entered the Canadian Hot 100 at number 41 in November 2014, Smith's second highest peak. On the chart issued January 22, 2015, "Wastin' Gas" rose to No. 1 on the Canada Country airplay chart, becoming Smith's first chart topper.

== Critical reception ==
Markos Papadatos of Digital Journal rated the song 4.5/5 stars and praised the song's "energy" and Smith's "charisma", writing "'Wastin' Gas' is one of those songs that one wants to listen to while rolling their windows down and cruising on the highway [...] His vocals are refreshing and the song has clever and fun lyrics." Mike Bell of The Calgary Herald was more critical of the song in his review of Lifted, describing it as "yet another entry in the drivin' with my best girl genre" and noting that it is "fairly catchy, relatively inoffensive, [and] remarkably familiar, but with zero risks taken." In a complimentary review of Lifted, Shenieka Russell-Metcalf of Canadian country music blog Top Country praised "Wastin' Gas" as a "fun and catchy song that is sure to make you want to turn it up loud." Robert K. Oermann of MusicRow magazine gave the song a glowing review. "The churning production is terrifically exciting," writes Oermann, "Luckily, [Smith's] got the vocal chops to keep up with it, and the driving song has hooks aplenty."

== Commercial performance ==
In Canada, "Wastin' Gas" debuted and peaked at number forty-one on the Billboard Canadian Hot 100 on the chart issued November 15, 2014. It instantly became Smith's second highest-peaking single on that chart, behind only "Tippin' Point", which reached number thirty-six. On the Canada Country airplay chart, the song debuted at number forty-three on the chart issued November 15, 2014 before vaulting to number twenty-three in its second week. It reached the top 10 on the chart issued December 13, 2014 — becoming his ninth consecutive top 10 hit — and has since topped the chart. The song was certified Platinum by Music Canada in April 2018.

In the United States, "Wastin' Gas" sold 6,300 units in its first week and debuted at number forty on the Billboard Country Digital Songs chart (the digital sales component of Hot Country Songs), marking his first entry on a singles chart in the US.

== Live performances ==
Smith performed "Wastin' Gas" and "Tippin' Point" during the pre-game show for the 102nd Grey Cup on November 30, 2014.

== Music video ==
A lyric video for "Wastin' Gas" premiered on Smith's Vevo channel the day after the song's release on October 29, 2014. The official music video was filmed in Tennessee under the direction of Nigel Dick and premiered November 24, 2014.

== Charts ==
Chart (2014–15)	Peak position
Canada (Canadian Hot 100)	41
Canada Country (Billboard)	1
US Country Digital Songs (Billboard)	40
US Country Indicator (Billboard)	51

== Certifications ==
Region	Certification	Certified units/sales
Canada (Music Canada)	Platinum	80,000^{‡}
^{‡} Sales+streaming figures based on certification alone.
