= Slow Rollin' =

Single by Dallas Smith

from the album Tippin' Point
- Released: March 19, 2014
- Genre: Country rock
- Length: 3:17
- Label: 604; Republic Nashville
- Songwriter(s): Rodney Clawson; Luke Laird
- Producer(s): Joey Moi

Dallas Smith singles chronology
"Tippin' Point" (2013)	"Slow Rollin'" (2014)	"A Girl Like You" (2014)

"Slow Rollin'" is a song written by Rodney Clawson and Luke Laird, and recorded by Canadian country rock singer Dallas Smith for his first EP, Tippin' Point (2014). It is also included on his second studio album, Lifted (2014). It was serviced to Canadian country radio via 604 Records on March 19, 2014 as the EP's second single. "Slow Rollin'" entered the Billboard Canadian Hot 100 at number 98.

American country music group Lady Antebellum recorded a version of "Slow Rollin'" for the deluxe edition of their sixth studio album, 747 (2014).

== Critical reception ==
Markus Meyer of country music blog The Shotgun Seat praised the song for being enjoyable despite its lack of depth. "Is “Slow Rollin'” a masterpiece?" writes Meyer, "No, it really isn’t. But it is a very enjoyable summer song that makes you want to sing along with it... The guitar driven production is surprisingly restrained which is pleasant and Smith sounds fully invested."

== Music video ==
The video for "Slow Rollin'" was directed by Stephano Barberis, who also worked on Smith's previous six music videos, and premiered June 3, 2014 on CMT. It debuted at number 6 on the CMT Chevrolet Countdown ranking the most popular country music videos, marking his highest debut on the list.

== Chart performance ==
"Slow Rollin'" debuted at number 98 on the Billboard Canadian Hot 100 for the week ending April 12, 2014.

Chart (2014)	Peak position
Canada (Canadian Hot 100)	65
Canada Country (Billboard)	5

== Certifications ==
Region	Certification	Certified units/sales
Canada (Music Canada)	Gold	40,000^{‡}
^{‡} Sales+streaming figures based on certification alone.
