= If It Gets You Where You Wanna Go =

Single by Dallas Smith

from the album Jumped Right In
- Released: March 12, 2012
- Genre: Country rock
- Length: 3:36
- Label: 604
- Songwriters: Rodney Atkins; Rodney Clawson; Jim Collins
- Producer: Joey Moi

Dallas Smith singles chronology
"Somebody Somewhere" (2011)	"If It Gets You Where You Wanna Go" (2012)	"Jumped Right In" (2012)

"If It Gets You Where You Wanna Go" is a song recorded by Canadian country rock artist Dallas Smith. It was released in March 2012 as the second single from his debut solo album, Jumped Right In. It peaked at number 74 on the Canadian Hot 100 in June 2012.

"If It Gets You Where You Wanna Go" was previously recorded by Steve Holy on his 2011 album Love Don't Run.

== Critical reception ==
Jeff DeDekker of the Leader-Post called the song "a perfect anthem for summer." He wrote that "fuelled by a fierce banjo, the song is fast and fun with a simple message — follow your heart."

== Music video ==
The music video was directed by Stephano Barberis and premiered in April 2012.

== Chart performance ==
"If It Gets You Where You Wanna Go" debuted at number 90 on the Canadian Hot 100 for the week of May 26, 2012.

Chart (2012)	Peak position
Canada Hot 100 (Billboard)	74
Canada Country (Billboard)	6

== Certifications ==
Region	Certification	Certified units/sales
Canada (Music Canada)	Gold	40,000^{‡}
^{‡} Sales+streaming figures based on certification alone.
