= Autograph (song) =

Single by Dallas Smith

from the album Side Effects
- Released: August 19, 2016
- Genre: Country pop
- Length: 2:55
- Label: 604
- Songwriter(s): Nicolle Galyon; Ross Copperman; Haley Georgia
- Producer(s): Joey Moi

Dallas Smith singles chronology
"One Little Kiss" (2016)	"Autograph" (2016)	"Side Effects" (2017)

"Autograph" is a song recorded by Canadian country rock singer Dallas Smith for his third solo studio album, Side Effects (2016). It was written by Nicolle Galyon, Ross Copperman, and Haley Georgia. The song was released to digital retailers on August 19, 2016, through 604 Records as the album's third official single.

== Background ==
Smith intended to record the song on his previous album, Lifted (2014), but it was on hold for Keith Urban, who was at the time recording for his 2013 album, Fuse. When the song did not make the final cut of the album, it was offered to Smith again. He "quickly" recorded the song for inclusion on a future project that became Side Effects.

== Commercial performance ==
"Autograph" was the most-downloaded song for the chart week of August 29, 2016, according to DMDS. It entered the Billboard Canada Country chart dated September 17, 2016 at number 34 and is Smith's record-extending fourteenth consecutive top-10 single, encompassing his entire singles discography. The song reached number one on the chart dated November 26, 2016, becoming Smith's second chart-topper. "Autograph" entered the Canadian Hot 100 at number 97 on the chart dated November 19, 2016. It later reached a peak position of 95.

== Charts ==
Chart (2016)	Peak position
Canada (Canadian Hot 100)	95
Canada Country (Billboard)	1

== Certifications ==
Region	Certification	Certified units/sales
Canada (Music Canada)	Gold	40,000^{‡}
^{‡} Sales+streaming figures based on certification alone.

== Release history ==
Country	Date	Format	Label	Ref.
Various	August 19, 2016	Digital download	604 Records	
Canada	August 24, 2016	Country radio	604 Records	
Canada	February 20, 2017	Digital download – Pop version	604 Records	
