= Travis Meadows =

American country singer and songwriter

- Born: May 23, 1965 (age 60)
- Genres: Country
- Occupations: Singer; songwriter
- Years active: 2007–present
- Website: travismeadows.com

Travis Meadows (born 1965) is an American country music singer and songwriter. He has released four albums and written a number of songs for other country artists.

== Early life ==
Meadows was born in 1965 in Mississippi, growing up in Jackson. He began using drugs at an early age, and at 14 was diagnosed with bone cancer, which led to the loss of most of his right leg.

== Career ==
At the age of 16, he began playing in local bands, starting his musical career as a drummer before beginning to play the harmonica and guitar by the time he was 21. During his early 20s, he performed with blues musicians such as Sam Myers, and moved to Gatlinburg, where he began writing songs. In his mid-20s, Meadows became a Christian missionary and later a preacher, traveling around the United States and overseas, as well as writing and performing Christian music. By his late 30s, however, he had become disenchanted with the church, and moved to Nashville to pursue a songwriting career. He signed a contract with Universal Music Publishing, releasing his debut album My life 101 I'm 2007, but at the same time his life-long drinking and drug habits led to a multi-year descent into alcoholism and abuse. After four trips to rehab, he succeeded in regaining sobriety in 2010.

In 2011, Meadows released a studio album, titled Killin' Uncle Buzzy, written in 2010 while he was recovering from his alcohol addiction during his fourth period in rehab. According to Meadows, a counselor had suggested keeping a journal, which led to him writing songs instead. In 2013, after his songwriting contract with Universal expired, he began writing independently before signing with independent record label Kobalt Music and releasing a third album, Old Ghosts & Unfinished Business.

In 2016, Meadows was featured in an episode of the television show American Elements.

In 2017, Meadows released his fourth album, First Cigarette. The album was produced by Jeremy Spillman and assisted by Jay Joyce, and is the first album by Meadows to receive label support. It is also his first album to appear on Billboard charts, reaching No. 21 on Heatseekers Albums and No. 48 on Independent Albums. It sold 1,100 copies in its debut week, reaching No. 17 on Americana/Folk Album Sales and No. 34 on Country Album Sales.

In April 2021, Earache Records reissued Killin' Uncle Buzzy for the record's 10th Anniversary, including a limited edition clear vinyl. This was the first time the album had been available on vinyl and released by a label.

== Discography ==
=== Albums/EPs ===
Title	Album details	Peak chart positions		Sales
Title	Album details	US Heat	US Indie	Sales
My Life 101	Release date: February 6, 2007; Label: Travis Meadows	—	—	
Killing Uncle Buzzy	Release date: July 19, 2011; Label: Travis Meadows; Reissued: April 30, 2021; Label: Earache Records	—	—	
Old Ghosts & Unfinished Business (EP)	Release date: May 7, 2013; Label: Travis Meadows	—	—	
First Cigarette	Release date: October 13, 2017; Label: Blaster Records	21	48	US: 1,100
"—" denotes releases that did not chart

=== Songs recorded by other artists ===
In addition to his solo work, Meadows has written songs for other country musicians.

Artist	Song	Album	Year
Dallas Smith	CRZY	Dallas Smith	2023
Cody Johnson	Human	Human: The Double Album	2021
Kenny Chesney	Better Boat	Songs for the Saints	2018
Blackberry Smoke	Medicate My Mind	Find A Light	2018
Blackberry Smoke	Seems So Far	Find A Light	2018
Brothers Osborne	While You Still Can	Port Saint Joe	2018
Lindsay Ell	Worth the Wait	The Project	2017
Randy Houser	Hot Beer and Cold Women	Fired Up	2016
Wynonna Judd	Things That I Lean On	Wynonna Judd & The Big Noise*	2016
Hank Williams Jr.	God And Guns	It's About Time	2016
Eric Church	Knives Of New Orleans	Mr. Misunderstood	2015
Levi Lowrey	My Crazy Head	My Crazy Head	2015
Dierks Bentley	Riser	Riser	2014
Levi Lowrey	Long Way Home	Levi Lowrey	2014
Frankie Ballard	Don't You Wanna Fail	Sunshine & Whiskey	2014
Eric Church	Dark Side	The Outsiders	2014
Jake Owen	What We Ain't Got	Days Of Gold	2013
Robby Armstrong	Better Me	Robby Armstrong	2013
Jimmie Van Zant	Chasing Shadows	Feels Like Freedom	2012
High Valley	Trying To Believe	Love Is a Long Road	2012
Blackberry Smoke	Pretty Little Lie	The Whippoorwill*	2012
Adam Brand	It's Gonna Be OK	It's Gonna Be OK*	2010
Flynnville Train	Friend Of Sinners	Redemption	2010
Jake Owen	Cherry On Top	Easy Does It	2009
Lynyrd Skynyrd	Gods & Guns	Gods & Guns	2009
Mary Gauthier	I Ain't Leaving	Between Daylight & Dark	2007
