= Dallas Smith (album) =

2023 studio album by Dallas Smith

Studio album by Dallas Smith
- Released: October 27, 2023
- Studio: Blackbird (Nashville); Starstruck (Nashville)
- Genre: Country; country rock; alternative rock
- Length: 38:16
- Label: Big Loud
- Producer: Joey Moi

Dallas Smith chronology
Timeless (2020)	Dallas Smith (2023)

Singles from Dallas Smith
- 1. "Hide from a Broken Heart" Released: November 29, 2021; 2. "One Too" Released: May 27, 2022; 3. "Singing in a Beer" Released: January 27, 2023; 4. "Fixer Upper" Released: September 29, 2023; 5. "Use Me" Released: April 1, 2024; 6. "CRZY" Released: November 18, 2024

Dallas Smith is the fifth studio album by Canadian country music artist Dallas Smith. It was released on October 27, 2023, via Big Loud Records, and marks his first full-length release after signing a global deal with the label in 2021. The album was produced by Smith's longtime collaborator Joey Moi and includes the singles "Hide from a Broken Heart", "One Too", "Singing in a Beer", "Fixer Upper", "Use Me", and "CRZY".

== Background and promotion ==
Smith remarked that he was "pumped" for the album to be put, and that he had not "been this excited to release a big chunk of music in a long time", adding that he "felt confident people would fall in love with" his debut Canadian country album in 2012, and that he had similar feelings with this release. He released two instant gratification tracks "Fixer Upper" and "CRZY" along with the official opening of album pre-orders and the unveiling of the track list. Smith stated that the songs are "authentic" to his story, which described the album as a whole. He stated that "Use Me" was one of his favourite tracks on the album, and that he had to convince the label that the song needed to be recorded. As his first full-length album to be released by a United States-based label, Smith stated "I just thought it would be a great time to re-introduce myself as an artist, and I think a really good way to make that statement was to self-title the record".

Smith participated in a "TalkShopLive" session with his fans on October 11, 2023, to discuss the making of the album and sell a limited amount of signed CDs. On November 18, Smith performed live at the "Winter Break Up Festival" in Abbotsford, British Columbia, which is also slated to be an official album release event.

== Critical reception ==
An uncredited review from Front Porch Music stated that from "heartfelt ballads to foot-tapping anthems," the album is a "testament to [Smith's] evolution as a musician". Steven Boero of Music Row stated that Smith and Moi had created "an energetic sound that layers Smith's lean, edgy vocals along with the calming confidence that comes with time".

== Track listing ==
Dallas Smith track listing
No.	Title	Writer(s)	Length
1.	"Use Me"	John Byron; Jared Hampton; Tate Howell	3:46
2.	"How Do You Miss Me"	Ashley Gorley; Michael Hardy; Mark Holman	3:02
3.	"Fixer Upper"	Matt Dragstrem; Brett Tyler; Morgan Wallen	3:07
4.	"Singing in a Beer"	Rocky Block; Casey Brown; Parker Welling	2:52
5.	"One Too" (featuring MacKenzie Porter)	Block; Tom Jordan; Mitch Thompson; Alysa Vanderhym	3:21
6.	"I Would"	Hardy; Holman; Hillary Lindsey	3:28
7.	"Bring It On"	Holman; Rodney Clawson; Ernest Keith Smith	3:09
8.	"Good Time Getting There"	Jake Owen; Jimmy Robbins; Laura Veltz	3:05
9.	"CRZY"	Jaren Johnston; Travis Meadows; Stephen Wilson Jr.	3:39
10.	"Day After Day" (featuring Shawn Austin)	Byron; Preston Brust; Chris Lucas; Blake Pendergrass	2:33
11.	"Hide from a Broken Heart"	Holman; Smith; Lauren LaRue; Geoff Warburton	3:28
12.	"Home Is Where the Bar Is"	Holman; Smith; Jared Mullins; Cole Swindell	2:46
Total length:			38:16

== Personnel ==
Credits adapted from the album's liner notes.

- Dallas Smith – lead vocals
- Joey Moi – production, mixing, programming
- Tom Jordan – co-production on "One Too"
- Jacob Durrett – co-production on "Fixer Upper"
- Josh Ditty – recording, editing
- Ryan Yount – recording assistance, editing
- Sean Badum – recording assistance
- Ally Gecewicz – production coordination
- Scott Cooke – editing
- Eivind Nordland – editing, spatial audio mixing
- Ted Jensen – mastering
- Jerry Roe – drums, shaker, tambourine, percussion
- Jimmie Lee Sloas – bass
- Derek Wells – electric guitar
- Matt Dragstrem – electric guitar
- Ilya Toshinskiy – acoustic guitar, banjo, mandolin, resonator guitar
- Dave Cohen – keyboards
- Alex Wright – keyboards, Hammond B3 organ
- Wes Hightower – background vocals
- Tori Johnson – art direction
- Jessica Hood – photography
- Annette Kirk – graphic design

== Charts ==
=== Singles ===
Chart performance for singles from Dallas Smith
Year	Single	Peak chart positions		Certifications
Year	Single	CAN Country	CAN	Certifications
2021	"Hide from a Broken Heart"	1	70	MC: Gold
2022	"One Too" (with MacKenzie Porter)	6	90	MC: Gold
2023	"Singing in a Beer"	5	—	
2023	"Fixer Upper"	4	—	
2024	"Use Me"	2	—	
2024	"CRZY"	6	—	
"—" denotes releases that did not chart

== Awards and nominations ==
Year	Association	Category	Nominated work	Result	Ref.
2023	Canadian Country Music Association	Musical Collaboration of the Year	"One Too"	Won	
2023	Canadian Country Music Association	Video of the Year	"One Too"	Nominated	
2024	Canadian Country Music Association	Album of the Year	Dallas Smith	Nominated	
2024	Canadian Country Music Association	Musical Collaboration of the Year	"Day After Day"	Nominated	
2024	Canadian Country Music Association	Record Producer of the Year	Joey Moi (Dallas Smith)	Won	
2025	Juno Awards	Country Album of the Year	Dallas Smith	Nominated	
