= Somebody Somewhere (Dallas Smith song) =

Single by Dallas Smith

from the album Jumped Right In
- Released: November 7, 2011
- Genre: Country rock
- Length: 3:30
- Label: 604
- Songwriter(s): Rodney Clawson; Jay Spencer; Dustin Lynch
- Producer(s): Joey Moi

Dallas Smith singles chronology
"Somebody Somewhere" (2011)	"If It Gets You Where You Wanna Go" (2012)

"Somebody Somewhere" is the debut single by Canadian country rock artist Dallas Smith. It was released in November 2011 as the first single from his debut solo album, Jumped Right In. It peaked at number 79 on the Canadian Hot 100 in February 2012.

"Somebody Somewhere" was nominated for Single of the Year at the 2012 Canadian Country Music Association Awards.

== Critical reception ==
Jeff DeDekker of the Leader-Post wrote that "the tune somehow manages to remain upbeat while Smith sings of what should have been."

== Music video ==
The music video was directed by Stephano Barberis and premiered in December 2011. It won the 2012 British Columbia Country Music Association award for Video of the Year.

== Chart performance ==
"Somebody Somewhere" debuted at number 84 on the Canadian Hot 100 for the week of February 4, 2012.

Chart (2012)	Peak position
Canada (Canadian Hot 100)	79
Canada Country (Billboard)	7

== Certifications ==
Region	Certification	Certified units/sales
Canada (Music Canada)	Gold	40,000^{‡}
^{‡} Sales+streaming figures based on certification alone.
