= What Kinda Love =

Single by Dallas Smith

from the album Jumped Right In
- Released: January 7, 2013
- Genre: Country rock
- Length: 3:33
- Label: 604
- Songwriter(s): Dallas Smith; Joey Moi; Zac Maloy
- Producer(s): Joey Moi

Dallas Smith singles chronology
"Jumped Right In" (2012)	"What Kinda Love" (2013)	"Nothing but Summer" (2013)

"What Kinda Love" is a song recorded and co-written by Canadian country rock artist Dallas Smith. It was released in January 2013 as the fourth single from his debut solo album, Jumped Right In. It peaked at number 77 on the Canadian Hot 100 in April 2013.

== Critical reception ==
Casadie Pederson of Top Country called the song "perhaps his best release yet." She wrote that "it can relate to so many people as we go along this journey of life and love so many things, all of which mean different things to us."

== Music video ==
The music video was directed by Stephano Barberis and premiered in February 2013.

== Chart performance ==
"What Kinda Love" debuted at number 95 on the Canadian Hot 100 for the week of February 23, 2013.

Chart (2013)	Peak position
Canada (Canadian Hot 100)	77
Canada Country (Billboard)	7
