= Alexandra Kay =

American singer-songwriter

- Born: September 5, 1991 (age 35); Waterloo, Illinois, U.S.
- Genre: Country
- Occupation: Singer-songwriter
- Instruments: Vocals; guitar
- Years active: 2014–present
- Website: www.alexandrakayofficial.com

Alexandra Kay (born September 5, 1991) is an American country music singer-songwriter from Waterloo, Illinois signed to Wheelhouse Records.

== Background ==
Kay began her career independently at the age of 22, eventually developing a strong online following from posting covers of 90s country songs on social media platforms such as Facebook, Instagram, YouTube, and TikTok. The early days of her career included voiceover work, commercials, and musical theatre.

Kay made her Grand Ole Opry debut on November 19, 2022.

Kay self-released her debut studio album, All I've Ever Known, on October 26, 2023. Topically, the album's songs heavily focused on the singer's personal life in the wake of her divorce.

In February 2025, it was announced that Kay had signed a record deal with Wheelhouse Records. In March 2025, she collaborated with Dallas Smith on the single "How Do You Miss Me". Her second studio album, Second Wind, was released through Wheelhouse on October 24, 2025. "Straight for the Heart" was released as Kay's debut single to country radio on November 10, 2025, and served as the album's lead single. It reached the top 40 of the Billboard Country Airplay charts.

== Personal life ==
Kay married longtime boyfriend Indiana Touchette on September 25, 2021, but the couple divorced.

Since 2024, she has been in a relationship with David Cornejo, a resident from Jurupa Valley.

== Discography ==
=== Studio albums ===
List of EPs, with selected details, chart positions and sales
Title	Album details	Peak chart positions
Title	Album details	US Country
All I've Ever Known	Release date: October 26, 2023; Label: Independent; Format: Digital download	—
Second Wind	Release date: October 24, 2025; Label: Wheelhouse; Format: Digital download	36

=== Singles ===
List of singles, with selected chart positions
Title	Year	Peak chart positions	Album
Title	Year	US Country Airplay	Album
"Straight for the Heart"	2025	33	Second Wind

=== Featured singles ===
List of singles, with selected chart positions
Title	Year	Peak chart positions		Album
Title	Year	CAN	CAN Country	Album
"How Do You Miss Me" (Dallas Smith featuring Alexandra Kay)	2025	91	4	Non-album single

=== Other album appearances ===
List of other album appearances, showing year released, other artists, and album name
Title	Year	Other artist(s)	Album	Ref.
"Leave the Light On"	2024	Jelly Roll	Twisters: The Album	

== Filmography ==
Film and television appearances by Sara Evans
Title	Year	Role	Notes	Ref.
Westside	2018	Herself	8 episodes	
