= Lifted (Dallas Smith album) =

Studio album by Dallas Smith
- Released: November 25, 2014
- Genres: Country; country rock
- Length: 35:36 (album); 21:37 (EP)
- Labels: 604; Big Loud Mountain; Universal Canada
- Producer: Joey Moi

Dallas Smith chronology
Tippin' Point (2014)	Lifted (2014)	Side Effects (2016)

Singles from Lifted
- 1. "Tippin' Point" Released: October 8, 2013; 2. "Slow Rollin'" Released: March 19, 2014; 3. "A Girl Like You" Released: June 23, 2014; 4. "Wastin' Gas" Released: October 28, 2014; 5. "Lifted" Released: February 17, 2015; 6. "Cheap Seats" Released: June 1, 2015

Professional ratings
Review scores
Source	Rating
aNewRisingMusic	5/5 stars

Lifted is the second solo album by Canadian country music artist Dallas Smith. It was released in Canada on November 25, 2014 via 604 Records. The album was available for pre-order on iTunes after the release of the single "Wastin' Gas," which was released on October 28, 2014. In the United States, Lifted was instead released via Big Loud Mountain Records as a six-song EP containing only the material not released on previous EP, Tippin' Point, except for a live recording of the title track.

== Background ==
In the fall of 2013, Smith signed to American label Republic Nashville and opened for country music duo Florida Georgia Line (also on Republic Nashville) on their "Here's to the Good Times" Tour. The country duo helped write the album's lead single "Tippin' Point," which would later be certified gold by Music Canada.

Several songs from the album are featured on Smith's extended play Tippin' Point, Smith's first solo country work released in the US. The extended play sold 2,000 copies in its first week of release in the US.

== Singles ==
The album's first single "Tippin' Point" was released on October 8, 2013, which would later sell 100,000 digital copies in Canada. The album's second and third singles — "Slow Rollin'" and "A Girl Like You" — were later released in mid-2014 to moderate success on the Canadian Hot 100.

The fourth single — "Wastin' Gas" — was released on October 28, 2014. It debuted at number 41 on the Canadian Hot 100, and sold 6,300 copies in its first week of release in the US. The single has received positive reviews, with Markos Papadatos of Digital Journal giving the song a 4.5 out of 5. It became Smith's first Canada Country leader in January 2015. "Lifted" and "Cheap Seats" were also released as singles in February and June 2015, respectively.

=== Other songs ===
"Cheap Seats" was released as the iTunes (Canada) free single of the week in promotion of the album for the week of November 25 to December 1, 2014. It was later serviced to radio as the sixth official single off the album.

== Track listing ==
Canada (CD)
No.	Title	Writer(s)	Length
1.	"Wastin' Gas"	Adam Craig; Matt Dragstrem; Jon Nite	3:03
2.	"Tippin' Point"	Brian Kelley; Tyler Hubbard; Jaren Johnston	2:58
3.	"Cheap Seats"	Sarah Buxton; Jesse Frasure; Tina Parol	3:13
4.	"Lifted"	Jeremy Stover; Johnston; Zac Maloy	3:21
5.	"Heat Rises"	Rodney Clawson; Johnston; Ross Copperman	4:00
6.	"Thinkin' 'Bout You"	Rhett Akins; Ashley Gorley; Jimmy Robbins	2:21
7.	"Slow Rollin'"	Clawson; Luke Laird	3:17
8.	"Just Say When"	Clawson; Copperman; Ben Hayslip	3:18
9.	"A Girl Like You"	Jonhston; Robbins	3:14
10.	"Wrong About That"	Clawson; Jon Randall; Jessi Alexander	3:31
11.	"This Town Ain't a Town"	Clawson; Chris DeStefano; Gorley	3:20
Total length:			35:36

United States (EP)
No.	Title	Writer(s)	Length
1.	"Wastin' Gas"	Craig; Dragstrem; Nite	3:01
2.	"Cheap Seats"	Buxton; Frasure; Parol	3:14
3.	"Lifted"	Stover; Johnston; Maloy	3:22
4.	"Heat Rises"	Clawson; Johnston; Copperman	3:59
5.	"Thinkin' 'Bout You"	Akins; Gorley; Robbins	2:23
6.	"Just Say When"	Clawson; Copperman; Hayslip	3:19
7.	"Tippin' Point" (live)	Kelley; Hubbard; Johnston	3:19
Total length:			21:37

== Personnel ==
Adapted from the CD booklet.

- Kristin Barlowe – photography
- Scott Cooke – bass guitar, digital editing
- Scott Johnson – production assistance
- Charlie Judge – keyboard
- Troy Lancaster – electric guitar
- Charles McHugh – drums
- Joey Moi – production, mixing, recording, acoustic guitar, electric guitar, background vocals, percussion
- Jamie Moore – keyboard, percussion
- Eivind Nordland – recording assistance
- Lloyd Aur Norman – cover art
- Russ Pahl – pedal steel
- Danny Rader – acoustic guitar, ganjo, bouzouki
- Adam Schoenfeld – electric guitar
- Jimmie Lee Sloas – bass guitar
- Dallas Smith – lead vocals, background vocals
- Darren Savard – electric guitar
- Bryan Sutton – acoustic guitar, banjo, dobro, bouzouki, mandolin
- Ilya Toshinsky – electric guitar
- Derek Wells – electric guitar
- Hank Williams – mastering

== Chart performance ==
=== Album/EP ===
Chart (2014)	Peak position
Canadian Albums (Billboard)	14
US Top Country Albums (Billboard)	39
US Heatseekers Albums (Billboard)	6
US Independent Albums (Billboard)	47

=== Singles ===
Year	Single	Peak chart positions	
Year	Single	CAN Country	CAN
2013	"Tippin' Point"	5	36
2014	"Slow Rollin'"	5	65
2014	"A Girl Like You"	6	58
2014	"Wastin' Gas"	1	41
2015	"Lifted"	5	77
2015	"Cheap Seats"	5	75

== Certifications ==
Region	Certification	Certified units/sales
Canada (Music Canada)	Platinum	80,000^{‡}
^{‡} Sales+streaming figures based on certification alone.
