= Nothing but Summer =

Single by Dallas Smith

from the album Jumped Right In
- Released: April 2013
- Genre: Country rock
- Length: 3:06
- Label: 604
- Songwriter(s): Chris Tompkins; Joe Collins; Mark Irwin; Joey Moi
- Producer(s): Joey Moi

Dallas Smith singles chronology
"What Kinda Love" (2013)	"Nothing but Summer" (2013)	"Tippin' Point" (2013)

"Nothing but Summer" is a song recorded by Canadian country rock artist Dallas Smith. It was released in April 2013 as the fifth single from his debut solo album, Jumped Right In. It peaked at number 70 on the Canadian Hot 100 in June 2013.

== Critical reception ==
Casadie Pederson of Top Country wrote that the song "is destined to be the song of the summer." She said that "Smith’s vocals on this track are spot on and slay the tempo of the song."

== Music video ==
The music video was directed by Stephano Barberis and premiered in May 2013.

== Chart performance ==
"Nothing but Summer" debuted at number 80 on the Canadian Hot 100 for the week of June 15, 2013.

Chart (2013)	Peak position
Canada (Canadian Hot 100)	70
Canada Country (Billboard)	6

== Certifications ==
Region	Certification	Certified units/sales
Canada (Music Canada)	Gold	40,000^{‡}
^{‡} Sales+streaming figures based on certification alone.
