= Jumped Right In (song) =

Single by Dallas Smith

from the album Jumped Right In
- Released: August 2012
- Genre: Country rock
- Length: 3:57
- Label: 604
- Songwriter(s): Chris Tompkins; Felix McTeigue
- Producer(s): Joey Moi

Dallas Smith singles chronology
"If It Gets You Where You Wanna Go" (2012)	"Jumped Right In" (2012)	"What Kinda Love" (2013)

"Jumped Right In" is a song recorded by Canadian country rock artist Dallas Smith. It was released in August 2012 as the third single from his debut solo album, Jumped Right In. It peaked at number 69 on the Canadian Hot 100 in December 2012.

"Jumped Right In" was nominated for Single of the Year at the 2013 Canadian Country Music Association Awards. The song became Smith's first single to receive a Gold certification from Music Canada in November 2013.

== Music video ==
The music video was directed by Stephano Barberis and premiered in August 2012.

== Chart performance ==
"Jumped Right In" debuted at number 86 on the Canadian Hot 100 for the week of September 15, 2012.

Chart (2012)	Peak position
Canada (Canadian Hot 100)	69
Canada Country (Billboard)	4

== Certifications ==
Region	Certification	Certified units/sales
Canada (Music Canada)	Gold	5,000^{^}
^{^} Shipments figures based on certification alone.
