= One Little Kiss =

2013 country song

"One Little Kiss (Never Killed Nobody)"

Song by Jake Owen

from the album Days of Gold
- Genre: Country
- Length: 2:59
- Songwriters: Ashley Gorley; Jimmy Robbins; Shane McAnally
- Producer: Joey Moi

"One Little Kiss"

Single by Dallas Smith

from the album Side Effects
- Released: April 22, 2016
- Genre: Country pop; country rock
- Length: 3:02
- Label: 604; Dallas Smith Music
- Songwriters: Ashley Gorley; Jimmy Robbins; Shane McAnally
- Producer: Joey Moi

Dallas Smith singles chronology
"Kids with Cars" (2015)	"One Little Kiss" (2016)	"Autograph" (2016)

"One Little Kiss" is a country song written by Ashley Gorley, Jimmy Robbins, and Shane McAnally. It was originally recorded by American country singer Jake Owen for his 2013 studio album, Days of Gold, under the title "One Little Kiss (Never Killed Nobody)". The song was covered by Canadian country rock artist Dallas Smith three years later with the abbreviated title of "One Little Kiss". Both recordings were produced by Joey Moi. Smith's version was released April 22, 2016 through 604 Records as the second single off his third studio album, Side Effects (2016).

== Reception ==
=== Critical ===
Corey Kelly of Canadian music blog Soundcheck Entertainment was complimentary of the song for both its "great production" and Smith's "kick ass voice." He also made note of its marketability to American country radio.

=== Commercial ===
"One Little Kiss" debuted at number 93 on the Billboard Canadian Hot 100 chart dated May 14, 2016. The song reached #1 on the iTunes Country singles chart and entered the Hot Canadian Digital Songs component chart at number 29 for the week of May 14, 2016. "One Little Kiss" entered the Canada Country airplay chart at number 30 and has since reached a peak position of 5. It was the most-played single on Canadian country radio by a Canadian artist in 2016 (and thirtieth overall).

== Chart performance ==
=== Weekly charts ===
Chart (2016)	Peak position
Canada (Canadian Hot 100)	93
Canada Country (Billboard)	5

=== Year end charts ===
Chart (2016)	Position
Canada Country (Billboard)	30

== Certifications ==
Region	Certification	Certified units/sales
Canada (Music Canada)	Gold	40,000^{‡}
^{‡} Sales+streaming figures based on certification alone.
