= Use Me (Dallas Smith song) =

2024 single by Dallas Smith

Single by Dallas Smith

from the album Dallas Smith
- Released: April 1, 2024
- Studio: Blackbird Studio D (Nashville, Tennessee)
- Genre: Country
- Length: 3:46
- Label: Local Hay; Big Loud
- Songwriters: John Byron; Jared Hampton; Tate Howell
- Producer: Joey Moi

Dallas Smith singles chronology
"Fixer Upper" (2023)	"Use Me" (2024)	"CRZY" (2024)

Music video
- "Use Me" (Live In Concert) on YouTube

"Use Me" is a song recorded by Canadian country artist Dallas Smith. The song was written by John Byron, Jared Hampton, and Tate Howell and produced by Smith's longtime collaborator Joey Moi. It is the fifth single from Smith's self-titled album released in 2023. The song reached #1 on the Mediabase Canada Country chart.

== Background ==
Smith stated that "Use Me" "barely made the record", but it was one of his favourites of the songs he was considering, and he therefore convinced his label, Big Loud Records, to include it on his album. Gabby Shukin of CJVR Today's Beat Country described the song as being "about a girl that keeps going back to him after she's having relationship problems with her boyfriend. And he's there to hold her and comfort her but it hurts him like crazy. But he says it's okay for her to use him like that because that's the closest he'll ever get to having any relationship with her". In 2024, the song was released to radio formats in Canada, Australia, and the United Kingdom.

== Live performances ==
Smith released a video of "Use Me" live from a concert in Fort McMurray, Alberta, on YouTube. In June 2024, Smith performed "Use Me" during his solo debut at the Grand Ole Opry in Nashville, Tennessee. That same month, he performed "Use Me" live for RFD-TV.

== Charts ==
Chart performance for "Use Me"
Chart (2024)	Peak position
Canada Country (Billboard)	2
