= Singing in a Beer =

2023 song by Dallas Smith

Single by Dallas Smith

from the album Dallas Smith
- Released: January 27, 2023
- Genre: Country
- Length: 2:52
- Label: Big Loud; Local Hay
- Songwriters: Rocky Block; Casey Brown; Parker Welling
- Producer: Joey Moi

Dallas Smith singles chronology
"One Too" (2022)	"Singing in a Beer" (2023)	"Fixer Upper" (2023)

Performance Video
- "Singing in a Beer" on YouTube

"Singing in a Beer" is a song recorded by Canadian country music artist Dallas Smith. The track was written by Rocky Block, Casey Brown, and Parker Welling, while it was produced by Joey Moi. It is the third single off Smith's self-titled fifth studio album, which was released in October 2023.

== Background and promotion ==
Smith remarked that he was excited to perform the song live at festivals in the summer.

Smith previewed the song ahead of its release during an interview with American radio and television personality Bobby Bones on Bones' podcast and interview series, the Bobby Cast. He told Bones that he believed in the quality of the song.

== Music video ==
Smith released a performance video for "Singing in a Beer" on January 26, 2023. He later released a video of an acoustic live performance on May 11, 2023.

== Charts ==
Chart performance for "Singing in a Beer"
Chart (2023)	Peak position
Canada Country (Billboard)	5
