= How Do You Miss Me =

2025 single by Dallas Smith

Single by Dallas Smith featuring Alexandra Kay
- Released: March 14, 2025
- Genre: Country
- Length: 3:03
- Label: Big Loud; Mercury; Republic
- Songwriters: Ashley Gorley; Michael Hardy; Mark Holman
- Producer: Joey Moi

Dallas Smith singles chronology
"CRZY" (2024)	"How Do You Miss Me" (2025)	"One Good Life" (2025)

Alexandra Kay singles chronology
"How Do You Miss Me" (2025)	"Straight for the Heart" (2025)

Visualizer
- "How Do You Miss Me" on YouTube

"How Do You Miss Me" is a song recorded by Canadian country artist Dallas Smith featuring American country artist Alexandra Kay. The song was written by Ashley Gorley, Michael Hardy, and Mark Holman, while Joey Moi produced the track. Smith had originally recorded a solo version of the song on his self-titled album in 2023.

== Music video ==
The official visualizer for "How Do You Miss Me" premiered on YouTube on April 2, 2025. It includes footage of Dallas Smith appearing as a surprise guest at an Alexandra Kay concert and joining her to perform the song. The official music video for the solo version of "How Do You Miss Me" premiered on November 1, 2023.

== Credits and personnel ==
Credits adapted from Apple Music.

- Sean Badum – recording engineer
- Josh Ditty – recording engineer
- Jacob Durrett – recording engineer
- Jessica Hood – photography
- Ted Jensen – master engineer
- Alexandra Kay – featured vocals
- Joey Moi – production
- Eivind Nordlamd – mixing engineer
- Jerry Roe – drums, tambourine, shaker
- Dallas Smith – primary vocals
- Jimmie Lee Sloas – bass
- Ilya Toshinsky – acoustic guitar
- Derek Wells – electric guitar
- Jessica Woodward – photography
- Ryan Yount – recording engineer

== Charts ==
=== Weekly charts ===
Weekly chart performance for "How Do You Miss Me"
Chart (2025)	Peak position
Canada Hot 100 (Billboard)	91
Canada Country (Billboard)	4

=== Year-end charts ===
Year-end chart performance for "How Do You Miss Me"
Chart (2025)	Position
Canada Country (Billboard)	21
