= Lifted (Dallas Smith song) =

Single by Dallas Smith

from the album Lifted
- Released: February 17, 2015
- Genre: Country rock
- Length: 3:21
- Label: 604; Republic Nashville
- Songwriters: Jeremy Stover; Jaren Johnston; Zac Maloy
- Producer: Joey Moi

Dallas Smith singles chronology
"Wastin' Gas" (2014)	"Lifted" (2015)	"Cheap Seats" (2015)

"Lifted" is a song recorded by Canadian country music artist Dallas Smith for his second studio album of the same name (2014). The ballad about young love was written by Jeremy Stover, Jaren Johnston, and Zac Maloy, and is Smith's favourite song on the record. It was released to Canadian country radio on February 17, 2015 as the second single off the album, or fifth including the singles from Tippin' Point (2014).

== Chart performance ==
"Lifted" debuted at number thirty-nine on the Billboard Canada Country airplay chart for the chart dated March 7, 2015 – the highest debut of the week.

== Music video ==
The video for "Lifted" was directed by Nigel Dick and premiered March 9, 2015 on CMT Canada.

== Charts ==
Chart (2015)	Peak position
Canada Hot 100 (Billboard)	77
Canada Country (Billboard)	5

== Certifications ==
Region	Certification	Certified units/sales
Canada (Music Canada)	Gold	40,000^{‡}
^{‡} Sales+streaming figures based on certification alone.
