= Side Effects (Dallas Smith album) =

Studio album by Dallas Smith
- Released: September 2, 2016
- Recorded: 2015–16
- Genre: Country
- Length: 38:23
- Labels: 604; Sony Canada
- Producer: Joey Moi

Dallas Smith chronology
| Lifted (2014) | Side Effects (2016) | Acoustic Sessions Vol. 1 (2018) |

Singles from Side Effects
- 1. "Kids with Cars" Released: September 11, 2015; 2. "One Little Kiss" Released: April 22, 2016; 3. "Autograph" Released: August 19, 2016; 4. "Side Effects" Released: January 23, 2017; 5. "Sky Stays This Blue" Released: May 16, 2017; 6. "Sleepin' Around" Released: October 2, 2017

Side Effects is the third solo studio album by Canadian country rock artist Dallas Smith, released on September 2, 2016 through 604 Records. The album marks Smith's first full-length release to impact the American market. It includes the top-10 singles "Kids with Cars" and "One Little Kiss", as well as the chart-topping hits, "Autograph", "Side Effects", "Sky Stays This Blue", and "Sleepin' Around". Side Effects set a new record as the first album by a Canadian country artist to generate four number-one singles.

== Background ==
Following the success achieved in both Canada and the US with 2014's Lifted, Smith signed an American record deal with Blaster Records in August 2015. He began working on a new album with producer Joey Moi, which would be his first full-length record to be released to both countries. The album's lead single, "Kids with Cars", was released September 11, 2016. It was the first single of his career to officially impact mainstream country radio in the US, though it failed to chart in that country.

On August 16, 2016, CMT Canada formally announced the title, cover art, release date, and track listing for Side Effects. Pre-orders for the album began on August 19, 2016 and it was officially released September 2, 2016.

== Commercial performance ==
Side Effects debuted at number seven on the Billboard Canadian Albums chart, with 4,000 album-equivalent units in its first week. This made the album Smith's first top ten entry and highest-charting record to date. It was also the Canadian country album with the largest first-week sales figure, according to Nielsen SoundScan and as reported by Top Country.

Side Effects sold 600 copies in the US in its debut week. The album failed to enter any American Billboard album charts, but did reach number 10 on the West North Central region-specific component chart of the Heatseekers Albums tally.

=== Singles ===
Smith set a number of records with the singles released from Side Effects, becoming the first Canadian male artist to earn four number one country singles, the first Canadian male artist to generate three number one country singles from one album ("Autograph", "Side Effects", and "Sky Stays This Blue"), (Note: Shania Twain was the first Canadian artist to achieve this feat, sending three singles from Come On Over to number one, but Smith is the first male to do so.) and the first Canadian country artist to post three consecutive number one country singles. The album's sixth single, "Sleepin' Around", also reached number one, making Side Effects the first album to produce four chart-topping singles and tying Smith with Shania Twain as the artists with the most career number ones.

== Track listing ==
| No. | Title | Writer(s) | Length |
|---|---|---|---|
| 1. | "Only One You" | Jaren Johnston; Neil Mason; Jeremy Stover | 3:04 |
| 2. | "Side Effects" | Matt Rogers; Ben Stennis; Blake Bollinger | 2:57 |
| 3. | "Sky Stays This Blue" | Ross Copperman; Ashley Gorley; Josh Osborne | 2:52 |
| 4. | "Tab with My Name on It" | Aaron Eshuis; Ryan Hurd; Joey Hyde | 3:50 |
| 5. | "Autograph" | Nicolle Galyon; Copperman; Haley Georgia | 2:55 |
| 6. | "50/50" | Rodney Clawson; Jamie Moore | 3:57 |
| 7. | "Kids with Cars" | Jesse Frasure; Brad Tursi; Hurd | 3:01 |
| 8. | "Hoods and Tailgates" | Tom Douglas; Johnston; Jonathan Singleton | 3:11 |
| 9. | "One Little Kiss" | Gorley; Shane McAnally; Jimmy Robbins | 3:02 |
| 10. | "I'm Already Gone" | Clawson; Copperman; Marv Green | 3:07 |
| 11. | "Sleepin' Around" | Rhett Akins; Gorley; Robbins | 3:21 |
| 12. | "Twelve Pack Soundtrack" | Copperman; Josh Kear; Chris Tompkins | 3:06 |
| Total length: | | | 38:23 |

== Personnel ==
Adapted from the CD booklet.

- Tom Bukovac – electric guitar
- Dave Cohen – keyboard
- Scott Cooke – mixing, recording, digital editing, bass guitar
- Shannon Forrest – drums
- Nick Lane – recording
- Pete Lyman – mastering
- Joey Moi – production, mixing, recording, electric guitar, background vocals, percussion programming
- Jamie Moore – keyboard, percussion programming
- Eivind Nordland – digital editing, engineering
- Lloyd Aur Norman – art direction, design
- Russ Pahl – pedal steel
- Chad Rook – photography
- Delaney Royer – cover photo, photography
- Adam Schoenfeld – electric guitar
- Jimmie Lee Sloas – bass guitar
- Dallas Smith – lead vocals, background vocals
- Bryan Sutton – acoustic guitar, banjo, bouzouki, mandolin
- Ilya Toshinsky – acoustic guitar, electric guitar, banjo, mandolin
- Nir Zidkyahu – drums

== Charts ==
=== Album ===
| Chart (2016) | Peak position |
|---|---|
| Canadian Albums (Billboard) | 7 |

== Certifications ==
| Region | Certification | Certified units/sales |
|---|---|---|
| Canada (Music Canada) | Gold | 40,000^{‡} |
^{‡} Sales+streaming figures based on certification alone.
