= Sleepin' Around =

Single by Dallas Smith

from the album Side Effects
- Released: October 2, 2017
- Genre: Country pop
- Length: 3:21
- Label: 604
- Songwriter(s): Rhett Akins; Ashley Gorley; Jimmy Robbins
- Producer(s): Joey Moi

Dallas Smith singles chronology
"Sky Stays This Blue" (2017)	"Sleepin' Around" (2017)	"One Drink Ago" (2018)

"Sleepin' Around" is a song written by Rhett Akins, Ashley Gorley, and Jimmy Robbins, and recorded by Canadian country music singer Dallas Smith for his third studio album, Side Effects (2016). The song was released to radio by 604 Records on October 2, 2017 as the album's sixth single. "Sleepin' Around" reached number one on the Canada Country chart in January 2018, helping Smith break the record previously set by Shania Twain for the most chart-topping singles by a Canadian country artist from a single album.

== Chart performance ==
"Sleepin' Around" entered the Canada Country chart in October 2017 and peaked at number one on the chart dated January 27, 2018. The song earned Smith his record-extending seventeenth top-ten single. "Sleepin' Around" is the fourth number one from the Side Effects album, breaking the record previously set by Shania Twain, who earned three number ones from Come On Over. The song is also Smith's fifth career number one, tying him with Twain for the most chart toppers in the Nielsen BDS chart era.

== Music video ==
The song's music video was released October 12, 2017. It depicts a man who awakens in the night and paces his apartment while regularly checking his phone, before ultimately leaving his apartment at the end of the video.

== Charts ==
Chart (2017–18)	Peak position
Canada Country (Billboard)	1
