= Seaforth (duo) =

Australian country musical duo

- Origin: Seaforth, Australia
- Genres: Country, country pop
- Years active: 2017–present
- Labels: Back Row; Sony Nashville; RCA Nashville; Arista Nashville; ABC Music
- Members: Mitch Thompson; Tom Jordan
- Website: weareseaforth.com

Seaforth is a musical duo of Tom Jordan and Mitch Thompson. They were signed to Sony Nashville and released their debut EP in April 2019. In October 2024, Thompson revealed that Jordan had left the duo, and he would continue Seaforth as a solo project. The duo reunited in 2026.

== Career ==
=== 2017-2021: Career beginnings ===
Tom Jordan and Mitch Thompson grew up together in the Sydney, Australia suburb of Seaforth. After forming the band and considering multiple monikers, the duo decided to name themselves after their hometown.

Jordan and Thompson travelled back and forth between the USA and Australia for six years, developing their songwriting and in 2017, they moved to USA full-time.

In November 2018, they signed with RCA/Sony Nashville. and on 16 November 2018, released their debut singles "Love That" and "Talk to Me".

In April 2019, Seaforth released their debut EP Love That. In May 2019, Taste of Country named the duo one of '5 Artists to Watch'.

In July, Seaforth collaborated with fellow country artist Mitchell Tenpenny on a single called "Anything She Says". At the global APRA Awards in March 2020, Seaforth won Breakthrough Songwriter of the Year award.

On 29 May 2020, Seaforth released "Everything Falls for You". Upon release the duo said "Our buddy Derrick Southerland brought in the title 'Everything Falls for You' and we instantly knew it was special. Through specific imagery – whether it be the rose petals, rain, stars – we wanted to paint the picture of falling in love with someone incredible, and how it can feel like the whole world is falling for them with you."

On 2 April 2021, it was reported that Seaforth moved to Arista Nashville from RCA Nashville.

=== 2022-2024: What I Get for Loving You ===
In August 2022, Seaforth announced the forthcoming release of EP What I Get for Loving You. The EP features previously released singles, "Breakups", "Good Beer", "Queen of Daytona Beach" and the title track. The duo co-wrote Canadian country artists Dallas Smith and MacKenzie Porter's 2022 duet single "One Too" with Rocky Block and Alyssa Vanderhym.

On 16 June 2023, Seaforth released their independent debut single, "Get the Girl".

=== 2025: Signing with ABC Music ===
In April 2025, ABC Music announced they had signed Seaforth. The first single on the label "Her and My Hometown" was released on 2 May 2025.

== Tours ==
Seaforth have toured with recording artist Mitchell Tenpenny and have also opened for Kane Brown.

In April 2024, Seaforth embarked on their UK tour, with dates in London, Bristol, Manchester, Glasgow, Belfast and Dublin in the Republic of Ireland.

== Discography ==
=== EPs ===
List of EPs
| Title | Details |
|---|---|
| Love That | Released: 12 April 2019; Label: Sony Nashville; Formats: Digital download, streaming |
| Reimagined | Released: 13 September 2019; Label: Sony Nashville; Formats: Digital download, streaming |
| What I Get for Loving You | Released: 26 August 2022; Label: Sony Music; Formats: Digital download, streaming |

=== Singles as lead artist ===
List of singles as lead artist
| Year | Title | Peak chart positions | Album |
| Year | Title | US Country | Album |
|---|---|---|---|
| 2018 | "Love That" | 50 | Love That |
| 2018 | "Talk to Me" | — | Love That |
| 2020 | "Everything Falls for You" | — | non album singles |
| 2020 | "Talk About" | — | non album singles |
| 2020 | "Close Enough" | — | non album singles |
| 2021 | "Breakups" | — | What I Get for Loving You |
| 2022 | "Good Beer" (with Jordan Davis) | — | What I Get for Loving You |
| 2022 | "Queen of Daytona Beach" (with Sean Kingston) | — | What I Get for Loving You |
| 2022 | "What I Get for Loving You" | — | What I Get for Loving You |
| 2023 | "Get the Girl" | — | TBA |
| 2023 | "Been Better" | — | TBA |
| 2023 | "Loud Music" | — | TBA |
| 2023 | "A Year and Some Change" | — | non album single |
| 2024 | "Easy to Love" | — | TBA |
| 2024 | "Forget About It" | — | TBA |
| 2025 | "Her and My Hometown" | — | TBA |
| 2025 | "There She Goes" | — | TBA |
| 2025 | "Wasn't Gonna Cry" | — | TBA |
| 2025 | "By the Way" | — | TBA |

=== Singles as featured artist ===
List of singles as featured artist
| Year | Title | Peak chart positions | | Certifications | Album |
| Year | Title | US Country | US Country Airplay | Certifications | Album |
|---|---|---|---|---|---|
| 2019 | "Anything She Says" (with Mitchell Tenpenny) | 45 | 58 | RIAA: Platinum | TBA |

== Awards and nominations ==
=== APRA Awards (Australia) ===
The APRA Awards are held in Australia and New Zealand by the Australasian Performing Right Association to recognise songwriting skills, sales and airplay performance by its members annually. Seaforth have been nominated for two awards.

| Year | Nominee / work | Award | Result | Ref. |
|---|---|---|---|---|
| 2020 | "Love That" | Most Performed Country Work of the Year | Nominated | |
| 2022 | "Breakups" | Most Performed Country Work of the Year | Nominated | |
| 2023 | "Good Beer" | Most Performed Country Work of the Year | Nominated | |

=== APRA Awards (Global) ===
| Year | Nominee / work | Award | Result |
|---|---|---|---|
| 2020 | Themselves | Breakthrough Songwriter of the Year (Nashville) | Won |

=== Country Music Awards of Australia ===
The Country Music Awards of Australia is an annual awards night held in January during the Tamworth Country Music Festival. Celebrating recording excellence in the Australian country music industry. They commenced in 1973.

| Year | Nominee / work | Award | Result | Ref. |
|---|---|---|---|---|
| 2020 | Seaforth ("Love That") | New Talent of the Year | Nominated | |
