= One Too =

2022 song by Dallas Smith

Single by Dallas Smith and MacKenzie Porter

from the album Dallas Smith
- Released: May 27, 2022
- Genre: Country
- Length: 3:21
- Label: Big Loud; Local Hay
- Songwriters: Tom Jordan; Mitch Thompson; Rocky Block; Alyssa Vanderhym
- Producers: Joey Moi; Tom Jordan

Dallas Smith singles chronology
"Best of Me" (2022)	"One Too" (2022)	"Singing in a Beer" (2023)

MacKenzie Porter singles chronology
"Pickup" (2022)	"One Too" (2022)	"Chasing Tornadoes" (2023)

Music video
- "One Too" on YouTube

"One Too" is a song recorded by Canadian country artists Dallas Smith and MacKenzie Porter. The song was written by Tom Jordan and Mitch Thompson of Seaforth along with Rocky Block and Alyssa Vanderhym. Jordan produced the track with Joey Moi, while it marked the second time Porter collaborated with Smith after the track "Friends Don't Let Friends Drink Alone" from Smith's 2020 studio album Timeless. The song is the second single from Smith's self-titled album.

== Background ==
Smith called the song a "gift" from songwriters Tom Jordan, Mitch Thompson, Rocky Block, and Alyssa Vanderhym, adding that it "strikes every chord both personally and musically". Porter remarked that she was excited to duet with Smith. She also stated that it was Smith who introduced her to her current producer Joey Moi, as well as her now-label and management team at Big Loud, back in 2016.

== Commercial performance ==
"One Too" reached a peak of number six on the Billboard Canada Country chart for the week of November 5, 2022, marking Smith's first single to not reach number one since "One Drink Ago" in 2018. Nonetheless, it extended his run of twenty-five consecutive top ten hits since the beginning of his solo career. It also marked Porter's seventh top ten. The song peaked at number 90 on the all-genre Canadian Hot 100 for the same week, spending six weeks on the chart in total. It has been certified Gold by Music Canada.

== Music video ==
The official music video for "One Too" premiered on Country Now on June 22, 2022. The video features Smith and Porter playing the roles of two former lovers who are looking back at the pain of a lost relationship. Footage shot by the two artists on an 8mm camera that is intended to represent flashbacks of the relationship is mixed in as well. Smith stated that the video "tells the story of a couple that was madly in love and broke up in a non-contentious way," adding that "it's not meant to be sad, but reflective of a love that isn't anymore". Porter added that the two wanted to make the video feel "real, honest, and raw," which is why they captured the flashback videos on a smaller camera, while their performances were filmed separately to "express the pain of the relationship ending". Smith believes that the video "really represents the song well". A separate video was filmed for their "Spotify Single" rendition of the track that was released in September 2022.

== Accolades ==
Accolades for "One Too"
Year	Association	Category	Result	Ref
2023	Canadian Country Music Association	Musical Collaboration of the Year	Won	
2023	Canadian Country Music Association	Record Producer of the Year (Joey Moi)	Nominated	
2023	Canadian Country Music Association	Video of the Year	Nominated	

== Charts ==
Chart performance for "One Too"
Chart (2022)	Peak position
Canada Hot 100 (Billboard)	90
Canada Country (Billboard)	6

== Certifications ==
Certifications for "One Too"
Region	Certification	Certified units/sales
Canada (Music Canada)	Gold	40,000^{‡}
^{‡} Sales+streaming figures based on certification alone.
