= A Girl Like You (Dallas Smith song) =

- "A Girl Like You" cover with promotional caption "new single at radio now"

Single by Dallas Smith

from the album Tippin' Point
- Released: June 23, 2014
- Genre: Country pop
- Length: 3:14
- Label: 604; Republic Nashville
- Songwriter(s): Jaren Johnston; Jimmy Robbins
- Producer(s): Joey Moi

Dallas Smith singles chronology
"Slow Rollin'" (2014)	"A Girl Like You" (2014)	"Wastin' Gas" (2014)

"A Girl Like You'" is a song written by Jaren Johnston and Jimmy Robbins, and recorded by Canadian country rock singer Dallas Smith for his first extended play, Tippin' Point (2014). It was serviced to Canadian country radio via 604 Records on June 23, 2014 as the third single from the EP.

== Critical reception ==
Markus Meyer of country music blog The Shotgun Seat praised "A Girl Like You" for subverting expectations and being a love song rather than a degrading lyric. He writes: ""A Girl Like You" isn't deep, but it is well-written and features some clever lines ... Combine that with the solid tempo change throughout ... , a catchy melody and a restrained production, and you have one very enjoyable package." Shenieka Russell-Metcalf of Canadian country blog Top Country called "A Girl Like You" the kind of love song that "every lady wants to have written for her," noting that the song "has a great sound to it and it brings a smile to your face when you hear it."

== Music video ==
The video for "A Girl Like You", directed by Joel Stewart, premiered August 7, 2014 on Smith's official YouTube channel and features a live acoustic rendition of the song. It is Smith's first music video not to be directed by Stephano Barberis.

== Chart performance ==
"A Girl Like You" debuted at number 82 on the Billboard Canadian Hot 100 for the week ending August 2, 2014.

Chart (2014)	Peak position
Canada (Canadian Hot 100)	58
Canada Country (Billboard)	6
