= Side Effects (Dallas Smith song) =

Single by Dallas Smith

from the album Side Effects
- Released: January 23, 2017
- Genre: Country pop; country rock
- Length: 2:57
- Label: 604
- Songwriter(s): Matthew J Rogers; Ben Stennis; Blake Bollinger
- Producer(s): Joey Moi

Dallas Smith singles chronology
"Autograph" (2016)	"Side Effects" (2017)	"Sky Stays This Blue" (2017)

"Side Effects" is a song written by Matthew Rogers, Ben Stennis, and Blake Bollinger and recorded by Canadian country singer Dallas Smith for his third studio album of the same name (2016). It was serviced to Canadian country radio the week of January 23, 2017 as the record's fourth single.

== Chart performance ==
"Side Effects" debuted at number 50 on the Billboard Canada Country chart dated February 4, 2017 and has since earned Smith a record-extending fifteenth consecutive top 10 single. It reached the top position on the chart dated April 22, 2017, giving Smith a third number one. With this ascension, Smith becomes the first Canadian country artist to have at least three number ones at country radio since 1995, and the first to post back-to-back number ones since Shania Twain last achieved the feat in 1998. Despite the song's airplay success, "Side Effects" became the first single of Smith's career to fail to enter the Canadian Hot 100. Nonetheless, it has been certified Platinum by Music Canada.

== Music video ==
An accompanying music video was directed by Stefan Berrill and premiered February 24, 2017. Smith released a trailer for the video on February 17, 2017 with an announcement that the full video was to be released the following Friday. The "cinematic" video examines a relationship in the process of breaking down and ends in a car crash involving the two leads with an ambiguous outcome. The video's production has been compared to that of a feature film, with CISN-FM referring to it as a "mini-movie."

== Charts ==
Chart (2017)	Peak position
Canada Country (Billboard)	1

=== Year-end charts ===
Chart (2017)	Position
Canada Country (Billboard)	37

== Certifications ==
Region	Certification	Certified units/sales
Canada (Music Canada)	Platinum	80,000^{‡}
^{‡} Sales+streaming figures based on certification alone.
