= CRZY (Dallas Smith song) =

2024 single by Dallas Smith

Single by Dallas Smith

from the album Dallas Smith
- Released: November 18, 2024
- Genre: Country
- Length: 3:39
- Label: Local Hay; Big Loud
- Songwriter(s): Jaren Johnston; Travis Meadows; Stephen Wilson Jr.
- Producer(s): Joey Moi

Dallas Smith singles chronology
"Use Me" (2024)	"CRZY" (2024)	"How Do You Miss Me" (2025)

Lyric Video
- "CRZY" on YouTube

"CRZY" is a song recorded by Canadian country artist Dallas Smith. The song was written by Jaren Johnston, Travis Meadows, and Stephen Wilson Jr., while it was produced by Smith's longtime collaborator Joey Moi. It is the sixth single from Smith's self-titled album released in 2023.

== Background ==
"CRZY" is a song that reflects on the end of a relationship, where the narrator stays home and the other person leaves for college. The song was originally released in September 2023 as an instant gratification track for Smith's self-titled album, alongside "Fixer Upper". Smith called both tracks "authentic to his story". He noted that with "CRZY", it was "important to have those traditional influences on me represented in song and production and the instruments used."

== Critical reception ==
An uncredited review from Front Porch Music noted the use of "poignant lyrics and soul-stirring melody" in the song.

== Live performance ==
In January 2024, Smith released a video of "CRZY" live from a concert at CNOOC Field House at MacDonald Island Park in Fort McMurray, Alberta, on YouTube. The video was filmed by Justin Clough.

== Music videos ==
Smith released a lyric video for "CRZY" on September 29, 2023, the day of its release to digital retailers. Shortly ahead of "CRZY" becoming a single to country radio, Smith released an acoustic performance video on September 3, 2024.

== Charts ==
Chart performance for "CRZY"
Chart (2025)	Peak position
Canada Country (Billboard)	6
