= Fixer Upper (Dallas Smith song) =

2023 song by Dallas Smith

Single by Dallas Smith

from the album Dallas Smith
- Released: September 29, 2023
- Studio: Blackbird Studio A (Nashville, Tennessee)
- Genre: Country pop
- Length: 3:07
- Label: Local Hay; Big Loud
- Songwriters: Matt Dragstrem; Brett Tyler; Morgan Wallen
- Producers: Joey Moi; Jacob Durrett

Dallas Smith singles chronology
"Singing in a Beer" (2023)	"Fixer Upper" (2023)	"Use Me" (2024)

Music video
- "Fixer Upper" on YouTube

"Fixer Upper" is a song recorded by Canadian country artist Dallas Smith. The song was written by Morgan Wallen, Matt Dragstrem, and Brett Tyler, and produced by Joey Moi and Jacob Durrett. It is the fourth single from Smith's self-titled album released in 2023. The song reached number one on the Mediabase Canada Country chart.

== Background ==
Smith remarked that when he heard "Fixer Upper" for the first time, he "knew [it] needed to be a part" of his "new musical chapter". He called it a "wonderfully written song", noting how he connected with it as he is "a little bit older now, but constantly a work in progress, always trying to improve who I am and what I bring to the table. Who I am as a father, a husband, [and] a friend…"

When Smith officially announced his self-titled album, "Fixer Upper" was released along with the song "CRZY" as instant gratification tracks.

== Critical reception ==
An uncredited review from Front Porch Music described "Fixer Upper" as a "heartwarming song that delves into the intricate world of self-work within a relationship," adding that "Smith's vocals bring the lyrics to life, making it a powerful anthem that so many people can relate to".

== Music video ==
The official music video for "Fixer Upper" premiered on YouTube on September 29, 2023. It was directed by Justin Clough and includes home videos of Smith and his family, which Smith described as "special".

== Charts ==
Chart performance for "Fixer Upper"
Chart (2024)	Peak position
Canada Country (Billboard)	4
