= Tippin' Point =

Single by Dallas Smith

from the album Tippin' Point
- Released: October 8, 2013
- Genre: Country
- Length: 2:58
- Label: 604; Republic Nashville
- Songwriters: Brian Kelley; Tyler Hubbard; Jaren Johnston
- Producer: Joey Moi

Dallas Smith singles chronology
"Nothing but Summer" (2013)	"Tippin' Point" (2013)	"Slow Rollin'" (2014)

"Tippin' Point" is a song recorded by Canadian country and rock artist Dallas Smith for his debut extended play of the same name (2014). It was released October 8, 2013, as the lead single for his then-forthcoming second studio album, as well as his first single in the American market since signing with Republic Nashville. A critical and commercial success, "Tippin' Point" peaked in the top 40 on the Billboard Canadian Hot 100 and set a record for the fastest Canadian country single to reach Gold certification by selling over 40,000 units in 13 weeks; it has since been certified Platinum.

== Background ==
In the fall of 2013, Smith signed to American label Republic Nashville and opened for country music duo Florida Georgia Line (also on Republic Nashville) on their "Here's to the Good Times" Tour. The song was written by Brian Kelley and Tyler Hubbard of Florida Georgia Line along with Jaren Johnston, and was produced by Joey Moi, who produced Smith's first solo album as well as Florida Georgia Line's Here's to the Good Times. In an interview with Digital Journal, Smith revealed the boys of Florida Georgia Line offered the song to him, and he wanted a chance to "put [his] own stamp on it." He also described the song to country music blog Roughstock as a "blend of what I love about country and rock," noting that "the song sums me up as an artist and is a great representation of where I'm going."

== Music video ==
The music video was directed by Stephano Barberis and premiered in January 2014.

== Chart performance ==
Chart (2013–14)	Peak position
Canada Hot 100 (Billboard)	36
Canada Country (Billboard)	5

== Certifications ==
Region	Certification	Certified units/sales
Canada (Music Canada)	Platinum	80,000^{*}
^{*} Sales figures based on certification alone.
