= Tippin' Point (EP) =

EP by Dallas Smith
- Released: March 4, 2014
- Genre: Country
- Length: 20:10 (Canada); 19:29 (U.S.)
- Label: 604; Universal Canada (Canada); Big Loud Mountain; Republic Nashville (U.S.)
- Producer: Joey Moi

Dallas Smith chronology
Jumped Right In (2012)	Tippin' Point (2014)	Lifted (2014)

Singles from Tippin' Point
- 1. "Tippin' Point" Released: October 8, 2013; 2. "Slow Rollin'" Released: March 19, 2014; 3. "A Girl Like You" Released: June 23, 2014

Professional ratings
Review scores
Source	Rating
Roughstock	3.5/5 stars

Tippin' Point is an extended play by Canadian rock and country artist Dallas Smith. It was released in the United States on March 4, 2014 via Big Loud Mountain Records and Republic Nashville under the production of Joey Moi.

Tippin' Point was also released in Canada via 604 Records and Universal Music Canada. The American version features "Nothing but Summer." in place of a live acoustic version of "Jumped Right In"

== Critical reception ==
Matt Bjorke of Roughstock gave the EP three and a half stars out of five, writing that "these songs are a strong presentation of Dallas Smith as a solo artist ready to break out as the next Country music star." Bjorke said that Smith has "an interesting and unique sound that is different than anyone in Country music and there’s more range in his voice than people may have expected" and felt that "there’s really not a song on the Tippin Point EP that couldn’t work on radio."

== Track listing ==
Canada
No.	Title	Writer(s)	Length
1.	"Tippin' Point"	Brian Kelley; Tyler Hubbard; Jaren Johnston	2:58
2.	"Slow Rollin'"	Rodney Clawson; Luke Laird	3:17
3.	"This Town Ain't a Town"	Clawson; Chris DeStefano; Ashley Gorley	3:20
4.	"A Girl Like You"	Jonhston; Jimmy Robbins	3:14
5.	"Wrong About That"	Clawson; Jon Randall; Jessi Alexander	3:31
6.	"Jumped Right In" (live acoustic)	Chris Tompkins; Felix McTeigue	3:50
Total length:			20:10

United States
No.	Title	Writer(s)	Length
1.	"Tippin' Point"	Kelley; Hubbard; Johnston	2:58
2.	"Slow Rollin'"	Clawson; Laird	3:17
3.	"This Town Ain't a Town"	Clawson; DeStefano; Gorley	3:20
4.	"Wrong About That"	Clawson; Randall; Alexander	3:31
5.	"A Girl Like You"	Johnston; Robbins	3:14
6.	"Nothing but Summer"	Tompkins; Jim Collins; Mark Irwin; Joey Moi	3:09
Total length:			19:29

== Chart performance ==
=== Album ===
Tippin' Point sold 2,000 copies in the United States in its first week of release.

Chart (2014)	Peak position
Canadian Albums (Billboard)	19
US Top Country Albums (Billboard)	31
US Heatseekers Albums (Billboard)	6

=== Singles ===
Year	Single	Peak chart positions	
Year	Single	CAN Country	CAN
2013	"Tippin' Point"	5	36
2014	"Slow Rollin'"	5	65
2014	"A Girl Like You"	6	58
