= Jumped Right In =

Studio album by Dallas Smith
- Released: May 22, 2012
- Genre: Country rock
- Length: 34:20
- Label: 604; Universal Canada
- Producer: Joey Moi

Dallas Smith chronology
Jumped Right In (2012)	Tippin' Point (2014)

Singles from Jumped Right In
- 1. "Somebody Somewhere" Released: November 7, 2011; 2. "If It Gets You Where You Wanna Go" Released: March 12, 2012; 3. "Jumped Right In" Released: August 2012; 4. "What Kinda Love" Released: January 7, 2013; 5. "Nothing but Summer" Released: April 2013

Professional ratings
Review scores
Source	Rating
Leader-Post	4/5 stars
Top Country	3.5/5 stars
aNewRisingMusic	5/5 stars

Jumped Right In is the first studio album by Canadian country music artist Dallas Smith. It was released on May 22, 2012 via 604 Records under the production of Joey Moi. Its first single, "Somebody Somewhere," peaked at number 79 on the Canadian Hot 100.

"If It Gets You Where You Wanna Go" was previously recorded by Steve Holy on his 2011 album Love Don't Run.

Jumped Right In was nominated for Country Album of the Year at the 2013 Juno Awards.

== Track listing ==
No.	Title	Writer(s)	Length
1.	"If It Gets You Where You Wanna Go"	Rodney Atkins; Rodney Clawson; Jim Collins	3:36
2.	"Somebody Somewhere"	Clawson; Lynn Hutton; Dustin Lynch	3:30
3.	"What Kinda Love"	Dallas Smith; Joey Moi; Zac Maloy	3:33
4.	"Jumped Right In"	Chris Tompkins; Felix McTeigue	3:57
5.	"Nothing but Summer"	Tompkins; Collins; Mark Irwin; Moi	3:06
6.	"Shotgun"	Craig Wiseman; Clawson	3:02
7.	"Stone Cold Killers"	Clawson; Collins	3:11
8.	"And Then Some"	Smith; Jennifer Schott; Moi; Danny Orton; Jeff Johnson	3:18
9.	"Never Saw Goodbye"	Schott; Orton; Maloy	3:49
10.	"The Song That's in My Head"	Chad Kroeger; Brett James	3:18
Total length:			34:20

== Chart performance ==
=== Album ===
Chart (2012)	Peak position
Canadian Albums (Billboard)	19

=== Singles ===
Year	Single	Peak chart positions	
Year	Single	CAN Country	CAN
2011	"Somebody Somewhere"	7	79
2012	"If It Gets You Where You Wanna Go"	6	74
2012	"Jumped Right In"	4	69
2013	"What Kinda Love"	7	77
2013	"Nothing but Summer"	6	70
"—" denotes releases that did not chart

== Certifications ==
Region	Certification	Certified units/sales
Canada (Music Canada)	Platinum	80,000^{‡}
^{‡} Sales+streaming figures based on certification alone.
