= Yangaroo =

Ad technology & service company

YANGAROO, Inc.
- Company type: Public
- Traded as: TSX-V: YOO
- Industry: Marketing, advertising & entertainment
- Founded: 1999; 27 years ago
- Headquarters: Canada
- Key people: Grant Schuetrumpf, CEO Richard Klosa, CTO Dom Kizek, CFO Adam Hunt, SVP Music
- Services: Systems and software for the advertising, music, and awards industries
- Website: yangaroo.com

Yangaroo is a Canadian media content technology company that offers a platform used by the advertising and music industries, award shows, and broadcasters for the management and distribution of advertising and entertainment content.

== History ==
The company was founded in Toronto in 1999.

In December 2014, Yangaroo announced a partnership with IMD Fastrax, the music distribution arm of delivery company IMD. The partnership enabled North American record labels and recording artists to deliver their music videos to the UK and Ireland via the IMD Fastrax platform.

In January 2020, Yangaroo reported that the TSX Venture Exchange had approved the company's proposal for a regular course issuer offer for up to 3 million shares of its common stock, which constituted 5% or less of the company's issued and outstanding securities.

In 2020, Yangaroo also formed a partnership with Universal Music Canada.

== Products ==
The Digital Media Distribution System (DMDS) is a technology platform provided by Yangaroo for the secure distribution of audio and video media via the internet. Systems like DMDS make it possible for broadcasters, TV advertisers, and post-production companies to move away from physical media like DigiBeta tapes to digital file-based workflows.

The DMDS service supports the following:

- Broadcasting music videos
- Distributing television advertisements
- Distributing award show content and voting
- Distributing music to television and radio platforms

Yangaroo music provides programmers, broadcasters, journalists, and other industry professionals the ability to preview and download pre-release media from music professionals, including record labels and independents.
