= Stephano Barberis =

Canadian music video director

- Born: Kitimat, British Columbia, Canada
- Education: Simon Fraser University; British Columbia Institute of Technology
- Occupation: Music video director
- Known for: videos
- Parent(s): Alexandre Barberis; Dora Barberis
- Awards: "Music Video Director of the Year" multiple wins
- Website: www.stephanobarberis.com

Stephano Barberis (born Stephen Barberis in Kitimat, British Columbia) is a Canadian music video director. By Autumn of 2022, Barberis had received 45 'Director Of The Year' and 'Video Of The Year' Awards, including a Leo Award, 21 consecutive BCCMAs, 12 CCMAs, and two CMAO in addition to over 100 'Director Of The Year' and 'Video Of The Year' nominations, including two MuchMusic MMVA’s. Stephano Barberis has directed over 200 music videos which include 21 official number one hits worldwide and over 60 official top 20 videos.

Barberis also creates electronic music.

== Music Video Awards & Nominations From The Following Organizations ==
- Canadian Country Music Association CCMA
- British Columbia Country Music Association BCCMA
- Western Canadian Music Award WCMA
- MuchMusic Video Awards MMVA
- Leo Awards LEO
- Alberta Recording Industries Association ARIA
- Saskatchewan Country Music Association SCMA
- Aboriginal Peoples Choice Awards APCA
- Canadian Aboriginal Music Awards CAMA
- Country Music Association Of Ontario CMAO

== See also ==
- Music videos directed by Stephano Barberis
