= Big & Rich discography =

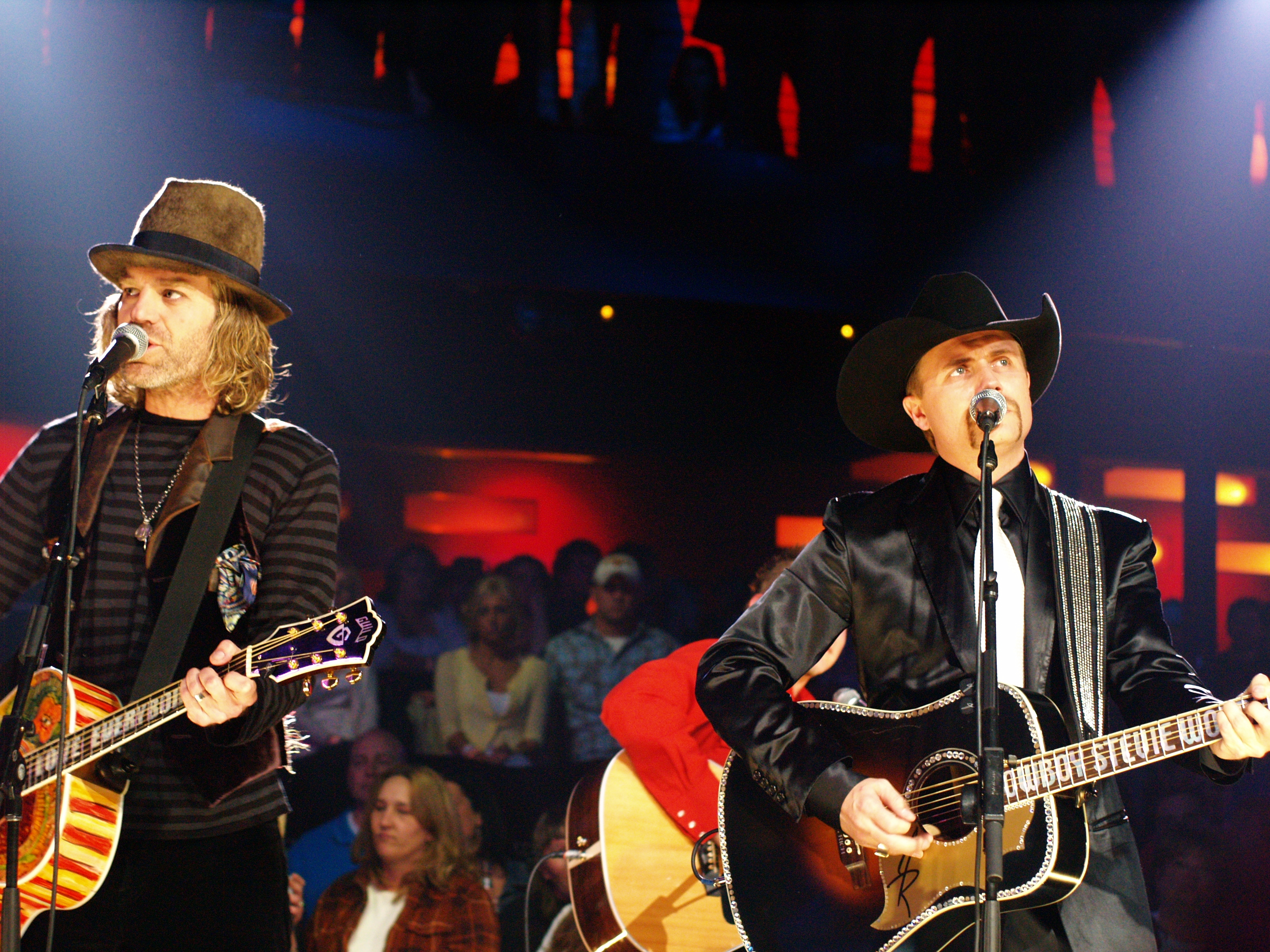
- Big Kenny and John Rich
- Studio albums: 6
- Extended plays: 7
- Compilation albums: 3
- Singles: 20
- Music videos: 20
- Other charted singles: 3
- No. 1 singles: 1

Big & Rich is an American country music duo founded by Big Kenny and John Rich. Signed to Warner Bros. Records in 2004, the duo has released six studio albums, five extended plays, two extended play/DVD combos, three compilation albums and 20 singles. Their 2004 debut, Horse of a Different Color, is also their highest-selling album, certified 3× Platinum by the Recording Industry Association of America (RIAA) and gold by the Canadian Recording Industry Association (CRIA). 2005's Comin' to Your City is certified platinum by the RIAA, and 2007's Between Raising Hell and Amazing Grace is certified gold by the same. Their first EP/DVD combo, Big & Rich's Super Galactic Fan Pak, is also certified platinum.

Of Big & Rich's singles, sixteen have charted on Billboard Hot Country Songs or Country Airplay, with all but four reaching Top 40 or higher. They have had two Top Ten hits: "Lost in This Moment", a number one country hit; and "Look at You".

== Studio albums ==
Title	Details	Peak chart positions			Certifications (sales threshold)
Title	Details	US Country	US	US Indie	Certifications (sales threshold)
Horse of a Different Color	Release date: May 4, 2004; Label: Warner Bros. Nashville; Formats: CD, music download	1	6	—	MC: Gold; RIAA: 3× Platinum
Comin' to Your City	Release date: November 15, 2005; Label: Warner Bros. Nashville; Formats: CD, music download	3	7	—	RIAA: Platinum
Between Raising Hell and Amazing Grace	Release date: June 5, 2007; Label: Warner Bros. Nashville; Formats: CD, music download	1	6	—	RIAA: Gold
Hillbilly Jedi	Release date: September 18, 2012; Label: Warner Bros. Nashville; Formats: CD, music download	4	25	—	
Gravity	Release date: September 23, 2014; Label: Big & Rich Records; Formats: CD, music download	8	51	10	
Did It for the Party	Release date: September 15, 2017; Label: Big & Rich Records/Thirty Tigers; Formats: CD, music download	2	9	1	
"—" denotes releases that did not chart

== Extended plays ==
Title	Details	Peak chart positions		Certifications (sales threshold)
Title	Details	US Country	US	Certifications (sales threshold)
Big & Rich's Super Galactic Fan Pak	Release date: October 26, 2004; Label: Warner Bros. Nashville; Formats: CD, music download	17	90	RIAA: Platinum
Rolling Stone Original	Release date: November 2005; Label: Warner Bros. Nashville; Formats: Rhapsody exclusive download	—	—	
Walmart Soundcheck	Release date: January 1, 2007; Label: Warner Bros. Nashville; Formats: Walmart exclusive download	—	—	
Rhapsody Originals	Release date: June 2007; Label: Warner Bros. Nashville; Formats: Rhapsody exclusive download	—	—	
Unplugged at Studio 330	Release date: September 2007; Label: Warner Bros. Nashville; Formats: Music download	—	—	
Big & Rich's Super Galactic Fan Pak 2	Release date: September 30, 2008; Label: Warner Bros. Nashville; Formats: CD, music download	54	—	
That's Why I Pray (Note: Contains the single "That's Why I Pray" along with "Save a Horse (Ride a Cowboy)", "Comin' to Your City" and "Lost in This Moment".)	Release date: June 26, 2012; Label: Warner Bros. Nashville; Formats: Walmart exclusive CD	48	—	
"—" denotes releases that did not chart

== Compilation albums ==
Title	Details	Peak chart positions	
Title	Details	US Country	US
Greatest Hits	Release date: September 29, 2009; Label: Warner Bros. Nashville; Formats: CD, music download	27	148
Greatest Hits (Note: Despite having the same title as the 2009 release, the 2014 Greatest Hits release has a completely different track listing and cover art, so it is effectively a different release altogether.)	Release date: November 10, 2014; Label: Warner Bros. Nashville; Formats: CD, music download	—	—
Save a Horse: The Warner Singles Collection	Release date: October 30, 2020; Label: Warner Bros. Nashville; Formats: music download	—	—
"—" denotes releases that did not chart

== Singles ==
=== 2000s ===
Year	Single	Peak chart positions							Certifications (sales threshold)	Album
Year	Single	US Country	US	US Pop	US AC	AUS	CAN	GER	Certifications (sales threshold)	Album
2003	"Wild West Show"	21	85	—	—	—	—	—		Horse of a Different Color
2004	"Save a Horse (Ride a Cowboy)"	11	56	—	—	68	—	87	RIAA: 2× Platinum; MC: Gold; RMNZ: Platinum	Horse of a Different Color
2004	"Holy Water"	15	75	—	—	—	—	—		Horse of a Different Color
2005	"Big Time"	20	— (Note: "Big Time" did not enter the Billboard Hot 100, but peaked at number 3 on the Bubbling Under Hot 100 Singles chart.)	—	—	—	—	—		Horse of a Different Color
2005	"Comin' to Your City"	21	72	62	—	—	—	—		Comin' to Your City
2006	"Never Mind Me"	34	—	—	—	—	—	—		Comin' to Your City
2006	"8th of November" (Note: "8th of November" charted from unsolicited airplay before being confirmed as a single in mid-2006.)	18	94	—	—	—	—	—		Comin' to Your City
2007	"Lost in This Moment"	1	36	45	12	—	45	—	RIAA: Platinum	Between Raising Hell and Amazing Grace
2007	"Between Raising Hell and Amazing Grace"	37	—	—	—	—	—	—		Between Raising Hell and Amazing Grace
2007	"Loud"	42	—	—	—	—	—	—		Between Raising Hell and Amazing Grace
"—" denotes releases that did not chart

=== 2010s & 2020s ===
Year	Single	Peak chart positions					Certifications	Album
Year	Single	US Country	US Country Airplay	US	CAN Country	CAN	Certifications	Album
2011	"Fake I.D." (with Gretchen Wilson)	47		—	—	—	RMNZ: Gold	Footloose (soundtrack)
2012	"That's Why I Pray"	16		82	—	—		Hillbilly Jedi
2012	"Party Like Cowboyz"	—	57	—	—	87		Hillbilly Jedi
2013	"Cheat On You"	—	59	—	—	—		Hillbilly Jedi
2014	"Look at You"	13	7	73	23	99	RIAA: Gold	Gravity
2015	"Run Away with You"	17	11	— (Note: "Run Away with You" did not enter the Hot 100, but peaked at number 2 on the Bubbling Under Hot 100 Singles chart.)	—	—		Gravity
2016	"Lovin' Lately" (featuring Tim McGraw)	19	14	— (Note: "Lovin' Lately" did not enter the Hot 100, but peaked at number 20 on the Bubbling Under Hot 100 Singles chart.)	—	—		Gravity
2017	"California"	32	20	—	—	—		Did It for the Party
2018	"Brand New Buzz"	—	—	—	—	—		Gravity
2020	"Stay Home"	—	49	—	—	—		Non-album single
"—" denotes releases that did not chart

== Other singles ==
=== Other charted songs ===
Year	Single	Peak positions	Album
Year	Single	US Country	Album
2005	"Our America" (with Gretchen Wilson and Cowboy Troy)	44	Comin' to Your City
2005	"8th of November"	58	Comin' to Your City
2007	"You Shook Me All Night Long"	59	Between Raising Hell and Amazing Grace

=== Guest singles ===
Year	Single	Artist(s)	Peak chart positions			Album
Year	Single	Artist(s)	US Country	US Bubbling	US Pop	Album
2005	"I Play Chicken with the Train"	Cowboy Troy	48	18	81	Loco Motive
2005	"My Last Yee Haw"	Cowboy Troy	—	—	—	Loco Motive
2006	"That's How They Do It in Dixie"	Hank Williams, Jr. (with Gretchen Wilson and Van Zant)	35	—	—	That's How They Do It in Dixie: The Essential Collection
2006	"Live Forever"	Billy Joe Shaver	—	—	—	The Real Deal
2012	"Shake It"	The Lacs	—	—	—	190 Proof
2017	"Good Ole Days"	Tracy Lawrence (with Brad Arnold)	—	—	—	Good Ole Days
"—" denotes releases that did not chart

== Videography ==
=== Music videos ===
Year	Video	Director
2004	"Wild West Show"	
2004	"Save a Horse (Ride a Cowboy)"	David Hogan
2005	"Holy Water"	Deaton-Flanigen/Marc Oswald
2005	"Big Time"	Deaton-Flanigen/Marc Oswald
2005	"Comin' to Your City"	Jeff Richter
2006	"8th of November"	Deaton-Flanigen
2007	"Lost in This Moment"	Deaton-Flanigen
2007	"Between Raising Hell and Amazing Grace"	Deaton-Flanigen
2011	"Fake I.D." (with Gretchen Wilson)	
2012	"That's Why I Pray"	Kristin Barlowe
2012	"Party Like Cowboyz"	The Edde Brothers
2012	"Lay It All on Me"	Kip Kubin
2012	"Born Again"	Ryan Hamblin
2012	"Cheat on You"	Jeff Venable
2014	"Look at You"	Trey Fanjoy
2015	"Lovin' Lately" (featuring Tim McGraw)	Trey Fanjoy
2015	"Gravity"	Trey Fanjoy
2015	"Brand New Buzz"	Trey Fanjoy
2015	"Run Away with You"	Lloyd Aur Norman
2017	"California"	PR Brown

=== Guest appearances ===
Year	Video	Director
2006	"That's How They Do It in Dixie" (Hank Williams, Jr. with Gretchen Wilson and Van Zant)	Deaton-Flanigen
2006	"Live Forever" (Billy Joe Shaver)	Rick Schroder
2012	"Shake It" (The Lacs)	Potsy Ponciroli
2018	"Good Ole Days" (Tracy Lawrence with Brad Arnold)	Shaun Silva
