= Greatest Hits (Big & Rich album) =

Greatest hits album by Big & Rich
- Released: September 29, 2009
- Genre: Country
- Length: 55:44
- Label: Warner Bros. Nashville
- Producer: Big Kenny, John Rich, Paul Worley

Big & Rich chronology
Big & Rich's Super Galactic Fan Pak 2 (EP) (2008)	Greatest Hits (2009)	That's Why I Pray (EP) (2012)

Professional ratings
Review scores
Source	Rating
Allmusic	(mixed)
Roughstock	(favorable)

Greatest Hits is the first compilation album by American country music duo Big & Rich. The album was released on September 29, 2009. The standard album features fifteen songs, including all of the duo's charting singles from their first three studio albums: 2004's Horse of a Different Color, 2005's Comin' to Your City and 2007's Between Raising Hell and Amazing Grace. A previously unreleased track, titled "The Man I Am Right Now," was also included. The DVD, which was released separately, features all of the duo's music videos, with the exception of the video for "Never Mind Me."

BigAndRich.com, the duo's official site, sold an exclusive limited-edition version of the album which included the CD and DVD in a single package as well as bonus tracks on the CD.

== Track listings ==
No.	Title	Writer(s)	Length
1.	"Rollin' (The Ballad of Big & Rich)" (featuring Cowboy Troy)	Big Kenny, John Rich, Cowboy Troy	4:31
2.	"Wild West Show"	Kenny, Rich, Blair Daly	4:00
3.	"Save a Horse (Ride a Cowboy)"	Kenny, Rich	3:20
4.	"Holy Water"	Kenny, Rich, Vicky McGehee, Jeff Cohen	4:16
5.	"Big Time"	Kenny, Rich, Angie Aparo	3:57
6.	"Comin' to Your City"	Kenny, Rich	3:28
7.	"Never Mind Me"	Kenny, Rich, Rodney Clawson	3:25
8.	"8th of November"	Kenny, Rich	3:29
9.	"Lost in This Moment"	Rich, Keith Anderson, Clawson	3:32
10.	"Between Raising Hell and Amazing Grace"	Kenny, Earl James	3:43
11.	"Loud"	Kirsti Manna, Darla Perlozzi, Danny Myrick	3:02
12.	"Jalapeño"	Rich	2:57
13.	"The Man I Am Right Now"	McGehee, Rich	3:25
14.	"Everybody's Rockin"	Kenny	3:19
15.	"Kick My Ass"	Kenny, Rich, Bryan Wayne	4:58
Total length:			55:44

Limited Edition
No.	Title	Writer(s)	Length
16.	"Find a Heart"	Kenny, Richard Supa	3:38
17.	"Woodstock"	Kenny	2:40
18.	"Save a Horse (Ride a Cowboy)" (remix)	Kenny, Rich	4:23
Total length:			65:41

=== 2014 release ===
No.	Title	Writer(s)	Length
1.	"Save a Horse (Ride a Cowboy)"	Kenny; Rich	3:19
2.	"Holy Water"	Kenny; Rich; Cohen; McGehee	4:14
3.	"Big Time"	Kenny; Rich; Aparo	3:56
4.	"Comin' to Your City"	Kenny; Rich	3:26
5.	"8th of November"	Kenny; Rich	3:26
6.	"Lost in This Moment"	JRich; Anderson; Clawson	3:30
7.	"Rollin' (The Ballad Of Big & Rich)"	Kenny; Rich; Troy	4:50
8.	"Fake ID"	Rich; Shanks	3:18
9.	"Love Train"	Kenny; Rich; Nicholson	3:45
10.	"Party Like Cowboyz"	Kenny; Rich; McGehee; Clawson	2:58
Total length:			36:42

=== DVD ===
No.	Title	Length
1.	"Rollin' (The Ballad of Big & Rich)"
2.	"Wild West Show"
3.	"Save a Horse (Ride a Cowboy)"
4.	"Holy Water"
5.	"Big Time"
6.	"Comin' to Your City"
7.	"8th of November"
8.	"Lost in This Moment"
9.	"Between Raising Hell and Amazing Grace"

== Chart performance ==
Chart (2009)	Peak position
U.S. Billboard Top Country Albums	27
U.S. Billboard 200	148
