= List of songs written by John Rich =

This is an alphabetical list of songs written or co–written by American songwriter John Rich.

"Song" – Artist(s) (co–writers)

== 0–9 ==
- "8th of November" – Big & Rich (Big Kenny)
- "20 Maragaritas" – Big & Rich (Big Kenny)

== A ==
- "Ain't Broke Yet" – Cowboy Troy (Big Kenny, Cowboy Troy)
- "Ain't Gonna Stop" – James Otto (Big Kenny, James Otto, Nikki Sixx)
- "All Jacked Up" – Gretchen Wilson (Gretchen Wilson)
- "Amarillo Sky" – McBride & the Ride, Jason Aldean (Big Kenny, Rodney Clawson, Bart Pursley)
- "Another You" – John Rich (Marv Green)
- "Attitude" – Wynonna Judd (Wynonna Judd)
- "Automatic" – Cowboy Troy (Cowboy Troy, Adam Shoenfeld)

== B ==
- "The Bed" – Gretchen Wilson with Big & Rich (Keith Anderson, Vicky McGehee)
- "Big Al's Buffalo Club Medley" – Big & Rich (Big Kenny)
- "Big Man" – Shannon Brown (Shannon Brown, Vicky McGehee)
- "Big Time" – Big & Rich (Big Kenny, Angie Aparo)
- "Breaking Your Heart" – Cheyenne Kimball (Cheyenne Kimball, Vicky McGehee)
- "Brown Liquor" – John Anderson (John Phillips, Shannon Lawson)

== C ==
- "California Girls" – Gretchen Wilson (Gretchen Wilson, Mark Wright)
- "Can't Do It Today" – Gary Allan (Rodney Clawson, Vicky McGehee)
- "Caught Up in the Moment" – Big & Rich (Big Kenny)
- "Come Cryin' to Me" – Lonestar (Mark D. Sander TV s, Wally Wilson)
- "Come to Bed" – Gretchen Wilson with John Rich (Vicky McGehee)
- "Comin' to Your City" – Big & Rich (Big Kenny)
- "Corn Fed" – Shannon Brown (Shannon Brown, Vicky McGehee)
- "Comin' Back for You" – Keith Harling (Chris Waters, Tom Shapiro)
- "Country Done Come to Town" – John Rich (Vicky McGehee)
- "Crazy Nights" – Lonestar (Chris Waters, Tom Shapiro)
- "Crick in My Neck" – Cowboy Troy with Big & Rich (Cowboy Troy)

== D ==
- "Deadwood Mountain" – Big & Rich (Big Kenny)
- "Does Your Daddy Know About Me" – Lonestar (Larry Boone, Paul Nelson)
- "Drink & Dial" – James Otto (Vicky McGehee, James Otto)
- "Drinkin' 'bout You" – Big & Rich (Big Kenny)
- "Drive Myself to Drink" – John Rich (Vicky McGehee, James Otto)

== E ==
- "El Tejano" – Cowboy Troy (Cowboy Troy)
- "End of The World" - John Rich (Tom Macdonald)
- "Everybody Wants to Be Me" – John Rich (Vicky McGehee)

== F ==
- "The Faster I Go" – David Kersh (Larry Boone, Paul Nelson
- "Filthy Rich" – Big & Rich (Big Kenny, Bill McDavid, Freddy Powers, Sonny Throckmorton)
- "For the Kids" – John Rich
- "The Freak Parade" – Big & Rich (Big Kenny)
- "Funky Country" – John Anderson (John Anderson)

== G ==
- "The Good Lord and the Man" – John Rich
- "Good Ole Boy" – Gretchen Wilson (Vicky McGehee, Gretchen Wilson)
- "Good Ole Days" – Shannon Brown (Blair Daly, Shane Mack)

== H ==
- "Here for the Party" – Gretchen Wilson
- "Hick Chick" – Cowboy Troy with Angela Hacker (Cowboy Troy)
- "Hicktown" – Jason Aldean (Big Kenny, Vicky McGehee)
- "High Five" – Big & Rich (Big Kenny, Adam Shoenfeld)
- "High Horses" – Shannon Brown (Blair Daly, Julian Bunetta)
- "Holy Water" – Big & Rich (Big Kenny, Vicky McGehee, Jeff Cohen)
- "Hook 'em Horns" – Cowboy Troy (Big Kenny, Cowboy Troy)

== I ==
- "I Can't Make Her Cry Anymore" – John Anderson (Shannon Lawson, John Anderson)
- "I Confess" – Randy Owen (James Otto, Randy Owen)
- "I Don't Want to Lose Your Love" – John Rich (Vicky McGehee)
- "I Love 'em All" – Shannon Brown (Shannon Brown, Vicky McGehee)
- "I Love the Way You Do That" – Lonestar (Don Cook, Wally Wilson)
- "I Love You Like That" – John Rich (Big Kenny, Rodney Clawson)
- "I Play Chicken with the Train" – Cowboy Troy with Big & Rich (Angie Aparo, Cowboy Troy)
- "I Pray for You" – Big Kenny, John Rich, Big & Rich (Big Kenny)
- "I Thought You'd Never Ask" – John Rich (John Anderson)
- "I'm Just a Man" – Jason Aldean (Chad Brock, Vicky McGehee)
- "If Her Lovin' Don't Kill Me" – Aaron Tippin, John Anderson (Vicky McGehee, Tim Womack)
- "If You Don't Wanna Love Me" – Cowboy Troy with Sarah Buxton (Cowboy Troy)

== J ==
- "Jalapeño" – Big & Rich (Big Kenny)
- "John Doe on a John Deere" – Lonestar (Don Cook, Conley White)
- "Johnny Cash" – Tracy Byrd, Jason Aldean
- "Joyce Is My Choice" – Big & Rich (Big Kenny)

== K ==
- "Kick My Ass" – Big & Rich (Big Kenny, Bryan Wayne)
- "Kill Me Now" – Rio Grand (Anthony L. Smith, Vicky McGehee)

== L ==
- "Leap of Faith" – Big & Rich (Big Kenny)
- "Let's Pretend We're Strangers For the Night" – Randy Owen (Shannon Lawson, Randy Owen)
- "Like We Never Loved at All" – Faith Hill with Tim McGraw (Vicky McGehee, Scot Sax)
- "Live This Life" – Big & Rich with Martina McBride (Big Kenny)
- "Lock Me Up" – Cowboy Troy with Angela Hacker and John Rich (Cowboy Troy, Max Abrams)
- "Lost in This Moment" – Big & Rich, Keith Anderson (Rodney Clawson, Keith Anderson)
- "Love Train" – Big & Rich (Big Kenny, Jon Nicholson)
- "Love Won't Listen" – John Rich (Sharon Vaughn, L. David Lewis)

== M ==
- "Mack Truck" - John Rich with Kid Rock (Adam Shoenfeld)
- "Man with the Microphone" – Cowboy Troy (Cowboy Troy)
- "Mississippi Girl" – Faith Hill (Adam Shoenfeld)
- "My Last Yee Haw" – Cowboy Troy with Big & Rich (Big Kenny, Cowboy Troy)

== N ==
- "Never Been Down" – Big & Rich (Big Kenny)
- "Never Mind Me" – Big & Rich (Big Kenny, Rodney Clawson)
- "New Jerusalem" – John Rich (Jim Rich, Chris Waters, Tom Shapiro)
- "No One Can Love You Anymore" – Randy Owen (Randy Owen, Vicky McGehee)
- "Not Bad for a Bartender" – Gretchen Wilson (Vicky McGehee, Gretchen Wilson)

== O ==
- "Old Blue Mountain" – John Rich (Big Kenny)
- "Once a Woman Gets a Hold of Your Heart" – Heartland (Richie McDonald)
- "One Bud Wiser" – Gretchen Wilson (Vicky McGehee)
- "Our America" – Big & Rich with Gretchen Wilson and Cowboy Troy (traditional; arranged by John Rich, Big Kenny, Gretchen Wilson, Paul Worley)

== P ==
- "Paranoid Like Me ('Tis the Season of Discontent)" – Cowboy Troy (Cowboy Troy)
- "Pickin' Wildflowers" – Keith Anderson (Keith Anderson, Kim Williams)
- "Please Man" – Big & Rich with Wyclef Jean (Wyclef Jean)
- "Pocahontas Proud" – Gretchen Wilson (Vicky McGehee, Gretchen Wilson)

== R ==
- "Raining on Me" – Gretchen Wilson (Vicky McGehee, Gretchen Wilson)
- "Real World" – Big & Rich (Big Kenny, Adam Shoenfeld)
- "Redneck Woman" – Gretchen Wilson (Gretchen Wilson)
- "Revelation" - John Rich
- "Rollin' (The Ballad of Big & Rich)" – Big & Rich with Cowboy Troy (Big Kenny, Cowboy Troy)

== S ==
- "Save a Horse (Ride a Cowboy)" – Big & Rich (Big Kenny)
- "Saved" – Big & Rich (Big Kenny, John Phillips)
- "Say When" – Lonestar (Larry Boone, Paul Nelson)
- "She Brings the Lightning Down" – John Rich, Shannon Brown (Vicky McGehee)
- "She Doesn't Know She's Got It" – Blake Shelton (Chris Waters, Tom Shapiro)
- "She's a Butterfly" – Martina McBride with Big & Rich, John Rich (Big Kenny)
- "Shut Up About Politics" – John Rich with The Five
- "Shuttin' Detroit Down" – John Rich (John Anderson)
- "Simplify" - John Rich (Big Kenny, Brian Wayne Galentine)
- "Six Foot Town" – Big & Rich (Big Kenny)
- "Skoal Ring" – Gretchen Wilson (Vicky McGehee, Gretchen Wilson)
- "Slow Motion" – Big & Rich (Big Kenny)
- "Someday" – John Rich (Big Kenny)
- "Something to Believe In" – John Rich (Big Kenny, Rodney Clawson)
- "Son of a Preacher Man" – John Rich (Vicky McGehee)
- "Soul Shaker" – Big & Rich (Big Kenny, Rodney Clawson)
- "Steel Bridges" – John Rich (Sharon Vaughn, Jonnie Most)
- "Stomp" – Crossin Dixon (Rodney Clawson, Blair Daly)
- "Sunset Man" – James Otto (Shannon Lason, James Otto)
- "Sunshine and Summertime" – Faith Hill (Rodney Clawson, Kylie Sackley)

== T ==
- "Texas" - John Rich with Cowboy Troy (Adam Shoenfeld)
- "There Goes the Neighborhood" – Gretchen Wilson (Vicky McGehee, Gretchen Wilson)
- "Three Chord Country & American Rock & Roll" – Keith Anderson (Keith Anderson)
- "Trucker Man" – John Rich (Vicky McGehee)
- "Turn a Country Boy On" – John Rich (Vicky McGehee)
- "Turn to Me" – Shannon Brown (Gretchen Wilson, Vicky Mcgehee)

== U ==
- "Unbreakable" – Katrina Elam (Katrina Elam, Vicky McGehee)
- "Underneath the Same Moon" – John Rich, Blake Shelton (Sharon Vaughn, L. David Lewis)

== W ==
- "The Way I Loved You" – Taylor Swift (Taylor Swift)
- "We Got It Going On" – Bon Jovi with Big & Rich (Big Kenny, Jon Bon Jovi, Richie Sambora)
- "What Do We Do With the Rest of the Night" – Lonestar (Sharon Rice, Wally Wilson)
- "When I Think About Cheatin'" – Gretchen Wilson (Vicky McGehee, Gretchen Wilson)
- "When It Rains" – Gretchen Wilson (Vicky McGehee, Gretchen Wilson)
- "Who's Kissing You Tonight" – Jason Aldean (Tom Shapiro, Chris Waters)
- "Whoop Whoop" – Cowboy Troy (Vicky McGehee, Cowboy Troy)
- "Why" – Shannon Brown, Jason Aldean (Rodney Clawson, Vicky McGehee)
- "Why Does Somebody Always Have to Die" – John Rich (Vicky McGehee)
- "Wild West Show" – Big & Rich (Big Kenny, Blair Daly)
- "A Woman Knows" – John Anderson (Vicky McGehee, Julie Roberts)
- "Wrap Around" – Keith Anderson (Keith Anderson, Kim Williams)
- "Wrap Around the World" – Cowboy Troy with Big & Rich (Cowboy Troy)

== Y ==
- "You Don't Have to Go Home" – Gretchen Wilson (Vicky McGehee, Gretchen Wilson)
- "You Had Me From Hell No" - John Rich with Lil Jon (Kylie Sackley)
- "You Never Stop Loving Somebody" – Big & Rich (Big Kenny)
- "You're the Love I Wanna Be In" – Jason Aldean (Jason Aldean, Vicky McGehee)
- "You Rock Me" - John Rich (Adam Shoenfeld)
