= Big & Rich's Super Galactic Fan Pak 2 =

EP with bonus DVD by Big & Rich
- Released: September 30, 2008
- Genre: Country
- Length: 9:38
- Label: Warner Bros. Nashville
- Producer: Big & Rich, Paul Worley

Big & Rich chronology
Unplugged at Studio 330 (EP) (2007)	Big & Rich's Super Galactic Fan Pak 2 (2008)	Greatest Hits (2009)

Professional ratings
Review scores
Source	Rating
Allmusic	1.5/5 stars
Country Weekly	3/5 stars

Big & Rich's Super Galactic Fan Pak 2 is the second EP and DVD set released by the American country music duo Big & Rich. The compilation, released in late 2008, is a follow-up to their 2004 EP/DVD combo Big & Rich's Super Galactic Fan Pak. This set is composed of a three-song CD and a live DVD featuring a full-length concert.

Big Kenny later included "Find a Heart" as "To Find a Heart" on his 2009 solo album The Quiet Times of a Rock and Roll Farm Boy.

== Track listing ==
=== EP ===
No.	Title	Writer(s)	Length
1.	"Woodstock"	Big Kenny	2:40
2.	"Everybody's Rockin'"	Big Kenny	3:21
3.	"Find a Heart"	Big Kenny, Richard Supa	3:37
Total length:			9:38

=== DVD (Live) ===
No.	Title	Length
1.	"Radio"
2.	"Comin' to Your City"
3.	"Wild West Show"
4.	"Love Train"
5.	"Lost in This Moment"
6.	"Between Raising Hell and Amazing Grace"
7.	"Big Time"
8.	"Just Got Started Lovin' You" (featuring James Otto)
9.	"Holy Water"
10.	"8th of November"
11.	"Jalapeño"
12.	"Loud"
13.	"Save a Horse (Ride a Cowboy)"
14.	"Rollin' (The Ballad of Big & Rich)" (featuring Cowboy Troy)

== Chart performance ==
Chart (2008)	Peak position
U.S. Billboard Top Country Albums	54
