= Hillbilly Jedi =

Studio album by Big & Rich
- Released: September 18, 2012
- Genres: Country; alternative country; country rock; country pop
- Length: 45:48
- Labels: Warner Bros. Nashville; Warner Music Group
- Producer: Dann Huff

Big & Rich chronology
That's Why I Pray (2012)	Hillbilly Jedi (2012)	Gravity (2014)

Singles from Hillbilly Jedi
- 1. "That's Why I Pray" Released: May 21, 2012; 2. "Party Like Cowboyz" Released: December 3, 2012; 3. "Cheat On You" Released: January 22, 2013

Professional ratings
Review scores
Source	Rating
Allmusic	2.5/5 stars
Country Music Rocks	(favorable)
Country Standard Time	(favorable)
Country Weekly	(favorable)
Great American Country	(favorable)
Recording Connection	1.5/5 stars
Roughstock	3/5 stars
Slant	1.5/5 stars

Hillbilly Jedi is the fourth studio album by American country music duo Big & Rich, released on September 18, 2012. It is the duo's first new studio album since Between Raising Hell and Amazing Grace in 2007. The album's lead-off single, "That's Why I Pray," was released on May 21, 2012 and was followed by two more singles, "Party Like Cowboyz" and "Cheat On You." Hillbilly Jedi received mixed reviews from critics.

== Overview ==
In 2008, just a year after the duo released Between Raising Hell and Amazing Grace, John Rich announced that the duo would be going on hiatus so that Big Kenny could recuperate from an old injury. Both members released solo songs during this period before reuniting in mid-2011 to release the single "Fake ID" for the Footloose soundtrack and began to tour. Later that year, the duo announced plans for a new album. Shortly after the release of "That's Why I Pray," Rich went on record as saying that he felt that the song could be the biggest of the duo's career.

Alphin said that the album's title "came out in a writing session we were doing with Richie Sambora and Jon Bon Jovi the other week. They are going to record the song on our new album and a line in the song was "hillbilly jedis with attitude." All of a sudden, Bon Jovi stops and says, "Hillbilly Jedis? That’s it. I’d buy that shirt." We were like, "Hey, that’s about a descriptive as you can get of what we are."" Bon Jovi was instrumental in securing the album's title, even going so far as to call George Lucas to ask for permission once the group realized that the word "jedi" was copyrighted.

== Critical reception ==
Reviews for Hillbilly Jedi have generally been mixed. Stephen Thomas Erlewine of Allmusic ended his review by stating "Hillbilly Jedi merely raises one question: weren't Big & Rich better off following their own paths?" In his review for Slant Magazine, Jonathan Keefe mentioned that "the only thing noteworthy about the album is that George Lucas allowed Big & Rich to refer to themselves as Jedis" while Rob Burkhardt, in a similarly negative review, mentioned that the album is "just a recycling of an old schtick, a feeble attempt to revive a party everyone already went home from. And it doesn’t go over well."

Country-focused reviewers have been much more positive. Daryl Addison, in his review for GAC, stated that "on Hillbilly Jedi, the duo is back with a masterful set that is refreshed, renewed and re-focused. Just like they announced on their debut, it’s a celebration of music and it’s great to have them back." Echoing the tone of the former, Country Music Rocks stated that "There is something for everyone on Hillbilly Jedi" while Dan MacIntosh of Country Standard Time similarly stated that "This album is truly good, and that's no Jedi mind trick." Joseph Hudak was positive in his review for Country Weekly, declaring that "Hillbilly Jedi stands as Big & Rich’s strongest and most inspired album since Horse of a Different Color. Entertained Yoda would be." In his modestly positive review for Roughstock, Marc Erickson stated that "if you've never been a fan of their music, chances are you will not become one now as the Hillbilly Jedi are leading a freak parade that never was meant to be 100% wholly mainstream."

== Commercial performance ==
"That's Why I Pray" debuted at number 24 on the Country charts, the highest debut achieved by a duo since the charts were first tabulated by Nielsen BDS in 1990. The album sold about 17,000 copies in its first week.

== Track listing ==
No.	Title	Writer(s)	Length
1.	"Born Again" (featuring Bon Jovi)	Big Kenny, John Rich, Richie Sambora, Jon Bon Jovi	3:57
2.	"Party Like Cowboyz (Galactic Version)"	Kenny, Rich, Rodney Clawson, Vicky McGehee	3:35
3.	"That's Why I Pray"	Danelle Leverett, Blair Daly, Sarah Buxton	4:12
4.	"Lay It All On Me"	Kenny, Adam Shoenfeld, Judson Spence	4:22
5.	"Last Words"	Rich, Sharon Vaughn	2:59
6.	"Rock the Boat" (featuring Cowboy Troy)	Rich, Cowboy Troy, Craig Wiseman	4:04
7.	"Can't Be Satisfied"	Rich, Kenny, Bon Jovi, Sambora	4:07
8.	"Get Your Game On (Unleash The Beast Version)" (featuring Cowboy Troy)	Kenny, Eric Paslay, Coleman	3:32
9.	"'Cause I Play Guitar"	Rich, Kenny, Garrett Miller	3:33
10.	"Cheat On You"	Rich, Amanda Watkins, Kasey Buckley	3:15
11.	"Never Far Away"	Rich, Kenny	4:24
12.	"M-E-D-L-E-Y Of The Hillbilly Jedi"	Rich, Kenny, Shoenfeld, John Phillips, Freddy Powers, Bill McDavid	5:48
Total length:			45:48

== Personnel ==
Big and Rich

- Big Kenny – vocals, hi-string acoustic guitar
- John Rich – vocals

Additional Musicians

- Jon Bon Jovi – vocals on "Born Again"
- Tom Bukovac – electric guitar, soloist
- Nicole Burt – choir
- Sarah Buxton – background vocals
- J.T. Corenflos – electric guitar
- Cowboy Troy – rap on "Rock the Boat" and "Get Your Game On"
- Eric Darken – percussion
- Paul Franklin – steel guitar
- Althea Layne Hamilton – choir
- Steve Hermann – trumpet
- Mark Hill – bass guitar
- Jim Hinchey – trombone
- Jim Hoke – clarinet, harmonica
- Dann Huff – bouzouki, dobro, electric guitar, keyboards, mandolin, slide guitar, soloist, synthesizer
- Charlie Judge – keyboards, piano, upright piano, string pads, strings, synthesizer
- Chris McHugh – drums
- Matt Menefee – banjo
- Garrett Miller – acoustic guitar
- Greg Morrow – drums, percussion
- Megan Mullins – background vocals
- Danny Rader – banjo, bouzouki, acoustic guitar
- Richie Sambora – electric guitar, soloist, and background vocals on "Born Again"
- Adam Shoenfeld – acoustic guitar, electric guitar, soloist
- Jimmie Lee Sloas – bass guitar
- Christopher C. Smith – choir
- Russell Terrell – background vocals
- Ilya Toshinsky – acoustic guitar, electric guitar
- Jonathan Yudkin – cello, fiddle, mandolin, string arrangements, strings, violin, viola

== Chart performance ==
=== Album ===
Chart (2012)	Peak position
US Billboard 200	25
US Billboard Top Country Albums	4

=== Singles ===
Year	Single	Peak chart positions			
Year	Single	US Country	US Country Airplay	US	CAN
2012	"That's Why I Pray"	16	—	82	—
2012	"Party Like Cowboyz"	—	57	—	87
2013	"Cheat On You"	—	59	—	—
"—" denotes releases that did not chart
