= Big & Rich's Super Galactic Fan Pak =

EP with bonus DVD by Big & Rich
- Released: October 24, 2004
- Recorded: 2004
- Genre: Country
- Length: 27:21
- Label: Warner Bros. Nashville
- Producer: John Rich, Paul Worley

Big & Rich chronology
Horse of a Different Color (2004)	Big & Rich's Super Galactic Fan Pak (2004)	Comin' to Your City (2005)

Big & Rich's Super Galactic Fan Pak is an EP/DVD combination released by the country music duo Big & Rich on October 24, 2004. The album debuted on the country charts at No. 17, and the Billboard 200 at No. 90. Although it produced no chart singles, the album was certified platinum by the RIAA.

== Track listing ==
All songs are from Horse of a Different Color unless otherwise noted.

=== EP ===
1. "Save a Horse (Ride a Cowboy)" (dance mix) (Big Kenny, John Rich) (4:23)
2. "Never Been Down"^{A} (Kenny, Rich) (3:23)
3. "Drinkin' 'Bout You" (acoustic version) (Kenny, Rich) (8:50)
4. "The Bob Song"^{A, B, E} (Kenny) (6:49)
5. "Save a Horse (Ride a Cowboy)" (live version) (3:54)

=== DVD ===
1. "Rollin' (The Ballad of Big & Rich) (Kenny, Rich)
2. "Six Foot Town" (Kenny, Rich)
3. "Real World" (Kenny, Rich, Adam Shoenfeld)
4. "Deadwood Mountain (Kenny, Rich)
5. "Kick My Ass" (Kenny, Rich, Bryan Wayne)
6. "Love Train" (Kenny, Rich, John Nicholson)
7. "Holy Water" (Kenny, Rich, Vicky McGehee, Jeff Cohen)
8. "Joyce Is My Choice"^{A} (Kenny, Rich)
9. "Wild West Show" (Kenny, Rich, Blair Daly)
10. "Big Al's Buffalo Club Medley"
  - "Disco Ball"^{C}
  - "Limo Larry"^{A}
  - "Say Ooh"^{A}
  - "Chair Ride"^{A}
  - "Blow My Mind"^{D} (Kenny)

Notes:

- ^{A} Song not included on any Big & Rich studio album.
- ^{B} Later recorded by Willie Nelson on his album Moment of Forever.
- ^{C} Later included as a bonus track on the iTunes release of Between Raising Hell and Amazing Grace.
- ^{D} Later included on Comin' to Your City.
- ^{E} Later included on Big Kenny's Love Everybody Traveling Musical Medicine Show Mix Tape, Vol. 1.

== Chart performance ==
Chart (2004)	Peak position
U.S. Billboard Top Country Albums	17
U.S. Billboard 200	90

== Certifications ==
Region	Certification
United States (RIAA)	Platinum
