= Loco Motive (album) =

2005 album by Cowboy Troy

Studio album by Cowboy Troy
- Released: May 17, 2005
- Studios: Blackbird (Nashville, Tennessee); Sony ATV (Nashville, Tennessee)
- Genre: Country rap
- Label: Raybaw/Warner Bros. Records Nashville
- Producers: Cowboy Troy; John Rich; Paul Worley

Cowboy Troy chronology
Vintage (2003)	Loco Motive (2005)	Black in the Saddle (2007)

Loco Motive is an album by American country rap musician Cowboy Troy. Released in 2005 as his first album for Warner Bros. Records, it features the single "I Play Chicken with the Train" and "If You Don't Wanna Love Me", respectively recorded in collaboration with Big & Rich and Sarah Buxton.

== Content ==
The album features a variety of collaborations among the MuzikMafia, a singer-songwriter collective of which Cowboy Troy was a member at the time. Among those featured are Big & Rich, James Otto, and Adam Shoenfeld. Sarah Buxton also provides duet vocals on "If You Don't Wanna Love Me".

Lead single "I Play Chicken with the Train" reached number 48 on Billboard Hot Country Songs and number 18 on the Bubbling Under Hot 100 Singles chart in mid-2005. "If You Don't Wanna Love Me" was the album's second single, released in June 2005.

== Critical reception ==
Professional ratings
Review scores
Source	Rating
Allmusic	2/5 stars
Country Standard Time	(favorable)

Stephen Thomas Erlewine rated the album two out of five stars, criticizing Troy's flow as an "extended Wayne Brady skit." He also wrote that Troy "cranks out plodding, heavy-handed, self-aggrandizing rhymes, tripping over his words and never modulating his intonation or volume...[t]his makes for terrible music, but it's the kind of terrible music that you can't wait to play for other people." Country Standard Time reviewer Robert Loy was generally favorable toward the album, noting that songs such as "Ain't Broke Yet" and "If You Don't Wanna Love Me" "cover situations rappers and rednecks both face". He also considered Troy to have a sense of humor, and thought "Somebody's Smilin' on Me" was the most country-sounding due to its use of fiddle. Kevin John Coyne of Country Universe reviewed "If You Don't Wanna Love Me" favorably, stating that "Buxton’s voice interacts perfectly with the lyric...the roots of those old spoken country records are surfacing more prominently than any hip-hop roots here."

== Track listing ==
1. "I Play Chicken with the Train" (Angie Aparo, John Rich, Troy Coleman) – 3:16
  - featuring Big & Rich
2. "Crick in My Neck" (Rich, Coleman) – 3:20
3. "Ain't Broke Yet" (Big Kenny, Rich, Coleman) – 4:09
  - featuring Big & Rich
4. "If You Don't Wanna Love Me" (Rich, Coleman) – 5:24
  - featuring Sarah Buxton
  - spoken word intro to "My Last Yee Haw": Larry the Cable Guy
5. "My Last Yee Haw" (Big Kenny, Rich, Coleman) – 3:27
  - featuring Big & Rich
6. "El Tejano" (Rich, Coleman) – 3:36
7. "Somebody's Smilin' on Me" (Brett Warren, Brad Warren, Coleman) – 4:01
  - featuring Tim McGraw and Big Kenny
8. "Do Your Thang" (John Phillips, Coleman, Jill Kinsey) – 3:35
  - featuring Jill Kinsey
9. "Beast on the Mic" (Adam Shoenfeld, Coleman) – 3:26
  - featuring James Otto
10. "Whoop Whoop" (Vicky McGehee, Rich, Coleman) – 3:10
  - featuring Jon Nicholson
11. "Automatic" (Shoenfeld, Rich, Coleman) – 4:23
  - featuring ATOM
12. "Wrap Around the World" (Rich, Coleman) – 3:50
  - featuring Big & Rich

== Personnel ==
- Paul Allen - electric guitar (except 7 and 11), acoustic guitar (7, 11)
- ATOM - guest vocals (11)
- Brian Barnett - drums (all tracks), percussion (2, 3, 7, 8, 10, 11)
- Big & Rich - guest vocals (1, 3, 5)
- Big Kenny - background vocals (2, 8, 12), guest vocals (7)
- Joan Bush - background vocals (6)
- Sarah Buxton - guest vocals (4)
- Dan Dugmore - lap steel guitar (6), Dobro (8, 10)
- Larry Franklin - fiddle (1, 3)
- Mike Johnson - pedal steel guitar (2, 4, 5, 7, 11, 12)
- Jill Kinsey - guest vocals (8)
- Randy Kohrs - Dobro (2, 9, 11)
- Larry the Cable Guy - "words of encouragement" (4)
- Liana Manis - background vocals (4)
- Tim McGraw - guest vocals (7)
- Jon Nicholson - guest vocals (10), background vocals (12)
- James Otto - guest vocals (9)
- James Pennebaker - electric guitar (1, 4, 8)
- Ethan Pilzer - bass guitar (all tracks)
- John Rich - acoustic guitar (1, 3, 4, 8, 9, 12), background vocals (2, 6, 8, 9, 12)
- Michael Rojas - piano (2–7, 9–12) synthesizer (3, 4, 9, 11), Farfisa (5), Hammond B-3 organ (7, 12)
- Adam Shoenfeld - electric guitar (all tracks)
- Paul Worley - background vocals (6)
- Jonathan Yudkin - banjo (1, 2, 12), fiddle (2, 5, 6, 7, 9, 11, 12), strings (4, 7, 10), mandolin (12)

Technical

- Matt Beale - mastering assistant
- Paige Connors - production coordination
- Cowboy Troy - producer
- Adam Engelhardt - recording assistant
- Paul Hart - recording, recording assistant
- Andrew Mendelson - mastering
- Bartley Pursley - recording, mixing
- Lowell Reynolds - recording assistant, mixing assistant
- John Rich - producer
- David Robinson - recording assistant
- Clarke Schleicher - recording
- Paul Worley - producer
- Jonathan Yudkin - string arrangement (4, 7, 10)

== Charts ==
=== Weekly charts ===
Chart (2005)	Peak position
US Billboard 200	15
US Top Country Albums (Billboard)	2
US Top Rap Albums (Billboard)	13

=== Year-end charts ===
Chart (2005)	Position
US Top Country Albums (Billboard)	45
