= Black in the Saddle =

2007 album by Cowboy Troy

Studio album by Cowboy Troy
- Released: June 5, 2007
- Genre: Country rap, nu metal
- Label: Raybaw/Warner Bros.
- Producer: Cowboy Troy; John Rich (credited as J. Money)

Cowboy Troy chronology
Loco Motive (2005)	Black in the Saddle (2007)	Demolition Mission: Studio Blue Sessions (2009)

Professional ratings
Review scores
Source	Rating
Allmusic -	3/5 stars
Country Standard Time	(favorable)

Black in the Saddle is an album by American country rapper Cowboy Troy. It is his second major-label album, released in 2007 on Warner Bros. Records. None of the album's singles entered the Billboard singles charts.

As with his previous album Loco Motive, this album features several guest musicians, including fellow MuzikMafia members Big & Rich and James Otto. Angela Hacker, a 2007 winner on the talent competition Nashville Star, is also featured on the tracks "Lock Me Up" and "Hick Chick".

== Track listing ==
1. "Buffalo Stampede" (Troy Coleman, Brian Nutter) – 4:05
  - feat. M. Shadows of Avenged Sevenfold
2. "Lock Me Up" (Coleman, John Rich, Max Abrams) – 2:59
  - feat. John Rich (as J. Money) and Angela Hacker
3. "How Can You Hate Me?" (Coleman, Adam Shoenfeld) – 3:51
4. "Take Your Best Shot Now" (Coleman, Michael Bradford) – 4:05
5. "Hick Chick" (Coleman, Rich) – 3:43
  - feat. Angela Hacker
6. "Man with the Microphone" (Coleman, Rich) – 4:18
7. "My Bowtie" (Coleman, Bobby Pinson) – 2:57
8. "Cruise Control" (Coleman, Bob DiPiero) – 3:47
  - feat. James Otto
9. "Paranoid Like Me ('Tis the Season of Discontent)" (Coleman, Rich) – 5:10
10. "Blackneck Boogie" (Coleman) – 3:05
11. "Hick Chick" (dance mix) (Coleman, Rich) – 3:46
12. "I Play Chicken with the Train" (Barn Dance mix) (Coleman, Rich, Angie Aparo) – 4:17
  - feat. Big & Rich

=== Personnel ===
As listed in liner notes.

==== Tracks 1–11 ====
- Paul Allen – electric guitar, acoustic guitar
- Jeff Armstrong – synthesizer
- Sara Beck – background vocals
- Larry Babb – drums
- Steve Brewster – drums, shaker
- Mike Brignardello – bass guitar
- Gary Burnette – electric guitar
- Joeie Canaday – bass guitar
- Randy Kohrs – lap steel guitar, Dobro
- James Pennebaker – pedal steel guitar
- John Rich (as J. Money) – background vocals
- Jeffery Roach – synthesizers, keyboards, piano, timpani
- Michael Rojas – keyboards, Hammond B–3 organ
- Adam Shoenfeld – electric guitar, acoustic guitar
- Glenn Worf – bass guitar
- Jonathan Yudkin – fiddle, banjo, mandolin, strings
- M.Shadows – vocals on "Buffalo Stampede"

==== Track 12 ====
- Paul Allen – electric guitar
- Brian Barnett – drums
- Larry Franklin – fiddle
- James Pennebaker – electric guitar
- Ethan Pilzer – bass guitar
- John Rich (as J. Money) – harmony vocals, acoustic guitar
- Adam Shoenfeld – electric guitar
- Jonathan Yudkin – fiddle

== Chart performance ==
Chart (2007)	Peak position
U.S. Billboard Top Country Albums	28
U.S. Billboard 200	153
