= Underneath the Same Moon =

Studio album by John Rich
- Released: March 14, 2006
- Recorded: 1999
- Genre: Country
- Label: BNA/Legacy
- Producer: John Rich, Sharon Vaughn

John Rich chronology
Rescue Me (2001)	Underneath the Same Moon (2006)	Son of a Preacher Man (2009)

Singles from Underneath the Same Moon
- 1. "I Pray for You" Released: July 24, 2000

Professional ratings
Review scores
Source	Rating
Allmusic	2/5 stars

Underneath the Same Moon is the second solo studio album recorded by John Rich. The album was recorded in 1999, after Rich departed from the country group Lonestar and before he joined Big Kenny in the duo Big & Rich. However, like Big Kenny's 1999 album Live a Little, this album was not released until 2006, after Big & Rich had released their first album. Rich also self-released an album in 2001, Rescue Me, though it was recorded after Underneath the Same Moon.

"I Pray for You" was a chart single on the Hot Country Songs charts for Rich in 2000, peaking at number 53. Kenny also recorded the song on Live a Little, and as Big & Rich, they would record the song again for their 2005 album Comin' to Your City.

== Critical reception ==
Stephen Thomas Erlewine of Allmusic gave the album two stars out of five, saying that it was "predictable, polished, and safe" in comparison to his works in Big & Rich, but said that "New Jerusalem" was "the most distinctive song" on the album.

== Track listing ==
No.	Title	Writer(s)	Length
1.	"I Pray for You"	John Rich, Kenny Alphin	3:58
2.	"Underneath the Same Moon"	John Rich, Sharon Vaughn, L. David Lewis	3:51
3.	"Old Blue Mountain"	John Rich, Alphin	3:15
4.	"She Brings the Lightnin' Down"	John Rich, Vicky McGehee	3:06
5.	"I Love You Like That"	John Rich, Alphin, Rodney Clawson	3:28
6.	"When You Love Someone"	Gretchen Peters, Michael Kamen, Bryan Adams	3:30
7.	"Steel Bridges"	John Rich, Vaughn, Jonnie Most	4:58
8.	"Something to Believe In"	John Rich, Alphin, Clawson	4:13
9.	"Someday"	John Rich, Alphin	3:14
10.	"Love Won't Listen"	John Rich, Vaughn, Lewis	3:38
11.	"New Jerusalem" (spoken word introduction by Rich's father, Jim Rich; features The Fairfield Four)	John Rich, Jim Rich, Chris Waters, Tom Shapiro	2:24
12.	"(untitled hidden track)"		5:03

== Personnel ==
- Kenny Alphin - background vocals
- Steve Brewster - drums, drum loops
- Gary Burnette - electric guitar
- Dennis Burnside - piano, synthesizer, Hammond B-3 organ
- John Catchings - cello
- Melodie Crittenden - background vocals
- Eric Darken - percussion
- Jay Dawson - bagpipes
- Sara Evans - background vocals
- The Fairfield Four - background vocals on "New Jerusalem"
- Pat Flynn - acoustic guitar, mandolin
- Shannon Forrest - drums
- Wes Hightower - background vocals
- Mike Johnson - pedal steel guitar
- Liana Manis - background vocals
- Delbert McClinton - background vocals
- Michael Rhodes - bass guitar
- Jim Rich - spoken word on "New Jerusalem"
- John Rich - lead vocals, background vocals, acoustic guitar
- Darrell Scott - acoustic guitar, classical guitar
- Benmont Tench - piano, Hammond B-3 organ
- Sharon Vaughn - background vocals
- Kristin Wilkinson - viola, violin
- John Willis - acoustic guitar, mandolin, classical guitar
- Glenn Worf - bass guitar

== Chart performance ==
=== Album ===
Chart (2006)	Peak position
U.S. Billboard Top Country Albums	64

=== Singles ===
Year	Single	Peak chart positions	
Year	Single	US Country	CAN Country
1999	"I Pray for You"	53	63
