= If You Don't Wanna Love Me =

"If You Don't Wanna Love Me" may refer to

- "If You Don't Wanna Love Me", by Tamar Braxton on the 2000 album Tamar
- "If You Don't Wanna Love Me", by Cowboy Troy and Sarah Buxston on the 2005 album Loco Motive
- "If You Don't Wanna Love Me", by James Morrison on the 2009 album Songs for You, Truths for Me
