= Horse of a Different Color (Big & Rich album) =

Studio album by Big & Rich
- Released: May 4, 2004
- Studio: Dark Horse Recording Studio
- Genre: Country
- Length: 56:52
- Label: Warner Bros. Nashville
- Producer: Big Kenny; John Rich; Paul Worley

Big & Rich chronology
Horse of a Different Color (2004)	Big & Rich's Super Galactic Fan Pak (EP) (2004)

Singles from Horse of a Different Color
- 1. "Wild West Show" Released: December 15, 2003; 2. "Save a Horse (Ride a Cowboy)" Released: April 19, 2004; 3. "Holy Water" Released: September 20, 2004; 4. "Big Time" Released: February 7, 2005

Professional ratings
Review scores
Source	Rating
Allmusic	4/5 stars
Entertainment Weekly	B+
The Guardian	0/5 stars

Horse of a Different Color is the debut studio album by American country music duo Big & Rich, released on May 4, 2004, by Warner Bros. Nashville. The album contains the hit singles "Wild West Show", "Save a Horse (Ride a Cowboy)", "Holy Water", and "Big Time". Respectively, these reached No. 21, No. 11, No. 15, and No. 20 on the Billboard Hot Country Songs charts. The album was certified 3× Platinum by the RIAA for shipments of three million copies.

== Content ==
Horse of a Different Color features several guest musicians, primarily members of the MuzikMafia, the collaborative singer-songwriter group that Big & Rich founded. Country rap artist Cowboy Troy is featured on the lead-off track "Rollin' (The Ballad of Big & Rich)", and makes an uncredited guest appearance at the end of "Kick My Ass". Gretchen Wilson provides background vocals on "Saved", and Jon Nicholson on "Love Train". The only guest musician who is not a MuzikMafia member is Martina McBride, who provides backing vocals on the final track, "Live This Life". Big Kenny and John Rich, who comprise the duo, co-wrote all the tracks on the album, and co-produced it with Paul Worley.

Four singles were released from this album. Lead-off single "Wild West Show" peaked at No. 21 on the Billboard country charts in early 2004. Following it was "Save a Horse (Ride a Cowboy)", which peaked at No. 11 and was certified platinum by the RIAA as a single. The third single release, the No. 15 "Holy Water", was inspired by Big Kenny's and John Rich's sisters, both victims of domestic abuse. "Big Time" was the final single, reaching No. 20 in mid-2005.

== Track listing ==
All tracks are written by Big Kenny and John Rich, with additional co-writers as noted.

No.	Title	Writer(s)	Length
1.	"Rollin' (The Ballad of Big & Rich)" (featuring Cowboy Troy)	Cowboy Troy	4:50
2.	"Wild West Show"	Blair Daly	4:20
3.	"Big Time"	Angie Aparo	3:56
4.	"Kick My Ass" (featuring Cowboy Troy -uncredited)	Bryan Wayne	4:58
5.	"Six Foot Town"		3:47
6.	"Holy Water"	Vicky McGehee; Jeff Cohen	4:13
7.	"Saved" (background vocals: Gretchen Wilson)	John Phillips	4:51
8.	"Real World"	Adam Shoenfeld	5:05
9.	"Save a Horse (Ride a Cowboy)"		3:20
10.	"Drinkin' 'bout You"		2:53
11.	"Love Train" (background vocals: Jon Nicholson)	Jon Nicholson	3:47
12.	"Deadwood Mountain"		5:10
13.	"Live This Life" (background vocals: Martina McBride)		5:33
Total length:			56:52

== Personnel ==
As listed in liner notes.

Big & Rich

- Big Kenny - vocals
- John Rich - vocals, acoustic guitar

Additional musicians

- Brian Barnett - drums (4–9, 11), tambourine (6, 7)
- Steve Brewster - drums (12), shaker (12)
- Dennis Burnside - keyboards (2, 9, 11)
- Cowboy Troy - "multilingual 'hick-hop' rap" (1), vocals (4)
- Owen Hale - drums (10)
- Mike Johnson - steel guitar (1–8,11,12)
- Wayne Killius - drums (1–3,13), shaker (2), peanut can (2), tambourine (13)
- Martina McBride - background vocals (13)
- Duncan Mullins - bass guitar (2)
- Jon Nicholson - background vocals (11)
- Matt Pierson - bass guitar (1,3–8,10–13)
- Michael Rojas - keyboards (1,3–8,10–13)
- Adam Shoenfeld - electric guitar
- Nicole Summers - flute (2)
- Justin Tocket - bass guitar (9)
- Gretchen Wilson - background vocals (7)
- Paul Worley - "yeehaw juice" (4)
- Jonathan Yudkin - fiddle (1,3,4,7,8,9,11,12), banjo (1,8,9,12), strings (1,6,7,13), string composer (1,6,7,13), string arrangements (1,6,7,13), mandolin (6,7), harp (7)

Technical

- Richard Dodd - mastering
- Big Kenny - production
- Bart Pursley - recording, mixing
- John Rich - production
- Paul Worley - production

== Chart performance ==
=== Weekly charts ===
Chart (2004)	Peak position
US Billboard 200	6
US Top Country Albums (Billboard)	1

=== Year-end charts ===
Chart (2004)	Position
US Billboard 200	45
US Top Country Albums (Billboard)	5
Worldwide Albums (IFPI)	44
Chart (2005)	Position
US Billboard 200	42
US Top Country Albums (Billboard)	9
Chart (2006)	Position
US Top Country Albums (Billboard)	51

=== Singles ===
Year	Single	Peak chart positions			Certifications (sales threshold)
Year	Single	US Country	US	GER	Certifications (sales threshold)
2003	"Wild West Show"	21	85	—	
2004	"Save a Horse (Ride a Cowboy)"	11	56	87	CAN: Gold; US: Platinum
2004	"Holy Water"	15	75	—	
2005	"Big Time"	20	103	—	
"—" denotes releases that did not chart

== Certifications ==
Region	Certification
Canada (Music Canada)	Gold
United States (RIAA)	3× Platinum
