= Long After I'm Gone =

Single by Big Kenny

from the album The Quiet Times of a Rock and Roll Farm Boy
- Released: August 18, 2009
- Recorded: 2009
- Genre: Country
- Length: 3:32
- Label: Glotown/Love Everybody/Bigger Picture Music Group
- Songwriters: Big Kenny, Marc Beeson, Richard Supa
- Producers: Big Kenny, Chris Stone

Big Kenny singles chronology
"Long After I'm Gone" (2009)	"To Find a Heart" (2010)

"Long After I'm Gone" is a song co-written and recorded by American country music artist Big Kenny, one-half of the duo Big & Rich. The song was released to country radio on August 18, 2009, as his debut single as a solo artist, where it debuted at number 57 on the U.S. Billboard Hot Country Songs chart that week. It is the lead-off single to his second studio album, The Quiet Times of a Rock and Roll Farm Boy, which was released on November 10, 2009, via Love Everybody/Bigger Picture. Big Kenny wrote this with Marc Beeson and Richard Supa.

== Content ==
"Long After I'm Gone" is a mid-tempo where the male narrator looks back on his life, stating a desire to leave behind a legacy of love.

== Critical reception ==
Juli Thanki of The9513 gave the song a thumbs-up. She said Big Kenny is practicing what he preaches in the lyrics about leaving love as a legacy, and that it's having a positive impact, also saying, "Big & Rich may have legions of adoring fans, but if this is the music representative of what Kenny Alphin can release as a solo artist, then he might just be better off staying away from his bandmate." Bobby Peacock of Roughstock gave a favorable review, saying that the lyrics used "overused platitudes" but that Kenny "injects charisma and passion into every single line. It's very easy to tell that he believes what he's singing[.]"

== Music video ==
A music video was released in August 2009, directed by Christian Holiday and Big Kenny. This video was shot at Big Kenny's house.

== Chart performance ==
"Long After I'm Gone" debuted at number 57 on the U.S. Billboard Hot Country Songs chart for the chart week of August 18, 2009. It has since become his first solo Top 40 hit peaking at number 34 in November 2009.

Chart (2009)	Peak position
US Hot Country Songs (Billboard)	34
