= Live a Little (Big Kenny album) =

Studio album by Big Kenny
- Released: March 1, 2005
- Recorded: 1999
- Genre: Rock, pop
- Length: 47:28
- Label: Hollywood
- Producer: Big Kenny, Gary Burnette

Big Kenny chronology
Live a Little (2005)	The Quiet Times of a Rock and Roll Farm Boy (2009)

Professional ratings
Review scores
Source	Rating
AllMusic	4/5 stars

Live a Little is the first solo album by American singer Big Kenny, prior to his joining John Rich in the duo Big & Rich. Recorded in 1999 for Hollywood Records, the album was not released until 2005, after Big & Rich had released their debut album. Its release coincided with the release of Rich's previously unreleased debut album Underneath the Same Moon, also recorded in 1999 and released in 2006. Unlike Kenny's work within the country music genre with Big & Rich, Live a Little is a mixture between rock and pop. This album was followed by The Quiet Times of a Rock and Roll Farm Boy in 2009 and Big Kenny's Love Everybody Traveling Musical Medicine Show Mix Tape, Vol. 1 in 2010.

The track "I Pray for You" (listed here as "Pray for You") was also recorded by Rich on Underneath the Same Moon, and was a minor chart single for him in 2000. Kenny re-recorded the song in 2005 with Rich for their second album as a duo, Comin' to Your City.

== Track listing ==
No.	Title	Writer(s)	Length
1.	"Candy Colored Glasses"	Big Kenny, Jaime Hanna	3:57
2.	"Under the Sun"	Big Kenny, Bill Maher	3:50
3.	"Cheater's Lament"	Big Kenny	3:16
4.	"Thinkin' Too Much"	Big Kenny, Austin Cunningham	4:18
5.	"Long Long Way"	Big Kenny, Cunningham	4:20
6.	"Think About It"	Big Kenny, Maher	4:35
7.	"Trip"	Big Kenny, John Rich	3:27
8.	"Rather Be"	Big Kenny	4:52
9.	"Last to Know"	Big Kenny, Jennifer Kimball, Tommy Lee James	2:59
10.	"Pray For You"	Big Kenny, Rich	4:10
11.	"Outta Site"	Big Kenny, Rich, Gary Burnette	3:31
12.	"Rumba"	Big Kenny, Rory Lee Feek	4:13
Total length:			47:28

== Personnel ==
- Big Kenny – lead vocals, background vocals, acoustic guitar
- Steve Brewster – drums, drum loops, percussion
- Gary Burnette – electric guitar, acoustic guitar
- John Catchings – cello
- Tabitha Fair – background vocals
- Sam Hankins – background vocals
- Mark Hill – bass guitar ("Pray For You" and "Outta Site")
- Steve King – accordion
- Tony Miracle – synthesizers
- Randy Nations – electric guitar ("Cheater's Lament"), background vocals
- Matt Pierson – bass guitar
- John Rich – background vocals
- Jeffery Roach – piano, Hammond B-3 organ, Fender Rhodes, Wurlitzer, synthesizer
- Kristin Wilkinson – viola
