= Derek Murphy (musician) =

American drummer and session musician

Derek Murphy is an American drummer and session musician.

Early in his career, Derek Murphy was a part of Forget the Name and Milk Can in Miami. He performed on many recordings with artists such as Amanda Green, Beth Wood and Mary Karlzen and with engineer Tom Dowd. In 1999, Murphy moved to Atlanta and performed on the recording of "The American" with singer-songwriter, Angie Aparo and Grammy-winning producer Matt Serletic. Murphy has completed recordings with Angie Aparo, Teitur, Georgia, Aslyn (featuring the Muscle Shoals Rhythm Section, Tobias Froberg and Granville Automatic.

== Discography ==
- The American (1999)
- Weapon of Mass Construction (also released under the title "One With the Sun") (2001)
- For Stars and Moon (2003)
- 9live (2004)
