= The Quiet Times of a Rock and Roll Farm Boy =

Studio album by Big Kenny
- Released: November 10, 2009
- Recorded: 2009
- Genre: Country; alternative country; rock; pop
- Length: 77:04
- Label: Glotown Records/Love Everybody/Bigger Picture
- Producer: Big Kenny, Chris Stone, Paul Worley

Big Kenny chronology
Live a Little (2005)	The Quiet Times of a Rock and Roll Farm Boy (2009)	Big Kenny's Love Everybody Traveling Musical Medicine Show Mix Tape, Vol. 1 (2010)

The Quiet Times of a Rock and Roll Farm Boy is the second solo studio album by American country music artist Big Kenny, one-half of the duo Big & Rich. It was released on November 10, 2009, via Big Kenny's own Love Everybody label. The lead-off single, "Long After I'm Gone," has entered the Hot Country Songs chart and has become his first solo Top 40 on that chart. It was followed in 2010 by Big Kenny's Love Everybody Traveling Musical Medicine Show Mix Tape, Vol. 1, which was released exclusively through BigKenny.TV and BigSouthMusic.com. In 2011, a deluxe edition of Quiet Times was released on iTunes, featuring remixes, alternate versions, new transitions between tracks and a digital booklet.

== Content ==
The album's first single release is "Long After I'm Gone," which Big Kenny wrote with Marc Beeson and Richie Supa. His first single release outside Big & Rich, this song has also become his first Top 40 country hit. Big Kenny wrote or co-wrote all ten tracks on the album.

== Critical reception ==
In Billboard magazine, the album was described as "a thoughtful, often profound sojourn into musical independence." In his review of the track "Share The Love", Bill Friskics-Warren of The Washington Post said "As 'aw shucks' as some of it is, he's as sincere as he can be, and he imparts it all with such a pleasant, self-deprecating tenor that it's hard not to be warmed by the good vibes he's spreading." Bill Brotherton of Boston Herald gave the album a B+.

Stephen Thomas Erlewine of AllMusic gave the album one-and-a-half stars out of five, saying that it had "a stronger country bent" than his work in Big & Rich but adding that "it exists in a curious netherworld between genres, willfully eclectic without a unifying vision and lacking a focus given by hooks[…]unless you're on his wavelength — and can stomach his exaggerated crooning — it's a pretty alienating ride." Jonathan Keefe of Slant Magazine rated it three stars out of five, saying that it had "terrific, oddball flourishes" that "[mask] some of Kenny's more clichéd lyrical turns and thin vocals," but added that other songs showed stronger songwriting than Rich's Son of a Preacher Man album. Bobby Peacock gave a more favorable review on Roughstock, saying "The lyrics are lean and, while not terribly original, are far from cliché, and the constantly changing musical terrain only makes the whole album all the more engaging."

== Track listing ==
No.	Title	Writer(s)	Length
1.	"Wake Up"	Big Kenny, Brad Arnold, Jon Nicholson	3:55
2.	"Long After I'm Gone"	Big Kenny, Marc Beeson, Richard Supa	3:30
3.	"Be Back Home"	Big Kenny, Adam Shoenfeld, Judson Spence	3:17
4.	"Less Than Whole"	Big Kenny, Eric Paslay	4:23
5.	"Go Your Own Way"	Big Kenny, Ben Moody	3:44
6.	"To Find a Heart"	Big Kenny, Supa	3:37
7.	"Happy People"	Big Kenny, Nicholson	3:41
8.	"Drifter"	Big Kenny, Shawn Camp	3:54
9.	"Free Like Me"	Big Kenny	4:45
10.	"Share the Love"	Big Kenny	2:54
11.	"The Whole Experience"	Big Kenny, Arnold, Nicholson, Beeson, Supa, Shoenfield, Spence, Paslay, Moody, Camp	39:24
Total length:			77:04

The Whole Experience Deluxe Edition (Does not include track 11 from standard edition)
No.	Title	Writer(s)	Length
11.	"Wake Up" (Live at the Last Dollar Studio)	Big Kenny, Arnold, Nicholson	5:18
12.	"Less Than Whole" (Piano Version)	Big Kenny, Paslay	4:31
13.	"Long After I'm Gone" (Unplugged)	Big Kenny, Beeson, Supa	3:28
14.	"To Find a Heart" (Unplugged)	Big Kenny, Supa	4:04
Total length:			55:01

== Chart performance ==
Chart (2009)	Peak position
U.S. Billboard 200	197
U.S. Billboard Top Country Albums	37
