= Comin' to Your City =

Studio album by Big & Rich
- Released: November 15, 2005
- Recorded: 2005
- Genre: Country
- Length: 48:42
- Label: Warner Bros. Nashville, Warner Music Group
- Producer: Big Kenny, John Rich, Paul Worley

Big & Rich chronology
Big & Rich's Super Galactic Fan Pak (EP) (2004)	Comin' to Your City (2005)	Rolling Stone Original (EP) (2005)

Singles from Comin' to Your City
- 1. "Comin' to Your City" Released: September 12, 2005; 2. "Never Mind Me" Released: January 30, 2006; 3. "8th of November" Released: May 26, 2006

Professional ratings
Review scores
Source	Rating
AllMusic	4/5 stars
Entertainment Weekly	C−
Slant	3/5 stars

Comin' to Your City is the second studio album by American country music duo Big & Rich, released in 2005. It features the hit singles "Comin' to Your City", "Never Mind Me", and "8th of November", which peaked at number 21, number 34, and number 18 on the Hot Country Songs charts, respectively. Target offered an exclusive deluxe edition of the album which featured a bonus DVD of Big & Rich's performance at the 2005 CMA Music Festival.

The title track has become the official theme song of College Gameday, albeit with different lyrics that talk about specific college football teams. Cowboy Troy appears in the revamped version and the corresponding video. The track "I Pray for You" was one of the first songs which Big Kenny and John Rich wrote together. Prior to the duo's inception, both singers included it on their respective solo albums (Big Kenny's Live a Little and Rich's Underneath the Same Moon), which were both recorded in 1999, with the former released in 2005 and the latter in 2006. Rich's solo rendition was also released as a single in 2000, peaking at No. 58 on the country charts.

== Track listing ==
No.	Title	Writer(s)	Length
1.	"The Freak Parade"	Big Kenny, John Rich	1:09
2.	"Comin' to Your City"	Kenny, Rich	3:27
3.	"Soul Shaker"	Kenny, Rich, Rodney Clawson	3:05
4.	"Never Mind Me"	Kenny, Rich, Clawson	3:27
5.	"Caught Up in the Moment"	Kenny, Rich	3:42
6.	"Leap of Faith"	Kenny, Rich	4:58
7.	"I Pray for You"	Kenny, Rich	3:59
8.	"Filthy Rich"	Kenny, Rich, Bill McDavid, Freddy Powers, Sonny Throckmorton	3:09
9.	"Jalapeño"	Rich	2:58
10.	"20 Margaritas"	Kenny	2:48
11.	"Blow My Mind"	Kenny	3:35
12.	"Slow Motion"	Kenny, Rich	3:26
13.	"8th of November" (spoken intro: Kris Kristofferson)	Kenny, Rich	6:17
14.	"Our America" (guest vocals: Gretchen Wilson and Cowboy Troy)	Traditional, arr. by Big & Rich, Gretchen Wilson, Paul Worley	2:42
Total length:			48:42

In later presses of the album, "8th of November" was split into two tracks: one for Kris Kristofferson's opening and another for the song itself.

== Personnel ==
Big & Rich

- Big Kenny – vocals
- John Rich – vocals, acoustic guitar

Additional musicians

- Max Abrams – saxophone
- Sam Bacco – percussion (track 14)
- Brian Barnett – drums (all tracks except 4, 9, 10), percussion (track 3)
- Dennis Burnside – keyboards (track 2), synthesizer (track 5)
- Eric Darken – percussion (track 14)
- Mike Johnson – steel guitar
- Wayne Killius – drums (track 4, 9, 10)
- Howard Laravea – Hammond B-3 organ (track 4), synthesizer (track 4), piano (track 10)
- Carig Nelson – bass guitar (track 14)
- Matt Pierson – bass guitar (track 10)
- Mike Rojas – keyboards (track 1), piano (tracks 6, 8, 13), synthesizer (tracks 6, 11, 13), Hammond B-3 organ (track 11, 12), Wurlitzer (track 12)
- Ethan Pilzer – bass guitar (track 1, 3, 6, 7, 8, 11, 12, 13)
- Ron Sobro – percussion (track 14)
- Adam Shoenfeld – electric guitar (all tracks)
- Justin Tockett – bass guitar (track 2, 4, 5, 9)
- Paul Worley – electric guitar (tracks 1, 3, 6, 7, 11, 12, 13)
- Jonathan Yudkin – fiddle, banjo, mandolin, Dobro, cello, harp, octophone

Strings on Track 14 performed by the Nashville String Machine, conducted by Carl Gorodetzky, arranged by Dennis Burnside:

- Carl Gorodetzky, Pamela Sixfin, Conni Ellisor, Alan Umstead, David Davidson, David Angell, Catherine Umstead, Cate Myer, Zeneba Bowers, Erin Hall, Denise Baker, Carolyn Bailey, Gerald Greer, chris teal, Janet Askey, Karen Winkleman – violins
- Gary Vanosdale, Kathryn Plummer, Monisa Angell, Kris Wilkinson – violas
- John Catchings, Felix Wang, Sarighani Reist Acro – cellos

== Chart performance ==
=== Weekly charts ===
Chart (2005)	Peak position
US Billboard 200	7
US Top Country Albums (Billboard)	3

=== Year-end charts ===
Chart (2006)	Position
US Billboard 200	58
US Top Country Albums (Billboard)	16

=== Singles ===
Year	Single	Peak chart positions		
Year	Single	US Country	US	US Pop
2005	"Comin' to Your City"	21	72	62
2006	"Never Mind Me"	34	—	—
2006	"8th of November"	18	94	—
"—" denotes releases that did not chart

== Certifications ==
Region	Certification
United States (RIAA)	Platinum
