= That's Why I Pray =

Single by Big & Rich

from the album Hillbilly Jedi
- Released: May 21, 2012
- Genre: Country
- Length: 4:12
- Label: Warner Bros. Nashville
- Songwriters: Danelle Leverett; Blair Daly; Sarah Buxton
- Producer: Dann Huff

Big & Rich singles chronology
"Fake I.D." (2011)	"That's Why I Pray" (2012)	"Party Like Cowboyz" (2012)

"That's Why I Pray" is a song recorded by American country music duo Big & Rich. It was released in May 2012 as the first single from their album Hillbilly Jedi. The song was written by Danelle Leverett (formerly of The JaneDear girls and Gone West), Blair Daly and Sarah Buxton. An extended play of the same name was released on June 26, 2012 and featured the new single as well as three previously released songs.

== Content ==
"That's Why I Pray" is a mid-tempo song in which the narrators address social problems, saying that such problems are the reason that they pray.

== Critical reception ==
Matt Bjorke of Roughstock gave it a perfect five-star rating, praising Big & Rich's vocal harmonies and calling the song "well-crafted". Rating it three-and-a-half stars out of five, Jessica Nicholson of Country Weekly said that "The duo's airtight harmonies enhance the urgency in this well-crafted tune".

== Music video ==
The music video was directed by Kristin Barlowe and premiered on CMT on May 22, 2012.

== Chart performance ==
"That's Why I Pray" debuted at number 24 on the U.S. Billboard Hot Country Songs chart for the week of June 9, 2012.

Chart (2012)	Peak position
US Billboard Hot 100	82
US Hot Country Songs (Billboard)	16

=== Year-end charts ===
Chart (2012)	Position
US Country Songs (Billboard)	58
