= Big Time (Big & Rich song) =

Single by Big & Rich

from the album Horse of a Different Color
- Released: February 7, 2005
- Recorded: 2003
- Genre: Country
- Length: 3:56
- Label: Warner Bros. Nashville
- Songwriters: Big Kenny; John Rich; Angie Aparo
- Producers: Big Kenny; John Rich; Paul Worley

Big & Rich singles chronology
"Holy Water" (2004)	"Big Time" (2005)	"Comin' to Your City" (2005)

"Big Time" is a song co-written and recorded by American country music duo Big & Rich. It was released in February 2005 as the fourth and final single from their album Horse of a Different Color. The song was written by Big Kenny, John Rich and Angie Aparo.

== Content ==
The characters in the song are presumably a band performing a gig at a bar, singing toward a wealthier patron. They thank him for his generosity in providing various items that can be used by others, such as boats and planes. They ask, however, that he be generous when tipping for their performance. Whether or not they receive any money from him, however, they are in the "big time," relative to some in their current status.

== Music video ==
The video is set in and around Deadwood, South Dakota. At the start of the song, Kenny Alphin and John Rich are shown riding horses. They then are shown singing and playing guitar while sitting at the Moonshine Gulch Saloon in Rochford, South Dakota. A man in a cowboy hat walks in and they ask him for tip money; he refuses and walks on. They then perform a concert outside. The video premiered on CMT on April 25, 2005.

== Personnel ==
From Horse of a Different Color liner notes.

- Big Kenny - vocals
- Mike Johnson - steel guitar
- Wayne Killius - drums
- John Rich - vocals, acoustic guitar
- Michael Rojas - keyboards
- Adam Shoenfeld - electric guitar
- Jonathan Yudkin - fiddle

== Chart positions ==
"Big Time" debuted at number 52 on the U.S. Billboard Hot Country Singles & Tracks for the week of February 19, 2005.

Chart (2005)	Peak position
US Bubbling Under Hot 100 (Billboard)	3
US Hot Country Songs (Billboard)	20
