= Between Raising Hell and Amazing Grace =

Studio album by Big & Rich
- Released: June 5, 2007
- Genre: Country, country rock, country rap
- Length: 38:21
- Label: Warner Bros. Nashville, Warner Music Group
- Producer: Big Kenny, John Rich, Paul Worley

Big & Rich chronology
Walmart Soundcheck (EP) (2007)	Between Raising Hell and Amazing Grace (2007)	Rhapsody Originals (EP) (2007)

Singles from Between Raising Hell and Amazing Grace
- 1. "Lost in This Moment" Released: February 19, 2007; 2. "Between Raising Hell and Amazing Grace" Released: August 13, 2007; 3. "Loud" Released: November 19, 2007

Professional ratings
Review scores
Source	Rating
Allmusic	2/5 stars
Entertainment Weekly	C
Slant	1/5 stars

Between Raising Hell and Amazing Grace is the third studio album by American country music duo Big & Rich. It was released on June 5, 2007, by Warner Bros. Nashville. The album's lead-off single "Lost In This Moment," became the duo's first Number One single on the Hot Country Songs chart. Also released from this album were the title track and "Loud", which respectively peaked at No. 37 and No. 42 on the same chart. The latter was the first single of the duo's career not to reach Top 40.

Between Raising Hell and Amazing Grace debuted at number six on the U.S. Billboard 200 and at number one on the Billboard Top Country Albums chart, selling about 103,000 copies in its first week. As of August 25, 2007, the album has sold 325,577 copies in the US. A deluxe edition containing the album along with a live DVD of the Rhapsody Originals performance was offered as well as a Walmart exclusive edition which included a DVD of the duo's soundcheck session. A deluxe digital version was also offered.

The track "You Shook Me All Night Long" is a cover of the song of the same name by the Australian rock band AC/DC. "Lost in This Moment" was covered on Keith Anderson's second album, C'mon!.

== Track listing ==
No.	Title	Writer(s)	Length
1.	"Intro"		0:10
2.	"Lost in This Moment"	John Rich, Keith Anderson, Rodney Clawson	3:30
3.	"Between Raising Hell and Amazing Grace"	Big Kenny, Earl James	3:51
4.	"Faster Than Angels Fly"	Dobo Phillips, Billy Henderson	4:26
5.	"Eternity Intro" (featuring John Legend)		0:29
6.	"Eternity"	Kenny	3:18
7.	"When the Devil Gets the Best of Me"	Kenny, Adam Shoenfeld	3:18
8.	"Radio Intro"		1:03
9.	"Radio"	Kenny, Rich, Tebey Ottoh	3:47
10.	"You Never Stop Loving Somebody"	Kenny, Rich, Marcel	2:29
11.	"High Five"	Kenny, Rich, Shoenfeld	3:30
12.	"Please Man" (featuring Wyclef Jean)	Rich, Wyclef Jean	2:54
13.	"You Shook Me All Night Long"	Angus Young, Malcolm Young, Brian Johnson	2:43
14.	"Loud"	Kirsti Manna, Darla Perlozzi, Danny Myrick	3:02
Total length:			38:21

Deluxe Digital Version
No.	Title	Writer(s)	Length
15.	"Loud (Country Club Remix)" (featuring Lil Jon and Cowboy Troy)	Manna, Perlozzi, Myrick
16.	"Woodstock"	Kenny
17.	"Everybody's Rockin'"	Kenny

== Personnel ==
Big and Rich

- Big Kenny – vocals, string composer (6), string arrangements (6)
- John Rich – vocals, acoustic guitar (2,3,7,9,11), cymbal swells (4), percussion (4)

Additional Musicians

- Max Abrams – saxophone (14)
- Roy Agee – trombone (14)
- Larry Babb – tambourine (3)
- Steve Brewster – drums (3,4,6,10,12,13,14)
- Mike Brignardello – bass guitar (3,6)
- Pat Buchanan – electric guitar (11)
- Tom Bukovac – electric guitar (2,4,9,13,14)
- Gary Burnette – acoustic guitar (6), electric guitar (6)
- J.T. Corenflos – electric guitar (3,10,12)
- Eric Darken – percussion (7)
- Paul Franklin – steel guitar (3)
- Tommy Harden – drums (2,9), drum loop (2)
- Wes Hightower – background vocals (2,3,6,10,13)
- Wyclef Jean – vocals (12)
- Mike Johnson – steel guitar (2,6,11,14)
- Wayne Killius – drums (11)
- Marc Lacuesta – background vocals (6)
- Howard Laravea – keyboards (11)
- John Legend – vocals (5)
- Steve Patrick – trumpet (14)
- James Pennebaker – electric guitar (13)
- Matt Pierson – bass guitar (11)
- Ethan Pilzer – bass guitar (2,4,9,10,12,13,14)
- Mike Rojas – Hammond organ (2,3,10,12,14), piano (2,6,7,9,12,13), synthesizer (2,4,6)
- Adam Shoenfeld – acoustic guitar (12), electric guitar (2,3,4,6,7,9,10,11,12,13,14), solo (6)
- Kenneth "Scat" Springs – background vocals (6)
- Jonathan Yudkin – banjo (12), cello (2), fiddle (3,4,9,11,12,13,14), harp (7), mandolin (2,10,11), string composer (4,6,7), string arrangements (4,6,7), strings (4,6,7), violectra (3), viosynth (11)

== Chart performance ==
=== Weekly charts ===
Chart (2007)	Peak position
US Billboard 200	6
US Top Country Albums (Billboard)	1

=== Year-end charts ===
Chart (2007)	Position
US Billboard 200	117
US Top Country Albums (Billboard)	24
Chart (2008)	Position
US Top Country Albums (Billboard)	63

=== Singles ===
Year	Single	Peak chart positions					Certifications (sales threshold)
Year	Single	US Country	US	US Pop	US AC	CAN	Certifications (sales threshold)
2007	"Lost in This Moment"	1	36	45	12	45	US: Gold
2007	"Between Raising Hell and Amazing Grace"	37	—	—	—	—	
2007	"Loud"	42	—	—	—	—	
"—" denotes releases that did not chart

== Certifications ==
Region	Certification
United States (RIAA)	Gold
