= Save a Horse (Ride a Cowboy) =

Single by Big & Rich

from the album Horse of a Different Color
- Released: April 19, 2004
- Recorded: 2003
- Genre: Country; country rock
- Length: 3:20 (album version); 4:25 (dance mix)
- Label: Warner Bros. Nashville
- Songwriters: Big Kenny, John Rich
- Producers: Paul Worley, Big Kenny, John Rich

Big & Rich singles chronology
"Wild West Show" (2004)	"Save a Horse (Ride a Cowboy)" (2004)	"Holy Water" (2004)

"Save a Horse (Ride a Cowboy)" is a song written and recorded by American country music duo Big & Rich. It was released in April 2004 as the second single from their debut album Horse of a Different Color. It reached number 11 on the U.S. Billboard US Country chart. The song received wide exposure when ESPN featured the song in commercials for its coverage of the 2004 World Series of Poker. It was also featured in the Boston Legal episode "Death Be Not Proud".

Big & Rich also released a remixed dance version of the song which appeared on their compilation Big & Rich's Super Galactic Fan Pak. They performed this remixed version at the CMT Video Music Awards in 2005. The song was also featured in a Chevrolet commercial that was aired during Super Bowl XLI and the 49th Annual Grammy Awards.

The song appears on the game Karaoke Revolution Country, as well as in the 2012 film Magic Mike. The song also appears in the final episode of The Office.

== Content ==
The song is a fusion of country rock and country rap. The first two verses detail "Big" Kenny Alphin and John Rich's arrival into Nashville, going into a bar, "passing out hundred-dollar bills" and, "buying the bar a double round of Crown." They vow that Nashville is "never gonna be the same." They ride around Nashville on horses, while everyone else says to "save a horse" and "ride a cowboy."

== Music video ==
The music video for the song was filmed in Nashville during the summer of 2004. Big & Rich, other members of the MuzikMafia, including Gretchen Wilson and Cowboy Troy, as well as dancers, marching bands, and other groups of people, parade on the Shelby Street Bridge in Nashville. It was directed by David Hogan. The video caused damage to the bridge including dents and scuff marks, which cost $23,000 in repairs.

== One World Gear ==
In April 2007, the song was parodied by T-shirt manufacturer One World Gear, who began to offer a series of products on CafePress.com featuring variants of the slogan "Save a Horse, Ride a Cowboy", in which the word "cowboy" was replaced with the name of any one of 177 different nationalities, including "American". The version of the T-shirt featuring the slogan "Save a Horse, Ride a Taiwanese" was singled out as "racially discriminatory" and "insulting to Taiwan" by Taiwanese and Hong Kong media.

== Chart performance ==
"Save a Horse (Ride a Cowboy)" debuted at number 58 on the U.S. Billboard Hot Country Singles & Tracks for the week of April 24, 2004. It has sold 2.087 million copies as of April 2013.

== Personnel ==
From Horse of a Different Color liner notes.

- Brian Barnett – drums
- Big Kenny – vocals
- Dennis Burnside – keyboards
- John Rich – vocals, acoustic guitar
- Adam Shoenfeld – electric guitar
- Justin Tocket – bass guitar
- Jonathan Yudkin – fiddle, banjo

== Charts and certifications ==
=== Weekly charts ===
Chart (2004)	Peak position
Australia (ARIA)	68
Germany (GfK)	87
US Billboard Hot 100	56
US Hot Country Songs (Billboard)	11

=== Year-end charts ===
Chart (2004)	Position
US Country Songs (Billboard)	54

=== Certifications ===
Region	Certification	Certified units/sales
Canada (Music Canada)	Gold	10,000^{*}
New Zealand (RMNZ)	Platinum	30,000^{‡}
United States (RIAA)	2× Platinum	2,087,000
^{*} Sales figures based on certification alone.^{‡} Sales+streaming figures based on certification alone.
