= Lost in This Moment =

Single by Big & Rich

from the album Between Raising Hell and Amazing Grace
- Released: February 19, 2007
- Genre: Country; soft rock
- Length: 3:30
- Label: Warner Bros. Nashville
- Songwriters: Keith Anderson; Rodney Clawson; John Rich
- Producers: Big Kenny; John Rich; Paul Worley

Big & Rich singles chronology
"8th of November" (2006)	"Lost in This Moment" (2007)	"Between Raising Hell and Amazing Grace" (2007)

"Lost in This Moment" is a song written by John Rich, Keith Anderson and Rodney Clawson, and recorded by American country music duo Big & Rich. It was released in February 2007 as the first single from their album Between Raising Hell and Amazing Grace. The single became their first and only Number One hit on the Billboard country charts in July 2007. Prior to its release, the duo's highest-charting single was "Save a Horse (Ride a Cowboy)", which reached #11.

== Content ==
This song is sung from the perspective of a groom at his wedding. In the first verse, the bride walks down the aisle, where the groom and the preacher await. In the second verse, the couple exchange their vows, and the preacher pronounces the couple man and wife.

Keith Anderson, who co-wrote the song with Big & Rich's John Rich, also recorded the song. It is included on his second album, C'mon!, released on Columbia Records in August 2008.

== Music video ==
The video features Big & Rich, in tuxedos, singing the song, backed by their road band. On a projection screen behind them, various clips from various time periods of couples at their weddings are shown. The music video was directed by Deaton-Flanigen.

== Awards ==
On August 30, 2007, the single garnered two CMA Awards nominations, for Single of the Year (for the duo) and Song of the Year (for Rich, Anderson, and Rodney Clawson). The song was also nominated for Song of the Year, Single of the Year, and Music Video of the Year at the 2007 (awarded in 2008) ACM Awards.

== Chart performance ==
The song became the duo's first Number One hit for the week of July 21, 2007. A remixed version of the song also began receiving airplay on adult contemporary radio in July 2007 and debuted at #24 on the Hot Adult Contemporary Tracks chart on August 10, 2007. It has sold 990,000 copies in the US as of April 2013.

Chart (2007)	Peak position
Canada Hot 100 (Billboard)	45
US Billboard Hot 100	36
US Adult Contemporary (Billboard)	12
US Hot Country Songs (Billboard)	1

=== Year-end charts ===
Chart (2007)	Position
US Country Songs (Billboard)	6

== Certifications ==
Region	Certification	Certified units/sales
United States (RIAA)	Platinum	1,000,000^{‡}
^{‡} Sales+streaming figures based on certification alone.
