= Comin' to Your City (song) =

"Comin' To Your City"

Single by Big & Rich

from the album Comin' to Your City
- Released: September 5, 2005
- Recorded: 2005
- Genre: Country rock
- Length: 3:27
- Label: Warner Bros. Nashville
- Songwriters: Big Kenny; John Rich
- Producers: Big Kenny; John Rich; Paul Worley

Big & Rich singles chronology
"Big Time" (2005)	"Comin' To Your City" (2005)	"Never Mind Me" (2006)

"Comin' to Your City" is a song written and recorded by American country music duo Big & Rich. It was released in September 2005 as the lead single and title track from the album of the same name. The song reached number 21 on the U.S. Billboard Hot Country Singles & Tracks chart and number 72 on the Billboard Hot 100. The song was also used as theme song for The Sean Hannity Show. A version of "Comin' to Your City" is used as the theme song for ESPN's College GameDay, but the ESPN version has references to several college football teams in the lyrics which do not appear in the original song.

== Music video ==
The music video was directed by Jeff Richter, and was filmed in Los Angeles, California on August 15, 2005. The video premiered on CMT on September 15, 2005.

== Chart positions ==
"Comin' to Your City" debuted at number 52 on the U.S Billboard Hot Country Songs chart for the week of September 10, 2005.

Chart (2005)	Peak position
US Billboard Hot 100	72
US Hot Country Songs (Billboard)	21
