= 8th of November (song) =

Single by Big & Rich

from the album Comin' to Your City
- Released: May 26, 2006
- Recorded: 2005
- Genre: Country
- Length: 6:14 (original album version, with spoken intro); 4:58 (album version, without spoken intro); 3:28 (radio edit)
- Label: Warner Bros. Nashville
- Songwriters: Big Kenny, John Rich
- Producers: Paul Worley, Big Kenny, John Rich

Big & Rich singles chronology
"Never Mind Me" (2006)	"8th of November" (2006)	"Lost in This Moment" (2007)

Alternative cover

"8th of November" is a song written and recorded by American country music duo Big & Rich. It was released in May 2006 as the third and final single from their album Comin' to Your City. The song became the duo's seventh Top 40 hit on the Billboard Hot Country Songs charts, where it peaked at No. 18, in addition to reaching No. 94 on the Billboard Hot 100.

== Content ==
The song, which begins with a spoken introduction by Kris Kristofferson, tells the tale of Niles Harris, a soldier in the 173rd Airborne Brigade of the United States Army during Operation Hump in South Vietnam on November 8, 1965. The intro mentions that Harris was "the guy that gave Big Kenny his top hat", and that he was among the wounded who were saved by Army medic Lawrence Joel, the first living African American to receive the Medal of Honor since the Spanish–American War of 1898.

The song is in a 6/8 time signature, and is in A mixolydian with a primary chord pattern of A–G–D–A.

== Critical reception ==
Kevin John Coyne, reviewing the song for Country Universe, gave it a positive rating. He said the song is the best war song since "Travelin' Soldier". Stephen Thomas Erlewine, in his review of the album for Allmusic, called it "awkwardly jingoistic".

== Music video ==
The music video was directed and produced by Deaton-Flanigen Productions, and premiered on CMT on June 15, 2006. It begins with an introduction by Kris Kristofferson, and then it cuts to the duo performing in front of a large screen, showing the visuals of Harris' life.

== Awards ==
The song was nominated for the 2006 CMA Awards song of the year category; its music video was also nominated for video of the year categories for the CMAs, ACM Awards, and the 49th Annual Grammy Awards.

== Chart performance ==
Chart (2006)	Peak position
US Billboard Hot 100	94
US Hot Country Songs (Billboard)	18
