= Adam Shoenfeld =

American guitarist, songwriter, and music producer

- Born: April 29, 1974 (age 51)
- Origin: Huntington, NY, United States
- Genres: Country
- Occupation(s): Recording and Touring Guitarist, Songwriter, Producer
- Instrument(s): Electric guitar, acoustic guitar, keyboards, bass guitar
- Years active: 2003-present
- Website: www.adamshoenfeld.com

Adam Shoenfeld (born April 29, 1974) is a professional guitarist, songwriter and producer based in Nashville, TN. Primarily focused on modern country music, his guitar playing has been featured on over 500 albums, and is closely associated with Big & Rich ("Save a Horse (Ride a Cowboy)") and Jason Aldean ("Hicktown").

== History ==
Born in Huntington, NY, and raised in Blairstown, NJ, Shoenfeld moved to Nashville after graduating high school, where he worked as a house musician at Woodland Studios. While working in the studio, Shoenfeld also performed with many different artists in Nashville, and was introduced to Hollywood Records recording artist "Big Kenny" Alphin.

After a brief period of touring in support of Big Kenny’s solo effort Live a Little, they formed the rock band luvjOi, and it was during this time that Shoenfeld met singer-songwriter John Rich.

Simultaneously, the MuzikMafia was born, a music and art collective in which Shoenfeld was a longstanding member and also included Jon Nicholson, Gretchen Wilson, Cowboy Troy and others.

Rich began using Shoenfeld as a frequent guitarist in the recording studio, playing on demos of songs like "Redneck Woman" and "Hicktown" (penned by Rich and later recorded by Wilson and Aldean, respectively).

After Luvjoi disbanded, the country duo Big & Rich was formed by Alphin and Rich and signed to Warner Bros. Records in 2004.

Shoenfeld was invited to take part in the recording of the duo’s debut album Horse of a Different Color, which reached the top of the Billboard Country Albums Chart and featured Shoenfeld’s guitar playing on the multi-platinum hit, "Save a Horse (Ride a Cowboy)," a fusion of country, rock and rap. He not only has played on every Big & Rich album to date, but is a co-author on the songs "Real World," "High Five," "When the Devil Gets the Best of Me," and "M-E-D-L-E-Y of the Hillbilly Jedi."

Shoenfeld toured with Big & Rich in 2005, 2006, 2007 and 2009, and while working with Big & Rich also accepted a spot in Jason Aldean’s band to perform at record label showcases. He continued to work with Aldean thereafter, and on Aldean’s self-titled debut album Shoenfeld performed the guitar part on "Hicktown," a Top 10 radio hit and platinum certified track noted for its heavy, hard-rock style guitars.

Since then, Shoenfeld has played lead guitar on every Aldean release to date, and is also co-author of the song "Laid Back," featured on Aldean’s Old Boots, New Dirt album.

The edgy sound made popular in part by Aldean and Big & Rich made Shoenfeld an in-demand session musician, and he has gone on to play guitar on over 200 albums for artists such as Luke Bryan, Keith Urban, Blake Shelton, Florida Georgia Line, Jake Owen, Thomas Rhett, Alabama, Tim McGraw, Lee Brice, Rascal Flatts and many more.

In 2012, Shoenfeld joined country superstar Tim McGraw’s touring band, and currently tours with McGraw while also maintaining his recording career.

== Producing ==
Shoenfeld has taken on the role of producer on the following albums: Kelsey Harmon’s One Big Favor, Sarah Darling’s Angels & Devils, John Rich’s Rich Rocks, Instant Karma: The Amnesty International Campaign to Save Darfur, and luvjOi’s Volume 2.

AWARDS

In 2005, Shoenfeld was awarded SESAC’s Song of the Year honor for "Mississippi Girl," a No. 1 hit for Faith Hill co-written with John Rich.

Shoenfeld has been nominated for ACM Guitarist of the Year Award in 2011, 2012, 2015. 2017, 2018, and 2019.
