= Wild West Show (song) =

Single by Big & Rich

from the album Horse of a Different Color
- B-side: "Saved"
- Released: December 15, 2003
- Recorded: 2003
- Genre: Country
- Length: 4:20 (album version); 3:59 (radio edit)
- Label: Warner Bros. Nashville
- Songwriters: Big Kenny; John Rich; Blair Daly
- Producers: Big Kenny; Rich; Paul Worley

Big & Rich singles chronology
"Wild West Show" (2003)	"Save a Horse (Ride a Cowboy)" (2004)

"Wild West Show" is a debut song co-written and recorded by American country music duo Big & Rich. It was released in December 2003 as the first single from their debut album Horse of a Different Color. It reached No. 21 on the U.S. Billboard Hot Country Singles & Tracks (now Hot Country Songs) charts. The song was written by Big Kenny, John Rich and Blair Daly.

== Content ==
The song uses 19th-century Western imagery to describe an argument between a man and a woman ("It was a big showdown / Oh yeah, we stood our ground / Shot out the lights, it got a little crazy"). The song also talks about forgiveness and a relationship.

== Critical reception ==
Chuck Eddy of The Village Voice wrote that the song "mixes a placid keyboard intro, spacious spaghetti-western guitars, and Andes flute solos into a tepee-and-peace-pipe lyric that repeatedly chants 'hey yaaaa!'" Deborah Evans Price of Billboard magazine also gave it a positive review, saying that it has a "very distinct vibe", also calling it "hauntingly beautiful" and saying that it had "quirky Western imagery".

== Personnel ==
From Horse of a Different Color liner notes.

- Big Kenny - vocals
- Dennis Burnside - keyboards
- Mike Johnson - steel guitar
- Wayne Killius - drums, shaker, peanut can
- Duncan Mullins - bass guitar
- John Rich - acoustic guitar, vocals
- Adam Shoenfeld - electric guitar
- Nicole Summers - flute

== Chart positions ==
Chart (2003–2004)	Peak position
US Billboard Hot 100	85
US Hot Country Songs (Billboard)	21
