= Holy Water (Big & Rich song) =

Single by Big & Rich

from the album Horse of a Different Color
- Released: September 20, 2004
- Recorded: 2003
- Genre: Country
- Length: 4:16
- Label: Warner Bros. Nashville
- Songwriters: Big Kenny; John Rich; Vicky McGehee; Jeff Cohen
- Producers: Big Kenny; John Rich; Paul Worley

Big & Rich singles chronology
"Save a Horse (Ride a Cowboy)" (2004)	"Holy Water" (2004)	"Big Time" (2005)

"Holy Water" is a song co-written and recorded by American country music duo Big & Rich. It was released in September 2004 as the third single from debut album Horse of a Different Color. It reached number 15 on the U.S. Billboard Hot Country Songs chart. The song was written by Big Kenny, John Rich, Vicky McGehee and Jeff Cohen.

== Content ==
The duo wrote the song in honor of their sisters, both of whom had been affected by domestic abuse.

== Music video ==
The music video was directed by Deaton-Flanigen Productions and Marc Oswald. It premiered in November 2004. It first shows an intro, with Rich and Big Kenny's sisters. The rest of the video is of the duo playing, interspersed with images of women who have - presumably - been victims of abuse.

== Personnel ==
From Horse of a Different Color liner notes.

- Big Kenny - vocals
- Brian Barnett - drums, tambourine
- Mike Johnson - steel guitar
- Matt Pierson - bass guitar
- John Rich - vocals, acoustic guitar
- Michael Rojas - keyboards
- Adam Shoenfeld - electric guitar
- Jonathan Yudkin - mandolin, strings

== Chart positions ==
"Holy Water" debuted at 51 on the U.S Billboard Hot Country Singles & Tracks for the week of October 2, 2004.

Chart (2004–2005)	Peak position
US Billboard Hot 100	75
US Hot Country Songs (Billboard)	15
