= Vicky McGehee =

American country music songwriter

- Born: Shawnee, Oklahoma, U.S.
- Origin: Meeker, Oklahoma, U.S.
- Genre: Country
- Occupation: Songwriter
- Years active: 1997–present

Vicky Lynn McGehee is an American country music songwriter.

Among the songs that McGehee has written are "Heart Hold On" by The Buffalo Club, "All Jacked Up" by Gretchen Wilson, "Holy Water" by Big & Rich, "Why" by Jason Aldean, "Like We Never Loved at All" by Faith Hill and Tim McGraw, "Wildflower" by The JaneDear girls, "It's Just That Way" by Alan Jackson, and "I Will Not Say Goodbye" by Danny Gokey. She also composed several tracks on Wilson's first two albums. McGehee won a Songwriter of the Year award from Broadcast Music Incorporated in 2005.

In 2011, she signed a contract with Peer Music.
