= Angie Aparo =

American musician and songwriter

- Born: James Angelo Aparo; 1960-61; Atlanta, Georgia, United States
- Genres: Rock; pop; folk music
- Occupations: Singer-songwriter, guitarist
- Instrument: Acoustic guitar
- Years active: 1996–present

James Angelo "Angie" Aparo is an American musician and songwriter from Atlanta, Georgia.

Aparo began playing in a group called Angie's Hope in the early 1990s before making the decision to go solo. After making that decision, Aparo chose to go out on the road touring with his acoustic guitar in the Southeast. In 1996, he released his first album, Out of the Everywhere, recorded at David Briggs Studio in Nashville, Tennessee with Jim Stabile as engineer.

In 1999, with Matt Serletic, Aparo released his second studio album The American. His single, "Spaceship," was released in 2000 and became one of his biggest hits. The American also includes his original version of the song "Cry", made popular by Faith Hill and featured on her album of the same name. Faith Hill's husband Tim McGraw also covered "Free Man" from The American.

Following record label issues, Aparo released the independent album Weapon of Mass Construction (2001) (Later re-released under the title One With the Sun), a CD of cover songs taken from varying artists from Beastie Boys to Neil Young and Elton John, as well as two previously unreleased originals. In his own words, "It was fun, and I got it out of my system."

In 2003, he released another album, For Stars and Moon, again independently.

Aparo put together backing band The Infidels and toured the Southeast while recording a 2006's EP "El Primero Del Tres" with producer Dann Huff. The Infidels consists of Derek Murphy (The American, 9Live, One With the Sun, For Stars and Moon, Praise Be), Mark Dannells, Martin Lesch (For Stars and Moon), and Shannon Woods. Aparo also released the album Praise Be that year.

In 2009, Aparo contributed the song "Junkyard" with the Zac Brown Band on their album Pass The Jar – Zac Brown Band And Friends From The Fabulous Fox Theatre in Atlanta (Live).

In April 2016, Aparo suffered torn carotid artery, which caused a stroke that initially immobilized him and rendered him unable to speak or remember his songs.

In February 2018 he released the album "Life Is a Flower, Life Is a Gun."

== Discography ==
- Out of the Everywhere (1996)
- The American (1999)
- Weapon of Mass Construction (also released under the title "One With the Sun") (2001)
- For Stars and Moon (2003)
- 9Live (2004)
- El Primero Del Tres (2006)
- Praise Be (2006)
- Life Is a Flower, Life Is a Gun (2018)

== Band members ==
- Angie Aparo: Vocals
- Derek Murphy: Drums
