= Big & Rich =

American country music duo

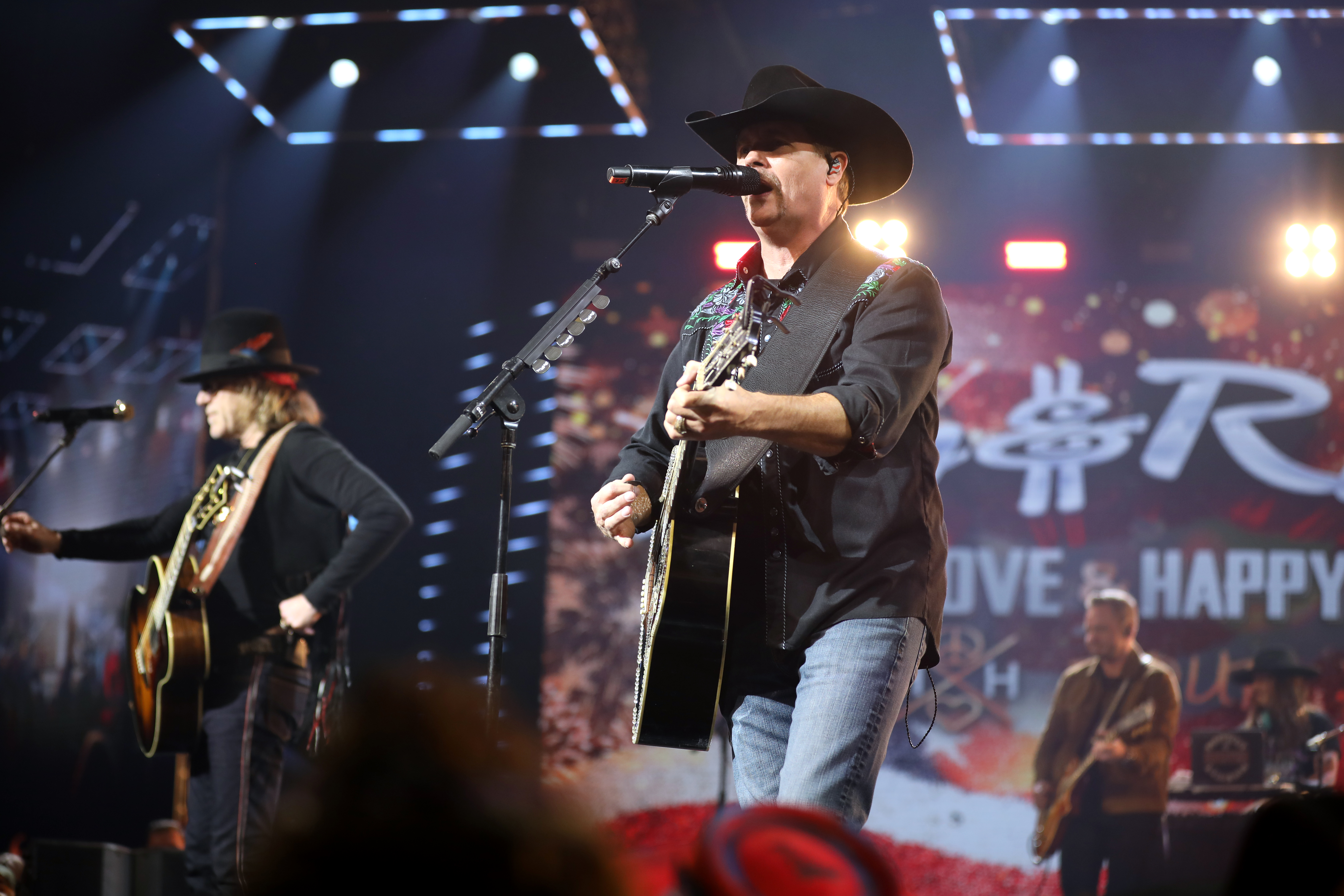
- Big Kenny (left) and John Rich (right) in Phoenix, Arizona, 2023.

Background information
- Origin: Nashville, Tennessee, United States
- Genre: Country
- Years active: 1998–2008, 2011–present
- Labels: Warner Bros. Nashville, Big & Rich Records
- Formerly of: MuzikMafia
- Spinoff of: Lonestar; luvj0i
- Members: Big Kenny; John Rich
- Website: www.bigandrich.com

Big & Rich is an American country music duo from Nashville, Tennessee. The duo consists of Big Kenny and John Rich, both of whom are songwriters, vocalists, and guitarists. Before the duo's foundation, Rich was bass guitarist in the country band Lonestar, while Kenny was a solo artist for Hollywood Records.

Their first studio album, Horse of a Different Color, was released in 2004. This album produced four straight Top 40 country hits, including the number 11 "Save a Horse (Ride a Cowboy)", plus collaborations with Cowboy Troy, Gretchen Wilson, and Martina McBride. Comin' to Your City was released in November 2005, followed by another Top 20 single the Vietnam War-inspired "8th of November" and two more Top 40 hits. Joining the duo on this album were Cowboy Troy, Wilson, and Kris Kristofferson. Between Raising Hell and Amazing Grace, released in 2007, produced their only No. 1 single, "Lost in This Moment". Both before and during the duo's hiatus, Rich has worked as a producer and songwriter for several other artists.

After this album, both members went on hiatus and released solo albums in 2009—Big Kenny's The Quiet Times of a Rock and Roll Farm Boy and Rich's Son of a Preacher Man. These also produced the duo's first Top 40 solo entries—Big Kenny with "Long After I'm Gone" and Rich with "Shuttin' Detroit Down". In 2010, Big Kenny released his second solo country album, Big Kenny's Love Everybody Traveling Musical Medicine Show Mix Tape, Vol. 1 and in 2011, Rich released the extended plays For the Kids and Rich Rocks, the latter of which included the Top 40 country single "Country Done Come to Town". Big & Rich reunited on May 13, 2011 to release "Fake ID", a cut from the soundtrack to the 2011 film Footloose. A year later, the duo released their fourth album, Hillbilly Jedi, which produced the Top 20 hit "That's Why I Pray". In July 2013, Rich announced that the duo had begun work on their fifth studio album, Gravity, which was released independently. Another independent album, Did it For the Party, was announced in 2017 for release in September, led by the single "California".

== History ==
Prior to Big & Rich's foundation, John Rich was a founding member of the band Texassee, which later became Lonestar. Rich played bass guitar in the band and alternated with Richie McDonald on lead vocals; he also co-wrote their singles "Come Cryin' to Me" and "Say When". After Lonestar released their second studio album, Rich departed from the band in 1998, leaving McDonald as the band's sole lead singer. Kenny Alphin (aka Big Kenny) was signed to Hollywood Records in 1998, where he recorded a rock album called Live a Little a year later. Although one of its songs was featured in the soundtrack to the film Gun Shy, Live a Little was not released, and Hollywood Records held the rights to the songs for five years. In the meantime, The Mavericks recorded one of Alphin's songs ("I Hope You Want Me Too") on their 1998 album Trampoline, and Danni Leigh recorded his "Beatin' My Head Against the Wall" on her album 29 Nights. Big Kenny then befriended Rich after meeting him at a club, and the two began writing songs together. Their first songwriting collaboration was "I Pray for You," which they wrote in October 1998.

Following his departure from Hollywood Records, Big Kenny recorded in a short-lived band called luvjOi, whose lead guitarist Adam Shoenfeld and drummer Larry Babb would later become part of Big & Rich's road band. In 2000, Rich began recording as a solo artist as well. He charted two singles of his own — "I Pray for You" and "Forever Loving You," which respectively reached numbers 53 and number 46 on the U.S. Hot Country Songs charts — but his debut album, Underneath the Same Moon, was not released at the time. The two then founded the MuzikMafia (an abbreviation for Musically Artistic Friends in Alliance), a roundtable aggregation of singer-songwriters including Cowboy Troy, James Otto, Gretchen Wilson and Shannon Lawson. This group held its first official show at a Nashville, Tennessee, nightclub in 2001. Big & Rich performed at The Bluebird Cafe on January 1, 2002.

Among Big Kenny and John Rich's first outside cuts as songwriters was "Amarillo Sky", which was the title track to McBride & the Ride's 2002 album Amarillo Sky and later a top 5 hit for Jason Aldean in 2007. The two also wrote and sang backing vocals on "She's a Butterfly", which was recorded by Martina McBride on her album Martina. After McBride cut this song, manager Marc Oswald suggested that Rich and Big Kenny begin recording as a duo. Rich was apprehensive at first, as he had been told by BNA staff that he was "too rock for country" and was unsure of what major labels would think of Big Kenny's rock influences. The two began recording songs together at a songwriting seminar. After they recorded a demo of "Holy Water", Rich was convinced that the duo would be successful. They then met with Paul Worley, a record producer who was then the head of creative affairs at Warner Bros. Records Nashville, and Worley helped sign Big & Rich to a recording contract in late 2003.

In 2007, Reservoir Media Management acquired the publishing rights to Rich's and Kenny's song catalogs.

== Major-label career ==
=== 2004–2005: Horse of a Different Color ===
The two then began writing songs for their debut album. Among these was "Wild West Show," which they wrote before a trip to Deadwood, South Dakota. The duo decided to use wild West imagery to convey "an argument between a man and a woman". In February 2004, it was released as their debut single, going on to peak at number 21 on the Billboard country singles charts. It was the first release from their debut album Horse of a Different Color. Following the album's release, Big & Rich began touring with Tim McGraw.

Big & Rich debuted their second single, "Save a Horse (Ride a Cowboy)", at that year's Academy of Country Music awards. For this song, Big & Rich employed Deaton-Flanigen Productions, a music video directing duo composed of Robert Deaton and George Flanigen IV. Deaton-Flanigen and Oswald, along with the duo, decided to make "a big, big show of a video", featuring cameo appearances from Gretchen Wilson and Cowboy Troy, as well as a marching band and a dancing troupe. The song peaked at number 11 on the country singles charts, and the video was the most-requested on the television networks Country Music Television (CMT) and Great American Country (GAC) for four weeks. "Save a Horse" was also a minor hit in Germany, reaching number 87 on the Media Control Charts. ESPN also used the song as the theme music for its World Series of Poker. They and Cowboy Troy performed "Rollin' (The Ballad of Big & Rich)" at the Country Music Association awards telecast, where they were also nominated for the Horizon Award. (Now known as the New Artist award, this is awarded to new artists who make significant commercial success from a first or second album.)

"Holy Water" was the third single release, reaching number 15 on the country singles charts. The duo wrote this song about Big Kenny's sister Charlene, a domestic abuse victim. Finishing off the album's single releases was "Big Time", which peaked at number 20 in early 2005. Big & Rich also released a special Independence Day single titled "Our America", with guest vocals from Wilson and Cowboy Troy, which charted for two weeks and peaked at number 44.

Horse of a Different Color was met with generally positive reviews. Stephen Thomas Erlewine of Allmusic called it "wilder and stranger than most contemporary country albums of 2004", and Chris Willman of Entertainment Weekly said that "the disc really flies when Big & Rich just honor the straight-up rowdiness of Bocephus". Country Weekly also gave a positive review, praising the variety of musical influences and saying that all of the songs worked "ridiculously well".

=== 2005–2006: Comin' to Your City ===
The duo's second album, Comin' to Your City, was released on November 15, 2005. The first single, "Comin' to Your City" received a similar reaction as "Save a Horse (Ride a Cowboy)" had a year earlier, although rather than poker, ESPN utilized an altered version of the song as the opening theme for its Saturday program College GameDay. The song peaked at number 21. In its music video, the duo appeared in a guitar-shaped spaceship.

Their next single, "Never Mind Me", reached a peak at number 34. Next came "8th of November", while only peaking at number 18, garnered the duo nominations for the CMA Awards, Grammy Awards, and the ACM Awards. The song was inspired by the story of Niles Harris. A subsequent documentary titled "November 8: a true American story of honor" was released also, debuting on Great American Country television network over the July 4 weekend. The documentary tells the story of Niles Harris and shows the making of the music video for the single.

An extended play of live studio performances, Rolling Stone Original, was also released in November 2005. During a benefit concert held on October 9, 2006, in Atlanta, Georgia to raise money for the construction of the 173d Airborne Memorial, Big & Rich were awarded the status of Honorary Members of the 503d Regiment of the 173d Airborne Brigade. The concert was the subject of a documentary on Great American Country in November 2006.

Also in 2005, Hollywood Records released Big Kenny's debut album and in 2006 BNA Records released Rich's.

=== 2007–2008: Between Raising Hell and Amazing Grace ===
In early 2007, the duo released "Lost in This Moment", which was the lead-off single to their third album, Between Raising Hell and Amazing Grace. "Lost in This Moment" became Big & Rich's only Number One single, spending two weeks at the top of the country music charts. The song also began receiving airplay on adult contemporary radio and became their first chart entry for that format, reaching number 12.

They released their second single, "Between Raising Hell and Amazing Grace" to country radio in August 2007, although it failed to make an impact on the charts, peaking at number 37; follow-up "Loud" became the duo's first single to miss the Top 40. Another cut from this album, a cover of AC/DC's "You Shook Me All Night Long", also charted at number 59 as a non-single two months before the release of the title track.

The duo also released three live in the studio extended plays during 2007: Walmart Soundcheck, Rhapsody Originals and Unplugged at Studio 330.

=== 2008–2011: Hiatus, solo projects, and reunion ===
In 2008, Rich announced that Big & Rich would go on hiatus while Big Kenny recovered from an existing neck injury. In the meantime, Rich said that he would release a solo album, "with Kenny's blessing". Warner Bros. released Rich's second solo album, Son of a Preacher Man, in early 2009. The album produced three singles, including the number 12 country hit "Shuttin' Detroit Down". Later in the same year, Big Kenny released The Quiet Times of a Rock and Roll Farm Boy via his own Glotown label, and charted at number 34 with the single "Long After I'm Gone".

In 2010, Big Kenny released his second solo album, Big Kenny's Love Everybody Traveling Musical Medicine Show Mix Tape, Vol. 1 exclusively through BigKenny.TV and BigSouthMusic.com. Rich released two extended plays in early 2011: Rich Rocks and For the Kids, both on Reprise Records. The former produced his second solo top 40 hit in 2010, "Country Done Come to Town", also peaking at number 34. Big & Rich reunited later in 2011 to record the song "Fake I.D." for the soundtrack to the 2011 film Footloose. It includes a guest vocal from Gretchen Wilson, with whom the duo toured that same year.

=== 2012–2013: Hillbilly Jedi ===
In 2012, Big & Rich announced that they would release their fourth studio album, Hillbilly Jedi, led by the single "That's Why I Pray". Danelle Leverett, formerly one-half of The JaneDear Girls, wrote the song with Blair Daly and Sarah Buxton. Rich said that he felt that the song could be the biggest of the duo's career. The single debuted at number 24 on the country charts, the highest debut achieved by a duo since the charts were first tabulated by Nielsen BDS in 1990.

Preceding the album's release was an extended play by the name of That's Why I Pray, which featured the single as well as three previously released songs. The EP was only issued on CD and available exclusively at Walmart.

Released on September 18, 2012, the album produced two more singles, "Party Like Cowboyz" and "Cheat on You", both of which failed to make Top 40. In 2012, Big & Rich were nominated for Vocal Duo of the Year at the CMA Awards and in 2013 at the ACM Awards.

=== 2013–present: Big & Rich Records, Gravity and "Did It for the Party" ===
In July 2013, Rich announced that the duo was already working on their fifth studio album. Kenny revealed that their new material would be more along the lines of the music on their debut album, and that the executives at Warner Bros. Nashville told them that it was their "best material in years". Early in 2014, the duo announced that a new single, titled "Look at You", would be sent to radio soon and that the new album would be released later in 2014. Kenny and Rich also formed their own record label, Big & Rich Records, to handle their future musical endeavors.

On January 28, 2014, the lead off single to the album was released and the album title was revealed as Gravity. On July 28, the album's release date was confirmed to be September 23, 2014. In addition, the track listing and cover art were also revealed the next day. The duo said that their decision to start their own label was the result of Warner Bros. Nashville's schedule not allowing for Gravity to be released until 2015 at the earliest. Rather than have the project shelved, Big & Rich opted to strike out on their own and release the album sooner. Of the decision to form their own label, Kenny said that "it’s the kind of thing we believed in ten years ago as the Musik Mafia. Just anyway to get the music out there." The second single from Gravity, "Run Away with You", charted at number 11 on Country Airplay. "Lovin' Lately", a duet with Tim McGraw, is the third single.

The duo released a new single, "California", in April 2017. The song was previously recorded by McGraw on his album Damn Country Music, and his version featured them on backing vocals. Their sixth studio album, Did It for the Party, followed in September 2017 to largely rave reviews.

== Collaboration and special appearances ==
Since their first collaboration with Martina McBride in 2003, the duo has appeared on several other albums. Wilson and Cowboy Troy then appeared on Comin' to Your City on the track "Our America". Their third album featured John Legend on "Eternity" and Wyclef Jean on "Please Man", as well as Lil Jon on a remix of "Loud" featured on the album's iTunes release. Legend played the piano and sang a verse during the duo's performance of "Lost in This Moment" at the 2007 ACM Awards.

In 2005, the duo contributed vocals to a rerecording of Billy Joe Shaver's 1993 song, "Live Forever." Big & Rich also co-wrote several songs and provided background vocals on several cuts from Cowboy Troy's two Warner Bros. releases: 2005's Loco Motive and 2007's Black in the Saddle. In 2006, the Hank Williams, Jr. song "That's How They Do It in Dixie" was released, a single to which Big & Rich, Gretchen Wilson and Van Zant contributed guest vocals. It debuted one month after the duo's own single "Never Mind Me."

Rich co-wrote several of Gretchen Wilson's singles, including her debut release "Redneck Woman". He also co-wrote singles for Jason Aldean ("Hicktown", "Amarillo Sky", "Johnny Cash"), Wynonna Judd ("Attitude"), Faith Hill ("Mississippi Girl", "Like We Never Loved at All", "Sunshine and Summertime") and Keith Anderson ("Pickin' Wildflowers"). Big Kenny wrote Tim McGraw's "Last Dollar (Fly Away)", which went to number one in 2007, and co-wrote Wilson's "Here for the Party" with Rich. Rich has also produced for Wilson, Cowboy Troy, James Otto, Shannon Brown, Jewel, and The JaneDear girls.

Since 2005, the duo's song "Comin' to Your City" has been used as the opening theme to ESPN's College GameDay. In 2011, the song was reworked and re-recorded by the duo specifically for the event. The duo also contributed to Instant Karma: The Amnesty International Campaign to Save Darfur with a cover of John Lennon's "Nobody Told Me" in 2007. That same year, the duo was also featured in a duet with rock band Bon Jovi on their Lost Highway album. The song, titled "We Got It Going On", was selected as a promotional song for the Arena Football League's 2007 season. In 2008, Big & Rich recorded a cover of the Beastie Boys' "(You Gotta) Fight for Your Right (To Party!)" for the compilation album The Imus Ranch Record. In 2014, the duo performed a cover of "Same Old Situation" on a Mötley Crüe tribute album. 2015 saw Big & Rich provide background vocals on albums by Tim McGraw and Clint Black. For the McGraw album, the song "California" was written by John Rich.

== Discography ==
=== Studio albums ===
- Horse of a Different Color (2004)
- Comin' to Your City (2005)
- Between Raising Hell and Amazing Grace (2007)
- Hillbilly Jedi (2012)
- Gravity (2014)
- Did It for the Party (2017)

== Awards and nominations ==
Year	Association	Category	Result	Ref
2004	Billboard Music Awards	New Country Duo/Group of the Year	Won	
2004	CMA Awards	Vocal Duo of the Year	Nominated	
2004	CMA Awards	Horizon Award	Nominated	
2005	Grammy Awards	Best Country Vocal Performance by a Duo or Group - "Save a Horse (Ride a Cowboy)"	Nominated	
2005	ACM Awards	Top New Artist	Nominated	
2005	ACM Awards	Top Vocal Duo	Nominated	
2005	ACM Awards	Video of The Year - "Save a Horse (Ride a Cowboy)"	Nominated	
2005	CMA Awards	Vocal Duo of the Year	Nominated	
2005	CMA Awards	Horizon Award	Nominated	
2005	CMT Music Awards	Video of the Year - "Save a Horse (Ride a Cowboy)"	Nominated	
2005	CMT Music Awards	Breakthrough Video of the Year - "Save a Horse (Ride a Cowboy)"	Nominated	
2005	CMT Music Awards	Group/Duo Video of the Year - "Holy Water"	Nominated	
2005	CMT Music Awards	Most Inspiring Video of the Year - "Holy Water"	Nominated	
2006	Grammy Awards	Best Country Vocal Performance by a Duo or Group - "Comin' To Your City"	Nominated	
2006	ACM Awards	Top Vocal Duo	Nominated	
2006	ACM Awards	Top New Duo or Vocal Group	Nominated	
2006	ACM Awards	Vocal Event of the Year - "I Play Chicken With the Train" (with Cowboy Troy)	Nominated	
2006	CMA Awards	Vocal Duo of the Year	Nominated	
2006	CMA Awards	Music Video of the Year - "8th of November"	Nominated	
2007	Grammy Awards	Best Music Video, Short Form - "8th of November"	Nominated	
2007	ACM Awards	Top Vocal Duo	Nominated	
2007	ACM Awards	Video of the Year - "8th of November"	Nominated	
2007	ACM Awards	Vocal Event of the Year - "That's How They Do It In Dixie" (with Hank Williams Jr.)	Nominated	
2007	CMA Awards	Vocal Duo of the Year	Nominated	
2007	CMA Awards	Single of the Year - "Lost In This Moment"	Nominated	
2007	CMT Music Awards	Duo video of the year - "8th Of November"	Nominated	
2008	ACM Awards	Top Vocal Duo	Nominated	
2008	ACM Awards	Single Record of the Year - "Lost In This Moment"	Nominated	
2008	ACM Awards	Song of the Year - "Lost In This Moment"	Nominated	
2008	ACM Awards	Video of the Year- "Lost In This Moment"	Nominated	
2008	CMA Awards	Vocal Duo of the Year	Nominated	
2008	CMT Music Awards	Duo video of the year - "Between Raising Hell and Amazing Grace"	Nominated	
2008	CMT Music Awards	Duo video of the year - "Lost in This Moment"	Nominated	
2008	CMT Music Awards	Performance of the year - "Lost in This Moment" (with John Legend)	Nominated	
2008	CMT Music Awards	Tearjerker Video of the Year - "Lost in This Moment"	Nominated	
2009	ACM Awards	Top Vocal Duo	Nominated	
2009	CMA Awards	Vocal Duo of the Year	Nominated	
2012	CMA Awards	Vocal Duo of the Year	Nominated	
2013	ACM Awards	Top Vocal Duo	Nominated	
2013	CMT Music Awards	Duo Video of the Year - "That's Why I Pray"	Nominated	
2013	CMA Awards	Vocal Duo of the Year	Nominated	
2014	Ride of Fame	Immortal	Won	
2014	ACM Awards	Vocal Duo of the Year	Nominated	
2015	CMT Music Awards	Duo Video of the Year - "Look At You"	Nominated	
2017	ACM Awards	Vocal Duo of the Year	Nominated	
2017	CMT Music Awards	Duo Video of the Year - "Lovin' Lately" (feat. Tim McGraw)	Nominated	

== Filmography ==
- Blue Collar TV - Season 1, Episodes 10: "Music" and 11: "Partying"
- Las Vegas – Season 2, Episode 24: "Centennial" (2005)
- November 8: A True American Story of Honor (2006) (documentary)
- NASCAR 08 – Soundtrack (2007) (video game)
- The Bachelor - Season 19, Episode 6: "Deadwood, South Dakota" (2015)
- Footloose (2011) (film)
