= Cowboy Troy =

American rapper (born 1970)

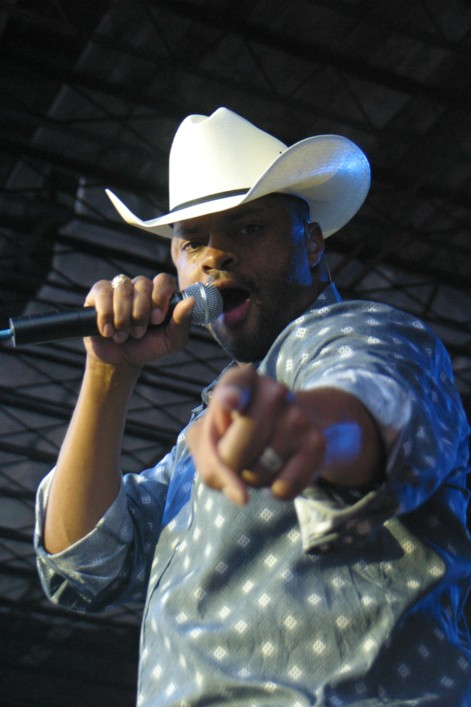
- Cowboy Troy performing in 2005

Background information
- Born: Troy Lee Coleman III; December 18, 1970 (age 55)
- Origin: Victoria, Texas, U.S.
- Genre: Country rap
- Occupation: Rapper
- Years active: 1999–present
- Labels: Warner Bros.; CTMC/Winding Road; Heart Songs Corporation
- Formerly of: MuzikMafia
- Website: CowboyTroy.com

Troy Lee Coleman III (born December 18, 1970), better known by his stage name Cowboy Troy, is an American rapper known for his country rap style. He has released seven studio albums and one EP, including three releases on Warner Bros. Records, and has charted twice on the Billboard country singles charts. He is a former member of the MuzikMafia, an aggregation of singers and songwriters formed by John Rich of Big & Rich. His major-label debut album Loco Motive included the charted single "I Play Chicken with the Train".

== Early life ==
Coleman was born in Victoria, Texas, on December 18, 1970. He graduated from Skyline High School in the Dallas Independent School District. Coleman then attended the University of Texas at Austin where he earned a bachelor's degree in psychology. Prior to beginning his career as a singer, he worked as the assistant manager of a Dallas area Foot Locker.

He got the name Cowboy Troy in college, after a friend used the name to distinguish the cowboy-hat-wearing Coleman from his other friends named Troy.

== Career ==
On May 17, 2005, Troy released his first major-label solo album, Loco Motive, through the RAYBAW records production label and the Warner Music Group distribution label. The album debuted at No. 2 on Billboard's Top Country Albums chart. The first single, "I Play Chicken with the Train," peaked at No. 48 on Billboard's Hot Country Songs chart on April 9, 2005 and was the No. 1 country download at the iTunes Music Store on April 15, 2005.

As a Chevrolet promotion, Troy, Gretchen Wilson, and Big & Rich released "Our America" as a free, time-limited download on July 1, 2005. They also performed the song live at the Boston Pops concert on July 4, 2005. "Our America" combines "The Star-Spangled Banner" with spoken word of parts of the U.S. Constitution, Declaration of independence, Pledge of Allegiance and Martin Luther King Jr.'s 1963 "I Have a Dream" speech. The song peaked at No. 44 on Billboard's Hot Country Songs chart, and appears as a bonus track on both Big & Rich's Comin' to Your City and Wilson's All Jacked Up albums.

Cowboy Troy released the single "If You Don't Wanna Love Me", a duet with Sarah Buxton. The single failed to chart, as did the follow-up, "My Last Yee Haw." A promotional single, titled "Hook 'Em Horns", was released on February 14, 2006 after his alma mater (the Texas Longhorns) won the national championship in football.

=== 2006-present ===
Cowboy Troy co-hosted, with Jewel, the fifth season of Nashville Star on the USA Network and CMT Canada.

Troy made a special appearance at the March 13, 2006 episode of WWE's RAW in Beaumont, Texas. He came to the announcer's table and helped announce for the match between superstars Edge and Goldust. His entrance music was "My Last Yee Haw." The April 30 episode of WWE's Raw, broadcast from Nashville, showed Troy in the crowd. The announcers mentioned him, and his duties hosting Nashville Star. In 2007, he released Black in the Saddle.

Troy parted ways with Warner Bros. Nashville in 2008. He released Demolition Mission: Studio Blue Sessions in 2009. Troy returned to Warner Music Nashville to release "King of Clubs" in March 2014.

Cowboy Troy was cited as a featured guest artist on two tracks from the 2011 Vanilla Ice release titled WTF, which is available on iTunes.

In 2012, Troy appeared on the May 21 and 22 finale of Season 14 of the television show Dancing with the Stars, performing "I Play Chicken With the Train."

His 2017 single "Pork Chop" was used as the theme for "Porktober", the National Pork Board's October 2017 promotion.

Troy starred in the 2022 Western film Desperate Riders.

== Personal life ==
Cowboy Troy performed at the 2008 Republican National Convention in St. Paul, Minnesota. He is a self-described black conservative and a member of the Republican Party who supported Senator John McCain in the 2008 U.S. presidential election.

== Discography ==
=== Studio albums ===
Title	Album details	Peak chart positions		
Title	Album details	US Country	US	US Rap
Beginner's Luck	Release date: September 2, 2002; Label: Self-released	—	—	—
Loco Motive	Release date: May 17, 2005; Label: Raybaw/Warner Bros. Nashville	2	15	13
Black in the Saddle	Release date: June 5, 2007; Label: Raybaw/Warner Bros. Nashville	28	153	—
Demolition Mission: Studio Blue Sessions	Release date: September 15, 2009; Label: CTMC/Winding Road	—	—	—
King of Clubs	Release date: March 11, 2014; Label: Warner Music Nashville	—	—	25
Saloons on Neptune	Release date: December 18, 2015; Label: Hick Hop Federation	—	—	—
Laugh With Me	Release date: May 18, 2018; Label: Shakin' Bacon Productions/SRG-ILS/Universal	—	—	—
"—" denotes releases that did not chart

=== Extended plays ===
Title	Album details
Hick-Hop Hysteria	Release date: 2001; Label: Self-released
Before You Knew My Name	Release date: June 2010; Label: CTMC

=== Singles ===
Year	Single	Peak chart positions			Album
Year	Single	US Country	US Bubbling	US Pop	Album
2005	"I Play Chicken with the Train" (with Big & Rich)	48	18	81	Loco Motive
2005	"If You Don't Wanna Love Me" (with Sarah Buxton)	—	—	—	Loco Motive
2006	"Hook 'Em Horns"	—	—	—	—N/a
2007	"Hick Chick" (with Angela Hacker)	—	—	—	Black in the Saddle
2009	"Cash in the Cookie Jar"	—	—	—	Demolition Mission
2010	"New Sheriff"	—	—	—	—N/a
2010	"Ballad of Cherokee Bill"	—	—	—	—N/a
2016	"Countdown to Vacation"	—	—	—	Saloons on Neptune
"—" denotes releases that did not chart

=== Other charted songs ===
Year	Single	Artist	Peak positions	Album
Year	Single	Artist	US Country	Album
2005	"Our America"	Big & Rich (with Gretchen Wilson)	44	Comin' to Your City

=== Music videos ===
Year	Video	Director
2005	"I Play Chicken with the Train"	Deaton-Flanigen
2005	"If You Don't Wanna Love Me"	Shaun Silva
2005	"My Last Yee Haw"	Kristin Barlowe
2007	"Hick Chick"	Shaun Silva

== See also ==
- Black conservatism in the United States
