= Big Kenny =

American country music singer

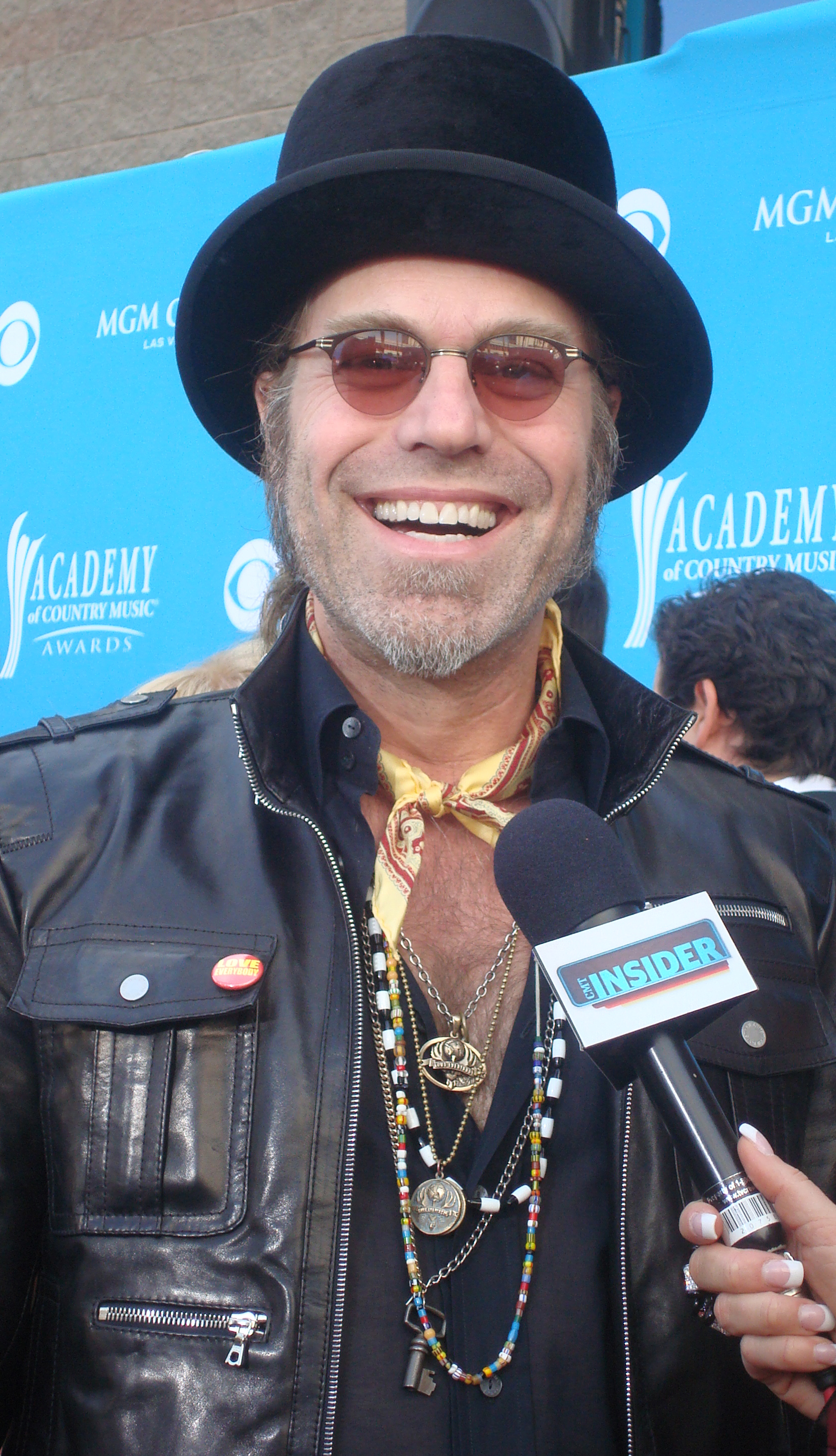
- Big Kenny in April 2010

Background information
- Also known as: Kenny Alphin
- Born: William Kenneth Alphin; November 1, 1963 (age 62)
- Origin: Culpeper, Virginia, U.S.
- Genres: Country
- Occupation: Singer-songwriter
- Instruments: Vocals, guitar
- Years active: 1999–present
- Labels: Hollywood, Warner Bros. Nashville, Glotown/Love Everybody/Bigger Picture
- Member of: Big & Rich
- Formerly of: luvjOi
- Website: bigkenny.tv

William Kenneth Alphin (born November 1, 1963), best known by his stage name Big Kenny, is an American country music singer. He and John Rich comprise the duo Big & Rich, who recorded six studio albums and charted three singles on the Billboard Hot Country Songs chart.

Before Big & Rich, Big Kenny recorded a solo album Live a Little for Hollywood Records in 1999 (although it was not released until 2005) and fronted a band called luvjOi. He has also written or co-written several of Big & Rich's songs with Rich, as well as singles for Gretchen Wilson, Jason Aldean, McBride & the Ride, and Tim McGraw. His first solo single, "Long After I'm Gone," was released to country radio on August 3, 2009, from the album The Quiet Times of a Rock and Roll Farm Boy. In 2010, his third solo album, Big Kenny's Love Everybody Traveling Musical Medicine Show Mix Tape, Vol. 1, was released but did not produce any singles.

== Biography ==
Alphin was raised on a farm in Culpeper, VA. In Nashville, he found work at Famous Music.

== Before Big & Rich ==
Before Big & Rich, Big Kenny was signed to Hollywood Records in 1999 and recorded the album Live a Little for the label. The album's release was delayed repeatedly, and was ultimately canceled, with Hollywood Records retaining control of the songs for five years and ultimately releasing it in 2005. One of its songs, "Under the Sun", was featured in the soundtrack to the 2000 film Gun Shy.

After departing the label, he founded the band luvjOi, which included Adam Shoenfeld (guitar), Larry Babb (drums) and Justin Tocket (bass guitar). Although luvjOi had a degree of local success, including the single "Discoball" and two albums, the band eventually broke up.

== Big & Rich ==
By this point in his career, Big Kenny had befriended John Rich, formerly the bass guitarist and co-lead vocalist of Lonestar. The two founded Big & Rich in the early 2000s after years of collaboration, including co-writing McBride & the Ride's 2002 single "Amarillo Sky" as well as "She's a Butterfly", an album cut for Martina McBride.

Big & Rich signed to Warner Bros. Records in 2004. The duo recorded three studio albums for the label: Horse of a Different Color (2004), Comin' to Your City (2005) and Between Raising Hell and Amazing Grace (2007), as well as two EPs and ten singles, including the Number One hit "Lost in This Moment". In 2011, Kenny rejoined John Rich to release the single Fake I.D..

== Muzik Mafia ==
Big & Rich also founded the MuzikMafia, an association of singer-songwriters which also included Shannon Lawson, Gretchen Wilson and Cowboy Troy.

== Solo career ==
Big Kenny went on hiatus in 2008 to rehabilitate a neck injury that occurred when he was hit by a drunk driver in 2001. He launched his official online community at www.bigkenny.tv in mid-2009. There, he made his first solo single, "Long After I'm Gone", available as a free download. It was released to radio in August 2009 as the first single from his second solo album, The Quiet Times of a Rock and Roll Farm Boy, which was rated number 13 on the 30 Best Country Albums of 2009 by Roughstock. Kenny also became a judge on the television talent show Can You Duet. Kenny released several non-album singles during this period.

=== Glotown ===
In 2009 Big Kenny started his own record label: Glotown Records. Big Kenny's role within the label is to serve as Chief Imagination Officer while the rest of the label is composed of Bigger Pictures Entertainment, RMP Management, and CAA Booking Agency. The label was launched in an effort to make music that changes lives. Glotown's first non-album online release, "Cry With You," was released on February 15, 2009.

=== Love Everybody Traveling Musical Medicine Show ===
On April 16, 2010, Big Kenny launched his first solo nationwide tour, the Love Everybody Traveling Musical Medicine Show. The tour launched in Agoura Hills, CA at the Canyon Club and introduced the world to Big Kenny's new band: ex-Counting Crows and Third Eye Blind drummer Steve Bowman, guitar virtuoso Jesse Howard, former Will Hogue multi-instrumentalist Devin Malone and Nashville veteran Jerry Navarro. That same year, Big Kenny released his third solo album, Big Kenny's Love Everybody Traveling Musical Medicine Show Mix Tape, Vol. 1 as a tie-in to his tour. It was sold exclusively through BigKenny.TV and BigSouthMusic.com.

== Songwriter ==
Kenny has also written or co-written several of Big & Rich's songs with Rich, as well as singles for Gretchen Wilson, Jason Aldean, McBride & the Ride, Martina McBride and Tim McGraw.

Big Kenny's co-writing credits also include "Here for the Party" for Gretchen Wilson and "Hicktown" for Jason Aldean (who also released a cover of "Amarillo Sky"). He is also the writer of Tim McGraw's Number One hit "Last Dollar (Fly Away)".

== Personal life ==
On January 23, 2005, Big Kenny married Christiev Carothers. She has two sons from a previous marriage, Christopher Carothers and Cameron Carothers, and together they have one son, Lincoln William Holiday Alphin, born on November 2, 2005. On September 17, 2010, Big Kenny and Christiev announced they had adopted a second son, Dakota Jefferson Holiday Alphin, in July 2010.

In October 2007, Big Kenny traveled to Darfur, Sudan, to deliver medical and educational supplies. He also traveled back to Akon, a remote village in Northern Bahl Ghazel in Sudan for a similar mission with My Sisters Keeper Group.

In January 2010, Big Kenny traveled to Haiti to assist in the rescue efforts in the aftermath of the 2010 Haiti earthquake.

== Discography ==
=== Studio albums ===
==== Solo ====
| Title | Details | Peak chart positions | |
| Title | Details | US Country | US |
|---|---|---|---|
| Live a Little | Release date: March 1, 2005; Label: Hollywood Records; Formats: CD, music download | — | — |
| The Quiet Times of a Rock and Roll Farm Boy | Release date: November 10, 2009; Label: Glotown Records/Love Everybody/Bigger Picture; Formats: CD, music download | 37 | 197 |
| Big Kenny's Love Everybody Traveling Musical Medicine Show Mix Tape, Vol. 1 | Release date: 2010; Label: Glotown Records/Love Everybody/Bigger Picture; Formats: CD | — | — |
| Electro Shine | Release date: January 20, 2017; Label: Glotown Records; Formats: music download | — | — |
"—" denotes releases that did not chart

==== With luvjOi ====
| Title | Details | Peak chart positions | |
| Title | Details | US Rock | US |
|---|---|---|---|
| luvjOi | Release date: 2000; Label: luvjOi Records; Formats: CD | — | — |
| Volume 2 | Release date: 2001; Label: luvjOi Records; Formats: CD | — | — |
"—" denotes releases that did not chart

==== With Electro Shine ====
| Title | Details | Peak chart positions | |
| Title | Details | US Country | US |
|---|---|---|---|
| The Hits, Vol. 1 (EP) | Release date: May 28, 2013; Label: Glotown Records/Love Everybody; Formats: Music Download | — | — |
"—" denotes releases that did not chart

=== Singles ===
| Year | Single | Peak positions | Album |
| Year | Single | US Country | Album |
|---|---|---|---|
| 2000 | "Under the Sun" | — | Gun Shy (soundtrack) |
| 2009 | "Long After I'm Gone" | 34 | The Quiet Times of a Rock and Roll Farm Boy |
| 2010 | "To Find a Heart" | — | The Quiet Times of a Rock and Roll Farm Boy |
"—" denotes releases that did not chart

=== Guest singles ===
| Year | Single | Artist |
|---|---|---|
| 2011 | "Beautiful Lies" | Jaron and the Long Road to Love |

=== Music videos ===
| Year | Video | Director |
|---|---|---|
| 2000 | "Under The Sun" | |
| 2009 | "Long After I'm Gone" | Christian Holiday/Big Kenny |
| 2009 | "Wake Up" | Christian Holiday/Big Kenny |
| 2010 | "Cry With You" | Christian Holiday/Big Kenny |
| 2011 | "Beautiful Lies" (with Jaron and the Long Road to Love) | Jaron Lowenstein |
