= 2015 in country music =

This is a list of notable events in country music that took place in 2015.

== Events ==
- January 15 – Parodist Cledus T. Judd announces his retirement from the performing aspect of the music business.
- February 27 – Carrie Underwood and Mike Fisher give birth to their son, Isaiah Michael Fisher.
- March 4 – Shania Twain announces that her Rock This Country tour will be her last but that she intends to continue releasing albums
- April – A new syndicated radio program, American Country Countdown Rewind with Bob Kingsley, consisting of Kingsley-hosted ACC programs from 1990–2005, is announced by Nash FM (the media brand and network of country music stations owned by Cumulus Media). The first programs aired the weekend of May 2.
- May 26 – Radio consultant Keith Hill is criticized when stating in an interview that music stations should limit the airplay of female country artists. The story, dubbed Tomato-gate is further ignited when Hill compares female artists to that of "tomatoes in a salad". In response, Sara Evans, Miranda Lambert, Martina McBride, and Jennifer Nettles criticize Hill's comments via social media.
- June 15 – Country Weekly is rebranded as Nash Country Weekly, as part of a co-branding with Nash FM's radio product.
- June 19 – Almost a year after successfully recovering from cervical cancer, Joey Martin Feek of Joey + Rory is diagnosed with stage IV colorectal cancer.
- June 22 – With "Love Me Like You Mean It", Kelsea Ballerini becomes the first female artist to send her debut single to No. 1 on Country Airplay since Carrie Underwood did in 2006, and the first female artist to do so on an independent label.
- July 9 – Luke Bryan causes controversy in an interview with "HITS Double Daily" for implying that Outlaw country artists (particularly Waylon Jennings, Merle Haggard, and Willie Nelson) spent their career "laying in the gutter, strung out on drugs." Bryan would later call Jennings' widow Jessi Colter, as well as Haggard's son, Ben, to apologize.
- July 18 – "Girl Crush" by Little Big Town makes country music history by breaking the record of weeks spent at number 1 by a group of three or more members, surpassing the current record holders The Browns and their song The Three Bells.
- July 20 – Miranda Lambert and Blake Shelton announce their divorce after four years of marriage.
- August 3 – Reba McEntire announces the separation from long-time husband and manager Narvel Blackstock. Although they will be ending their marriage, they will continue to support one another professionally.
- September 25 – Kenny Rogers announces his plans to retire following a Christmas album and a 2016 farewell tour
- September 27 – Producer Dave Brainard is hospitalized after being found unconscious with a broken jaw from a beating.
- October – Joey Martin Feek of Joey + Rory ends treatment for stage IV colorectal cancer after treatments fail to control growth of tumors.
- November 2 – Chris Cagle announces his retirement from the music business.
- November 4 - Chris Stapleton becomes an overnight sensation after his performance with Justin Timberlake of "Tennessee Whiskey" and "Drink You Away" at the Country Music Association Awards; the performance is considered the best of the show, and one of the best performances in CMA history. Stapleton wins New Artist, Male Vocalist and Album of the Year for Traveller.
- November 9 – Joey Martin Feek of Joey and Rory enters Hospice care after terminal cancer diagnosis
- November 21- Jean Shepard celebrates her 60th Grand Ole Opry anniversary

== Top hits of the year ==
The following songs placed within the Top 20 on the Hot Country Songs, Country Airplay or Canada Country charts in 2015:

=== Singles released by American artists ===
Songs	Airplay	Canada	Single	Artist	References
3	1	10	Ain't Worth the Whiskey	Cole Swindell	
16	10	33	Already Callin' You Mine	Parmalee	
6	3	1	Anything Goes	Florida Georgia Line	
11	3	5	Baby Be My Love Song	Easton Corbin	
3	1	3	Break Up with Him	Old Dominion	
2	3	2	Buy Me a Boat	Chris Janson	
2	1	1	Crash and Burn	Thomas Rhett	
15	9	6	Crushin' It	Brad Paisley	
11	3	10	Diamond Rings and Old Barstools	Tim McGraw with Catherine Dunn	
4	1	1	Don't It	Billy Currington	
3	2	11	Drinking Class	Lee Brice	
9	9	18	Fly	Maddie & Tae	
24	16	17	Freestyle	Lady Antebellum	
21	20	32	Games	Luke Bryan	
1	3	11	Girl Crush	Little Big Town	
7	16	42	God Made Girls	RaeLynn	
4	1	1	Gonna	Blake Shelton	
5	2	2	Gonna Know We Were Here	Jason Aldean	
10	2	16	Gonna Wanna Tonight	Chase Rice	
7	1	9	A Guy Walks Into a Bar	Tyler Farr	
7	1	8	Hell of a Night	Dustin Lynch	
2	1	1	Homegrown	Zac Brown Band	
6	2	11	Homegrown Honey	Darius Rucker	
1	1	2	House Party	Sam Hunt	
1	1	1	I See You	Luke Bryan	
16	—	—	I'd Just Love to Lay You Down	Barrett Baber	
2	1	1	I'm Comin' Over	Chris Young	
24	20	40	I'm to Blame	Kip Moore	
2	2	1	John Cougar, John Deere, John 3:16	Keith Urban	
5	1	2	Just Gettin' Started	Jason Aldean	
1	1	1	Kick the Dust Up	Luke Bryan	
10	1	13	Kiss You in the Morning	Michael Ray	
25	17	—	Kiss You Tonight	David Nail	
9	2	8	Let Me See Ya Girl	Cole Swindell	
9	3	6	Like a Cowboy	Randy Houser	
6	11	32	Like a Wrecking Ball	Eric Church	
5	16	22	Little Red Wagon	Miranda Lambert	
6	2	7	Little Toy Guns	Carrie Underwood	
4	2	5	Lonely Eyes	Chris Young	
2	1	1	Lonely Tonight	Blake Shelton featuring Ashley Monroe	
23	16	34	Long Stretch of Love	Lady Antebellum	
2	1	2	Lose My Mind	Brett Eldredge	
19	33	—	Love Is Your Name	Steven Tyler	
5	1	3	Love Me Like You Mean It	Kelsea Ballerini	
6	1	20	Love You Like That	Canaan Smith	
4	1	2	Loving You Easy	Zac Brown Band	
2	1	11	Make Me Wanna	Thomas Rhett	
4	1	3	Mean to Me	Brett Eldredge	
1	—	—	My Baby's Got a Smile on Her Face	Craig Wayne Boyd	
5	1	4	Nothin' Like You	Dan + Shay	
5	1	16	One Hell of an Amen	Brantley Gilbert	
4	1	1	Perfect Storm	Brad Paisley	
8	1	1	Raise 'Em Up	Keith Urban featuring Eric Church	
17	17	23	Real Life	Jake Owen	
27	20	—	Riot	Rascal Flatts	
17	11	—	Run Away with You	Big & Rich	
3	1	1	Sangria	Blake Shelton	
4	1	1	Save It for a Rainy Day	Kenny Chesney	
5	1	4	Say You Do	Dierks Bentley	
15	14	28	She Don't Love You	Eric Paslay	
3	1	1	Sippin' on Fire	Florida Georgia Line	
5	1	1	Smoke	A Thousand Horses	
4	2	1	Smoke Break	Carrie Underwood	
1	3	3	Something in the Water	Carrie Underwood	
1	1	1	Strip It Down	Luke Bryan	
3	1	2	Sun Daze	Florida Georgia Line	
16	9	19	Take It On Back	Chase Bryant	
1	1	2	Take Your Time	Sam Hunt	
2	1	1	Talladega	Eric Church	
1	59	—	Tennessee Whiskey	Chris Stapleton	
8	1	1	Til It's Gone	Kenny Chesney	
6	1	1	Tonight Looks Good on You	Jason Aldean	
11	5	6	Top of the World	Tim McGraw	
17	—	—	Traveller	Chris Stapleton	
19	14	30	What We Ain't Got	Jake Owen	
9	1	3	Wild Child	Kenny Chesney featuring Grace Potter	
8	1	3	Young & Crazy	Frankie Ballard	

=== Singles released by Canadian artists ===
Songs	Airplay	Canada	Single	Artist	References
—	—	1	Airwaves	Brett Kissel	
—	—	6	Before You Drive Me Crazy	Wes Mack	
—	—	4	Blame	Autumn Hill	
—	—	7	Bring Down the House	Dean Brody	
—	—	5	Cheap Seats	Dallas Smith	
—	—	6	Country Side	Jason Blaine	
—	—	3	Don't Let Her Be Gone	Gord Bamford	
—	—	20	Go Back	Leah Daniels	
—	—	7	Gone Long Gone	Jason Benoit	
—	—	17	Groovin' with You	Gord Bamford	
—	—	7	I'm an Open Road	Paul Brandt featuring Jess Moskaluke	
—	—	10	It's All Good	Jojo Mason	
—	—	14	Just Like Love	Steven Lee Olsen	
—	—	7	Kiss Me Quiet	Jess Moskaluke	
—	—	5	Lifted	Dallas Smith	
—	—	5	Make You Mine	High Valley	
—	—	20	Moonshine	Alee	
—	—	17	Night We Won't Forget	Jess Moskaluke	
—	—	17	Nothing	Paul Brandt	
—	—	7	Our Town	Cold Creek County	
—	57	3	Raised by a Good Time	Steven Lee Olsen	
—	—	19	Shake It If Ya Got It	Kira Isabella	
—	—	10	She Don't Drink Whiskey Anymore	Tim Hicks	
—	—	6	She's with Me	High Valley	
—	—	8	So Do I	Tim Hicks	
—	—	5	Something You Just Don't Forget	Brett Kissel	
—	—	15	Till the Wheels Come Off	Cold Creek County	
—	—	13	Undressed	Bobby Wills	
—	—	5	Upside Down	Dean Brody	
—	—	1	Wastin' Gas	Dallas Smith	
—	—	12	The Way You Let Me Down	Wes Mack	
—	—	16	When the Buzz Wears Off	Tebey	
—	—	11	When the Lights Go Down	Chad Brownlee	
—	—	9	Who We Are	Emerson Drive	
—	—	11	Young, Alive and In Love	Tim Hicks	

== Top new album releases ==
The following albums placed on the Top Country Albums charts in 2015:

US	Album	Artist	Record label	Release date	Reference
6	4X4 (EP)	Granger Smith	Pioneer Music	May 5	
8	35 Biggest Hits	Tim McGraw	Curb	June 16	
2	35 MPH Town	Toby Keith	Show Dog-Universal	October 9	
1	About to Get Real	Easton Corbin	Mercury Nashville	June 30	
1	Angels and Alcohol	Alan Jackson	ACR/EMI Nashville	July 17	
7	Between the Pines	Sam Hunt	MCA Nashville	October 27	
2	The Blade	Ashley Monroe	Warner Bros. Nashville	July 24	
4	Bronco	Canaan Smith	Mercury Nashville	June 23	
4	Buy Me a Boat	Chris Janson	Warner Bros. Nashville	October 30	
1	Cass County	Don Henley	Capitol	September 25	
7	Closer (EP)	Kane Brown	Kane Brown	June 2	
1	Cold Beer Conversation	George Strait	MCA Nashville	September 25	
4	Country Evolution	Home Free	Columbia Nashville	September 18	
3	Damn Country Music	Tim McGraw	Big Machine	November 6	
1	Django & Jimmie	Willie Nelson and Merle Haggard	Legacy	June 2	
2	Elvis Forever	Elvis Presley	USPS/RCA	August 12	
10	Elvis: Ultimate Christmas	Elvis Presley	RCA	November 6	
4	The First Time	Kelsea Ballerini	Black River	May 19	
9	Front Row Seat	Josh Abbott Band	Pretty Damn Tough	November 6	
10	Happy Prisoner: The Bluegrass Sessions	Robert Earl Keen	Dualtone	February 10	
9	HippieLovePunk	Cody Canada and the Departed	Underground Sound	January 13	
10	Hits & Hymns	Jimmy Fortune	Gaither Music Group	October 23	
4	Hold My Beer Vol. 1	Wade Bowen and Randy Rogers	Lil' Buddy Toons	April 20	
1	Holding All the Roses	Blackberry Smoke	Rounder	February 10	
5	Home	Pat Green	Greenhorse	August 14	
1	I'm Comin' Over	Chris Young	RCA Nashville	November 13	
1	Illinois	Brett Eldredge	Atlantic	September 11	
1	Jekyll + Hyde	Zac Brown Band	Southern Ground/Big Machine	April 28	
1	Kill the Lights	Luke Bryan	Capitol Nashville	August 7	
1	Love Somebody	Reba McEntire	Nash Icon	April 14	
7	Me (EP)	RaeLynn	Valory Music Group	January 13	
3	Meat and Candy	Old Dominion	RCA Nashville	November 6	
4	Michael Ray	Michael Ray	Warner Bros. Nashville	August 7	
5	Mono	The Mavericks	Valory Music Group	February 17	
2	Mr. Misunderstood	Eric Church	EMI Nashville	November 3	
3	The Music of Nashville: Season 3, Volume 2	Various Artists	Big Machine	May 12	
3	Nashville: On the Record, Volume 2	Various Artists	Big Machine	March 24	
3	NOW That's What I Call ACM Awards 50 Years	Various Artists	Universal	March 31	
8	NOW That's What I Call Country Christmas	Various Artists	Universal	October 23	
1	NOW That's What I Call Country Volume 8	Various Artists	Universal	June 9	
3	Outlaw in Me	The Lacs	Backroad	May 26	
1	Pageant Material	Kacey Musgraves	Mercury Nashville	June 23	
4	Precious Memories Collection	Alan Jackson	Arista Nashville	November 6	
2	Reloaded: 20 #1 Hits	Blake Shelton	Warner Bros. Nashville	October 23	
2	Second Hand Heart	Dwight Yoakam	Warner Bros. Nashville	April 14	
1	Something More Than Free	Jason Isbell	Southeastern	July 17	
2	Southern Drawl	Alabama	BMG Chrysalis North America	September 18	
1	Southern Style	Darius Rucker	Capitol Nashville	March 31	
3	Southernality	A Thousand Horses	Republic Nashville	June 9	
1	Spring Break...Checkin' Out	Luke Bryan	Capitol Nashville	March 10	
5	Spring Break...The Set List: The Complete Spring Break Collection ZinePak	Luke Bryan	Capitol Nashville	March 10	
2	Start Here	Maddie & Tae	Dot	August 28	
2	Still the One: Live from Vegas	Shania Twain	Mercury Nashville	March 3	
1	Storyteller	Carrie Underwood	Arista Nashville	October 23	
2	Suffer in Peace	Tyler Farr	Columbia Nashville	April 28	
3	Summer Forever	Billy Currington	Mercury Nashville	June 2	
2	Tangled Up	Thomas Rhett	Valory Music Group	September 25	
3	Terraplane	Steve Earle	New West	February 17	
3	Thirty One	Jana Kramer	Warner Music Nashville	October 9	
9	Today Is Christmas	LeAnn Rimes	Kobalt	October 16	
8	The Traveling Kind	Emmylou Harris and Rodney Crowell	Nonesuch	May 12	
1	Traveller	Chris Stapleton	Mercury Nashville	May 5	
3	The Turnpike Troubadours	Turnpike Troubadours	Bossier City	September 18	
1	The Underdog	Aaron Watson	Big Label	February 17	
2	Untamed	Cam	Arista Nashville/RCA	December 11	
2	Wild Ones	Kip Moore	MCA Nashville	August 21	

=== Other top albums ===
US	Album	Artist	Record label	Release date	Reference
16	The 21 Project	Hunter Hayes	Atlantic	November 6	
16	35 Biggest Hits	Hank Williams, Jr.	Curb	June 16	
40	717	Jason Cassidy	JC Music	May 19	
28	Alive! In Concert	Dailey & Vincent	Cracker Barrel	April 27	
30	All-Time Greatest Hits	LeAnn Rimes	Curb	February 3	
14	Answer to No One: The Colt Ford Classics	Colt Ford	Average Joes	October 23	
16	The Average Joes DJ's Present: Mud in the Club, Volume 1	Various Artists	Average Joes	March 3	
26	The B-Sides, 2011–2014 (EP)	Jon Pardi	Capitol Nashville	May 19	
49	Bittersweet	Kasey Chambers	Sugar Hill	July 24	
13	Blacked Out	Moonshine Bandits	Backroad	July 17	
27	Bottom of the Fifth (EP)	Curtis Grimes	Curtis Grimes	August 21	
12	Bringin' It Home (EP)	Big Smo	Elektra Nashville	June 16	
16	Canaan Smith (EP)	Canaan Smith	Mercury Nashville	March 24	
20	Change: The Lost Record Vol. 1 – EP	Josh Thompson	Ole	October 9	
29	Cheatham County (EP)	Upchurch	Black Fly	May 12	
26	Christmas Time	Rhonda Vincent	Upper Management	October 30	
31	Clare Dunn (EP)	Clare Dunn	MCA Nashville	September 18	
49	Classic #1 Hits	Buck Owens	Cracker Barrel/Omnivore		
39	Cole Taylor	Cole Taylor	Cole Taylor	March 3	
23	Country Faith Christmas	Various Artists	Word/Curb	September 25	
11	Down Home Sessions II	Cole Swindell	Warner Bros. Nashville	November 6	
26	Down to Believing	Allison Moorer	eOne	March 17	
28	Dylan, Cash and the New Nashville Cats: A New Music City	Various Artists	Legacy	June 16	
39	Faded Gloryville	Lindi Ortega	Last Gang	August 7	
42	Firewater	Redneck Souljers	Play Make Believe	November 6	
23	Fix (EP)	Chris Lane	Big Loud Mountain	November 13	
13	Folks Like Us	Montgomery Gentry	Blaster	June 9	
37	Forever Changed	T. Graham Brown	Mansion	January 27	
19	Genuine: The Alan Jackson Story	Alan Jackson	Arista Nashville/Legacy	November 6	
15	Glen Campbell: I'll Be Me	Various Artists	Big Machine	February 17	
36	Goldmine	John Anderson	Bayou Boys Music	May 26	
45	The Good Fight	Cory Morrow	Write On	June 16	
28	Greatest Hits	Rodney Atkins	Curb	February 3	
41	Gulf Coast Time (EP)	Roger Creager	Fun All Wrong	September 25	
30	Hard to Please	The Black Lillies	Black Lilly	October 2	
44	Her (EP)	Blaire Hanks	Perfect Storm	June 30	
49	Hymns & Gospel Favorites	Loretta Lynn	Gaither Music Group	April 14	
38	I Love This Life (EP)	LoCash	Reviver	October 30	
44	Jake Worthington (EP)	Jake Worthington	W3	October 16	
25	Jon Langston (EP)	Jon Langston	Jon Langston	December 11	
32	Just One Look: Classic Linda Ronstadt	Linda Ronstadt	Rhino	August 21	
37	Kiss You in the Morning EP	Michael Ray	Warner Bros. Nashville	April 28	
42	Larry Campbell & Teresa Williams	Larry Campbell & Teresa Williams	Red House	June 23	
28	Lauren Alaina (EP)	Lauren Alaina	19/Interscope/Mercury Nashville	October 2	
22	Maren Morris (EP)	Maren Morris	Columbia Nashville	November 6	
33	Mixtape	JB and the Moonshine Band	Light It Up	June 30	
18	Mixtape: 'Til Summer's Gone (EP)	Lee Brice	Curb	July 17	
15	Mud Digger, Volume 6	Various Artists	Average Joes	August 28	
17	The Music of Nashville: Season 4, Volume 1	Various Artists	Big Machine	December 4	
25	Natural Man	Jon Wolfe	Fool Hearted	March 31	
25	Nothing but the Silence	Striking Matches	I.R.S. Nashville	March 24	
13	On Purpose	Clint Black	Thirty Tigers/Black Top	September 25	
26	On the Other Hand: All the Number Ones	Randy Travis	Warner Bros. Nashville	April 21	
17	Once Again It's Christmas	Kenny Rogers	Warner Bros. Nashville	September 25	
43	Panhandle Rambler	Joe Ely	Rack'em	September 18	
12	Paradise	The Wood Brothers	Honey Jar	October 2	
32	Pawn Shop Guitar (EP)	Logan Mize	Arista Nashville	May 19	
14	Ralph Stanley & Friends: Man of Constant Sorrow	Ralph Stanley	Cracker Barrel	January 19	
45	The Right Combination	Porter Wagoner and Dolly Parton	Sony/Cracker Barrel		
18	Ringling Road	William Clark Green	Bill Grease	April 21	
26	Rock of Ages: Hymns and Gospel Favorites	The Oak Ridge Boys	Gaither Music Group	May 26	
26	Showtime (EP)	Jon Langston	Treehouse	May 5	
37	Shuteye	Logan Brill	Carnival	June 2	
15	Small Town Dreams	Will Hoge	Cumberland	April 7	
27	Something in the Water	Pokey LaFarge	Rounder	April 7	
30	Sonic Ranch	Whitey Morgan and the 78's	Whitey Morgan	May 19	
16	Southern Gravity	Kristian Bush	Streamsound	April 7	
11	Squelch	Jason Boland & The Stragglers	Proud Souls	October 9	
39	The State I'm In	Leigh Nash	One Son	September 18	
11	Still the King: Celebrating the Music of Bob Wills and His Texas Playboys	Asleep at the Wheel	Bismeaux	March 3	
31	Texas Like That	Zane Williams	Be Music & Entertainment	April 14	
37	Things That Can't Be Undone	Corb Lund	New West	October 9	
16	This Christmas (EP)	Jessie James Decker	Big Yellow Dog	December 4	
36	This One's for You (EP)	Luke Combs	Luke Combs	November 27	
13	Three	Gloriana	Emblem/Warner Bros.	June 2	
34	Torn (EP)	Backroad Anthem	Backroad Anthem	September 4	
11	Turn It On (EP)	Eli Young Band	Republic Nashville	March 10	
22	Us Time	Stoney LaRue	eOne	October 16	
46	Walkin a Wire	Pete Scobell Band	FrogBonz	September 11	
31	Welcome to Cam Country (EP)	Cam	Arista Nashville/RCA	March 31	
37	What Color Is Your Sky	Jason Michael Carroll	Kickstarter	May 5	
23	While the Gettin' Is Good	Corey Smith	Sugar Hill	June 23	
26	Whiskey on My Breath	Love and Theft	Hate & Purchase Music	February 10	
39	Willie Nelson and Friends	Willie Nelson	Cracker Barrel		

== Deaths ==
- January 2 – Little Jimmy Dickens, 94, Grand Ole Opry member best known for "May the Bird of Paradise Fly Up Your Nose", "Take an Old Cold Tater (and Wait)", and standing at only 4.2 feet tall, as well as for his cameos in videos by artists such as Brad Paisley and Vince Gill. (cardiac arrest)
- January 12 – A. J. Masters, 64, singer-songwriter (prostate cancer)
- January 16 – Dixie Hall, 80, bluegrass songwriter and wife of Country Music Hall of Fame member Tom T. Hall (brain tumor)
- January 17 – Don Harron, 90, Canadian comedian and playwright best known to country audiences as "Charlie Farquharson" on television's Hee Haw (cancer).
- March 9 – Wayne Kemp, 74, writer of Johnny Cash's "One Piece at a Time" among others; also a recording artist for MCA Nashville (various ailments)
- April 30 – Steven Goldmann, 53, music video director who directed a plethora of videos for many acts in the 90's and 2000's. (cancer)
- May 18 – Elbert West, 46, singer-songwriter
- June 11 – Jim Ed Brown, 81, Grand Ole Opry star and member of The Browns (cancer)
- July 20 – Wayne Carson, 72, writer of Elvis Presley's "Always on My Mind," later covered by Willie Nelson
- July 22 – Daron Norwood, 49, country singer from the 1990s
- July 29 – Buddy Emmons, 78, steel guitarist
- July 30 – Lynn Anderson, 67, singer best known for the 1970 crossover hit "Rose Garden." (heart attack)
- August 4 – Billy Sherrill, 78, record producer best known for his work with George Jones and Tammy Wynette
- September 4 – Hal Willis, 82, Canadian singer-songwriter, best known for the song "The Lumberjack"
- September 25 – Hugh Wright, 63, drummer for Boy Howdy (natural causes)
- October 6 – Billy Joe Royal, 73, country and rock singer best known for his hits "Down in the Boondocks" and "Tell It Like It Is"
- October 17 – John Jennings, 62, record producer and guitarist best known for his work with Mary Chapin Carpenter (kidney cancer)
- November 2 – Tommy Overstreet, 78, country singer from the 1970s
- November 8 – Charlie Dick, 81, widower of Patsy Cline who helped keep alive her legacy in the decades following her death; became a record promoter and publisher in his own right
- November 15 – Ron Hynes, 64, Canadian country-folk artist, best known for the songs "Sonny's Dream" and "Cryer's Paradise" (cancer)
- December 6 – Don Chapel, songwriter of hits by George Jones, Conway Twitty, ex-wife Tammy Wynette, and others
- December 7 – Don Pfrimmer, 78, songwriter known for co-writing many modern hits including "Meet in the Middle" and "My Front Porch Looking In" (leukemia)

== Hall of Fame inductees ==
=== Bluegrass Music Hall of Fame Inductees ===
- Larry Sparks
- Bill Keith

=== Country Music Hall of Fame inductees ===
- Jim Ed Brown and The Browns (Jim Ed (1934–2015), Bonnie (1937–2016); and Maxine (1932–2019).
- Grady Martin (1929–2001)
- The Oak Ridge Boys (multiple members – currently Duane Allen (born 1943), Joe Bonsall (born 1948), William Lee Golden (born 1939) and Richard Sterban (born 1943)).

=== Canadian Country Music Hall of Fame inductees ===
- Dianne Leigh
- Elizabeth "Ma" Henning

== Major awards ==
=== Academy of Country Music ===
(presented April 3, 2016 in Las Vegas)

- Entertainer of the Year – Jason Aldean
- Top Male Vocalist – Chris Stapleton
- Top Female Vocalist – Miranda Lambert
- Top Vocal Group – Little Big Town
- Top Vocal Duo – Florida Georgia Line
- New Male Vocalist – Chris Stapleton
- New Female Vocalist – Kelsea Ballerini
- New Vocal Duo or Group – Old Dominion
- Album of the Year – Traveller, Chris Stapleton
- Single Record of the Year – "Die a Happy Man", Thomas Rhett
- Song of the Year – "Nobody to Blame", Chris Stapleton
- Video of the Year – "Mr. Misunderstood", Eric Church
- Vocal Event of the Year – "Smokin' and Drinkin'", Miranda Lambert feat. Little Big Town

ACM Honors

- Career Achievement Award – Alabama
- Crystal Milestone Award – Loretta Lynn
- Gene Weed Special Achievement Award – Luke Bryan
- Jim Reeves International Award – Eric Church
- Mae Boren Axton Award – Barry Adelman
- Mae Boren Axton Award – Tim DuBois
- Poet's Award – Bob McDill
- Poet's Award – Felice and Boudleaux Bryant
- Songwriter of the Year – Luke Laird

=== Americana Music Honors & Awards ===
- Album of the Year – Down Where the Spirit Meets the Bone (Lucinda Williams)
- Artist of the Year – Sturgill Simpson
- Duo/Group of the Year – The Mavericks
- Song of the Year – "Turtles All the Way Down" (Sturgill Simpson)
- Emerging Artist of the Year – Shakey Graves
- Instrumentalist of the Year – John Leventhal
- Spirit of Americana/Free Speech Award – Buffy Sainte-Marie
- Lifetime Achievement: Trailblazer – Don Henley
- Lifetime Achievement: Songwriting – Gillian Welch and David Rawlings
- Lifetime Achievement: Performance – Los Lobos
- Lifetime Achievement: Instrumentalist – Ricky Skaggs

=== American Music Awards ===
(presented November 22 in Los Angeles)

- Favorite Country Male Artist – Luke Bryan
- Favorite Country Female Artist – Carrie Underwood
- Favorite Country Band/Duo/Group – Florida Georgia Line
- Favorite Country Album – Anything Goes, Florida Georgia Line

=== ARIA Awards ===
(presented in Sydney on November 26, 2015)

- Best Country Album – All Hell Breaks Loose (Shane Nicholson)

=== Canadian Country Music Association ===
(presented September 13 in Halifax)

- Fans' Choice Award – Johnny Reid
- Male Artist of the Year – Gord Bamford
- Female Artist of the Year – Jess Moskaluke
- Group or Duo of the Year – High Valley
- Songwriter(s) of the Year – "Where a Farm Used to Be", written by Gord Bamford, Buddy Owens and Phil O'Donnell
- Single of the Year – "Where a Farm Used to Be", Gord Bamford
- Album of the Year – Lifted, Dallas Smith
- Top Selling Album – Crash My Party, Luke Bryan
- Top Selling Canadian Album – Yoan, Yoan
- CMT Video of the Year – "Upside Down", Dean Brody
- Rising Star Award – Madeline Merlo
- Roots Artist or Group of the Year – Lindi Ortega
- Interactive Artist of the Year – Brett Kissel

=== Country Music Association ===
(presented November 4 in Nashville)

- Single of the Year – "Girl Crush", Little Big Town
- Song of the Year – "Girl Crush", Liz Rose, Hillary Lindsey, Lori McKenna
- Vocal Group of the Year – Little Big Town
- New Artist of the Year – Chris Stapleton
- Album of the Year – Traveller, Chris Stapleton
- Musician of the Year – Mac McAnally
- Vocal Duo of the Year – Florida Georgia Line
- Music Video of the Year – "Girl in a Country Song", Maddie & Tae
- Male Vocalist of the Year – Chris Stapleton
- Female Vocalist of the Year – Miranda Lambert
- Musical Event of the Year – "Raise 'Em Up", Keith Urban and Eric Church
- Entertainer of the Year – Luke Bryan

=== CMT Music Awards ===
(presented June 10 in Nashville)

- Video of the Year – "Something in the Water", Carrie Underwood
- Male Video of the Year – "Play It Again", Luke Bryan
- Female Video of the Year – "Something in the Water", Carrie Underwood
- Group Video of the Year – "Bartender", Lady Antebellum
- Duo Video of the Year – "Dirt", Florida Georgia Line
- Breakthrough Video of the Year – "Leave the Night On", Sam Hunt
- Collaborative Video of the Year – "Somethin' Bad", Miranda Lambert with Carrie Underwood
- Performance of the Year – "Turn the Page", Bob Seger and Jason Aldean from CMT Crossroads

CMT Artists of the Year
(presented on December 2, 2015)

- Luke Bryan
- Florida Georgia Line
- Sam Hunt
- Little Big Town
- Blake Shelton

=== Grammy Awards ===
(presented February 15, 2016 in Los Angeles)

- Best Country Solo Performance – "Traveller" (Chris Stapleton)
- Best Country Duo/Group Performance – "Girl Crush" (Little Big Town)
- Best Country Song – "Girl Crush" (Hillary Lindsey, Lori McKenna, Liz Rose)
- Best Country Album – Traveller (Chris Stapleton)
- Best Bluegrass Album – The Muscle Shoals Recordings (The SteelDrivers)
- Best Americana Album – Something More Than Free (Jason Isbell)
- Best American Roots Song – "24 Frames" (Jason Isbell)
- Best American Roots Performance – "See That My Grave Is Kept Clean" (Mavis Staples)
- Best Roots Gospel Album – Still Rockin' My Soul (The Fairfield Four)

=== Juno Awards ===
(presented April 3, 2016 in Calgary)

- Country Album of the Year – Gypsy Road, Dean Brody

== Other links ==
- Country Music Association
- Inductees of the Country Music Hall of Fame
