= Cale Dodds =

American singer-songwriter

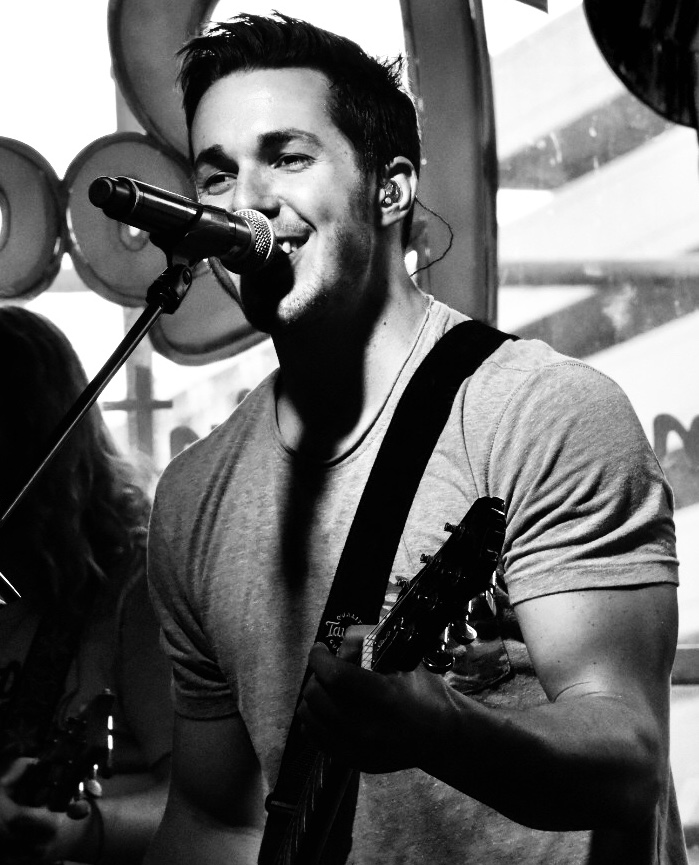

Background information
- Born: Cale Dodds; May 27, 1988 (age 37); Columbus, Georgia, United States
- Origin: Nashville, Tennessee, United States
- Genres: Country, Pop Punk (early)
- Occupations: Singer; songwriter
- Years active: 2002-present
- Labels: Warner Music Nashville
- Formerly of: Lakeside
- Website: caledodds.com

Cale Dodds is an American country music artist and songwriter who is currently signed to Spirit Music Group.

== Musical career ==
Cale Dodds has been writing songs since the age of 12. At the age of 22, after attending Columbus State University, Dodds made the move from Columbus, GA to Nashville, TN to pursue his career in music. In 2014, Cale released his first EP titled “Wild and Wreckless”—a five-song project recorded at Ocean Way Studio with Kyle Jacobs and Matt McClure. In 2015, Dodds received a cut from A Thousand Horses for his song “Drunk Dial,” which reached number 23 on Billboards's Country Airplay Chart; and in 2016, Warner/Chappell Music signed Dodds to a worldwide publishing agreement. In March 2016, Dodds independently released his second project, "People Watching - EP", produced by Corey Crowder and Zach Abend. Since the release, his songs "People Watching" and "Lying" have been streamed over 5 million times, and “Acting Our Age,” was selected for the EA Sports Madden ‘17 soundtrack which also featured artists such as Blake Shelton and Brantley Gilbert.

Cale has also been tour support for artists like Sam Hunt, Brett Eldredge, and Billy Currington

In January 2017, Cale Dodds joined Warner Music Nashville. Later that year, in September, Dodds released his first major label "double"—a two-sided single—featuring "All Over" and "Lying." The second double followed in November with "Out Of My System" and "People Watching," and the third in January 2018 with Cale's radio single "Take You Back" and "Like We Do."

"Take You Back" arrived to country music radio in March, but prior to hitting the airwaves, Rolling Stone had already named Cale Dodds one of their November 2017 "New Country Artists You Need To Know." CMT Listen Up revealed him as one of their "18 for 2018" class members—a year-long campaign that spotlights "country music's most promising newcomers." Billboard and Rolling Stone both named Dodd's 2018 CMA Fest performance as one of the best things they saw from the four-day music festival.

In early October 2018, Cale Dodds shared new music with a studio and acoustic version of his song, "What We Gonna Do About It;" and followed with another two versions of "Where I Get It From" which was released in November of that same year.

Most recently, in March 2019, Dodds released his current single "I Like Where This Is Going"—a song written with hit writers Nicolle Galyon and Busbee about "anticipation" and seeing "the uncertainty of what’s going to happen, while having faith that it’s going to unfold in the right way."

== Discography ==
=== Extended plays ===
Title	Details
Wild & Wreckless	Release date: May 7, 2014; Label: Independent; Format: Digital
People Watching - EP	Release date: March 4, 2016; Label: Independent; Format: Digital

=== Singles ===
Year	Single
2018	"Take You Back"
2019	"I Like Where This Is Going"
2021	"You Shouldn’t Have"
2021	"Doin' It Right"

=== Music videos ===
Year	Title	Director
2018	"Take You Back"	Jack Guy
2018	"What We Gonna Do About It"	Dustin Haney
2018	"Where I Get It From"	Dustin Haney

=== Songwriter Features ===
Artist	Album	Song title	Year	Peak Chart Positions		
Artist	Album	Song title	Year	US Country	US Country Airplay	CAN Country
Austin Jenckes	"An American Story"	"Sound of Love"	2012			
Austin Jenckes	"An American Story"	"Wild and Wreckless"	2012			
Jared Porter	"East To West"	"Kings and Queens"	2014			
Jess Moskaluke	"Light Up The Night"	"Night We Won't Forget"	2014			17
Jess Moskaluke	"Light Up The Night"	"When He's Drunk"	2014			
Jess Moskaluke	"Kiss Me Quiet"	"Good For You"	2015			
A Thousand Horses	Southernality	"(This Ain't No) Drunk Dial"	2015	30	23	50
Filmore	"Proof"	"Typical"	2016			
Lit	"These Are The Days"	"Good Problem to Have"	2018			
Lit	"These Are The Days"	"I Could Be Wrong"	2018			
Chase Rice	"The Album"	"Drinkin' Beer. Talkin' God. Amen."	2020		1	
Chris Young		"All Dogs Go to Heaven"	2023			

== Television work ==
Year	Series	Role
2015-2016	I Love Kellie Pickler	Himself
2022	"I Like Where This is Going" Music Video appears in The Special One (Beavis and Butt-Head)	
