= Tomatogate =

2015 scandal regarding gender discrimination in country music

Tomatogate (also called SaladGate (Note: Compare for example terminology used by The Guardian.)) was a 2015 controversy in country music, stemming from comments made by radio consultant Keith Hill to the country radio trade publication Country Aircheck, regarding the under-representation of women in the playlists of country music radio stations. Hill advocated that stations not play songs by women artists back-to-back, and drew an analogy with the composition of a salad, with male artists as the lettuce, and female artists as the tomato garnish. The comments sparked broad outcry on social media and from a number of high profile female artists and others in the industry. It resulted in various measures aimed at addressing the gender gap in country music; however, despite the attention it garnered, subsequent investigation indicated that the gap had worsened in the years following the incident.

== Origin ==
The controversy surrounding Tomatogate originated in comments made by radio consultant Keith Hill to the country radio trade publication Country Radio Aircheck in May 2015. (Note: At least one source dated the interview in March, rather than May. However the original publication containing the interview was dated May 26, 2015. It's not clear whether this may haven an error, or if the interview itself may have been conducted in March, but not published until may. Although the original publication does not appear to indicate any difference in interview date and publication date.) Hill opined that country music radio stations should not include consecutive songs by women in their playlists. Drawing an analogy with the composition of a salad, Hill remarked:

If you want to make ratings in country radio, take females out. The reason is mainstream country radio generates more quarter hours from female listeners at the rate of 70 to 75 percent, and women like male artists. The expectation is we're principally a male format with a smaller female component. I've got about 40 music databases in front of me, and the percentage of females in the one with the most is 19 percent. Trust me, I play great female records, and we've got some right now; they're just not the lettuce in our salad. The lettuce is Luke Bryan and Blake Shelton, Keith Urban and artists like that. The tomatoes of our salad are the females.

== Reactions ==
Hill's comments drew widespread condemnation, especially on social media and from women in the country music industry, including Jennifer Nettles, (Note: Nettles stated via Twitter, "Don't worry babe. I see an opportunity here. (A) big ole vagina-shaped opportunity.) Martina McBride, (Note: McBride stated, "I was taken aback by the comments in the article. I felt them to be sexist and condescending toward female artists ... I feel like the more these ideas and philosophies are allowed to perpetuate, the harder it is to keep them from becoming a self-fulfilling prophecy when it comes to labels investing in female acts, writers writing great songs for females, and radio giving them a fair shot.) Miranda Lambert (Note: Lambert stated via Twitter, "This is the biggest bunch of BULLSHIT I have ever heard. I am gonna do everything in my power to support and promote female singer/songwriters in country music. Always.) and Leslie Fram. (Note: Fram stated, "I can tell you that working and programming radio for over 20 years, this is simply not true. Top 40 is primarily a female format and the majority of artists on their chart are women. This posting is taking us 20 steps backwards. It's an insult to every female artist in the format.) (Note: Other noteworthy individuals involved, as listed by The Washington Post included Kacey Musgraves, Terri Clark, Jana Kramer, Maggie Rose, Kelsea Ballerini, Jennifer Nettles, Maddie & Tae, Brandy Clark and Kellie Pickler.) The reaction drew general attention on the issue of gender inequality in country music. In the following CMA Music Festival in June, t-shirts were sold bearing slogans such as "Let the Tomatoes Play", and Martina McBride announced she would sell a "tomato" t-shirt for women, and "tomato lover" for men, with the proceeds going to benefit her charitable foundation, Team Martina. The scandal was the topic of discussion in a panel at the show Next Women of Country, hosted at the Country Music Hall of Fame and Museum. Nashville based artist Kalie Shorr penned her 2016 single "Fight Like a Girl" in response to Tomato-gate, as she told the Chicago Tribune, to "handle being pissed off".

The issue became popular online, using the hashtag #TomatoGate, and a range of efforts were introduced to address the gender gap, introduce new women artists, and publicize existing acts. Among these, industry executive Todd Cassetty founded the program Song Suffragettes based in Nashville, to highlight new and emerging women singers and songwriters, and radio personality Bobby Bones announced the launch of an hour program dedicated to female country artists.

However, in a follow up piece by The Tennessean three years later, the paper reported that despite "hope that bringing the issue to the surface would yield progress. It hasn't. In fact, by some metrics, women have lost ground in country music." This included the fact that from 2016 to 2017, the proportion of songs by female artists charted by Country Aircheck had dropped from 13% to 10.4%.

=== Hill's response ===
Hill reported receiving online harassment and death threats following the incident, and later clarified to The Tennessean that his comments were tied to increasing the perception of variety among listeners in order to increase listening, saying "As verboten and as blasphemous as that is, it is the gravity of the purchasing behavior of the users or listeners of a free radio product." He later told Variety that the analogy had "had no genderized bias embedded", and that in a meritocratic industry, "if women really wanted to hear more women, that's what [Country music radio stations would] be giving them".

He elaborated further in an interview with Country Music Television, defending his remarks as being, as one author summarized, "hard-boiled: the clear-eyed perspective of country radio's goal to sell records" rather than advocating for social change:

The producers of country music all want to sell a lot of records. They don’t want to sell just a few. And they aren’t personally motivated by wanting to get women back on the air or wanting to get the banjo back on the radio. They’d would make Balinese gong records backwards if they sold the most ... I’ve been in radio for 42 years, and I’ve made money out of figuring out what makes radio ratings go up. I make a very good living. I’m just sharing what I’ve uncovered.

== See also ==
- 2015 in country music
- List of -gate scandals and controversies
- Occupational segregation
- Occupational sexism
- Women in music
