= Our Town (disambiguation) =

Our Town is a play by Thornton Wilder.

Our Town may also refer to:

== Film and television ==
- Our Town (1940 film), adaptation of the play starring William Holden and Martha Scott
- Our Town (2003 film), adaptation of the play starring Paul Newman
- Our Town (television), 1955 television adaptation on Producers' Showcase
  - Our Town (opera), adaptation by composer Ned Rorem
- Our Town (television), 1977 television adaptation on NBC
- Our Town (2007 film), South Korean film
- "Our Town" (The Vampire Diaries), a 2012 television episode
- "Our Town" (The X-Files), a 1995 television episode
- "Our Town" (Young Americans), a 2000 television episode

== Music ==
- "Our Town", an orchestral suite by Aaron Copland taken from the 1940 film
- "Our Town" (Cold Creek County song)
- "Our Town" (James Taylor song), from the 2006 Disney/Pixar animated film Cars
- "Our Town", a song by Marshall Crenshaw
- "Our Town", a song by Iris DeMent from her 1992 album Infamous Angel
- Our Town - The Greatest Hits, an album by Deacon Blue

== Places ==
- Our Town, Alabama
- Ourtown, Wisconsin

== See also ==
- OT: Our Town, a 2002 documentary film
