= American Soul (disambiguation) =

American Soul may refer to:

- American Soul, a television series
- "American Soul", song from Songs of Experience (U2 album)
- American Soul, an album by Mick Hucknall
- American Soul, an album by Aaron Watson
