= We Got Us =

Single by Canaan Smith
- Released: January 24, 2012
- Recorded: 2011–12
- Genre: Country
- Length: 3:50
- Label: Mercury Nashville
- Songwriter(s): Canaan Smith; Stephen Barker Liles; Tommy Lee James
- Producer(s): Brett Beavers

Canaan Smith singles chronology
"We Got Us" (2012)	"Love You Like That" (2014)

"We Got Us" is the debut single by American country music singer Canaan Smith, released in January 2012. Smith co-wrote the song with Stephen Barker Liles and Tommy Lee James.

== Critical reception ==
Matt Bjorke of Roughstock gave the song a positive review, saying that "Vocally, Canaan has a strong tenor as he sings lyrics which discuss a man who knows times may be hard for him and his new love but with love as their anchor, they’re ready to take the leap and make a commitment to each other and that despite having nothing but each other, that love will be enough to pull them through any tough times they’ll encounter along the way.

== Music video ==
The music video was directed by Brian Lazzaro and premiered in January 2012.

== Chart performance ==
Chart (2012)	Peak position
US Hot Country Songs (Billboard)	44
