= Real Good Time =

Studio album by Aaron Watson
- Released: October 9, 2012
- Genre: Country
- Label: Big Label
- Producer: Wes Hightower; Sam Seifert; Aaron Watson

Aaron Watson chronology
| The Road & the Rodeo (2010) | Real Good Time (2012) | The Underdog (2015) |

Real Good Time is the ninth studio album by American country music artist Aaron Watson. It was released on October 9, 2012.

== Content ==
The album includes a cover of Chris LeDoux's "Cadillac Cowboy", along with duets from Pat Green, Elizabeth Cook, Kevin Fowler, John Anderson, and others.

== Critical reception ==
Roughstock writer Matt Bjorke reviewed the album with favor, stating that "Watson is able to navigate the traditional country music waters and feel mainstream and evolutionary with each of his recordings. Real Good Time is the work of a man firmly in his element." Steve Leggett of Allmusic also gave the album a positive review, stating that it "shows once again why Aaron Watson is one of the best-kept secrets on the current contemporary country scene." Kelly Dearmore of Lone Star Magazine was more mixed, praising Watson's "slick yet sincere" style but criticizing the duets and inclusions of songs from previous albums.

== Track listing ==
From Aaron Watson's official website. All songs written by Aaron Watson except as noted.

1. "Real Good Time" - 2:23
2. "Summertime Girl" (Watson, Roger Springer, Tony Ramey, Jon Wolfe) - 3:44
3. "Lips" - 3:48
4. "Turn Around" (Trevor Morgan, Matt Maher, Michael Boggs) - 3:35
5. "July in Cheyenne (Song for Lane's Momma)" - 4:22
6. "Cadillac Cowboy" (Chuck Pyle) - 3:06
  - duet with Justin McBride
7. "Fish" - 2:23
8. "Leather and Lace" (Stevie Nicks) - 3:54
  - duet with Elizabeth Cook
9. "Raise Your Bottle" - 3:32
10. "Texas Boys" - 3:44
  - featuring Pat Green and Josh Abbott
11. "Nowhere Fast" - 3:02
12. "Deer Blind" - 2:41
  - featuring Kevin Fowler and John Anderson
13. "Hey Y'All" - 3:51
14. "Barbed Wire Halo" (Watson, Neal Lowry) - 4:25
15. "Reckless" (Watson, Lowry) - 3:42
16. "Off the Record" (Watson, Lowry) - 3:35
17. "I Don't Want You to Go" (Watson, Lowry) - 2:54
18. "Honky Tonk Kid" (Watson, Lowry) - 4:13
  - duet with Willie Nelson

== Chart positions ==
| Chart (2012) | Peak position |
|---|---|
| US Billboard 200 | 81 |
| US Top Country Albums (Billboard) | 9 |
| US Independent Albums (Billboard) | 19 |
