= High Country Sound =

Studio album by Canaan Smith
- Released: April 2, 2021
- Genre: Country; Neotraditional country
- Length: 37:16
- Label: Round Here; AWAL
- Producer: Canaan Smith; Corey Crowder; Tyler Hubbard; Brian Kelley

Canaan Smith chronology
Bronco (2015)	High Country Sound (2021)

Singles from High Country Sound
- 1. "Colder Than You" Released: June 8, 2020

High Country Sound is the second studio album by American country music artist Canaan Smith. The album was released on April 2, 2021 through Round Here Records and was the debut release of the indie label in association with AWAL. Smith co-wrote and produced every track on the album.

== Background ==
Smith released his debut album Bronco in 2015 on Mercury Nashville, who he split with after saying he felt "lost in the mix" of the major label environment. In 2019, he signed as the flagship artist to Round Here Records, an indie label founded by Tyler Hubbard and Brian Kelley of Florida Georgia Line, who Smith knew from his college days at Belmont University. He said the duo supported him and allowed him "100% freedom" when working on his new music, with no pressure to chase radio airplay. He remarked that he was "digging deep and reaching inside kind of thing to find that sound that best reflects me and not just a sound that we think is cool or is going to work or going to compete". Smith called the album "a flag in the ground for who I am and what I stand for".

== Track listing ==
High Country Sound
No.	Title	Writer(s)	Length
1.	"Grounded"	Canaan Smith; Ben Stennis; Jim Beavers	2:58
2.	"Mason Jars & Fireflies"	Smith; Brian Kelley; Corey Crowder	3:07
3.	"Colder Than You"	Smith; Crowder; Jared Mullins	3:21
4.	"High Country"	Smith; Crowder; Blake Redferrin	2:38
5.	"Catch Me If You Can" (featuring Brent Cobb)	Smith; Kelley; Tyler Hubbard; Jason Afable	2:49
6.	"Cabin in the Woods"	Smith; Kelley; David Garcia; Josh Miller	2:56
7.	"American Dream"	Smith; Blair Daly	3:18
8.	"Sweet Virginia"	Smith; Kelley; Crowder; Hubbard	3:06
9.	"Still"	Smith; Stennis; Beavers	3:10
10.	"Like I Ain't Missin' You"	Smith; Redferrin; Afable	3:05
11.	"Highway Blues"	Smith; Kelley; Jake Rose	3:16
12.	"Losin' Sleep Over a Girl"	Smith; Kyle Fishman; Marv Green	3:26
Total length:			37:16

== Release history ==
Release formats for High Country Sound
Country	Date	Format	Label	Ref.
Various	April 2, 2021	Digital download; streaming	Round Here Records; AWAL	
