= Canaan Smith (EP) =

EP by Canaan Smith
- Released: March 24, 2015
- Genre: Country
- Length: 15:34
- Label: Mercury Nashville
- Producer: Brett Beavers; Jimmy Robbins

Canaan Smith chronology
Canaan Smith (2015)	Bronco (2015)

Canaan Smith is the debut extended play (EP) by American country music singer Canaan Smith. It was released on March 24, 2015 via Mercury Nashville.

== Critical reception ==
Bill Caruthers of Country Standard Time gave the EP a mixed review. He praised the lyrics of "Hole in a Bottle" and "Stuck", comparing the former favorably to the work of David Lee Murphy. He was less favorable toward "Love You Like That", which he said "it doesn't really distinguish itself musically from any number of similar anthems." Caruthers also thought that Smith "runs the risk here of being lost in a carbon-copy crowd."

== Commercial performance ==
The album has sold 7,700 copies as of May 2015.

== Track listing ==
No.	Title	Writer(s)	Length
1.	"Love You Like That"	Canaan Smith; Brett Beavers; Jim Beavers	3:24
2.	"Two Lane Road"	B. Beavers; Marv Green; Smith	3:20
3.	"Mad Love"	B. Beavers; Aaron Goodvin; Smith	2:46
4.	"Hole in a Bottle"	Smith; B. Beavers; Dan Couch	2:37
5.	"Stuck"	Smith; B. Beavers; Vincent Hickerson	3:27
Total length:			15:34

== Chart performance ==
Chart (2015)	Peak position
US Billboard 200	97
US Top Country Albums (Billboard)	16
