= Hole in a Bottle =

Single by Canaan Smith

from the album Bronco
- Released: August 17, 2015
- Recorded: 2014
- Genre: Country
- Length: 2:37
- Label: Mercury Nashville
- Songwriters: Canaan Smith; Brett Beavers; Dan Couch
- Producers: Brett Beavers; Jimmy Robbins

Canaan Smith singles chronology
"Love You Like That" (2014)	"Hole in a Bottle" (2015)	"Like You That Way" (2017)

"Hole in a Bottle" is a song co-written and recorded by American country music singer Canaan Smith. Smith co-wrote the song with Brett Beavers and Dan Couch. It was released on August 17, 2015, as Smith's third single and the second single from a self-titled extended play released by Mercury Nashville on March 24, 2015. It was also included on Smith's debut album, Bronco, released on June 23, 2015.

== Content ==
The song uses various forms of "holes" to describe its narrator, who is drinking alcoholic beverages when heartbroken. An uncredited review in Taste of Country described the song as a "rowdy country-rocker that finds the singer wallowing in self-pity, much to his fans’ enjoyment." Smith told the same publication that he wrote the song with the intention of having a song which his fans could sing along to in concert.

== Critical reception ==
In a review of Smith's self-titled EP, Bill Caruthers of Country Standard Time criticized the song for its use of a drum machine instead of normal drums, but otherwise found the lyrical and vocal content favorably comparable to the work of David Lee Murphy.

== Chart performance ==
=== Weekly charts ===
Chart (2015–2016)	Peak position
Canada Country (Billboard)	50
US Country Airplay (Billboard)	23
US Hot Country Songs (Billboard)	30

=== Year-end charts ===
Chart (2016)	Position
US Hot Country Songs (Billboard)	92
