= Fight Like a Girl (Kalie Shorr song) =

"Fight Like A Girl"

Single by Kalie Shorr

from the album The Y2k Mixtape
- Released: January 15, 2016
- Recorded: 2015
- Genre: Country
- Length: 3:25
- Songwriter(s): Kalie Shorr; Hailey Steele; Lena Stone
- Producer(s): Jason Afable

"Fight Like a Girl" is a song co-written and recorded by American country artist Kalie Shorr for her debut mixtape, The Y2k Mixtape (2016). Shorr co-wrote the song with Hailey Steele and Lena Stone; the women met through Song Suffragettes, a writer's round and community in Nashville, Tennessee.

== Composition ==
"Fight Like a Girl" is a country song about female empowerment. The song was inspired by the events of #SaladGate in 2015, when a country radio consultant said that women didn't deserve a lot of airplay on country radio, because they were the tomatoes and garnish of the country music salad. Shorr and her two fellow Song Suffragettes, Hailey Steele and Lena Stone, wrote the track in response to those comments.

== Critical reception ==
"Fight Like A Girl" was discovered during a Song Suffragettes' performance in late 2015. An intern working at Sirius XM attended the show and then brought it up during a pitch meeting the next day. The song was added to The Highway (Sirius XM) as the "YouTube Country Spotlight." It was later chosen as a "Highway Find" and is now in regular rotation on The Highway.

"Fight Like A Girl" was also named the ninth best song of 2016 so far by Billy Dukes of Taste of Country. Dukes also said that the lyrics are "a punch to the solar plexus of any disparaging man, woman or other," and that it "is a song that needs to be heard now, tomorrow and in the months and years to come."

== Music videos ==
The unofficial music video was released on December 31, 2015. The video was made in dedication to the film Suffragette and contains footage from the movie.

The official music video premiered on CMT on March 29, 2016.
