= Outta Style =

Single by Aaron Watson

from the album Vaquero
- Released: November 14, 2016
- Genre: Country
- Length: 3:42
- Label: Big Label
- Songwriter: Aaron Watson
- Producers: Marshall Altman; Aaron Watson

Aaron Watson singles chronology
"Bluebonnets (Julia's Song)" (2016)	"Outta Style" (2016)	"Run Wild Horses" (2018)

"Outta Style" is a song written and recorded by American country music artist Aaron Watson. It was released on November 14, 2016, as the lead-off single from his album Vaquero. It became Watson's first Top 40 hit on the Billboard Hot Country Songs chart and also reached the Top 10 of the Country Airplay chart.

== Content ==
"Outta Style" is an uptempo country song with the hook "the way we love is never going out of style." Of the song, Watson said it was inspired by his wife Kimberly, and it is described as "an upbeat tribute to love and loyalty, [that] finds Watson tipping his hat to the country artists who came before him, too, with lines borrowed from Don McLean, Steve Earle, John Mellencamp and others."

== Chart performance ==
"Outta Style" debuted at number 60 on the Billboard Country Airplay chart the week dated January 21, 2017, and reached a peak of number 10 on the chart in December 2017.

=== Weekly charts ===
Chart (2017–2018)	Peak position
US Bubbling Under Hot 100 (Billboard)	5
US Country Airplay (Billboard)	10
US Hot Country Songs (Billboard)	24

=== Year-end charts ===
Chart (2017)	Position
US Hot Country Songs (Billboard)	84
Chart (2018)	Position
US Hot Country Songs (Billboard)	92
