= Vaquero (album) =

Studio album by Aaron Watson
- Released: February 24, 2017
- Genre: Country
- Label: Big Label
- Producer: Marshall Altman; Aaron Watson

Aaron Watson chronology
The Underdog (2015)	Vaquero (2017)	Live at the World's Biggest Rodeo Show (2018)

Singles from Vaquero
- 1. "Outta Style" Released: November 14, 2016; 2. "Run Wild Horses" Released: February 19, 2018

Vaquero is the eleventh studio album by American country music artist Aaron Watson. The album includes the singles "Outta Style", which reached the top 10 on the Billboard Country Airplay chart and "Run Wild Horses".

== Critical reception ==
Rating it 4 out of 5 stars, AllMusic critic Stephen Thomas Erlewine stated that "Vaquero navigates the territory between tradition and modernity, sounding strong and open, never making concessions to pop but never adhering to a calcified notion of country, either."

== Commercial performance ==
Vaquero debuted at No. 2 on Billboard's Top Country Albums, selling 37,000 copies (39,000 in album-equivalent units) in the first week, which is Watson's biggest sales week to date. The album has sold 68,800 copies in the United States as of March 2018.

== Track listing ==
All songs written by Aaron Watson, except as noted.

No.	Title	Writer(s)	Length
1.	"Texas Lullaby"		5:08
2.	"Take You Home Tonight"		3:04
3.	"These Old Boots Have Roots"		3:30
4.	"Be My Girl"		4:10
5.	"They Don't Make 'Em Like They Used To"		3:40
6.	"Vaquero"		3:46
7.	"Outta Style"		3:42
8.	"Run Wild Horses"		5:31
9.	"Mariano's Dream"		1:41
10.	"Clear Isabel"		4:24
11.	"Big Love in a Small Town"	Watson, Leslie Satcher	4:19
12.	"One Two Step at a Time"	Watson, Kendell Marvel	3:32
13.	"Amen Amigo"	Watson, Tim James, Mac McAnally	3:52
14.	"The Arrow"		3:45
15.	"Rolling Stone"	Watson, Altman, Heather Morgan	5:06
16.	"Diamonds and Daughters"		3:42

== Personnel ==
Adapted from AllMusic

- Marshall Altman - banjo, percussion, background vocals
- Glen Duncan - bouzouki, fiddle, mandolin
- Stuart Duncan - fiddle
- Tony Harrell - accordion, Hammond B-3 organ, Wurlitzer
- Jordan Lawson - fiddle
- Tony Lucido - bass guitar
- Pat McGrath - bouzouki, acoustic guitar
- Rob McNelley - electric guitar
- Heather Morgan - background vocals
- Russ Pahl - autoharp, steel guitar
- Jerry Roe - drums, percussion
- Aaron Watson - lead vocals

== Charts ==
=== Weekly charts ===
Chart (2017)	Peak position
US Billboard 200	10
US Top Country Albums (Billboard)	2

=== Year-end charts ===
Chart (2017)	Position
US Top Country Albums (Billboard)	72

=== Singles ===
Year	Single	Peak chart positions		
Year	Single	US Country	US Country Airplay	US Bub.
2017	"Outta Style"	24	10	5
2018	"Run Wild Horses"		33	
