= The Road & the Rodeo =

Studio album by Aaron Watson
- Released: October 12, 2010
- Genre: Country
- Label: Big Label

Aaron Watson chronology
Deep in the Heart of Texas: Aaron Watson Live (2009)	The Road & the Rodeo (2010)	Real Good Time (2012)

The Road & the Rodeo is the eighth studio album by American country music artist Aaron Watson, released in 2010 via Big Label. The album includes two non-charting singles, three cover songs, and original songs written by both Watson and other artists.

== Content ==
The album includes covers of Tom Petty's "Walls", Bruce Robison's "Drivin' All Night Long", and Larry Gatlin and the Gatlin Brothers' "Houston (Means I'm One Day Closer to You)". "The Road" and "Walls" were both issued as singles.

== Reception ==
Thom Jurek of Allmusic rated it 3 out of 5 stars, saying that "On one hand, Aaron Watson's The Road & the Rodeo stays close to his Texas country music, singer/songwriter roots; on the other, this is easily his slickest record to date and swinging for the fences in Nashville." Roughstock writer Matt Bjorke was more positive, stating that it "continues his expansion into the ‘mainstream’ but instead of being slick and glossy or ‘pop’ or faux rock like some of his contemporaries, Watson’s music still features as much steel guitar and fiddle as it does telecasters."

== Track listing ==
All songs written by Aaron Watson except as noted.

1. "Road & the Rodeo" (Watson, Mark Sissel) - 1:09
2. "The Road" (Elliot Park) - 3:21
3. "Walls" (Tom Petty) - 3:10
4. "Best for Last" - 3:44
5. "Fast Cars Slow Kisses" - 3:10
6. "Bless Her Crazy Heart" - 4:08
7. "Zero to Sixty" (Watson, Drew Womack) - 3:54
8. "Sweetheart of the Rodeo" - 2:29
9. "Conflict" (David Dunn) - 3:26
10. "Houston" (Larry Gatlin) - 2:57
11. "Hollywood" - 3:09
12. "High Price of Fame" - 3:30
13. "The Things You'll Do" - 3:16
14. "Drivin' All Night Long" (Bruce Robison) - 4:11
15. "After the Rodeo" (Troy Olsen, Don Rollins) - 4:15

== Chart positions ==
Chart (2010)	Peak position
US Billboard 200	150
US Top Country Albums (Billboard)	25
US Independent Albums (Billboard)	28
