= Till the Wheels Come Off =

Studio album by Cold Creek County
- Released: October 16, 2015
- Genre: Country
- Length: 35:00
- Label: Sony Music Canada
- Producer: Scott Cooke; Doug Oliver

Cold Creek County chronology
| Till the Wheels Come Off (2015) | Homemade (2017) |

Singles from Till the Wheels Come Off
- 1. "Our Town" Released: April 28, 2015; 2. "Till the Wheels Come Off" Released: August 28, 2015; 3. "Beer Weather" Released: March 7, 2016; 4. "Still That Way" Released: August 2016

Till the Wheels Come Off is the debut studio album by Canadian country music group Cold Creek County. It was released on October 16, 2015, via Sony Music Canada. It includes the singles "Our Town" and "Till the Wheels Come Off".

== Track listing ==
| No. | Title | Writer(s) | Length |
|---|---|---|---|
| 1. | "Ain't Had Enough of That Yet" | Lance Miller, Brad Warren, Brett Warren, Derek George | 3:23 |
| 2. | "Till the Wheels Come Off" | Todd Clark, Gavin Slate, Donovan Woods | 3:13 |
| 3. | "Beer Weather" | Jason Matthews, Joel Shewmake, Jim McCormick, Brinley Addington | 3:01 |
| 4. | "Drink You Up" | Tim James, Matthews, Miller | 3:19 |
| 5. | "Trucker Hat" | Matthews, Bridgette Tatum, Jayce Hein | 2:45 |
| 6. | "Our Town" | Clark, Slate | 3:16 |
| 7. | "Still That Way" | Clark, Will Pugh, Danny Orton | 3:31 |
| 8. | "Blow My Speakers" | Miller, Brad Warren, Brett Warren, George | 3:37 |
| 9. | "Good Thing We're in the Country" | Matthews, Jeff Stevens, Vicky McGehee | 2:47 |
| 10. | "I Can Change All That" | Jason Delkou, Sherrié Austin, Brandon Ray | 2:59 |
| 11. | "Ain't Nothing but a Party" | Matthews, Chris Janson, Wade Kirby | 3:09 |
| Total length: | | | 35:00 |

== Chart performance ==
=== Album ===
| Chart (2015) | Peak position |
|---|---|
| Canadian Albums (Billboard) | 36 |

=== Singles ===
| Year | Single | Peak chart positions | |
| Year | Single | CAN Country | CAN |
|---|---|---|---|
| 2015 | "Our Town" | 7 | 83 |
| 2015 | "Till the Wheels Come Off" | 15 | — |
| 2016 | "Beer Weather" | 18 | — |
| 2016 | "Still That Way"^{A} | 25 | — |
"—" denotes releases that did not chart
