= Gone Long Gone =

2015 song by Jason Benoit

Single by Jason Benoit

from the album Waves
- Released: February 24, 2015
- Genre: Country
- Length: 3:24
- Label: JV Records; Sony Canada
- Songwriter: Jason Benoit
- Producers: David Thomson; Gabriel Gallucci; Max River

Jason Benoit singles chronology
"Crazy Kinda Love" (2014)	"Gone Long Gone" (2015)	"Cold Day Comin'" (2015)

"Gone Long Gone" is a song written and recorded by Canadian country artist Jason Benoit. The track was produced by David Thomson, Gabriel Gallucci, and Max River. It was the second single off Benoit's debut studio album Waves.

== Background ==
Benoit was writing a post on Twitter when he realized he could turn the words he had written into the opening line of a song. He wrote the song by himself at home in Newfoundland. Benoit remarked that the process from writing the tweet to recording the full track took approximately eight months as both Sony Music Canada and his manager believed it would be a great follow-up to his previous single "Crazy Kinda Love".

== Commercial performance ==
"Gone Long Gone" reached a peak of number seven on the Billboard Canada Country chart for the week of July 18, 2015, marking Benoit's first career top ten hit. It also peaked at number 78 on the Canadian Hot 100 for the week of August 1, 2015, and was Benoit's first career entry on that chart. The song has been certified Gold by Music Canada.

== Charts ==
Chart performance for "Gone Long Gone"
Chart (2015)	Peak position
Canada (Canadian Hot 100)	78
Canada Country (Billboard)	7

== Certifications ==
Certifications for "Gone Long Gone"
Region	Certification	Certified units/sales
Canada (Music Canada)	Gold	40,000^{‡}
^{‡} Sales+streaming figures based on certification alone.
