= Smoke (A Thousand Horses song) =

Single by A Thousand Horses

from the album Southernality
- Released: January 19, 2015
- Genre: Country
- Length: 3:41
- Label: Republic Nashville
- Songwriters: Michael Hobby; Ross Copperman; Jon Nite
- Producer: Dave Cobb

A Thousand Horses singles chronology
"Smoke" (2015)	"(This Ain't No) Drunk Dial" (2015)

"Smoke" is a song recorded by American country music group A Thousand Horses. It is their debut single and the first from their album Southernality. The track is a country ballad about comparing one's love to tobacco and trying to let it go. The band's lead vocalist Michael Hobby co-wrote the song, along with Ross Copperman and Jon Nite.

"Smoke" reached number one on the Billboard Country Airplay chart, making A Thousand Horses the first country group to top that chart with their debut single since the Zac Brown Band's "Chicken Fried" in 2008. It also peaked at numbers 5 and 47 on both the Hot Country Songs and Hot 100 charts respectively. The song was certified Gold by the Recording Industry Association of America (RIAA), and has sold 474,000 copies in the United States as of July 2015. It achieved similar chart success in Canada, giving the band their first number-one hit on the Canada Country chart and number 53 on the Canadian Hot 100 chart. It received a Gold certification from Music Canada, denoting sales of 40,000 units in that country.

A music video by Peter Zavadil was made to promote the single and features the band performing the song live, as they're watching an exotic dancer perform on stage.

== Content ==
The song is a ballad in which the narrator compares his lover to the substance dependence of tobacco, referring to her as a "habit that I can't let go".

== Reception ==
=== Critical ===
Giving it a "B+", Jim Casey of Country Weekly praised the song's Southern rock and blues influences, adding that "The forlorn lyrics are despairing, but frontman Michael Hobby's gritty vocals…drive the song into an endorphin-releasing euphoria."

=== Commercial ===
The song debuted at number 48 on the Country Airplay chart dated for the week ending January 24, 2015. It debuted at number 48 on the Billboard Hot Country Songs chart dated for the week ending January 24, 2015. It debuted at number 9 on the Billboard Bubbling Under Hot 100 Singles chart dated for the week ending February 14, 2015, and then entered the Hot 100 at number 90 on chart dated March 14, 2015. "Smoke" reached number one on the Country Airplay chart dated June 13, 2015, making A Thousand Horses the first country group to send a debut single to number one since the Zac Brown Band's "Chicken Fried" in December 2008. As of July 2015, the song had sold 474,000 downloads in the US.

The song debuted at number 42 on the Billboard Canada Country chart for the week of March 14, 2015. It also debuted at number 92 on the Canadian Hot 100 chart for the week of April 18, 2015.

== Music video ==
The music video was directed by Peter Zavadil. In the video, the band performs the song live about an erotic dancer they are watching on stage. Joseph Hudak of Rolling Stone compared the video to that of "Girls, Girls, Girls" by Mötley Crüe.

== Chart performance ==
Chart (2015)	Peak position
Canada Hot 100 (Billboard)	53
Canada Country (Billboard)	1
US Billboard Hot 100	47
US Country Airplay (Billboard)	1
US Hot Country Songs (Billboard)	5

=== Year-end charts ===
Chart (2015)	Position
US Country Airplay (Billboard)	23
US Hot Country Songs (Billboard)	20

== Certifications ==
Region	Certification	Certified units/sales
Canada (Music Canada)	Gold	40,000^{‡}
United States (RIAA)	Gold	474,000
^{‡} Sales+streaming figures based on certification alone.
