= (This Ain't No) Drunk Dial =

Single by A Thousand Horses

from the album Southernality
- Released: June 29, 2015
- Genre: Country
- Length: 3:30
- Label: Republic Nashville
- Songwriter(s): Michael Hobby; Corey Crowder; Neil Mason; Cale Dodds
- Producer(s): Dave Cobb

A Thousand Horses singles chronology
"Smoke" (2015)	"(This Ain't No) Drunk Dial" (2015)	"Southernality" (2016)

"(This Ain't No) Drunk Dial" is a song recorded by American country music group A Thousand Horses. It is the second single from their album Southernality. The band's lead vocalist Michael Hobby co-wrote the song, along with Corey Crowder, Neil Mason and Cale Dodds.

== Critical reception ==
An uncredited Taste of Country review stated that ""(This Ain't No) Drunk Dial" is a strong follow-up to a chart-topper that took little time in standing out from the clutter on the radio. It's similar enough to add another brick to the group's Dixie-rock-country brand, but the story separates it from what they previously released."

== Music video ==
The music video was directed by Peter Zavadil and premiered in June 2015. It features the band performing the song in a courthouse hallway, and them testifying in front of a judges panel.

== Chart performance ==
Chart (2015)	Peak position
Canada Country (Billboard)	50
US Country Airplay (Billboard)	23
US Hot Country Songs (Billboard)	30

=== Year-end charts ===
Chart (2015)	Position
US Country Airplay (Billboard)	93
