= Canaan Smith =

American singer and songwriter (born 1982)

- Born: Canaan Lee Smith; August 24, 1982 (age 43); Dillsboro, Indiana, U.S.
- Origin: Nashville, Tennessee, U.S.
- Genres: Country
- Occupations: Singer; songwriter
- Instruments: Vocals; guitar
- Years active: 2009–present
- Labels: Round Here; AWAL; Mercury Nashville
- Spouse: Christy Hardesty (m. 2014)
- Website: canaansmith.com

Canaan Lee Smith (born August 24, 1982) is an American country music singer and songwriter signed with Round Here Records, an independent label started by Florida Georgia Line. He has released two albums, Bronco in 2015 and High Country Sound in 2021. His second single, "Love You Like That", was a number one hit on the Billboard Country Airplay chart. He was also a reality television contestant on the 15th season of The Amazing Race.

== Career ==
=== 2009-2017: Mercury Nashville and Bronco ===
In 2009, Smith moved to Nashville in search of a musical career and co-wrote the hit "Runaway" by country band Love and Theft which made it to number 10 in the Billboard Hot Country Songs and 65 on the Billboard Hot 100 in 2009.

His debut single, "We Got Us", was released in January 2012 after being made available on iTunes starting December 24, 2011. The song was written by Stephen Barker Liles, Tommy Lee James, and Smith; it was produced by Brett Beavers and Luke Wooten and it debuted at number 53 on the country music charts. The music video, directed by Brian Lazarro, was broadcast on GAC and was on the "GAC Top 20 Ballot". Country Weekly magazine named him as an artist to notice in "Ones to Watch in 2012", as did Roughstock.com.

Smith returned to the studio in February 2012 to finish his debut album. On July 21, 2014, he released his second single, titled "Love You Like That". The music video was released on Vevo on September 10, 2014. In October 2014, he was featured as one of the "10 New Artists You Need To Know: Fall 2014" in Rolling Stone Country. On March 24, 2015, he released a self-titled EP. The EP debuted at No. 16 on the Top Country Albums chart and at No. 97 on the Billboard 200, with 2,900 copies sold in the US for the week. On June 23, he released his first full-length studio album, titled Bronco. "Love You Like That" reached number one on the Country Airplay chart in July 2015, and number 46 on the Billboard Hot 100. The second single from the album, "Hole in a Bottle," was released in August. In September, Smith announced his first headlining concert tour, the Stompin' Grounds Tour, with support from Russell Dickerson. In 2016, Smith appeared in the season four finale of Bar Rescue performing during the grand re-opening of The Gallopin' Goose.

=== 2018-present: Round Here Records and Tree Vibez Music ===
In March 2018, Smith parted ways with the label Mercury Nashville. In May 2018, he signed as a songwriter with publishing company Tree Vibez Music which was founded by Tyler Hubbard and Brian Kelley of Florida Georgia Line. In February 2019, it was announced that Smith would join Florida Georgia Line on their Can’t Say I Ain’t Country Tour on select dates alongside Dan + Shay, Morgan Wallen, and HARDY. In August 2019, Smith signed with Round Here Records as their flagship artist, and released a new track titled “Beer Drinking Weather”. The label began operations on the same day and is run by Hubbard and Kelley who also co-wrote the new track.

In June 2020, Smith released his first single to country radio in three years, "Colder Than You". His second studio album, High Country Sound, was released on April 2, 2021.

== Personal life ==
Smith graduated from Lafayette High School in Williamsburg, Virginia and attended Belmont University in Nashville. He and his then-girlfriend, Mika Combs, were the seventh team eliminated in the 15th season of The Amazing Race.

In March 2014, Smith became engaged to his girlfriend Christy Hardesty and they married in August 2014. On October 31, 2019, they welcomed their daughter Virginia Rose Smith.

== Discography ==
=== Studio albums ===
Title	Album details	Peak chart positions		Sales
Title	Album details	US Country	US	Sales
Bronco	Release date: June 23, 2015; Label: Mercury Nashville	4	29	US: 38,700
High Country Sound	Release date: April 2, 2021; Label: Round Here Records / AWAL	—	—	

=== Extended plays ===
Title	Album details	Peak chart positions		Sales
Title	Album details	US Country	US	Sales
Canaan Smith	Release date: March 24, 2015; Label: Mercury Nashville	16	97	US: 7,700

=== Singles ===
Year	Single	Peak chart positions					Certifications	Sales	Album
Year	Single	US Country Songs	US Country Airplay	US	CAN Country	CAN	Certifications	Sales	Album
2012	"We Got Us"	44		—	—	—			Non-album single
2014	"Love You Like That"	2	1	46	15	84	RIAA: Platinum	US: 690,000	Bronco
2015	"Hole in a Bottle"	30	23	—	45	—		US: 47,000	Bronco
2017	"Like You That Way"	—	50	—	—	—			Non-album singles
2017	"This Night Back"	—	—	—	—	—			Non-album singles
2020	"Colder Than You"	—	—	—	—	—			High Country Sound
"—" denotes releases that did not chart

=== Music videos ===
Year	Video	Director
2012	"We Got Us"	—N/a
2014	"Love You Like That"	Marc Klasfeld
2015	"Hole in a Bottle"	Chris Hicky
2019	"Beer Drinkin’ Weather"	Thomas Heney / Adam Romaine
2019	"Country Boy Things"	—N/a
2020	"Colder Than You"	Kurt Ozan
