= Kalie Shorr =

American singer-songwriter (born 1994)

- Born: Kalianne Frances Shorr; July 11, 1994 (age 31); Portland, Maine
- Genres: Country, rock, pop rock
- Occupation: Singer-songwriter
- Instrument(s): Vocals, guitar, piano, mandolin
- Years active: 2009–present
- Labels: tmwrk

Kalie Shorr (born July 11, 1994) is an American rock and country music singer-songwriter based in Nashville, Tennessee. In 2016, her debut single "Fight Like a Girl" began to receive national attention and airplay on the SiriusXM radio station The Highway. She released her debut album, Open Book on September 27, 2019.

== Career ==
Shorr grew up in Portland, Maine. She wrote her first song at age 6, and picked up the guitar for the first time at age 13. Shorr began posting covers of popular songs on YouTube when she was 13. She was also in a couple of bands, including a Nirvana Cover-band, back in middle and high school. She visited Nashville for the first time when she was 16, and when she was 19, moved to Nashville to pursue a career in country music. In 2010, she was the Southern Maine winner of Maine's Got Talent. Celebrity Blogger and now friend, Perez Hilton took notice of Shorr's covers and original songs on YouTube, and invited her to perform at his birthday party in March 2012, opening for the Backstreet Boys.

In March 2014, Shorr became involved in a weekly live show, Song Suffragettes, featuring only female singer-songwriters. Shorr has continued performing in the show almost every week since then, and was the first artist highlighted by Taste of Country for their Let The Girls Play campaign. Her YouTube covers continue to be successful, as did her cover of Taylor Swift's "Blank Space," highlighted by Popdust." In February 2015, she released an EP full of demos she had recorded over her time in Nashville, named The Nashville Sessions.

In 2016, her single "Fight Like a Girl" began to receive airplay on Sirius XM The Highway, and she released her debut mixtape, The Y2K Mixtape, heavily inspired by the 2000s. In May, she signed a publishing deal with the publishing company Writerslist.

Shorr released her second single, titled "He's Just Not That into You" on September 30, 2016. Shorr released a five-song EP, Slingshot, in March 2017 and told Sounds Like Nashville that the project combined pop and country sounds to reflect, "huge part of my sound and how I identify myself."

Shorr released her debut album Open Book on September 27, 2019. The album was named the seventh best album of 2019 by The New York Times. She signed with New York-based tmwrk records in October, 2020. A reissue of her debut record Open Book, titled Open Book: Unabridged was released on December 4, 2020 under her new label.

In 2021, she released her EP I Got Here By Accident, produced by Butch Walker. This project marked a sonic departure for Shorr, and her first release outside of the Country genre. In support of the release, they performed together at the Grand Ole Opry in Nashville, Tennessee, which was Walker’s debut on the iconic stage.

After a several year hiatus, Shorr started a multi-part series on social media detailing the reasons behind her absence called “How I Got Unfamous”. The series went viral, amassing several million views across all platforms. This led to a resurgence of popularity and ultimately, an end to her unofficial hiatus.

On January 30, 2025, she released “Unkiss”, her first solo single in over a year. Shorr released her EP My Type on July 11, 2025.

== Personal life ==
Shorr has identified as queer.

On January 5, 2019, she announced on Instagram that her older sister, Ashley Rhiannon Coffman, had died from an accidental drug overdose. On publicly sharing her sister’s cause of death, she told Taste of Country: “I wanna tell my story … but I also wanna be respectful of other people. But my dad had that same approach with that to us sharing how my sister passed away, because I wrote the obituary too. Be honest about it.” As a result of her sister’s passing, she has done numerous interviews and television appearances advocating for harm reduction access and legalization. In 2024, she was nominated for a Webby Award in “Best Individual Podcast Episode - News & Politics” for her episode of In The Room with Peter Bergen covering the opioid epidemic.

On March 30, 2020, Shorr announced via Twitter, that she had recently been diagnosed with COVID-19.

In 2021, she confirmed to People Magazine that she was in a relationship with fellow musician, Sam Varga. The couple reportedly began dating in 2020.

== Discography ==
=== Albums ===
Title	Details
Open Book	Release date: September 27, 2019; Label: Unsigned
Open Book: Unabridged	Release date: December 4, 2020; Label: tmwrk

=== Extended plays ===
Title	Details
The Nashville Sessions	Release date: 2015; Label: Unsigned
The Y2k Mixtape	Release date: March 13, 2016; Label: Unsigned
Slingshot	Release date: March 11, 2017; Label: Unsigned
Awake	Release date: January 26, 2018; Label: Unsigned
I Got Here By Accident	Release date: 2021; Label: tmwrk

=== Singles ===
Year	Single	Album
2012	"Cloud 9"	—
2016	"Fight Like a Girl"	The Y2k Mixtape
2016	"He's Just Not That Into You"	Slingshot – EP
2017	"Nothin New"	Slingshot – EP
2018	"Two Hands"	Awake – EP
2018	"Candy"	Awake – EP
2019	"Lullaby"	Open Book
2019	"F U Forever"	Open Book
2020	"My Voice"	Open Book: Unabridged
2020	"Lying To Myself"	Open Book: Unabridged

=== Other appearances ===
Title	Year	Artist	Album
"Reazon 2 Rhyme"	2016	Ben Shorr	Live & Direct
"I Didn’t Die"	2024	Candi Carpenter	

=== Music videos ===
Year	Video
2016	"Fight Like a Girl"
2016	"He's Just Not That Into You"
2018	"Two Hands"
2019	"Awake (Country Mix)"
2019	"Awake (Pop Mix) ft. Jonny Brenns"
2019	"Lullaby"
2020	"Escape"
2020	"My Voice"
