= The Underdog (Aaron Watson album) =

Studio album by Aaron Watson
- Released: February 17, 2015
- Genre: Texas country
- Length: 53:26
- Label: Big Label
- Producer: Keith Stegall

Aaron Watson chronology
Real Good Time (2012)	The Underdog (2015)	Vaquero (2017)

Singles from The Underdog
- 1. "That Look" Released: October 14, 2014; 2. "Freight Train" Released: April 2015; 3. "Getaway Truck" Released: September 28, 2015; 4. "Bluebonnets (Julia's Song)" Released: April 18, 2016

The Underdog is a 2015 studio album by Texas country music artist Aaron Watson. It was released on February 17, 2015 via Big Label Records. It debuted at number one on the Billboard Top Country Albums chart, selling 26,340 copies in its first week of release. The album has sold 82,900 copies in the US as of March 2017.

== Track listing ==
All tracks are written by Aaron Watson except where noted.

No.	Title	Writer(s)	Length
1.	"The Prayer"		3:07
2.	"Wildfire"	John Mayer	3:21
3.	"Freight Train"	Watson, Tim Nichols, Troy Olsen	2:55
4.	"That Look"		4:29
5.	"Getaway Truck"		3:39
6.	"Bluebonnets (Julia's Song)"		4:16
7.	"That's Why God Loves Cowboys"	Watson, Olsen, Sarah Buxton	3:53
8.	"That's Gonna Leave a Mark"		3:12
9.	"The Underdog"		4:31
10.	"Blame It on Those Baby Blues"	Watson, Hunter Hutchinson	3:24
11.	"One of Your Nights"		4:03
12.	"Family Tree"	Watson, Keith Stegall	3:53
13.	"Rodeo Queen"	Watson, John Caldwell, Jim Beavers	3:22
14.	"Fence Post"		5:21
Total length:			53:26

== Personnel ==
- Eddie Bayers - drums
- Milo Deering - fiddle
- Dan Dugmore - steel guitar
- Stuart Duncan - fiddle
- Larry Franklin - fiddle
- Paul Franklin - steel guitar
- Wes Hightower - background vocals
- Brent Mason - electric guitar
- Billy Panda - acoustic guitar
- Gary Prim - Hammond B-3 organ, piano
- John Wesley Ryles - background vocals
- Jimmie Lee Sloas - bass guitar
- Bobby Terry - acoustic guitar
- Bruce Watkins - banjo
- Aaron Watson - acoustic guitar, lead vocals
- John Willis - banjo

== Chart performance ==
=== Weekly charts ===
Chart (2015)	Peak position
US Billboard 200	14
US Top Country Albums (Billboard)	1
US Independent Albums (Billboard)	1

=== Year-end charts ===
Chart (2015)	Position
US Top Country Albums (Billboard)	52

=== Singles ===
Year	Single	Peak chart positions	
Year	Single	US Country	US Country Airplay
2014	"That Look"	41	47
2015	"Getaway Truck"	—	—
2016	"Bluebonnets (Julia's Song)"	—	60
"—" denotes releases that did not chart
