= Cold Creek County =

Canadian country rock group

- Origin: Brighton, Ontario, Canada
- Genres: Country rock
- Years active: 2014–2019
- Labels: Sony Music Canada
- Members: Brandon Scott
- Past members: Brandon Scott (lead singer); Ches Anthony (lead singer); Doug Oliver; Josh Lester (guitar/vocals); Justin Lester(bass/vocals)

Cold Creek County is a Canadian country rock group based in Brighton, Ontario. Its members are Doug Oliver, Josh Lester, Trevor MacLeod, Justin Lester, and Jordan Honsinger. They were founded in 2013 and signed to Sony Music Canada in 2014.

== History ==
They toured with Dallas Smith, Emerson Drive, Kira Isabella and Jason Blaine. They released their debut single, "Our Town", in April 2015. It was the most added debut single by a Canadian country artist. It has reached the top 10 on the Billboard Canada Country chart. It was written by Todd Clark and Gavin Slate.

The band performed in 2016 at the Tweed Stampede and Jamboree. That year the band was presented with a Canadian Radio Music Award.

In June 2019, Cold Creek Country performed at the Country Music Association of Ontario awards gala. On September 24, 2019, Josh Lester and his brother Justin left the band.

== Discography ==
=== Albums ===
Title	Details	Peak chart positions
Title	Details	CAN
Till the Wheels Come Off	Release date: October 16, 2015; Label: Sony Music Canada	36

=== Extended plays ===
Title	Details	Peak chart positions
Title	Details	CAN
Homemade	Release date: June 2, 2017; Label: Sony Music Canada	—

=== Singles ===
Year	Single	Peak chart positions		Album
Year	Single	CAN Country	CAN	Album
2015	"Our Town"	7	83	Till the Wheels Come Off
2015	"Till the Wheels Come Off"	15	—	Till the Wheels Come Off
2016	"Beer Weather"	18	—	Till the Wheels Come Off
2016	"Still That Way"	25	—	Till the Wheels Come Off
2017	"Homemade"	11	—	Homemade
2018	"This Town Is You"	38	—	Homemade
"—" denotes releases that did not chart

=== Music videos ===
Year	Video	Director	Ref.
2015	"Our Town"	Harv Glazer	
2015	"Till the Wheels Come Off"	Emma Higgins	
2017	"Homemade"	Emma Higgins	

== Awards and nominations ==
Year	Awards	Category	Nominee/Work	Result	Ref
2016	CCMA Awards	Rising Star Award	Cold Creek County	Nominated	
2016	CCMA Awards	Group or Duo of the Year	Cold Creek County	Nominated	
2016	CCMA Awards	Video of the Year	"Our Town"	Nominated	
2016	Canadian Radio Music Awards	Best New Group or Solo Artist: Country	"Our Town"	Won	
2017	CMAO Awards	Group or Duo of the Year	Cold Creek County	Won	
2017	CMAO Awards	Fan's Choice	Cold Creek County	Nominated	
2017	CMAO Awards	Single of the Year	"Beer Weather"	Nominated	
2017	CMAO Awards	Album of the Year	Till The Wheels Come Off	Nominated	
2017	CCMA Awards	Group or Duo of the Year	Cold Creek County	Nominated	
2018	CMAO Awards	Album of the Year	Homemade	Nominated	
2018	CMAO Awards	Group/Duo of the Year	Cold Creek County	Won	
2018	CMAO Awards	Music Video of the Year	Homemade	Nominated	
2018	CMAO Awards	Record Producer(s) of the Year	Scott Cooke & Doug Oliver - Cold Creek County "Homemade"	Nominated	
