= The Lumberjack (Hal Willis song) =

Single by Hal Willis
- Released: 1964
- Genre: Country
- Label: Quality
- Songwriter(s): Hal Willis, Ginger Willis

Hal Willis singles chronology
"The Lumberjack" (1964)	"Nopper the Topper" (1965)

"The Lumberjack" is a single by Canadian country music artist Hal Willis. The song peaked at number 1 on the RPM Country Tracks chart. It also reached number 5 on the Billboard Hot Country Singles chart in the United States.

== Chart performance ==
Chart (1964)	Peak position
Canadian RPM Country Tracks	1
U.S. Billboard Hot Country Singles	5
U.S. Billboard Bubbling Under Hot 100	20
