= Bronco (Canaan Smith album) =

Studio album by Canaan Smith
- Released: June 23, 2015
- Genre: Country
- Length: 34:40
- Label: Mercury Nashville
- Producer: Brett Beavers; Jimmy Robbins; Ryan Tyndell

Canaan Smith chronology
Canaan Smith (2015)	Bronco (2015)	High Country Sound (2021)

Singles from Bronco
- 1. "Love You Like That" Released: July 21, 2014; 2. "Hole in a Bottle" Released: August 17, 2015

Bronco is the debut studio album by American country music singer Canaan Smith. It was released on June 23, 2015 via Mercury Nashville. The album includes all five songs from his self-titled extended play, including the number one single "Love You Like That". The title track is a tribute to Smith's older brother, Nathaniel, who died in a car crash.

== Commercial performance ==
The album debuted at No. 4 on the Top Country Albums chart, and at No. 29 on the US Billboard 200, selling 12,000 copies for week. The album has sold 38,700 copies as of March 2016.

== Track listing ==
No.	Title	Writer(s)	Length
1.	"Good Kinda Bad"	Canaan Smith; Brett Beavers; Casey Beathard	3:40
2.	"Stompin' Grounds"	Jaren Johnston; Lindsay Rimes	3:02
3.	"Love You Like That"	Smith; B. Beavers; Jim Beavers	3:23
4.	"Hole in a Bottle"	Smith; B. Beavers; Dan Couch	2:37
5.	"Stuck"	Smith; B. Beavers; Vincent Hickerson	3:27
6.	"One of Those"	Ash Bowers; Jason Mizelle; JP Williams	3:11
7.	"Mad Love"	Smith; B. Beavers; Aaron Goodvin	2:46
8.	"Love at First"	Andrew Dorff; Johnston; Jimmy Robbins	2:54
9.	"American Muscle"	Smith; B. Beavers; Couch; Ryan Tyndell	2:30
10.	"Two Lane Road"	Smith; B. Beavers; Marv Green	3:20
11.	"Bronco"	Smith; Scooter Carusoe	3:56
Total length:			34:48

Target deluxe edition
No.	Title	Writer(s)	Length
12.	"Getting Into"	Smith; B. Beavers; J. Beavers	3:31
13.	"Fire"	Smith; Kevin Kadish	3:04
Total length:			41:23

== Personnel ==
- Brett Beavers – banjo, bass guitar, acoustic guitar, baritone guitar, electric guitar, handclapping, keyboards, mandolin, programming, sounds, stomping, synthesizer
- Duffy Brown – electric guitar
- Dan Couch – background vocals
- Kenny Fuller – electric guitar
- Mike Johnson – pedal steel guitar
- Darren Rayl – drums
- Jimmy Robbins – banjo, acoustic guitar, electric guitar, keyboards, mandolin, percussion, programming
- Canaan Smith – 12-string acoustic guitar, acoustic guitar, electric guitar, handclapping, keyboards, percussion, programming, sounds, synthesizer, lead vocals, background vocals
- Ryan Tyndell – electric guitar, handclapping, percussion, programming, sounds, synthesizer, background vocals

== Chart performance ==
=== Weekly charts ===
Chart (2015)	Peak position
US Billboard 200	29
US Top Country Albums (Billboard)	4

=== Year-end charts ===
Chart (2015)	Position
US Top Country Albums (Billboard)	71

=== Singles ===
Year	Single	Peak chart positions				
Year	Single	US Country	US Country Airplay	US	CAN Country	CAN
2014	"Love You Like That"	6	1	46	20	84
2015	"Hole in a Bottle"	30	23	—	50	—
