= Hal Willis (singer) =

Canadian country singer-songwriter (1933–2015)

- Born: Léonald Francis Gauthier; July 15, 1933; Rouyn-Noranda, Quebec, Canada
- Died: September 4, 2015 (aged 82); Nashville, Tennessee, U.S.
- Spouse: Ginger Willis
- Musical career
- Genres: Country, rockabilly
- Occupation: Singer-songwriter
- Instruments: Guitar
- Years active: 1950s–2015
- Labels: Sims Records; Decca Records; Atlantic Records; Mercury Records; Arc international Records; Bonanza Records

Hal Willis (born Léonald Francis Gauthier; July 15, 1933 – September 4, 2015) was a Canadian country singer who lived in Nashville, Tennessee, USA. He was born in Rouyn-Noranda, Quebec the youngest son of Alfred and Evelina Gauthier.

== Career ==
His famous country single was "The Lumberjack," an international hit that sold over 1.5 million copies. In 1965, it peaked at number 5 on the Billboard country charts in the USA. This success was such a phenomenon that he was nicknamed "Mr. Lumberjack."

His popularity started rising in 1956 when he and his wife, Ginger Willis, were hired by Colonel Tom Parker to tour with the music phenomenon of the hour, Elvis Presley. At this time, Hal and Ginger were also rock and roll singers recording songs like "My Pink Cadillac" and "Bop a Dee Bop a Doo." Hal and Ginger, along with Hank Snow, were the only Canadian performers to tour with Elvis Presley. He also performed and toured through his career with many American Country Music Hall of Fame singers such as Patsy Cline, Webb Pierce, Loretta Lynn, Dolly Parton, Porter Wagoner, Johnny Cash and Willie Nelson.

Hal and Ginger Willis were inducted into the Canadian Country Music Hall of Fame in 2010.

On May 27, 2012, Hal Willis was also inducted to the Quebec Museum of Rock & Roll through a ceremony held in Rouyn-Noranda, Quebec, Canada at the international Festival des guitares du monde de l'Abitibi-Témiscamingue.

In March 2013, at the age of 79 years, Hal Willis released a new single "Working in the Goldmine".

== Death ==
Willis died in Nashville, Tennessee on September 4, 2015.

== Discography ==
=== Studio albums ===
Year	Album	Label
1966	Mr. Lumberjack	Arc
1967	Mr. Lumberjack: Volume 2	Arc
1972	Hal Willis	Bonanza
1999	Santa's Clones	Pearl
2000	Coast to Coast	Pearl
2006	A Cut Above	Pearl
2006	Better 'N Ever	Pearl

=== Singles ===
Year	Title	Chart Positions		
Year	Title	CAN Country	US Country	US
1964	"The Lumberjack"	1	5	120
1965	"Nopper the Topper"	7	—	—
1965	"Klondike Mike"	1	—	—
1966	"Doggin' in the US Mail"	—	45	—
