= Jason Benoit =

Singer-songwriter

- Born: Stephenville, Newfoundland, Canada
- Genres: Country
- Occupation: Singer-songwriter
- Years active: 2013–present
- Labels: BMV Records; Jayward Artist Group; Viktory; JV; Sony Canada

Jason Benoit is a country music singer-songwriter from Fox Island River, in western Newfoundland. Benoit began pursuing his professional music career in 2013. His first single was a country rendition of the Armin van Buuren and Trevor Guthrie dance song "This Is What It Feels Like", which peaked on the Billboard Canada Country chart at number 46. The single was included on the country music compilation album, Country Heat 2014. In 2014, Benoit signed his first label deal with the newly formed JV Records/Sony Music Canada and shortly after released "Crazy Kinda Love". On March 9, 2015, Benoit released his third single, "Gone Long Gone". The latter reached the top ten on the Canadian Billboard Country chart in the summer of 2015 and was certified Gold by Music Canada shortly thereafter.

== Biography ==
In July 2015, Benoit received the inaugural CCMA Discovery Atlantic Award from the Canadian Country Music Association. The same year, Benoit was nominated for CCMA Rising Star and follow-up single "Cold Day Comin" reached number 21 on the Canadian Country Billboard Charts. Benoit had another top 30 in the year 2016 with "All Wanna Party" reaching number 26 on the Canadian Country Billboard Chart.

In 2017, Benoit released the album "Waves", his final release with JV Records/Sony. This album went on to be nominated for "Country Album of the Year" at the 2017 ECMA Awards. In 2018, Benoit was a finalist in SiriusXM "Top of the Country" in association with the CCMAs and he was the only independent Canadian Country Artist invited to walk the red carpet at the 2018 Much Music Video Awards in Toronto, ON. He signed a new record deal with independent record label, Vicktory Music Group. Benoit also recorded critically acclaimed single "Slow Hand"; the song also feels Canadian female country singer Leah Daniels. Benoit went on to record a seven track EP titled "Revolution Part 1". It was released in 2019 and included "Slow Hand" as well as all new songs. In 2019, Benoit was direct tour support for the CMA Award winning country act "Old Dominion" along with "the Washboard Union" on the eastern leg of the "Make it Sweet" tour and later that year toured with "the Washboard Union" on the Ontario leg of their tour. In 2020, Benoit won his first East Coast Music Award for "Fans Choice Video of the Year". He also began writing his next album with long time friend and PEI native, Gerry Foote. Due to the COVID-19 pandemic, he began doing his bi-weekly "Friday Night Lock Down" live streams which achieved much fan support.

In 2021, Benoit won his first MusicNL award for "Indigenous Artist of the Year". That same year, Benoit produced his first full body of work, the "Time Traveller" albums. Benoit released his first Christmas song "How Great Thou Art" with Manitoba country singer Kendra Kay. In the fall of 2021, Benoit began working with Toronto based Management team, Johnson Talent Management. In 2022, Benoit released his first EP "Time Traveller - Side A" with the help of co-producer, fellow Newfoundlander, Clint Curtis of Sevenview Studios and distributed the album through Jayward Artist Group/the Orchard. The album was cited as some of Benoit's greatest work by SiriusXM "Canada Talks" personality Allison Dore. Dore stated that "...it feels like this album is a step up from anything else he's released in the past." In April, 2022, Benoit was Spotify Canada's "Indigenous Artist of the Month" having his image displayed on the Eaton's Centre Spotify billboard on Young and Dundas, in Toronto, Ontario. In May of 2022, Benoit was featured on the nationally televised Global TV program "ET Canada" for the first time. Benoit has performed at country music festivals such as Boots and Hearts Music Fest, and Cavendish Beach Music Festival. He was the only Canadian Country Artist to Perform at the 2017 Rock the Park Music Fest in London, Ontario, alongside Lady A, Kelsea Ballerini, and Brett Young. Benoit's album Time Traveller received a nomination for "Alternative Country Album of the Year" at the 2023 Canadian Country Music Awards.

== Discography ==
=== Studio albums ===
Title	Details
Waves	Release date: 2017; Label: JV (Sony)
Revolution Part 1	Release date: 2019; Label: (Vicktory Music Group/Fontana North)
Time Traveller - Side A	Release date: 2022; Label: BMV Records (Jayward Artist Group/The Orchard)

=== Singles ===
Year	Single	Peak chart positions		Certifications	Album
Year	Single	CAN Country	CAN	Certifications	Album
2013	"This Is What It Feels Like"	46	—		Country Heat 2014
2014	"Crazy Kinda Love"	29	—		Waves
2015	"Gone Long Gone"	7	78	MC: Gold	Waves
2015	"Cold Day Comin'"	21	—		Waves
2016	"Waves"	56	—		Waves
2016	"All Wanna Party"	23	—		Waves
2017	"The Moonshine"	73	—		Waves
2018	"Slow Hand Ft. Leah Daniels'"	61	—		Revolution Part 1
2018	"Forget to Forget"	77	—		Revolution Part 1
2019	"I Won't Go"	77	—		Revolution Part 1
2020	"Two Wrongs"	Digital Exclusive	—		Revolution Part 1
2021	"A Lot about a Little"	81	—		Single
2022	"Devil in a Bottle"	91	—		Time Traveller - Side A
2022	"Shootin' Me Down"	47	—		Time Traveller - Side A
2023	"VHS"	—	—		TBA
"—" denotes releases that did not chart

=== Music videos ===
Year	Video	Director
2015	"Cold Day Comin'"	Jae Yu
2018	"Slow Hand"	Tim Deegan
2021	"A Lot about a Little"	John Hynes
2022	"Devil in a Bottle"	Tim Deegan

== Awards and nominations ==
Year	Association	Category	Result
2015	Canadian Country Music Association	Discovery Atlantic Award	Won
2015	Canadian Country Music Association	Rising Star	Nominated
2017	East Coast Music Association	Country Album of the Year	Nominated
2020	East Coast Music Association	Fans Choice Video of the year "Slow Hand ft. Leah Daniels"	Won
2021	MusicNL Award	Indigenous Artist of the Year	Won
2022	MusicNL Award	Indigenous Artist of the Year	Nominated
2022	MusicNL Award	Ron Hynes Songwriter of the year	Nominated
2022	MusicNL Award	Country Artist of the Year	Nominated
2022	MusicNL Award	Fans Choice Entertainer	Nominated
2022	MusicNL Award	Solo Artist of the Year	Nominated
2023	Canadian Country Music Association	Alternative Country Artist of the Year - Time Traveller	Nominated
