= Love You Like That =

Single by Canaan Smith

from the album Bronco
- Released: July 21, 2014
- Recorded: 2014
- Genre: Country
- Length: 3:23
- Label: Mercury Nashville
- Songwriters: Canaan Smith; Brett Beavers; Jim Beavers
- Producers: Brett Beavers; Jimmy Robbins

Canaan Smith singles chronology
"We Got Us" (2012)	"Love You Like That" (2014)	"Hole in a Bottle" (2015)

"Love You Like That" is a song co-written and recorded by American country music singer Canaan Smith. Smith co-wrote the song with Brett Beavers and Jim Beavers. It was released on July 21, 2014, as Smith's second single and the lead single from a self-titled extended play released by Mercury Nashville on March 24, 2015. It was also included on Smith's debut album, Bronco, released on June 23, 2015.

The song received positive reviews from critics praising Smith's vocal delivery and his co-written imagery with the Beavers. "Love You Like That" reached number one on the Billboard Country Airplay chart, giving Smith his first number-one country hit in his career. It also peaked at numbers 6 and 46 on both the Hot Country Songs and Hot 100 charts respectively. It was certified Platinum by the Recording Industry Association of America (RIAA), and has sold 690,000 copies as of August 2015. The song also charted in Canada, reaching number 20 on the Canada Country chart and number 84 on the Canadian Hot 100 chart.

A music video directed by Marc Klasfeld was made to promote the single.

== Critical reception ==
Markos Papadatos of Digital Journal gave "Love You Like That" four and a half stars out of five, writing that "the song has a Brantley Gilbert vibe to it and his vocals are as smooth as silk. It is raw and authentic. He stays true to himself and his own artistry." The song also received a favorable review from Taste of Country, which said that "the trio’s lyrics are colorful, familiar and lasting. The metaphors they use throughout the chorus are sharp and effective, and Smith wraps his arms around this love story like he’s saying goodbye at the airport."

== Commercial performance ==
"Love You Like That" debuted at number 59 on the U.S. Billboard Country Airplay chart for the week of August 9, 2014. It also debuted at number 32 on the U.S. Billboard Hot Country Songs chart for the week of August 9, 2014. The song reached number one on the Country Airplay chart for the chart dated July 25, 2015, and became Smith's first number one hit on the chart. It also charted on the Hot 100 chart at number 46 the same week, having peaked at number 6 on the Hot Country Songs chart the week before.

The song was certified Gold by the RIAA on June 15, 2015. The song has sold 690,000 copies in the US as of August 2015.

== Music video ==
The music video was directed by Marc Klasfeld and premiered in September 2014.

== Charts and certifications ==
=== Weekly charts ===
Chart (2014–2015)	Peak position
Canada Hot 100 (Billboard)	84
Canada Country (Billboard)	20
US Billboard Hot 100	46
US Country Airplay (Billboard)	1
US Hot Country Songs (Billboard)	6

=== Year-end charts ===
Chart (2015)	Position
US Country Airplay (Billboard)	13
US Hot Country Songs (Billboard)	17

=== Certifications ===
Region	Certification	Certified units/sales
United States (RIAA)	Platinum	690,000
