= Southernality =

Studio album by A Thousand Horses
- Released: June 9, 2015
- Genre: Southern rock; country rock
- Label: Republic Nashville
- Producer: Dave Cobb

A Thousand Horses chronology
A Thousand Horses (2010)	Southernality (2015)

Singles from Southernality
- 1. "Smoke" Released: January 19, 2015; 2. "(This Ain't No) Drunk Dial" Released: June 29, 2015; 3. "Southernality" Released: February 29, 2016

Professional ratings
Review scores
Source	Rating
AllMusic	3.5/5 stars

Southernality is the debut studio album by American rock band A Thousand Horses. It was released on June 9, 2015, via Republic Nashville. The album includes their debut single "Smoke", which reached number 1 on Country Airplay.

== Critical reception ==
Giving it 3.5 out of 5 stars, Thom Jurek of Allmusic wrote that "This band has been carefully molded for chart success without sacrificing its identity -- or revealing it fully, either. This album, as thoroughly enjoyable as it is, tells only part of the story. A Thousand Horses need to be witnessed live to be fully appreciated. It will be interesting to see what direction they take in the future and if that aspect of their persona is revealed on their records. For now, Southernality delivers on the band's modern country promise and warrants repeated listening."

== Track listing ==
No.	Title	Writer(s)	Length
1.	"First Time"	Michael Hobby, Bill Satcher, Patrick Davis	4:38
2.	"Heaven Is Close"	Hobby, Satcher, Graham DeLoach	3:56
3.	"Smoke"	Hobby, Ross Copperman, Jon Nite	3:40
4.	"Travelin' Man"	Hobby, Satcher, Jaren Johnston	3:58
5.	"Tennessee Whiskey"	Hobby, Satcher	3:23
6.	"Sunday Morning"	Hobby, Satcher, DeLoach, Zach Brown, Rich Robinson	3:34
7.	"Southernality"	Hobby, Corey Crowder, Neil Mason	2:27
8.	"(This Ain't No) Drunk Dial"	Hobby, Crowder, Mason, Cale Dodds	3:30
9.	"Landslide"	Hobby, Satcher, Brown	3:21
10.	"Back to Me"	Hobby, Satcher, DeLoach, Westin Davis	3:26
11.	"Trailer Trashed"	DeLoach	2:45
12.	"Hell on My Heart"	Hobby, Satcher, DeLoach, Brown	3:41
13.	"Where I'm Going"	Hobby, Brad Warren, Brett Warren	3:29

== Personnel ==
A Thousand Horses

- Zach Brown - electric guitar, background vocals
- Graham DeLoach - bass guitar, background vocals
- Michael Hobby - acoustic guitar, harmonica, lead vocals
- Bill Satcher - acoustic guitar, electric guitar, background vocals

Additional Musicians

- Dave Cobb - acoustic guitar, electric guitar
- Whitney Coleman - background vocals
- Chris Powell - drums
- Brian Purwin - keyboards, mellotron, violin
- Kristen Rogers - background vocals
- Robby Turner - steel guitar
- Michael Webb - keyboards

== Chart performance ==
The album debuted on the Top Country Album at No. 3, selling 17,000 copies in the US. The album has sold 50,200 copies in the US as of September 2015.

=== Weekly charts ===
Chart (2015)	Peak position
US Billboard 200	20
US Top Country Albums (Billboard)	3

=== Year-end charts ===
Chart (2015)	Position
US Top Country Albums (Billboard)	50

=== Singles ===
Year	Single	Peak chart positions				
Year	Single	US Country	US Country Airplay	US	CAN Country	CAN
2015	"Smoke"	5	1	47	1	53
2015	"(This Ain't No) Drunk Dial"	30	23	—	50	—
2016	"Southernality"	—	57	—	—	—
"—" denotes releases that did not chart
