= Our Town (Cold Creek County song) =

Single by Cold Creek County

from the album Till the Wheels Come Off
- Released: April 28, 2015
- Genre: Country rock
- Length: 3:16
- Label: Sony Music Canada
- Songwriter(s): Todd Clark; Gavin Slate
- Producer(s): Scott Cooke

Cold Creek County singles chronology
| "Our Town" (2015) | "Till the Wheels Come Off" (2015) |

"Our Town" is the debut single by Canadian country music band Cold Creek County. It was written by Todd Clark and Gavin Slate. It was released in April 2015 via Sony Music Canada.

== Commercial performance ==
The song debuted at No. 42 on the Billboard Canada Country charts on May 23, 2015. It was the most added song to Canadian country radio. It reached the Top Ten in June 2015.

== Music video ==
The official music video for "Our Town" premiered on June 12, 2015.

== Charts ==
| Chart (2015) | Peak position |
|---|---|
| Canada Canadian Hot 100 | 83 |
| Canada Country (Billboard) | 7 |
