= Aaron Watson =

American singer (born 1977)

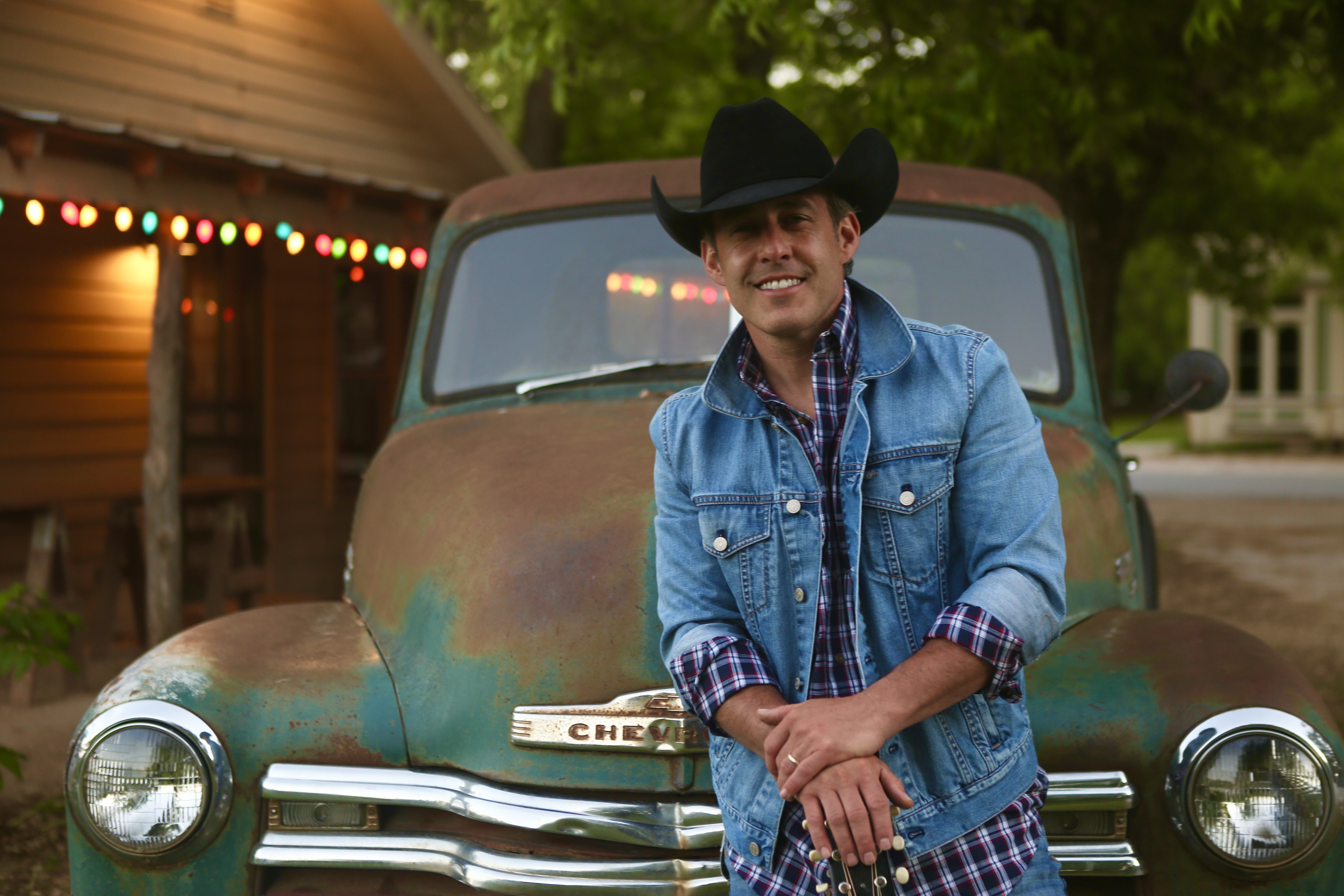
- Watson in 2020.

Background information
- Born: James Aaron Watson; August 20, 1977 (age 49); Amarillo, Texas, U.S.
- Genres: Country; Texas country
- Occupations: Musician, songwriter
- Instruments: Vocals, Guitar
- Years active: 1999-present
- Spouse: Kimberly Watson
- Website: www.aaronwatson.com

James Aaron Watson (born August 20, 1977) is an American country music singer and songwriter. Active since 1999, Watson has recorded several independent albums in his career. His 2015 album The Underdog reached No. 1 on Top Country Albums that year, and in 2017, Watson had his first major radio airplay hit with "Outta Style", which reached top 10 on Country Airplay.

== Biography ==
Watson was born in Amarillo, Texas, and graduated from Randall High School. He then attended Lubbock Christian University and Abilene Christian University, where he began learning guitar, after playing junior college baseball in New Mexico. Watson's earliest musical influences were the classic country records by George Jones, Merle Haggard, and Willie Nelson his parents listened to, and the gospel hymns he sang with his family in church.

== Musical career ==
He released his first album, Aaron Watson – Singers and Songwriters in 1999 and followed that up with Texas Cafe in 2000. It was not until this third album, Shut Up And Dance, in 2002, that Watson gained radio airplay and attention nationwide. Following that record's success, he released The Honky Tonk Kid, produced by Ray Benson and featuring Willie Nelson on guest vocals.

He worked various gigs around Texas before releasing his second album, A Texas Cafe. The follow-up, Shut Up And Dance, was a regional sales success. His 2004 album, The Honky Tonk Kid, was produced by Ray Benson and features an appearance by Willie Nelson. Watson's band is called the Orphans of the Brazos; they appear on his 2005 album, Live at the Texas Hall of Fame. In 2006, his San Angelo release hit No. 60 on the US Billboard country charts and No. 50 on its Heatseekers chart.

On March 20, 2007, Watson released his seventh studio album, a collection of gospel songs entitled Barbed Wire Halo, which includes readings by Billy Joe Shaver. On April 1, 2008, Watson's eighth album, Angels & Outlaws, reached No. 4 on the US Billboard Heatseekers chart, No. 28 on its Country Albums chart, and landed in the Billboard 200. The album's debut single, "Hearts Are Breaking Across Texas", reached the No. 1 spot on the Texas Music Chart. "Love Makin' Song" was released later that year, and "Rollercoaster Ride" followed in 2009.

On September 15, 2009, Watson released Aaron Watson LIVE: Deep in the Heart of Texas, a dual disc CD/DVD set recorded live at the Hog Creek Ice House in Waco, Texas on June 27, 2009.

On July 7, 2009, Watson performed at the 81st Texas FFA Convention in Dallas, Texas.

Watson's 10th studio album, The Road & The Rodeo, was released in October 2010. This was his first record released under the independent record label, Big Label Records. The album peaked at No. 25 on the US Billboard Country Albums chart and reached No. 4 on the US Billboard Heatseeksers chart.

October 9, 2012, Aaron Watson released Real Good Time. It achieved national attention, and was the best performing album for Watson to date, peaking at No. 9 on the US Billboard Country Albums. It was also his first to break into the top twenty for independent albums. It had sold 32,000 copies as of February 2015.

In 2014, Aaron Watson released "That Look," which served as the lead-off single from his album The Underdog, which was released on February 17, 2015. The single debuted in the top 10 of the Billboard Country Digital Songs chart and went on to become one of the most successful-selling independent singles by the end of December 2014. The Underdog made him the first independent male artist to debut at Number One on the Billboard Top Country Albums chart with a self-released and independently distributed and promoted album. The record sold more than 26,000 units in the first week.

Watson's eleventh studio album Vaquero was released on February 24, 2017. Its lead single, "Outta Style," was his first top 10 hit on the Billboard Country Airplay chart. That single went on to win a BMI Awards for most radio airplay in 2017 and a BMI Millionaire Award. "Run Wild Horses" was released as the album's second single and was a minor top 40 hit on the Country Airplay chart.

In 2018, he released his first live record in ten years Live at the World's Biggest Rodeo Show on August 24, 2018 followed later that year by his first Christmas project, An Aaron Watson Family Christmas, which was released on October 5, 2018, and featured his wife and kids.

In 2019, Watson made a further play for national commercial success. On June 21, 2019, he independently released “Red Bandana”, a 20-song album which received mixed reviews from his fans. Its lead-off single, "Kiss That Girl Goodbye," was released on February 4, 2019. "Country Radio" followed as the second single in September 2019.

== Discography ==
=== Albums ===
Title	Album details	Peak chart positions				Sales
Title	Album details	US Country	US	US Heat	US Indie	Sales
Singer/Songwriter	Release date: 1999; Label: Sonnet	—	—	—	—	
A Texas Café	Release date: 2001; Label: Sonnet	—	—	—	—	
shutupanddance	Release date: July 23, 2002; Label: Sonnet	—	—	—	—	
The Honky Tonk Kid	Release date: March 30, 2004; Label: Big Label Records	—	—	—	—	
Live at the Texas Hall of Fame	Release date: April 5, 2005; Label: Sonnet	—	—	—	—	
San Angelo	Release date: April 4, 2006; Label: Sonnet	60	—	50	43	
Barbed Wire Halo	Release date: March 20, 2007; Label: Sonnet	—	—	—	—	
Angels & Outlaws	Release date: April 1, 2008; Label: Big Label	28	175	4	25	
Deep in the Heart of Texas: Aaron Watson Live	Release date: September 15, 2009; Label: Big Label	47	—	24	—	
The Road & the Rodeo	Release date: October 12, 2010; Label: Big Label	25	150	4	28	
Real Good Time	Release date: October 9, 2012; Label: Big Label	9	81	—	19	US: 32,000
The Underdog	Release date: February 17, 2015; Label: Big Label	1	14	—	1	US: 82,900
Vaquero	Release date: February 24, 2017; Label: Big Label	2	10	—	—	US: 68,800
Live at the World's Biggest Rodeo Show	Release date: August 24, 2018; Label: Big Label	—	—	—	16	US: 2,000
An Aaron Watson Family Christmas	Release date: October 5, 2018; Label: Big Label	—	—	—	—	US: 1,800
Red Bandana	Release date: June 21, 2019; Label: Big Label	7	53	—	1	US: 14,100
American Soul	Release date: January 8, 2021; Label: Big Label	—	—	—	—	
Unwanted Man	Release date: June 17, 2022; Label: Adub Records	—	—	—	—	
Cover Girl	Release date: August 27, 2023; Label: Adub Records	—	—	—	—	
Horse Named Texas	Release date: March 6, 2026; Label: Adub Records	—	—	—	—	
"—" denotes releases that did not chart

=== Singles ===
Year	Single	Peak chart positions				Album
Year	Single	US Country	US Country Airplay	US Bub.	CAN Country	Album
2008	"Love Makin' Song"	—	—	—	—	Angels & Outlaws
2009	"Rollercoaster Ride"	—	—	—	—	Angels & Outlaws
2009	"The Road"	—	—	—	—	The Road & the Rodeo
2010	"Walls"	—	—	—	—	The Road & the Rodeo
2012	"Raise Your Bottle"	—	—	—	—	Real Good Time
2013	"Summertime Girl"	—	—	—	—	Real Good Time
2013	"July in Cheyenne (Song for Lane's Momma)"	—	—	—	—	Real Good Time
2014	"That Look"	41	47	—	—	The Underdog
2015	"Getaway Truck"	—	—	—	—	The Underdog
2016	"Bluebonnets (Julia's Song)"	—	60	—	—	The Underdog
2016	"Outta Style"	24	10	5	20	Vaquero
2018	"Run Wild Horses"	—	33	—	—	Vaquero
2019	"Kiss That Girl Goodbye"	—	52	—	—	Red Bandana
2019	"Country Radio"	—	—	—	—	Red Bandana
2020	"Whisper My Name"	—	—	—	—	American Soul
2021	"Boots"	—	—	—	—	American Soul
2022	"The Old Man Said"	—	—	—	—	Unwanted Man
2023	"Seven Year Ache" (with Jenna Paulette)	—	—	—	—	Cover Girl
2023	"9 to 5" (with Kylie Frey)	—	—	—	—	Cover Girl
2025	"Pontiac (So Tell Me Momma)"	—	60	—	—	Horse Named Texas
"—" denotes releases that did not chart

=== Music videos ===
Year	Video	Director
2012	"Raise Your Bottle"	Zack Morris/Benjamin Ranzinger
2013	"Lips"	Paul De La Cerda
2014	"July in Cheyenne"	Timothy Allen/Benjamin Ranzinger
2017	"Outta Style"	
2018	"Run Wild Horses"	
2018	"Lonely Lonestar Christmas"	
2019	"Old Friend"	
2019	"Riding With Red"	
2019	"Trying Like The Devil"	
