= A Thousand Horses =

American rock band

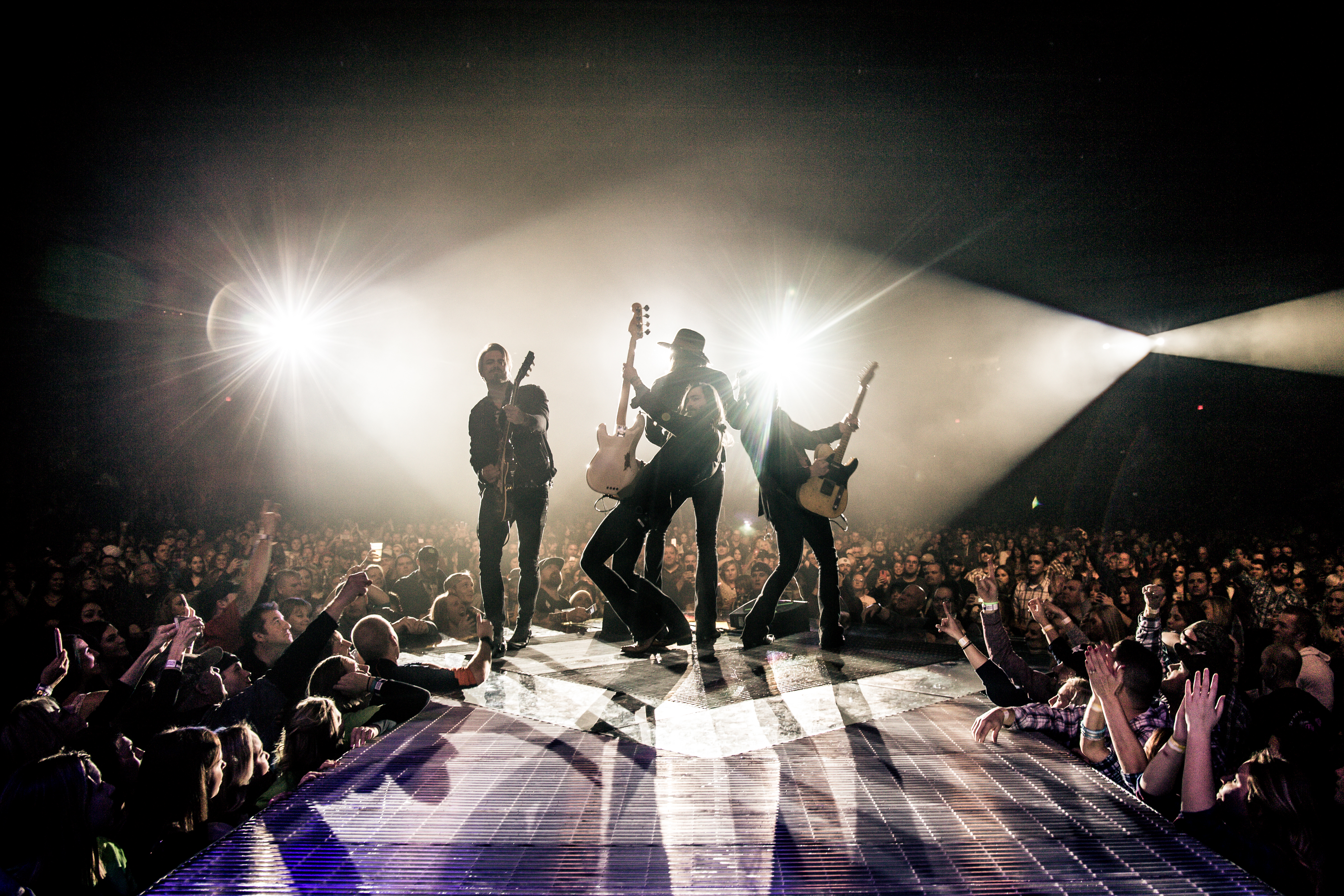
- A Thousand Horses performing in Bloomington, IL on January 16, 2015. Photo credit: Chance Edwards A Thousand Horses in 2016

Background information
- Origin: Nashville, Tennessee
- Genres: Southern rock; country rock
- Years active: 2010–present
- Labels: Nashville Harbor, Highway Sound
- Members: Michael Hobby; Graham DeLoach; Bill Satcher
- Past members: Zach Brown

A Thousand Horses is an American country rock band formed in 2010 in Nashville, Tennessee. The band is composed of Michael Hobby (lead vocals), Bill Satcher (lead guitar), and Graham Deloach (bass and vocals); Zach Brown (guitar, vocals) was also a member until leaving in 2023. Their first EP, A Thousand Horses, was released under Interscope Records in 2010. In 2014, the band signed with Republic Nashville of Big Machine Label Group and released its first single "Smoke", which set a record for the highest debut by a new act when it opened at number 28 on the Country Aircheck radio chart.

== Biography ==
Michael Hobby and Bill Satcher grew up in Newberry, South Carolina, where they began writing songs at the age of 15. Satcher's cousin and Savannah, Georgia, native Graham DeLoach joined the duo soon after. A friend eventually introduced Atlanta native Zach Brown, and A Thousand Horses was formed. The name "A Thousand Horses" came from a song on their first EP. They enjoy writing their own original songs, but they occasionally collaborate with other writers around Nashville. They have toured nationwide and released their full-length album Southernality on January 21, 2015.

=== Bridges ===
Their "deluxe EP", Bridges, was released on June 2, 2017, with Nashville Harbor Records & Entertainment. Producing the new CD with Dann Huff and Corey Crowder, the band vowed to keep their unique sound intact. One of the featured songs on the record is a live version of their breakthrough hit "Smoke" recorded in Printer's Alley.

=== Southernality ===
Released June 9, 2015, Southernality is A Thousand Horses' debut album, released by Republic Nashville. The first single, "Smoke", has charted on Country Airplay and Hot Country Songs, reaching number one on the former chart, making A Thousand Horses the first country group to chart a number-one debut single since the Zac Brown Band's "Chicken Fried" reached number one in December 2008. Reviews have been generally positive commending their smooth vocals, lyrics, and blend of country and rock. The album's second single, "(This Ain't No) Drunk Dial", was released to country radio on June 29, 2015. The album's third single, the title track, was released to country radio on February 29, 2016.

=== A Thousand Horses ===
"A high-energy hybrid of classic rock and bluesy country with enough soul flavor to resurrect the sound of American greats..."

— Rolling Stone, 2014, Rolling Stone website.

Their debut E.P., A Thousand Horses, was released on August 17, 2010, under Republic Nashville. It was recorded in six days in Silver Lake, California, with producer Dave Cobb.

The song "Suicide Eyes" from the E.P. was featured in the movie Footloose starring Kenny Wormald and Julianne Hough. The director, Craig Brewer, found the song and knew that it fit the vibe for the movie.

For their performance at the Austin City Limits festival in 2014, Rolling Stone hailed the band as the best up-and-comer, praising their "undeniable energy and stage presence [and] their live performance".

Zach Brown quit the band in 2023 to spend more time with family. A year later, the other three members released a new album titled The Outside on Highway Sound Records.

In 2026, A Thousand Horses were primarily focused on promoting their album White Flag Down and touring extensively in support of it.

=== Influences ===
A Thousand Horses self-identifies as a hybrid of classic rock, country, American rock, soul, and blues. Their sound mimics Lynyrd Skynyrd, the Allman Brothers, the Black Crowes, and the Rolling Stones in the context of modern country. Hobby's songwriting is rooted in such songwriters as Dwight Yoakam and Tom Petty.

== Discography ==
=== Studio albums ===
Title	Album details	Peak chart positions		Sales
Title	Album details	US Country	US	Sales
Southernality	Release date: June 9, 2015; Label: Republic Nashville; Format: CD, music download	3	20	US: 50,200
Bridges	Release date: June 2, 2017; Label: BLMG Records; Format: Music download	—	—	US: 800
Broken Heartland	Release date: August 26, 2022; Label: Highway Sound Records	—	—	
The Outside	Release date: 2024; Label: Highway Sound Records	—	—	
White Flag Down	Release date: February 27, 2026; Label: Highway Sound Records			
"—" denotes releases that did not chart

=== Extended plays ===
Title	Album details
A Thousand Horses	Release date: August 17, 2010; Label: DGC/Interscope Records; Format: Music download

=== Singles ===
Year	Single	Peak chart positions					Certifications	Sales	Album
Year	Single	US Country	US Country Airplay	US	CAN Country	CAN	Certifications	Sales	Album
2015	"Smoke"	5	1	47	1	53	US: Platinum; CAN: Gold	US: 474,000	Southernality
2015	"(This Ain't No) Drunk Dial"	30	23	—	50	—			Southernality
2016	"Southernality"	—	57	—	—	—			Southernality
2017	"Preachin' to the Choir"	—	55	—	—	—			Bridges
2020	"A Song to Remember"	—	53	—	—	—			TBD
"—" denotes releases that did not chart

=== Music videos ===
Year	Video	Director
2015	"Smoke"	Peter Zavadil
2015	"(This Ain't No) Drunk Dial"	Peter Zavadil
2015	"The First Time"	
2016	"Southernality"	Shaun Silva
