= Amos (album) =

Studio album by Michael Ray
- Released: June 1, 2018
- Genre: Country
- Label: Atlantic Nashville
- Producer: Scott Hendricks

Michael Ray chronology
Michael Ray (2015)	Amos (2018)

Singles from Amos
- 1. "Get to You" Released: July 24, 2017; 2. "One That Got Away" Released: July 2, 2018; 3. "Her World or Mine" Released: May 13, 2019

Amos is the second studio album by American country music singer Michael Ray. It was released via Atlantic Nashville on June 1, 2018. Its lead single, "Get to You", has charted in the top 20 on the Billboard Country Airplay chart. Ray named the album after his late grandfather, who was the inspiration for most of the tracks on the album.

== Commercial performance ==
The album debuted on Billboard's Top Country Albums at number 5, with 6,700 copies sold. It sold an additional 1,600 copies in the second week. It has sold 16,600 copies in the United States as of April 2019.

== Track listing ==
No.	Title	Writer(s)	Length
1.	"Fan Girl"	Matt Jenkins; Josh Osborne; Brad Tursi	3:30
2.	"One That Got Away"	Jesse Frasure; Osborne; Matthew Ramsey; Trevor Rosen	3:38
3.	"Summer Water"	Lee Thomas Miller; Heather Morgan	3:07
4.	"Get to You"	Pavel Dovgalyuk; Abe Stoklasa	3:12
5.	"Forget About It"	Jaren Johnston; Luke Laird	2:46
6.	"Her World or Mine"	Brett Beavers; Travis Denning; Jamie Paulin	3:28
7.	"You're On"	Jessi Alexander; Jenkins; Chase McGill	3:05
8.	"I'm Gonna Miss You"	Corey Crowder; Matt McGinn	2:44
9.	"Dancing Forever"	Ross Copperman; Shane McAnally; Ramsey; Rosen	3:34
10.	"Girl from Spring Break"	Rhett Akins; Ben Hayslip; Emily Weisband	3:21
11.	"Drink One for Me"	Jon Nite; Jimmy Robbins; Josh Thompson	3:26

== Personnel ==
- Perry Coleman - background vocals
- Paul DiGiovanni - electric guitar, programming, synthesizer
- David Dorn - keyboards, piano, synthesizer
- Tony Lucido - bass guitar
- Rob McNelley - electric guitar
- Miles McPherson - drums, percussion
- Gordon Mote - organ, piano, Wurlitzer
- Russ Pahl - pedal steel guitar
- Danny Rader - banjo, bouzouki, acoustic guitar, hi-string guitar
- Michael Ray - lead vocals
- Jordan Schmidt - programming, synthesizer, background vocals
- Adam Shoenfeld - electric guitar
- Derek Wells - electric guitar
- Nir Z. - drums, percussion, programming

== Charts ==
Chart (2018)	Peak position
US Billboard 200	53
US Top Country Albums (Billboard)	5
