= Abby Anderson discography =

- EPs: 1 (Note: It does not included the non-major-label work released)
- Singles: 10

American country singer-songwriter, Abby Anderson released her five-song debut, I'm Good, through Black River Entertainment in 2018.

== Extended plays ==
List of musical works, with selected chart positions
Title	Details	Peak chart positions	Sales
Title	Details	Country Album Sales	Sales
He Loves Me	Released: June 2014; Label: Self-released; Format: Digital download	—	
I'm Good	Released: September 7, 2018; Label: Black River; Format: CD, digital download	42	
Be That Girl	Released: March 25, 2022; Label: Fat Cheeks; Format: CD, digital download	—	
First to Hit the Road	Released: September 15, 2023; Label: 615 Music; Format: CD, digital download	—	

== Singles ==
=== As lead artist ===
List of singles, with selected chart positions and certifications, showing year released and album name
Title	Year	Peak chart positions				Certifications	Sales	Album
Title	Year	Country Airplay	Country Digital Songs	Hot Christian Songs	Christian Digital Song Sales	Certifications	Sales	Album
"Let Freedom Ring"	2014	—	—	9	2			non-album single
"This Feeling"	2017	—	—	—	—			I'm Good
"Make Him Wait"	2018	59	—	—	—			I'm Good
"House of the Rising Sun"	2018	—	—	—	—			non-album single
"Shallow" (ft.Jimmie Allen)	2019	—	21	—	—		US: 3,000	non-album single
"Good Lord"	2019	—	—	—	—			non-album single
"Guy Like You"	2019	—	—	—	—			non-album single
"Flowers"	2019	—	—	—	—			non-album single
"I'll Still Love You"	2020	—	—	—	—			non-album single
"Heart On Fire In Mexico"	2023	—	—	—	—			First to Hit the Road

=== As featured artist ===
List of singles, with selected chart positions and certifications, showing year released and album name
Title	Year	Peak chart positions				Certifications	Sales	Album
Title	Year	Country Airplay	Country Digital Songs	Hot Christian Songs	Christian Digital Song Sales	Certifications	Sales	Album
"Willing To Let You Go"; Diplo featuring Anella Herim and Abby Anderson	2024	—	—	—	—			non-album single

== Other appearance ==
Year	Title	Note
2019	"Fearless"	Soundtrack for A Dog's Journey
