= Whiskey and Rain =

2020 single by Michael Ray

Single by Michael Ray

from the EP Higher Education
- Released: October 26, 2020
- Genre: Country
- Length: 3:26
- Label: Warner Bros. Nashville
- Songwriters: Jesse Frasure; Josh Thompson
- Producer: Ross Copperman

Michael Ray singles chronology
"Her World or Mine" (2019)	"Whiskey and Rain" (2020)	"Holy Water" (2022)

Music video
- "Whiskey and Rain" on YouTube

"Whiskey and Rain" is a song recorded by American country music singer Michael Ray. It was released on October 26, 2020, and served as the lead single to his EP, Higher Education. The song reached number one on the Country Airplay chart dated January 22, 2022, giving Ray his second number one single on the chart. The song was co-written by Jesse Frasure and Josh Thompson, and produced by Ross Copperman.

== Content ==
"Whiskey and Rain" describes someone drowning their sorrows in a glass of something strong, and Ray pointed out the song's vibe draws to mind some of his country forebears.

He told website Everything Nash: “I guess I always knew that I wanted more of a traditional country sound. That’s what I grew up on, what I listen to, to this day. And I just always felt like that was the record I wanted to make. It took this year, I guess, to really realize that on my own. So this song, it was just that catchy, hooky melody, that throwback to the Gary Allan. It sounds like Gary Allan, Dwight Yoakam — all of that. It just stood out. And really, we felt was a great way to introduce this new record and new sound.”

== Composition ==
"Whiskey and Rain" is a song with a '90s country vibe. Frasure tweaked the demo with a sibilant, '80s-pop drum sound and light, flute-tinted piano chords.

== Music video ==
The music video was released on October 29, 2020, directed by Sean Hagwell, who brings the song’s throwback style to life. The video revealed Ray riding out the storm.

Ray told to CMT about the message from this video: “We wanted the video to show that going through rough spots in life can open you up to different people and their situations. Maybe you can listen to their stories for a while. I think the video reflects the depth of the song, and it shows how sometimes the negative things in life can bring people together.”

== Chart performance ==
"Whiskey and Rain" reached number one on the Billboard Country Airplay chart dated January 22, 2022, becoming Ray's second number one on that chart, and his first since his debut single, "Kiss You in the Morning", in August 2015. Having taken 65 weeks to reach number one, it tied a record previously set in June 2020 by Travis Denning's "After a Few" for the slowest ascent to the top. Both songs would later be surpassed by Justin Moore's "Time's Ticking" in April 2026. It also became Ray's first top 40 single on the Billboard Hot 100, peaking at number 37.

== Charts ==
=== Weekly charts ===
Weekly chart performance for "Whiskey and Rain"
Chart (2020–2022)	Peak position
US Billboard Hot 100	37
US Country Airplay (Billboard)	1
US Hot Country Songs (Billboard)	6

=== Year-end charts ===
2021 year-end chart performance for "Whiskey and Rain"
Chart (2021)	Position
US Country Airplay (Billboard)	55
US Hot Country Songs (Billboard)	60

2022 year-end chart performance for "Whiskey and Rain"
Chart (2022)	Position
US Country Airplay (Billboard)	46
US Hot Country Songs (Billboard)	59
US Radio Songs (Billboard)	70

== Certifications ==
Region	Certification	Certified units/sales
United States (RIAA)	Platinum	1,000,000^{‡}
^{‡} Sales+streaming figures based on certification alone.
