= Jon Nite =

American songwriter (born 1988)

- Born: March 19, 1980 (age 45)
- Origin: Amarillo, Texas, U.S.
- Genres: Country; rock
- Occupations: Songwriter; artist
- Years active: 2006–present
- Labels: Sony/ATV Music Publishing

Jon Nite (born March 19, 1988) is an American singer/songwriter. He is Grammy-nominated, and has won CMA and ACM awards. He has written over 30 Billboard Airplay hits including 18 No.1's with billions of streams in multiple genres.

Nite's songs have been recorded by Tim McGraw, Dierks Bentley, Keith Urban, Gabby Barrett, Charlie Puth, Brandi Carlile, Luke Bryan, Kenny Chesney, Jake Owen, Dan and Shay, Michael Ray, Brett Young, Darius Rucker, Dustin Lynch, and more. In 2019 "Break Up in the End" by Cole Swindell lead Nite to receive a Grammy Nomination for Best Country Song, an ACM Nomination for Country Song of the Year, and an NSAI award for Song of the Year. Some of Nite's recent No.1s include: "I Hope" and "Pick Me Up" by Gabby Barrett, "Dancing in the Country" by Tyler Hubbard, "You Didn't" and "Lady" by Brett Young, "Knocking Boots" by Luke Bryan, and "Living" by Dierks Bentley. Nite was named the 2023 SESAC writer of the year.

== Biography ==
=== Early life ===
Born and raised in Amarillo, Texas, Nite first started songwriting after he saw an ad on TV for a songwriting competition which his friends "dared" him to enter.

"I sent it in. They liked it. All the critiques were relatively encouraging, like maybe you should move to Nashville," he explained in a 2016 interview with Songwriter Universe. "Some kind songwriter back in the '90s was listening to my horrible first song and giving me a pep talk. I just got hooked. I started writing as much as possible."

Following the judges advice, he moved to Nashville from Amarillo when he was 18 years old with his wife and baby, surviving on food stamps and living in a tiny apartment. He explained "I could be poor in Amarillo, Texas or I could be poor in Nashville and at least be close to something that potentially I could have a dream at". Nite studied at Belmont University's music school from which he eventually graduated.

=== Early career ===
As Nite began collaborating with different writers, he was introduced to Sony Music Publishing songwriter Ross Copperman, and they wrote their first song together, "Glass", which was cut by country duo Thompson Square and featured on their 2011 self-titled debut album. It became Nite's first hit as a songwriter, peaking at No. 15 on Billboard's Hot Country Songs chart.

Alongside Copperman, Jon Nite forged his career and created his next few hits, including Dierks Bentley's 2012 top five Country Airplay hit "Tip It On Back". Nite has since scored a number of other hits writing with Copperman, including Luke Bryan's Hot Country Songs and Country Airplay No. 1 "Strip It Down", A Thousand Horses' Country Airplay chart-topper "Smoke", Keith Urban's Airplay No. 1 "Break On Me", Darius Rucker's Airplay chart-topper "If I Told You" and Kenny Chesney's Top 10 hit "Noise".

Another regular co-writer has been Jimmy Robbins. Together, they've written Keith Urban and Miranda Lambert's "We Were Us" and Jake Owen's "Beachin'" (co-written with Jaren Johnston). Both songs reached No. 1 on the Hot Country Songs and Country Airplay charts. His other collaborations with Robbins include David Nail's Country Airplay chart-topping "Whatever She's Got" as well as Chase Rice's "Gonna Wanna Tonight" and Michael Ray's "Think a Little Less", which both peaked at No. 2 on the Country Airplay charts. Alongside Josh Osborne, the pair also wrote Tim McGraw's top five Airplay hit "Top Of The World".

=== Present career ===
Among the other artists Nite has had songs recorded by are Frankie Ballard, Lee Brice, Brett Eldredge, Love and Theft, Maddie and Tae, Chase Rice, Dallas Smith, Cole Swindell, Leah Turner and Waterloo Revival.

His awards include a CMA Triple Play honor, which he received for writing three No. 1 hits in a calendar year ("Smoke", "Strip It Down" and "Break On Me").

Nite additionally earned a 2019 Grammy nomination for Best Country Song, an ACM Nomination for Country Song of the Year, and an NSAI award for Song of the Year following his work on Cole Swindell's chart-topping ballad "Break Up In The End". Nite's recent No.1s include: "I Hope" by Gabby Barrett, "What She Wants Tonight" by Luke Bryan, and "Living" by Dierks Bentley.

== #1 Hits ==
- "Strip It Down" – Recorded by Luke Bryan
- "Break On Me" – Recorded by Keith Urban
- "We Were Us" – Recorded by Keith Urban and Miranda Lambert
- "Beachin'" – Recorded by Jake Owen
- "Whatever She's Got" – Recorded by David Nail
- "Smoke" – Recorded by A Thousand Horses
- "If I Told You" – Recorded by Darius Rucker
- "Think A Little Less" – Recorded by Michael Ray
- "Wasting Gas" – Recorded by Dallas Smith
- "Break Up In The End" – Recorded by Cole Swindell
- "Living" - Recorded by Dierks Bentley
- "I Hope" – Recorded by Gabby Barrett
- "What She Wants Tonight" – Recorded by Luke Bryan
- "Lady" – Recorded by Brett Young
- "Dancin' in the Country" - Recorded by Tyler Hubbard

== Songwriting discography ==
Singles

Year	Artist	Album	Song	Co-written with
2011	Thompson Square	Thompson Square	"Glass"	Ross Copperman
2012	JT Hodges	JT Hodges	"Goodbyes Made You Mine"	Ross Copperman, JT Hodges
2012	Dierks Bentley	Home	"Tip It On Back"	Ross Copperman, Tully Kennedy
2013	Keith Urban feat. Miranda Lambert	Fuse	"We Were Us"	Jimmy Robbins, Nicolle Galyon
2013	Jake Owen	Days of Gold	"Beachin'"	Jaren Johnston, Jimmy Robbins
2013	Lauren Alaina	—N/a	"Barefoot and Buckwild"	Chris DeStefano, Lauren Alaina
2014	Leah Turner	Leah Turner (EP)	"Pull Me Back"	Jimmy Robbins, Leah Turner
2014	Dallas Smith	Lifted	"Wastin' Gas"	Adam Craig (singer-songwriter), Matt Dragstrem
2014	Gloriana	Three	"Trouble"	Ross Copperman, Rachael Reinert, Mike Gossin
2014	Chase Rice	Ignite the Night	"Gonna Wanna Tonight"	Jimmy Robbins, Shane McAnally
2014	David Nail	I'm a Fire	"Whatever She's Got"	Jimmy Robbins
2015	Tim McGraw	Damn Country Music	"Top of the World"	Jimmy Robbins, Josh Osborne
2015	Luke Bryan	Kill the Lights	"Strip It Down"	Ross Copperman, Luke Bryan
2015	A Thousand Horses	Southernality	"Smoke"	Ross Copperman, Michael Hobby
2015	Waterloo Revival	—N/a	"Bad for You"	Ross Copperman, Cody Cooper, George Birge
2015	The Cadillac Three	Peace, Love & Dixie	"Party Like You"	Jaren Johnston, Jimmy Robbins
2016	Kenny Chesney	Cosmic Hallelujah	"Noise"	Ross Copperman, Kenny Chesney, Shane McAnally
2016	Keith Urban	Ripcord	"Break on Me"	Ross Copperman
2016	Chase Rice	—N/a	"Whisper"	Chris DeStefano, Chase Rice
2016	Michael Ray	Michael Ray	"Think a Little Less"	Thomas Rhett, Barry Dean, Jimmy Robbins
2016	Darius Rucker	-	"If I Told You"	Ross Copperman, Shane McAnally
2016	Love and Theft (duo)	-	"Candyland"	Stephen Barker Liles, Jimmy Robbins
2017	Lee Brice		"Boy"	Nicolle Galyon
2017	Dustin Lynch	Current Mood	"I'd Be Jealous Too"	Dustin Lynch, Ross Copperman
2018	Tyler Rich	Tyler Rich EP	"11:11"	Andrew Dorff, Lindsay Rimes
2018	Maddie & Tae		"Friends Don't"	Justin Ebach, Maddie Marlowe, Taylor Dye
2018	Cole Swindell	All of It	"Break Up in the End"	Chase McGill, Jessie Jo Dillon
2021	High Valley	Way Back	"Whatever It Takes"	Brad Rempel, Ben Stennis
