= Michael Ray (album) =

Studio album by Michael Ray
- Released: August 7, 2015
- Genre: Country
- Length: 37:22
- Label: Atlantic Nashville
- Producer: Scott Hendricks

Michael Ray chronology
Kiss You in the Morning EP (2015)	Michael Ray (2015)	Amos (2018)

Singles from Michael Ray
- 1. "Kiss You in the Morning" Released: February 16, 2015; 2. "Real Men Love Jesus" Released: September 14, 2015; 3. "Think a Little Less" Released: April 25, 2016

Michael Ray is the debut studio album by American country music artist Michael Ray, and his second overall. It was released on August 7, 2015 via Atlantic Nashville. The lead single, "Kiss You in the Morning", was a number one hit on the US Billboard Country Airplay chart.

== Content ==
Ray has writing credits on only one song on his debut, "Run Away with You", which he co-wrote with John Rich who first recorded the song as part of Big & Rich for their 2014 album, Gravity. Their version was released as a single on January 19, 2015 and was a Top 20 hit on the Country Airplay charts.

== Track listing ==
No.	Title	Writer(s)	Length
1.	"Kiss You in the Morning"	Justin Wilson, Michael White	3:01
2.	"Another Girl"	Rhett Akins, Chris DeStefano, Ashley Gorley	3:01
3.	"Look Like This"	Matt Jenkins, Shane McAnally, Jimmy Robbins	3:14
4.	"Real Men Love Jesus"	Lance Miller, Adam Sanders, Brad Warren, Brett Warren	3:11
5.	"Livin' It Up"	Marty Dodson, Jason Sellers, Jimmy Yeary	3:04
6.	"Run Away with You"	John Rich, Michael Ray	3:40
7.	"Think a Little Less"	Barry Dean, Jon Nite, Thomas Rhett, Robbins	2:57
8.	"Wish I Was Here"	Nathan Chapman, Nicolle Galyon, Jenkins	3:21
9.	"This Love"	Gorley, McAnally, Robbins	2:59
10.	"Drivin' All Night"	Casey Beathard, Monty Criswell	3:44
11.	"Everything In Between"	Zach Crowell, Jenkins, Nite	3:29
12.	"Somewhere South"	Jessi Alexander, C. Beathard, Tucker Beathard	3:41
Total length:			37:22

== Personnel ==
- Dave Cohen – Hammond B-3 organ, piano
- Perry Coleman – background vocals
- Charlie Judge – Hammond B-3 organ, piano
- Troy Lancaster – electric guitar
- Tony Lucido – bass guitar
- Jerry McPherson – electric guitar
- Russ Pahl – pedal steel guitar
- Danny Rader – acoustic guitar, banjo
- Michael Ray – lead vocals
- Mike Rojas – Hammond B-3 organ, piano
- Adam Shoenfeld – electric guitar
- Nir Z. – drums, percussion

== Chart performance ==
The album debuted on the Billboard 200 at No. 21, and the Top Country Albums chart at No. 4, with 11,300 copies sold in the US in its first week. The album has sold 51,000 copies in the US as of January 2017.

=== Album ===
Chart (2015–17)	Peak position
Australian Albums (ARIA)	60
US Billboard 200	21
US Top Country Albums (Billboard)	4

=== Singles ===
Year	Single	Peak chart positions				
Year	Single	US Country	US Country Airplay	US	CAN Country	CAN
2015	"Kiss You in the Morning"	10	1	55	13	73
2015	"Real Men Love Jesus"	28	17	—	44	—
2016	"Think a Little Less"	4	2	54	41	—
"—" denotes releases that did not chart
