= I'm Good =

I'm Good may refer to:

- I'm Good (Abby Anderson EP) (2018)
- I'm Good (Hahm Eun-jung EP) (2015)
- "I'm Good" (Blaque song), 2003
- "I'm Good" (Clipse song), 2009
- "I'm Good (Blue)", song by David Guetta and Bebe Rexha
- I'm Good, a 2006 mixtape by rappers Yukmouth and Killa Klump
- "I'm Good", a song by K.Flay from her album Life as a Dog (2014)
- "I'm Good", a song by Schoolboy Q on his album Setbacks (2011)

== See also ==
- "I'm God", song by Clams Casino and Imogen Heap
