= Did It for the Party =

Studio album by Big & Rich
- Released: September 15, 2017
- Genre: Country
- Length: 41:51
- Label: Big & Rich Records/Thirty Tigers
- Producer: Big Kenny; John Rich

Big & Rich chronology
Gravity (2014)	Did It for the Party (2017)

Singles from Did It for the Party
- 1. "California" Released: March 6, 2017

Did It for the Party is the sixth studio album by American country music duo Big & Rich. It was released on September 15, 2017 via Big & Rich Records/Thirty Tigers. The album's lead single is "California".

== Content ==
Group member John Rich told Billboard that "there’s some 80s Country on there, and also some Eagles west-coast Country kind of stuff. It’s also a really fun song to sing. When the fans learn it, they sing it at the top of their lungs."

Lead single "California" was originally recorded by Tim McGraw on his album Damn Country Music, and his version features Big & Rich on backing vocals.

== Critical reception ==
Giving it 2.5 out of 5 stars, Stephen Thomas Erlewine of Allmusic thought that the album had a sense of "melancholy" that was "undone by the duo doubling down on polish while halfheartedly insisting on living it up on the margins." He thought "Wake Up Wanting You" and "Smoke in Her Eyes" were "ingratiating" but said that "the sentimental moments are too sticky".

== Commercial performance ==
The album debuted at No. 2 on Billboard's Top Country Albums chart, with 26,000 copies sold in the first week (27,000 including streams and tracks). It has sold 38,700 copies in the United States as of November 2017.

== Track listing ==
No.	Title	Writer(s)	Length
1.	"California"	John Rich; Rodney Clawson; Vicky McGehee	3:22
2.	"Did It for the Party"	Big Kenny; Brandon Day; Marty Dodson	3:01
3.	"Congratulations (You're a Rockstar)"	Big Kenny; Rich; Phil Vassar	3:21
4.	"Turns Me On"	Big Kenny; William Kebler; Zach Lockwood; Eric Webb	3:42
5.	"Wake Up Wanting You"	Big Kenny; Rich; Vassar	2:57
6.	"Smoke in Her Eyes"	Rich; Clawson; McGehee	3:11
7.	"No Sleep"	Brandon Day; Big Kenny; Michael Whitworth	3:13
8.	"We Came to Rawk"	Rich	2:40
9.	"Funk in the Country"	Matt Dragstrem; Sonia Leigh; Josh Thompson	3:34
10.	"The Long Way Home"	Big Kenny; Adam Shoenfeld; Taylor Davis; Lockwood	3:36
11.	"Freedom Road"	Big Kenny; Rich; Vassar	3:24
12.	"My Son" (featuring The Isaacs)	Rich	2:35
13.	"Lie, Cheat, or Steal"	Big Kenny; Dodson; Mark Nesler	3:15
Total length:			41:51

== Charts ==
Chart (2017)	Peak position
US Billboard 200	9
US Top Country Albums (Billboard)	2
US Independent Albums (Billboard)	1
