= After a Few =

Song by Travis Denning

Single by Travis Denning

from the EP Beer's Better Cold
- Released: January 28, 2019
- Genre: Country
- Length: 3:35
- Label: Mercury Nashville
- Songwriters: Travis Denning; Kelly Archer; Justin Weaver
- Producer: Jeremy Stover

Travis Denning singles chronology
"David Ashley Parker from Powder Springs" (2018)	"After a Few" (2019)	"Where That Beer's Been" (2020)

"After a Few" is a song co-written and recorded by American country music singer Travis Denning. It is his second single for Mercury Nashville. Denning wrote the song with Kelly Archer and Justin Weaver.

== Content and history ==
Tina Benitez-Eves of American Songwriter describes the song as "a cautious tale about looking for relationships in all the wrong places." Denning said that he wanted the song's message to "capture that story of that frustration and just that moment where you go, God, why can’t I do this? Why can’t I get past this?" The title refers to the progress of such a relationship "after a few" alcoholic drinks.

== Charts ==
"After a Few" set a new record for the longest run on the Billboard Country Airplay chart in May 2020. For the week ending May 9, 2020, it achieved this record when it spent its 60th week on the chart. It peaked at number one on the same chart in its 65th week, also a record for slowest ascent. This record was tied in 2022 by Michael Ray's "Whiskey and Rain". Both songs would later be surpassed by Justin Moore's "Time's Ticking" in April 2026.

=== Weekly charts ===
Chart (2019–2020)	Peak position
Canada Hot 100 (Billboard)	59
Canada Country (Billboard)	2
US Billboard Hot 100	31
US Country Airplay (Billboard)	1
US Hot Country Songs (Billboard)	7

=== Year-end charts ===
Chart (2020)	Position
US Country Airplay (Billboard)	4
US Hot Country Songs (Billboard)	25

== Certifications ==
Region	Certification	Certified units/sales
Canada (Music Canada)	Gold	40,000^{‡}
United States (RIAA)	Platinum	1,000,000^{‡}
^{‡} Sales+streaming figures based on certification alone.
