= Jimmy Robbins =

American songwriter and producer (born 1989)

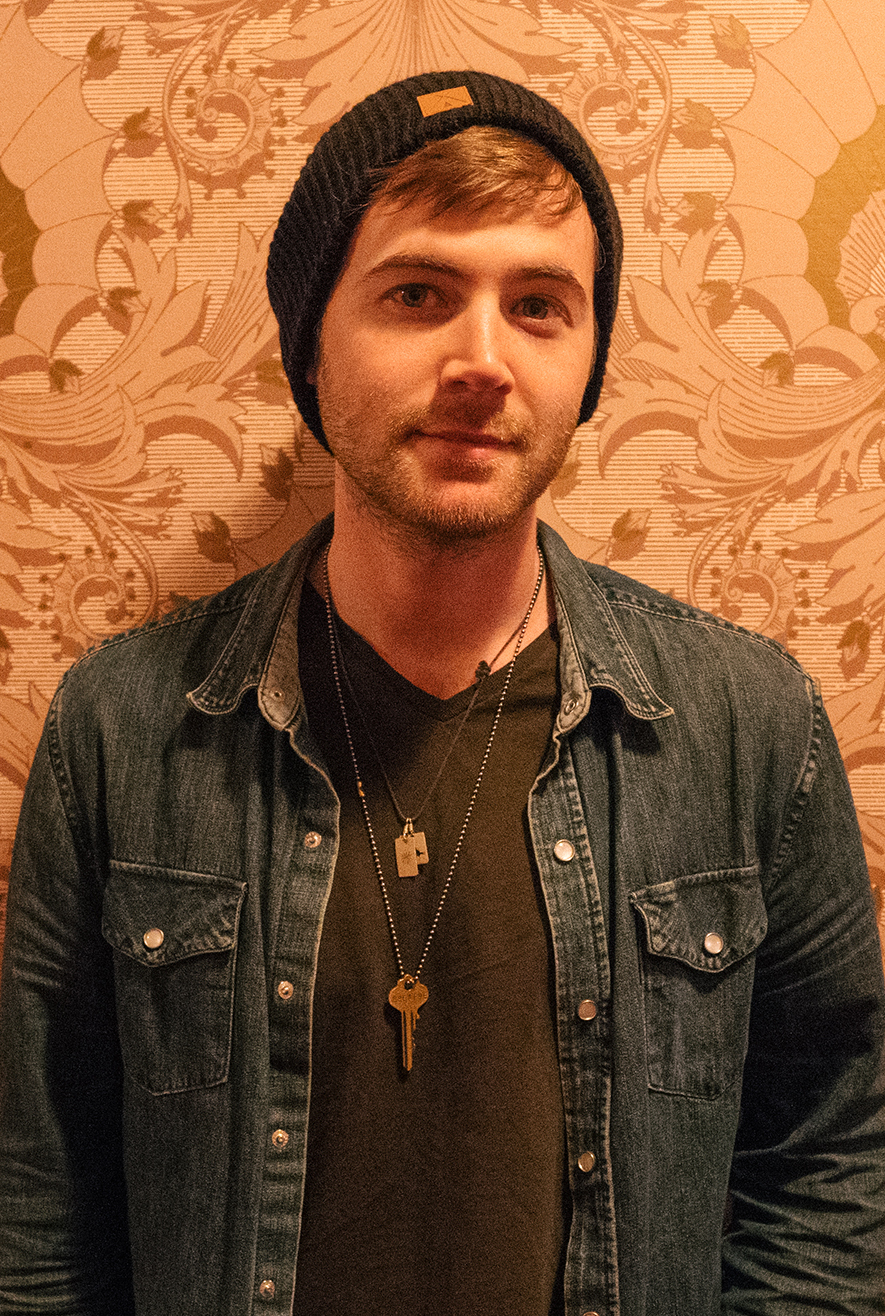
- Robbins in 2018

Background information
- Born: James Michael Robbins; September 3, 1989 (age 37); Raleigh, North Carolina, U.S.
- Genres: Pop; pop rock; country
- Occupations: Songwriter; record producer; musician
- Instruments: Vocals; guitar
- Years active: 2005–present
- Label: Universal Motown (2007–2009)
- Website: jrmpublishing.com

James Michael Robbins (born September 3, 1989) is an American record producer and songwriter, best known for his work in contemporary country music.

== Career ==
In addition to having penned ten number-one singles, he won a CMA Triple Play Award in 2014 for having three #1 songs in a twelve-month period as well as winning the ASCAP country song of the year for Thomas Rhett's It Goes Like This. His songs "We Were Us", performed by Keith Urban and Miranda Lambert, won the Musical Event of the Year award at the 2014 CMA Awards, the CMA song of the year in 2020 for "The Bones" by Maren Morris and CMA Musical Event of The Year award for his cowritten and coproduced "Half Of My Hometown" by Kelsea Ballerini featuring Kenny Chesney Robbins has produced songs for artists Keith Urban, Kelsea Ballerini, Brett Young, Canaan Smith, Carly Pearce, Cole Swindell, Colbie Caillat, Gnash, Chrissy Metz, Eli Young Band, Maddie and Tae, Mickey Guyton, Maren Morris, RaeLynn, Sabrina Carpenter, and Trent Harmon.

Since 2016 Robbins and his wife, Sarah Robbins, own and operate Mailbox Money Music, a boutique publishing company based out of Nashville with a roster of writers working in multiple genres. Current writers include Robbins, Eric Arjes, Steven Lee Olsen, Dawson Anderson, and On The Outside.

== Personal life ==
On April 16, 2016, Robbins married Sarah Boddie in Gulfport, Mississippi. Their daughter Lily was born in January 2018. Their son Ridge was born in December 2020.

== Select songwriting discography ==
Songs written or co-written by Robbins.

Discography
Artist	Album	Song	
Abby Anderson	I'm Good (2018)	"This Feeling"	
Adrien Nunez	Single (2024)	"Minnesota"	
Alexz Johnson	Skipping Stone (2012)	"Back of the Room"	
Alexz Johnson	Skipping Stone (2012)	"Pleased To Meet You"	
Alexz Johnson	Skipping Stone (2012)	"Skipping Stone"	
Alexz Johnson	Skipping Stone (2012)	"Walking"	
Alexandra Kay	Second Wind (2025)	"Straight For The Heart"	
Amanda Jordan	Single (2022)	"Break Your Heart"	
Andrew Hyatt	Single (2018)	"Do It With You"	
Andrew Hyatt	CAIN	"Habit"	
Andrew McMahon in the Wilderness	Zombies On Broadway (album) (2017)	"Dead Man's Dollar"	
Andrew McMahon in the Wilderness	Zombies On Broadway (album) (2017)	"Throwing Punches" (Zombies demo)	
Andrew McMahon in the Wilderness	Zombies On Broadway (album) (2017)	"Rich Kids With Summer Jobs" (Zombies demo)	
Andy Brown	Cedarmont (2018)	"About Last Night"	
Andy Brown	Cedarmont (2018)	"Hollow"	
Ashley Cooke	Already Drank That Beer: Side A (2021)	"The Opposite Of Love"	
Ashley Cooke	Shot In The Dark (2023)	"Mean Girl" Ft. Colbie Caillat	
Ashley Cooke	Shot In The Dark (2023)	"Tryin' To Love You"	
Ashley Cooke	Wrapped (2026)	"Wrapped"	
Ashley Gearing	Train Track EP (2015)	"Cry Baby"	
Ashley Gearing	Train Track EP (2015)	"Train Track"	
Austin Snell	Colors (2026)	"My Favorite Scar"	
Austin Snell	Single (2026)	Something's Always Breaking	
Badland Sons	Single (2020)	"Wild"	
Bailey Zimmerman and Diplo	Single (2025)	"Ashes"	
The Band Camino	The Band Camino (2021)	"Damage"	
The Band Camino	NeverAlways (vol. 2) (2026)	"Talk Cheap, Die Broke"	
Beamer Wigley	Meteorite (2016)	"Greener"	
Ben Kweller	Cover The Mirror (2025)	"Don't Cave"	
Billy Currington	Summer Forever (2015)	"Wake Me Up"	
Billy Currington	Summer Forever (2015)	"Jonesin"	
Ben Platt	Honeymind (2024)	"Treehouse Ft. Brandy Clark"	
Ben Platt	Honeymind (2024)	"Shoe To Drop"	
Ben Platt	Honeymind (2024)	"Boy Who Hung The Moon"	
Blake Shelton	Based on a True Story… (2013)	"Sure Be Cool If You Did"	
Brandy Clark	Brandy Clark (2023)	"Ain't Enough Rocks"	
Brandy Clark	Brandy Clark (2023)	"Up Above The Clouds"	
Breland (musician) and Shania Twain	Twisters soundtrack (2024)	"Boots Don't"	
Brett Kissel	We Were That Song (2017)	"That's How The World Ends"	
Brett Young	Brett Young (2017)	"Close Enough"	
Brett Young	Brett Young (2017)	"Left Side Of Leavin'"	
Brett Young	Ticket To L.A. (2018)	"Reason To Stay"	
Brett Young	Ticket To L.A. (2018)	"Used To Missing You"	
Brett Young	Weekends Look A Little Different These Days (2021)	"Dear Me"	
Brett Young	Weekends Look A Little Different These Days (2021)	"You Didn't"	
Brett Young	Weekends Look A Little Different These Days (2021)	"You Got Away With It"	
Brett Young	Father Stu (film) (2022)	"Long Way Home"	
Brett Young	Across The Sheets (2023)	"Dance With You"	
Brett Young	Brett Young 2.0 (2025)	"Kiss To Forget"	
Brett Young	Brett Young 2.0 (2025)	"Goodnight Into Good Morning"	
Brett Young	Brett Young 2.0 (2025)	"That Ain't Yours"	
Brian Kelley (musician)	Sunshine State Of Mind (2022)	"By Boat"	
Brian Kelley (musician)	"Tennessee Truth" (2024)	"Dirt Road Date Night"	
Brian Kelley (musician)	"Tennessee Truth" (2024)	"How We're Livin"	
The Cadillac Three	Bury Me In My Boots (2016)	"Party Like You"	
The Cadillac Three	Bury Me In My Boots (2016)	"This Accent"	
The Cadillac Three	Country Fuzz (2019)	"Heat"	
Callista Clark	Real To Me: The Way I Feel (2022)	"Sad"	
Callum Kerr	Roots Under Me(2025)	"All Out Of Me"	
Callum Kerr	Roots Under Me(2025)	"Silver Lining"	
Calynn Green	Single (2020)	"Chills"	
Canaan Smith	Bronco (2015)	"Love At First"	
Carly Pearce	Carly Pearce (2020)	"Halfway Home"	
Carly Pearce	Carly Pearce (2020)	"Woman Down"	
Carly Pearce	"29" (2021)	"Messy"	
Carly Pearce	"Hummingbird" (2025)	"If Looks Could Kill"	
Carson Boatman	Single (2019)	"Country"	
Cassadee Pope	Summer (2016)	"Piano"	
Catherine McGrath	Talk Of This Town (2018)	"Good At Love"	
Catherine McGrath	Talk Of This Town (2018)	"Just In Case"	
Catherine McGrath	Talk Of This Town (2018)	"The Edges"	
CB30	Single (2020)	"We Are Right Now"	
Chad Brownlee	Hearts on Fire (2016)	"Gone Gone"	
Chad Brownlee	Hearts on Fire (2016)	"Somethin' We Shouldn't Do"	
Charles Kelley	Single (2022)	"As Far As You Could"	
Chase Rice	Ignite the Night (2014)	"Gonna Wanna Tonight"	
Chase Rice	The Record (2021)	"Bedroom"	
Chris Lane Ft. Scotty McCreery	Single (2021)	"Small Town On It"	
Chris Young	I Didn't Come Here To Leave (2025)	"Pour Some Whiskey On It"	
Christina Grimmie	Single (2020)	"Cry Wolf"	
Clare Dunn	Put You Into Words (2018)	"Put You Into Words"	
Colbie Caillat	This Time Around (2025)	"Can't Say No" ft. Ryan Hurd	
Colbie Caillat	This Time Around (2025)	"Kinda Single" ft. Lee Brice	
Colbie Caillat	This Time Around (2025)	"Live Without" ft. Maddie and Tae	
Colby!	Single (2026)	"Small Town Sins"	
Colby!	Single (2026)	"Who's Your Angel"	
"Pleased To Meet You"	Cole Swindell	Spanish Moss (2025)	"Happy Hour Sad"
Dallas Smith	Tippin' Point (2014)	"A Girl Like You"	
Dallas Smith	Lifted (2014)	"Thinkin' 'Bout You"	
Dallas Smith	Side Effects (2016)	"One Little Kiss"	
Dallas Smith	Side Effects (2016)	"Sleepin' Around"	
Dallas Smith	Dallas Smith (2023)	"Good Time Getting There"	
Dan + Shay	Obsessed (2016)	"All Nighter"	
Dan + Shay	Obsessed (2016)	"Already Ready"	
Dan + Shay	"Dan + Shay" (2018)	"Island Time"	
Dan + Shay	Bigger Houses (2023)	"Heartbreak On The Map"	
Dan + Shay	Bigger Houses (2023)	"What Took You So Long"	
Dan + Shay	Young (2026)	"Say So"	
Dan + Shay	Young (2026)	"Forever Like This"	
Dan + Shay	Young (2026)	"Bible In The Truck"	
Dan Smalley	If I'm Being Honest (2020)	"Till Country Comes Back"	
Danielle Bradbery	Single (2022)	"A Special Place"	
Darling Brando	Single (2020)	"Nightlights"	
David Fanning	—N/a	"Doin' Country Right"	
David Nail	I'm a Fire (2014)	"Whatever She's Got"	
Dierks Bentley	Black (2016)	"Pick Up"	
Demps	Single (2024)	"Bitch On Wine"	
Demps	Single (2024)	"If You Were A Country Girl"	
Demps	Single (2024)	"Who's Who"	
Demps	Single (2024)	"Forgot To Take A Picture"	
Demps	Single (2024)	"Rough Cut Diamond"	
Demps	Single (2025)	"I Care What You Think"	
Due West	—N/a	"Move Like That"	
Dustin Lynch	Where It's At (2014)	"Halo"	
Dustin Lynch	Where It's At (2014)	"Sing It To Me"	
Dustin Lynch	Current Mood (2017)	"Why Not Tonight"	
Dylan Scott	Dylan Scott (2016)	"Back"	
Easton Corbin	Let's Do Country Right (2023)	"In It"	
Eli Young Band	10,000 Towns (2014)	"Let's Do Something Tonight"	
Eli Young Band	Fingerprints (2017)	"Never Again"	
Eli Young Band	Love Talking (2022)	"Lucky For Me"	
Eli Young Band	Love Talking (2022)	"Tell Me It Is"	
Eli Young Band	Strange Hours (2025)	"Whiskey Told Ya (Feat. Corey Kent)"	
Eli Young Band	Strange Hours (2025)	"Everybody Else"	
Eli Young Band	Strange Hours (2025)	"Settle For Your Sometimes"	
Eli Young Band	Strange Hours (2025)	"Pretty Good Day For The Bar"	
Emily Reid	Wine EP (2019)	"Wine"	
Emily Weisband	Single (2021)	"New Salt"	
Eric Ethridge	Single (2020)	"Gasoline"	
Eric Ethridge	Single (2020)	"Forever With You"	
Eric Paslay	Single (2023)	"Best Friends"	
Eric Paslay	Single (2023)	"Perfect Stranger"	
Filmore	Single (2020)	"Me Lately"	
Florida Georgia Line	This Is How We Roll (2013)	"Headphones"	
Florida Georgia Line	Anything Goes (2014)	"Girl On The Radio"	
Gabby Barrett	Gold Mine (2020)	"Thank God"	
Gabby Barrett	Chapter and Verse (2024)	"Growing Up Raising You"	
Gabby Barrett	Single (2026)	"In On It"	
George Canyon	I Got This (2016)	"Daughters Of The Sun"	
Gloriana	Three (2015)	"Get Back That Goodbye"	
Gnash (musician)	We (2018)	"Dear Insecurity"	
Gnash (musician)	We (2018)	"Feel Better"	
Gnash (musician)	We (2018)	"Insane"	
Gnash (musician)	We (2018)	"Nobody's Home"	
Gnash (musician)	We (2018)	"The Broken Hearts Club"	
Gnash (musician)	We (2018)	"Pajamas"	
Gnash (musician)	Single (2023)	"The Art Of Letting Go"	
Gone West (band)	Canyons (2020)	"When To Say Goodbye"	
Hailey Whitters	Raised (2021)	"College Town"	
Hailey Whitters	I'm In Love (2023)	"Bad Love"	
Hannah Ellis	That Girl (2024)	"Still"	
HunterGirl	Single (2022)	"Hometown Out Of Me"	
HunterGirl	Single (2023)	"Lonely Outta You"	
Hunter Hayes	The 21 Project (2015)	"I Mean You"	
Idina Menzel	Drama Queen (2023)	"Make Me Hate Me"	
Ivory Layne	Single (2020)	"God Save The Queens"	
Jake Owen	Days of Gold (2013)	"Beachin'"	
Jake Owen	Days of Gold (2013)	"One Little Kiss (Never Killed Nobody)"	
Jake Owen	Greetings From...Jake (2019)	"In It"	
Jana Kramer	Thirty One (2015)	"All I've Got"	
Jana Kramer	Thirty One (2015)	"Last Song"	
Jana Kramer	Thirty One (2015)	"Love"	
Jaren Johnston	The Guest Room (2026)	Fire Works	
Jason Aldean	They Don't Know (2016)	"Lights Come On"	
Jason Aldean	Songs About Us (2026)	"Easier Gone" Ft. Brittany Aldean	
Jay Webb	Single (2025)	"Whiskey Wishes"	
Jenna Davis	Single (2025)	"On A Budget"	
Jenna Raine	Jeans, Boys and Jesus (2026)	"God Made Him"	
Jenna Raine	Jeans, Boys and Jesus (2026)	"So Far So Good"	
Jenna Raine	Jeans, Boys and Jesus (2026)	"I See What You're Saying	
Jenna Raine	Jeans, Boys and Jesus (2026)	"A lot like breaking up"	
Jenna Raine	EP (2026)	Frosty	
Jenna Raine	EP (2026)	A Baby Was Born	
Jennifer Nettles	Playing with Fire (2016)	"Hey Heartbreak"	
Jerrod Niemann	This Ride(2017)	"But I Do"	
Jimmie Allen	Mercury Lane (2018)	"How To Be Single"	
John K	Single (2025)	"River"	
John King	—N/a	"Baseball Cap"	
Josh Ross	Later Tonight (2025)	"Mad At Me"	
Josh Ross	Later Tonight (2025)	"My Side Of Town"	
Joy Oladokun and Maren Morris	Single (2021)	"Bigger Man"	
JP Saxe and Maren Morris	Single (2020)	"Line By Line"	
Keith Urban	Fuse (2013)	"Gonna B Good"	
Keith Urban	Fuse (2013)	"We Were Us" (with Miranda Lambert)	
Keith Urban	Graffiti U (2018)	"Drop Top (feat. Kassi Ashton)"	
Kellie Pickler	—N/a	"Feelin' Tonight"	
Kelly Clarkson	Piece by Piece (2015)	"Good Goes the Bye"	
Kelsea Ballerini	Unapologetically (2017)	"In Between"	
Kelsea Ballerini	Unapologetically (2017)	"Music"	
Kelsea Ballerini	Kelsea (2020)	"Homecoming Queen"	
Kelsea Ballerini	Kelsea (2020)	"Club"	
Kelsea Ballerini	Kelsea (2020)	"Half Of My Hometown"	
Kelsea Ballerini	Kelsea (2020)	"Bragger"	
Kelsea Ballerini	Kelsea (2020)	"Country Song"	
Kelsea Ballerini	Subject To Change (2022)	"Walk In The Park"	
Kimberly Perry	Super Bloom (2023)	"If I Die Young Pt. 2"	
Kimberly Perry	Super Bloom (2023)	"Burn The House Down"	
Kimberly Perry	Super Bloom (2023)	"Ghosts"	
Kimberly Perry	Super Bloom (2023)	"Black Corvette"	
Kimberly Perry	Super Bloom (2023)	"God's Hometown"	
Kimberly Perry	Super Bloom (2023)	"Fool's Gold"	
King Calaway	Rivers (2019)	"A Picture Of The Way You Are"	
Kyd The Band	Kyd The Band (2017)	"Ice Cream"	
Kyd The Band	Kyd The Band (2017)	"Wishful Thinking"	
Kyd The Band	Character Development (2020)	"Easy" featuring Elley Duhé	
Kyd The Band	Character Development (2020)	"This Time Last Year”	
Kyd The Band	Character Development (2020)	"Heartbreak Anthem" featuring Gnash (musician)	
Kyd The Band	Character Development (2020)	"Hard Feelings"	
Kyd The Band	Season 3 (2020)	"I'll Stay"	
Kyd The Band	Season 3 (2020)	"Love Somebody Else"	
Laci Kaye Booth	Self Titled (2021)	"Treasure"	
Lady Antebellum	747 (2014)	"All Nighter"	
Lanie Gardner	Polaroids (2025)	"Boys Like You"	
LANY	Soft (2025)	"Soft"	
LANY	Soft (2025)	"When Did You Stop Loving Me"	
Lauren Spencer Smith	The Art Of Being A Mess (2025)	"Looking Up"	
Leah Turner	Leah Turner (2014)	"Pull Me Back"	
Leanna Crawford	Thank God (2026)	"Revenge"	
Leaving Austin	Single (2019)	"She Can"	
Levi Hummon	Levi Hummon EP (2016)	"Chain Reaction"	
Levi Hummon	Levi Hummon EP (2016)	"Life's For Livin'"	
Levi Hummon	Levi Hummon EP (2016)	"Love You Hate You Miss You"	
Levi Hummon	Levi Hummon EP (2016)	"Window Down Days"	
Levi Hummon	Patient EP (2019)	"Tough Love"	
Levi Hummon	Single (2019)	"Night Lights"	
Levi Hummon	Single (2019)	"Drop Of Us"	
Levi Hummon	Single (2020)	"Good Taste"	
Levi Hummon	Single (2022)	"For Me"	
Levi Hummon	Single (2024)	"Another Shot"	
Lindsay Ell	TBA (2016)	"All Alright"	
Lindsay James	The Wavy EP (2024)	"What To Do With Myself"	
Logan Mize	Single (2020)	"Who Didn't"	
Love and Theft	Whiskey on My Breath (2015)	"Hang Out Hungover"	
Love and Theft	"TBA" (2016)	"Candyland"	
Lucy Hale	Road Between (2014)	"From the Backseat"	
Lucy Hale	Road Between (2014)	"Those Three Words"	
Luke Bryan	Kill the Lights (2015)	"Corner Booth"	
Luke Bryan	Single (2022)	"Prayin' In A Deer Stand"	
Luke Bryan	Signs (2026)	"I Liked Loving You"	
Mackenzie Carpenter	Single (2026)	"High Pony"	
Maddie & Tae	Start Here (2015)	"No Place Like You"	
Maddie & Tae	The Way It Feels (2020)	"Everywhere I'm Goin'"	
Maddie & Tae	The Way It Feels (2020)	"I Don't Need To Know"	
Maddie & Tae	The Way It Feels (2020)	"Tourist In This Town"	
Maddie & Tae	The Way It Feels (2020)	"Tryin' On Rings"	
Maddie & Tae	The Way It Feels (2020)	"Water In His Wine Glass"	
Maddie & Tae	Breakthrough	"People Need People"	
Maddie & Tae	Single (2021	"Mood Ring"	
Maddie & Tae	Through the Madness, Vol. 1 (2022)	"Strangers"	
Maddie & Tae	Through the Madness, Vol. 2 (2022)	"More Than Maybe"	
Maddie & Tae	Through the Madness, Vol. 2 (2022)	Well In Your World"	
Madeline Edwards	Crash Landed (2022)	"Mama Dolly Jesus"	
Madeline Merlo	One House Down (from the Girl Next Door) (2024)	"Good Grief"	
Maggie Rose	Dreams > Dollars - EP (2017)	"More Dreams Than Dollars"	
Maggie Rose	Dreams > Dollars - EP (2017)	"Too Many Love Songs"	
Maoli	Single (2024)	"Whiskey Doesn't Work"	
Maren Morris	Hero (2016)	"I Could Use a Love Song"	
Maren Morris	Girl (2019)	"The Feels"	
Maren Morris	Girl (2019)	"A Song For Everything"	
Maren Morris	Girl (2019)	"Flavor"	
Maren Morris	Girl (2019)	"The Bones (song)"	
Maren Morris	Single (2020)	"Better Than We Found It"	
Maren Morris	Humble Quest (2021)	"Circles Around This Town"	
Maren Morris	Humble Quest (2021)	"Background Music"	
Maren Morris	Humble Quest (2021)	"Humble Quest"	
Maren Morris	Humble Quest (2021)	"Nervous"	
Maren Morris	The Bridge (2023)	"The Tree"	
Maren Morris	The Bridge (2023)	"Get The Hell Out Of Here"	
Maren Morris	Single (2025)	"Welcome To The End"	
Maren Morris	Dreamsicle: Deluxe (2025)	"Be A Bitch"	
Maren Morris	Dreamsicle: Deluxe (2025)	"Earth Angel"	
Maren Morris	Dreamsicle: Deluxe (2025)	"In Love With Me"	
Maren Morris	Single (2025)	"Beat The Devil"	
Maren Morris	Single (2026)	"Parachute"	
Mary Sarah	Just Go With It (2017)	"Just Go With It"	
MaRynn Taylor	Single (2021)	"I Know A Girl"	
Matt Ferranti	Matt Ferranti (2020)	"New Ways To Love You"	
Matt Ferranti	Matt Ferranti (2020)	"Love Somebody"	
Matt Ferranti	Matt Ferranti (2020)	"Outta My Radio"	
Matt Ferranti	Matt Ferranti (2020)	"Heaven To Me"	
Matt Simons	When The Lights Go Down (2016)	"Take Me Home"	
Matt Simons	Sun In California (2025)	"Word After Word"	
Megan and Liz	—N/a	"Long Distance"	
Megan and Liz	—N/a	"Old School Love"	
Megan and Liz	—N/a	"Run Away"	
Michael Ray	Michael Ray (2015)	"Look Like This"	
Michael Ray	Michael Ray (2015)	"Think a Little Less"	
Michael Ray	Michael Ray (2015)	"This Love"	
Michael Ray	Amos (2018)	"Drink One For Me"	
Mickey Guyton	Remember Her Name (2021)	"Indigo"	
Mike Parker	Single 2023	"Thinking Of You"	
Mike Parker	Single 2023	"Better Man"	
Mike Parker	Single 2023	"Sawdust"	
Mike Parker	Single 2023	"Bluejean Masterpiece"	
Mike Parker	Single 2024	"Love You On My Mind"	
Mike Parker	Single 2024	"Going On Forever"	
Mike Parker	Single 2024	"H2Over You"	
Mike Parker	Single 2025	"You Won't Let Me"	
Miranda Lambert	Platinum	"Babies Makin' Babies"	
Miranda Lambert	Platinum	"Girls"	
Miranda Lambert	Platinum	"Priscilla"	
Mitchell Tenpenny ft. Colbie Caillat	The 3rd (2024)	"Guess We'll Never Know"	
Morgan Evans (singer)	Single (2021)	"Christmas In The Sun"	
Morgan Evans (singer)	Life Upside Down(2023)	"Hey Little Mama"	
Morgan Wallen	I'm The Problem (2025)	"Dark Til Daylight"	
Morgan Wallen	I'm The Problem (2025)	"Drinking Til It Does"	
Nash Overstreet	U Don't Get 2 Do That ep (2017)	"Brand New Man"	
Nicolle Galyon	First Born (2022)	"Sunflower"	
Nicolle Galyon	First Born (2022)	"Death Bed"	
Ne-Yo	Highway 79 (album) (2026)	"Wish I Didn't Know You"	
Old Dominion	Meat and Candy (2015)	"Til It's Over"	
On The Outside	Single (2021)	"Sleepless"	
On The Outside	Single (2023)	"Go Broke"	
On The Outside	Single (2023)	"Act Like You Don't"	
On The Outside	Single (2023)	"Country Music Never Broke My Heart"	
OSMR	Sweet Life EP (2017)	"Lookin' At You"	
OSMR	Sweet Life EP (2017)	"Sweet Life"	
Quinn Lewis	Single (2021)	"Don't Love Back"	
Rachel Wammack	Rachel Wammack EP (2018)	"Hard To Believe"	
Rachel Wammack	Single (2020)	"What He Does"	
RaeLynn	Me (2015)	"Careless"	
RaeLynn	Me (2015)	"Kissin' Frogs"	
RaeLynn	Always Sing (2015)	"Always Sing"	
RaeLynn	WildHorse (2016)		
RaeLynn	WildHorse (2016)	"Diamonds"	
RaeLynn	WildHorse (2016)	"Graveyard"	
RaeLynn	WildHorse (2016)	"Insecure"	
RaeLynn	WildHorse (2016)	"Love Triangle (song)"	
RaeLynn	WildHorse (2016)	"Say (Feat. Dan + Shay)"	
RaeLynn	WildHorse (2016)	"Your Heart"	
RaeLynn	Origins (2018)	"Dirty Word"	
RaeLynn	Baytown (2021)	"She Chose Me"	
Ray Gibson	—N/a	"In Your Kiss"	
Redferrin	Been There Done That(2026)	"Have You Now"	
Redferrin	Been There Done That(2026)	"3 Day Bender"	
Redferrin	Been There Done That(2026)	"Whiskey Money"	
Reyna Roberts	Single (2022)	"Another Round"	
Robyn Ottolini	Growing Up To Do (2024)	"House I Grew Up In"	
Rodney Atkins	True South (2026)	"Silver Bullets"	
Ryan Hurd	Pelago (2021)	"The Knife Or The Hatchet"	
Ryan Hurd	Single (2026)	"Emergency Contact"	
Sabrina Carpenter	EVOlution (2016)	"Run and Hide"	
Sacha	Woman In The Mirror (2025)	"Missing Out"	
Sam Fischer	Not a Hobby (2018)	"This City"	
Sara Evans	Slow Me Down (2014)	"Slow Me Down"	
Sara Evans	Words (2017)	"Marquee Sign"	
Sara Evans	Words (2017)	"Words"	
Sara Kays	Reasons To Call You (2025)	"Crush"	
Sasha Sloan	Me Again (2024)	"Highlights"	
Sasha Sloan	Me Again (2024)	"Don't Laugh I'll Cry"	
Scotty McCreery	See You Tonight (2013)	"Before Midnight"	
Tate Butts	Something To Believe In (2026)	"When I Pray"	
Temecula Road	What If I Kissed You (2017)	"What If I Kissed You"	
Temecula Road	Hoping (2017)	"Hoping"	
The Shires (duo)	Accidentally On Purpose (2018)	"Accidentally On Purpose"	
The Shires (duo)	Accidentally On Purpose (2018)	"Echo"	
The Swon Brothers	The Swon Brothers (2014)	"What I'm Thinking About"	
The Tragic Thrills	The Tragic Thrills	"Crazy"	
Tim McGraw	Damn Country Music (2015)	"Top of the World"	
Thomas Rhett	It Goes Like This (2013)	"It Goes Like This"	
Thomas Rhett	It Goes Like This (2013)	"Sorry For Partyin"	
Thomas Rhett	Tangled Up (2015)	"Anthem"	
Thomas Rhett	Tangled Up (2015)	"Learned It From The Radio"	
Thompson Square	Just Feels Good (2013)	"Home Is You"	
Tori Kelly	A Tori Kelly Christmas (2020)	"Gift That Keeps On Giving"	
Trent Harmon	You Got 'Em All (2018)	"Her"	
Trent Harmon	You Got 'Em All (2018)	"My Somebody"	
Trent Harmon	You Got 'Em All (2018)	"There's a Girl"	
Trent Harmon	You Got 'Em All (2018)	"On Paper"	
Trent Harmon	Scars and Sins (2025)	"Scars and Sins"	
Trent Harmon	Scars and Sins (2025)	"Make Her Laugh"	
Walker Hayes	8 Tracks (2019)	"Acceptance Speech"	
Walker Hayes	Single (2020)	"Trash My Heart"	
Waterloo Revival	Front Row EP (2016)	"I Could Get Used To This"	
Waterloo Revival	Front Row EP (2016)	"Meet Up In The Middle"	
Willow Avalon	Pink Pocket Pistol (2026)	"God Help The Next One"	
Witt Lowry ft Kyd The Band	If You Don't Like The Story Write Your Own (2023)	"Hurt Alone"	
Zach John King	Single (2024)	"Hole In The Wall"	
Zach John King	I'm What You Get (2026)	"I'm What You Get"	
Zach John King	I'm What You Get (2026)	"Way To Go" ft Brooks and Dunn	
Zach John King	I'm What You Get (2026)	"Homegrown Heaven"	
Zach John King	I'm What You Get (2026)	"High Like Her"	

== Select production discography ==
Year	Artist	Song(s)/Album	Details
2012	Alexz Johnson	Skipping Stone	Producer
2015	RaeLynn	"Me EP"	Producer
2015	Canaan Smith	Canaan Smith (EP)	Co-producer with Brett Beavers
2015	Canaan Smith	Bronco	Co-producer with Brett Beavers
2015	John King	"Baseball Cap"	Producer
2016	Levi Hummon	Levi Hummon EP	Producer
2016	Matt Simons (2016)	"Lose Control (Acoustic Version)"	Producer
2016	Matt Simons (2016)	"Take Me Home"	Producer
2016	RaeLynn	Wild Horse (album)	Co-producer with Nicolle Galyon
2016	Sabrina Carpenter	Run and Hide	Producer
2016	Trent Harmon	There's A Girl	Producer
2016	Waterloo Revival (2016)	"I Could Get Used To This"	Producer
2016	Waterloo Revival (2016)	"Meet Up In The Middle"	Producer
2017	Maggie Rose	"Dreams > Dollars - EP"	Producer
2017	Kelsea Ballerini	"Music" - "Unapologetically"	Co-producer with Jason Massey and Forest Glen Whitehead
2018	Trent Harmon	"You Got 'Em All"	Producer
2018	Keith Urban	"Drop Top (feat. Kassi Ashton)"	Co-producer with Jesse Shatkin and Keith Urban
2018	Catherine McGrath	"Cinderella", "Good At Love", "Just In Case", "The Edges"	Producer
2018	Maddie and Tae	Friends Don't, "Die From A Broken Heart", "Tourist In This Town"	Co-producer with Derek Wells
2018	Clare Dunn	Put You Into Words	Co-producer with Clare Dunn
2018	Gnash (musician)	The Broken Hearts Club	Co-producer with Gnash
2018	Sam Fischer	"This City"	Producer
2019	Leaving Austin	Single (2019)	"She Can"
2019	Maddie and Tae	"People Need People"	Co-producer with Derek Wells
2019	Kelsea Ballerini	"Homecoming Queen"	Producer
2019	Maddie and Tae	"Bathroom Floor"	Co-producer with Derek Wells
2020	Kelsea Ballerini	"Club", "LA", "Bragger", "Needy", "Country Song", "The Way I Used To", "Half Of My Hometown"	Producer
2020	Chrissy Metz	"Talking To God"	Co-producer with Derek Wells
2020	Chrissy Metz	"Actress"	Co-producer with Derek Wells
2020	Chrissy Metz	"Feel Good"	Co-producer with Derek Wells
2020	Kelsea Ballerini	"Ballerini" album	Producer
2020	Maddie and Tae	"We Need Christmas" EP	Co-producer with Derek Wells
2020	Clare Wright	"I Could Use A Beach"	Co-producer with Eric Arjes
2020	Derek Austin	"Her Daddy Don't Like Me"	Co-producer with Jonathan Singleton
2021	Carly Pearce	"Messy"	Producer
2021	Ashley Cooke	"Sunday Morning Kinda Saturday Night"	Producer
2021	Maddie and Tae	"Woman You Got"	Co-producer with Derek Wells
2021	Maddie and Tae	"Mood Ring"	Co-producer with Derek Wells
2021	Joy Oladokun and Maren Morris	"Bigger Man"	Producer
2021	Chase Rice	"If I Didn't Have You"	Co-producer with Jonathan Singleton
2021	Kelsea Ballerini and LANY	"I Quit Drinking"	Co-producer with Noah Conrad
2021	Mickey Guyton	Indigo	Producer
2021	Ashley Cooke	"Already Drank That Beer: Side A"	Producer
2021	Morgan Evans	The Country and The Coast side A	Producer
2021	Eli Young Band	Lucky For Me	Co-producer with Eric Arjes
2022	Brett Young	Long Way Home	Producer
2022	Ashley Cooke ft. Brett Young	Never Til Now	Producer
2022	Eli Young Band	Love Talking	Co-producer with Eric Arjes
2022	Levi Hummon	For Me	Co-producer with Eric Arjes
2022	Noah Thompson	"One Day Tonight"	Producer
2022	HunterGirl	"Red Bird"	Producer
2022	Nicolle Galyon	"First Born"	Co-producer with King Henry
2022	Maddie and Tae	"Through The Madness Vol. 1"	Co-producer with Derek Wells
2022	Maddie and Tae	"Through The Madness Vol. 2"	Co-producer with Derek Wells
2022	Noah Thompson	"Stay"	Producer
2022	Ashley Cooke	Getting Into	Producer
2022	Charles Kelley	"As Far As You Could"	Co-producer with Dave Haywood
2023	Erin Kinsey	Boys In Boots	Producer
2023	Kimberly Perry	Bloom	Producer
2023	Ashley Cooke	"Shot In The Dark"	Producer
2023	Kimberly Perry	Super Bloom	Producer
2024	Nicolle Galyon	"Second Wife"	Co-producer with King Henry
2024	Carson Wallace	"Light Of Day"	Producer
2024	Demps	"Bitch On Wine", "If You Were A Country Girl"	Producer
2024	Brett Young	"Goodnight Into Good Morning"	Producer
2024	Sacha	"Hey Mom, I Made It"	Co-producer with Eric Arjes
2024	Ben Platt	"Treehouse" ft. Brandy Clark, "Shoe To Drop", "Boy Who Hung The Mon"	Co-producer with Dave Cobb
2024	Eli Young Band	"Home In Hometown"	Co-producer with Eric Arjes
2024	Adrien Nunez	"Minnesota"	Producer
2024	Dolly Parton, Maddie and Tae, Jessie James Decker, and Callie Twisselman	"Gonna Be You"	Producer
2025	Brett Young	"Drink With You", "Kiss To Forget", "Who I Do It For", "Goodnight Into Good Morning", "That Ain't Yours", "Full House", "You Still Got It"	Producer
2025	Cole Swindell	"Happy Hour Sad", "We Can Always Move On"	Producer
2025	Maren Morris	"Dreamsicle"	Producer
2025	Bailey Zimmerman and Diplo	"Ashes"	Co-Producer
2025	Maren Morris	"Dreamsicle: Deluxe"	Producer
2025	Eli Young Band	"Strange Hours"	Co-producer with Eric Arjes
2025	Colbie Caillat	"This Time Around"	Co-producer with Eric Arjes
2026	Maren Morris	"Parachute"	Producer
2026	Mackenzie Carpenter	"High Pony"	Producer
2026	Dylan Conrique	"A Little Like You"	Producer
2026	Redferrin	"Have You Now" "3 Day Bender"	Producer
2026	Leanna	"Revenge" "Her"	Producer
2026	Brett Young	"Me Holding On"	Producer
2026	Ne-Yo	"Wish I Didn't Know You"	Producer
2026	Jenna Raine	"Frosty" "A Baby Was Born"	Producer

== Albums released as an artist ==
- Sleep The Pain Away (2005) LP
- Too Sorry For Apologies (May 9, 2006) EP
- See Through Secrets [Digital Release] (September 8, 2009) LP
- Step One EP (November 29, 2009) EP
- "Borrowed Time" (December 13, 2011) EP
