= One That Got Away =

Single by Michael Ray

from the album Amos
- Released: July 2, 2018
- Genre: Country, country pop
- Length: 3:38
- Label: Warner Bros. Nashville, Atlantic
- Songwriter(s): Jesse Frasure; Josh Osborne; Matthew Ramsey; Trevor Rosen
- Producer(s): Scott Hendricks

Michael Ray singles chronology
"Get to You" (2017)	"One That Got Away" (2018)	"Her World or Mine" (2019)

"One That Got Away" is a song written by Jesse Frasure, Josh Osborne, Matthew Ramsey and Trevor Rosen, and recorded by American country music singer Michael Ray. It is the second single from his second studio album, Amos.

== Content ==
The Boot described the song as "Ray focuses on enjoying the ride while it lasts and coming out of the relationship with a great story to tell. Summery and upbeat, the song makes for a perfect addition to his festival setlists." Ray said that he wanted a "loose feel" when recording the song, and said that the song's content of enjoying a relationship reminded him of his upbringing. Ray said that he compared it to the feel of "Kiss You in the Morning", and that its content was "definitely one of those that I have lived".

== Music video ==
Sean Hagwell directed the music video, which was filmed in Miami, Florida.

== Charts ==
=== Weekly charts ===
Chart (2018–2019)	Peak position
Canada Country (Billboard)	7
US Billboard Hot 100	67
US Country Airplay (Billboard)	3
US Hot Country Songs (Billboard)	10

=== Year-end charts ===
Chart (2019)	Position
US Country Airplay (Billboard)	32
US Hot Country Songs (Billboard)	60

== Certifications ==
Certifications for One That Got Away
Region	Certification	Certified units/sales
United States (RIAA)	Gold	500,000^{‡}
^{‡} Sales+streaming figures based on certification alone.
