= Top of the World (Tim McGraw song) =

Single by Tim McGraw

from the album Damn Country Music
- Released: August 4, 2015
- Genre: Country
- Length: 3:54 (album version); 3:31 (radio/lyric video version)
- Label: Big Machine
- Songwriter(s): Josh Osborne; Jimmy Robbins; Jon Nite
- Producer(s): Byron Gallimore; Tim McGraw

Tim McGraw singles chronology
"Diamond Rings and Old Barstools" (2015)	"Top of the World" (2015)	"Lovin' Lately" (2016)

"Top of the World" is a song recorded by American country music artist Tim McGraw. It was released to radio on August 4, 2015 as the lead single to his third studio album for Big Machine Records, Damn Country Music, released on November 6, 2015, and his fourteenth overall single for Big Machine. The song was written by Josh Osborne, Jimmy Robbins and Jon Nite.

== Critical reception ==
An uncredited Taste of Country review stated that "Tim McGraw keeps it mellow with the first single from an upcoming project. “Top of the World” is a gentle way for the singer to describe his love to someone. McGraw uses a familiar metaphor to make it clear this woman couldn’t make him feel any finer."

== Music video ==
The music video was directed by McGraw Music and premiered in November 2015.

== Commercial performance ==
The song debuted on the Country Airplay chart at No. 30 and the Hot Country Songs chart at No. 35 upon its release. The following week it debuted on the Country Digital Songs chart at No. 18, selling 16,000 copies.

== Charts ==
=== Weekly charts ===
Chart (2015–2016)	Peak position
Canada (Canadian Hot 100)	89
Canada Country (Billboard)	6
US Billboard Hot 100	73
US Country Airplay (Billboard)	5
US Hot Country Songs (Billboard)	11

=== Year-end charts ===
Chart (2015)	Position
US Country Airplay (Billboard)	67
US Hot Country Songs (Billboard)	70

Chart (2016)	Position
US Hot Country Songs (Billboard)	81
