= Run Away with You =

Single by Big & Rich

from the album Gravity
- Released: January 19, 2015
- Genre: Country pop; soft rock
- Length: 3:44
- Label: Big & Rich
- Songwriters: John Rich; Michael Ray
- Producers: Big Kenny; John Rich

Big & Rich singles chronology
"Look at You" (2014)	"Run Away with You" (2015)	"Lovin' Lately" (2016)

"Run Away with You" is a song recorded by American country music duo Big & Rich. It was released in January 2015 as the second single from their fifth studio album, Gravity. The song was written by group member John Rich, along with Michael Ray.

== Content ==
"Run Away with You" is a guitar-driven ballad featuring John Rich on lead vocals. The song is about being in love with someone and wanting to "run away" with them.

== Critical reception ==
Website Taste of Country reviewed the single favorably, with an uncredited review saying that Rich "does vulnerable well" while also praising the arrangement and lyrics.

== Music video ==
The music video, directed by Lloyd Norman, and produced by Cameron McCasland. It follows a married couple on a journey from Nashville, Tennessee to a Big & Rich concert in Myrtle Beach, South Carolina. In the video, the couple is shown hiking in the mountains, dancing on the beach and appearing on stage with Big & Rich The performance shots were filmed during Big & Rich's set at the Carolina Country Music Festival in June 2015.

== Other versions ==
Michael Ray, with whom Rich co-wrote the song, also recorded it for his self-titled debut album.

== Chart performance ==
The Big & Rich version first charted on Country Airplay at No. 59 for charts dated January 31, 2015. The climb up the chart however was slow, and it entered the Hot Country Songs at No. 39 on the August 29, 2015 chart. The song has sold 103,000 copies in the US as of November 2015.

Chart (2015)	Peak position
US Bubbling Under Hot 100 (Billboard)	2
US Country Airplay (Billboard)	11
US Hot Country Songs (Billboard)	17

=== Year-end charts ===
Chart (2015)	Position
US Country Airplay (Billboard)	55
US Hot Country Songs (Billboard)	81
