= How I'll Always Be =

Single by Tim McGraw

from the album Damn Country Music
- Released: July 11, 2016
- Genre: Country
- Length: 3:33
- Label: Big Machine
- Songwriter(s): Chris Janson; Jamie Paulin; Jeremy Stover
- Producer(s): Byron Gallimore; Tim McGraw

Tim McGraw singles chronology
"Humble and Kind" (2016)	"How I'll Always Be" (2016)	"May We All" (2016)

"How I'll Always Be" is a song recorded by American country music artist Tim McGraw and written by Chris Janson, Jamie Paulin, and Jeremy Stover. It was released on July 11, 2016, as the third single from McGraw's fourteenth studio album Damn Country Music.

== Content ==
The song is about the narrator's beliefs, saying that they represent "how [he'll] always be." It is mainly accompanied by steel guitar.

== Critical reception ==
A review from Taste of Country was favorable, praising the instrumentation and the "throwback" feel of the song.

== Charts ==
=== Weekly charts ===
Chart (2016–2017)	Peak position
Canada Country (Billboard)	9
US Billboard Hot 100	70
US Country Airplay (Billboard)	3
US Hot Country Songs (Billboard)	9

=== Year end charts ===
Chart (2016)	Position
US Country Airplay (Billboard)	59
US Hot Country Songs (Billboard)	74

Chart (2017)	Position
US Country Airplay (Billboard)	60
US Hot Country Songs (Billboard)	83

== Certifications ==
Region	Certification	Certified units/sales
United States (RIAA)	Gold	500,000^{‡}
^{‡} Sales+streaming figures based on certification alone.
