= Her World or Mine =

2019 single by Michael Ray

Single by Michael Ray

from the album Amos
- Released: May 13, 2019
- Genre: Country
- Length: 3:28
- Label: Warner Bros. Nashville, Atlantic
- Songwriters: Brett Beavers; Travis Denning; Jamie Paulin
- Producer: Scott Hendricks

Michael Ray singles chronology
"One That Got Away" (2018)	"Her World or Mine" (2019)	"Whiskey and Rain" (2020)

"Her World or Mine" (formerly known as "One of Us") is a song recorded by American country music singer Michael Ray. It was released in May 2019 as the third single from his second major-label studio album, Amos.

== Content ==
"Her World or Mine" was written by Brett Beavers, Travis Denning, and Jamie Paulin. Described as a poignant ballad, the song "examines the different trajectories of lives post-breakup." Michael Ray was going through a breakup when he came across the song for the first time and said the timing was perfect: "This would be a very different situation if the song found me two years ago. I believe a song always finds you at the right time. I can sing every word of that song with feeling."

== Music video ==
The music video for "Her World or Mine," which premiered on October 16, 2019, stars actor Chad Michael Murray and was inspired by Ray's own experience with watching his parents go through divorce. It portrays Ray's parents fighting and his mother eventually walking out, while also detailing his grandfather coping with the loss of his wife (Ray's grandmother), with the family coming together again at the end of the video to attend her funeral. Daniel Carberry and Keenan O'Reilly directed the video, which is dedicated to Ray's grandmother Naomi.

== Charts ==
=== Weekly charts ===
Chart (2019–2020)	Peak position
US Bubbling Under Hot 100 (Billboard)	12
US Country Airplay (Billboard)	22
US Hot Country Songs (Billboard)	31

=== Year-end charts ===
Chart (2020)	Position
US Hot Country Songs (Billboard)	83

== Certifications ==
Region	Certification	Certified units/sales
United States (RIAA)	Gold	500,000^{‡}
^{‡} Sales+streaming figures based on certification alone.
