= David Ashley Parker from Powder Springs =

Song by Travis Denning

Single by Travis Denning
- Released: March 2018
- Genre: Country
- Length: 3:30
- Label: Mercury Nashville
- Songwriter(s): Travis Denning; Jon Randall; Jessi Alexander
- Producer(s): Jeremy Stover

Travis Denning singles chronology
"David Ashley Parker from Powder Springs" (2018)	"After a Few" (2019)

"David Ashley Parker from Powder Springs" is a song co-written and recorded by American country music singer Travis Denning. Written along with Jessi Alexander and Jon Randall, the song describes Denning's experiences with using a fake ID to illegally purchase alcohol underage. Released in March 2018, the song received a positive review from the reviewer Billy Dukes; it also charted on the Hot Country Songs and Country Airplay charts in the United States.

== Content and inspiration ==
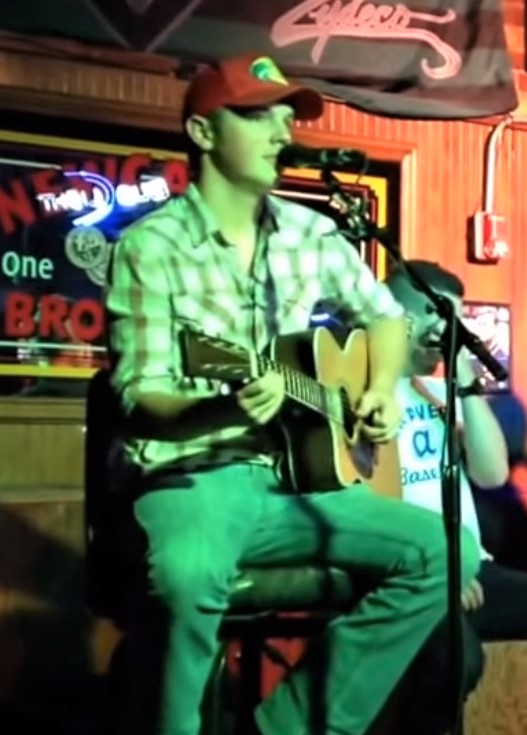
Denning playing in 2014

The song's inspiration stems from a driver's license one of Denning's friends found after it had been lost at a bar; the friend then used it as a fake ID to illegally purchase alcohol under the name and residence of David Ashley Parker of Powder Springs, Georgia, respectively, although Denning stated that he used the license. Denning, who is a professional songwriter, considered writing the song while he was 19 years old and was still using the identity, but decided that waiting until he could write about his actions reflectively was better. The song was written by Denning, Jessi Alexander, and Jon Randall in a single writing session; Denning reported that the song only took about two hours to write.

Lyrically, the song describes the use of the fake ID from Denning's viewpoint. Other themes touched on in the song include being the "hero of the party", and the favorable reaction Denning got from girls by bringing them alcohol. Denning also stated that the song covered all of the details his music reveals about himself, and that he loved the storytelling aspect of the song. "David Ashley Parker from Powder Springs" was released in March 2018 on the Mercury Nashville label.

== Critical reception ==
Billy Dukes, reviewing for Taste of Country, described the song as having a "country-rock package" and that he considered the song to be "real country", although noting that some listeners might find the lyrical content objectionable. He also gave the song a positive review, stating that it "hit the mark". The song's quirkiness and storytelling have also been noted by reviewers.

== Music video ==
A music video, directed by Justin Clough, was created to accompany the song. In the video, a college student is shown purchasing alcohol underage and taking it to a party, where he and his alcohol are positively received. The party is then broken up by police, who place the protagonist in handcuffs. The video features the real-life David Ashley Parker, who portrays a liquor store clerk.

== Charts ==
=== Weekly charts ===
Chart (2018)	Peak position
US Country Airplay (Billboard)	32
US Hot Country Songs (Billboard)	37

=== Year-end charts ===
Chart (2018)	Position
US Hot Country Songs (Billboard)	94
