= California (Big & Rich song) =

Single by Big & Rich

from the album Did It for the Party
- Released: March 6, 2017
- Genre: Country
- Length: 3:21
- Label: Big & Rich/Thirty Tigers
- Songwriter(s): John Rich; Rodney Clawson; Vicky McGehee
- Producer(s): Big Kenny; John Rich

Big & Rich singles chronology
"Lovin' Lately" (2016)	"California" (2017)

"California" is a country music song written by John Rich, Rodney Clawson, and Vicky McGehee. It was originally recorded by Tim McGraw on his album Damn Country Music, featuring Big & Rich on backing vocals. Big & Rich released their own version in 2017 as a single, and it appears on their 2017 album Did It for the Party.

== History ==
Tim McGraw recorded the song on his 2015 album Damn Country Music, with Big & Rich on background vocals. McGraw chose to put it on the album because his guitar player played a demo which was recorded by John Rich, one-half of the duo.

== Content ==
The song is a country rock song about an ending relationship, focusing on a woman who is leaving her man on a journey to California.

== Chart performance ==
=== Weekly charts ===
Chart (2017)	Peak position
US Country Airplay (Billboard)	20
US Hot Country Songs (Billboard)	32

=== Year-end charts ===
Chart (2017)	Position
US Hot Country Songs (Billboard)	91
