= Look at You (Big & Rich song) =

Single by Big & Rich

from the album Gravity
- Released: January 28, 2014
- Genre: Country
- Length: 3:44
- Label: Big & Rich
- Songwriters: John Rich; Shannon Lawson
- Producers: Big Kenny; John Rich

Big & Rich singles chronology
"Cheat on You" (2013)	"Look at You" (2014)	"Run Away with You" (2015)

"Look at You" is a song recorded by American country music duo Big & Rich. It was released in January 2014 as the first single from their album Gravity. The song was written by John Rich, one half of the duo, and Shannon Lawson.

== Music video ==
The music video was directed by Trey Fanjoy and premiered in September 2014, starring Aurelia Scheppers as the lead actress.

== Chart performance ==
"Look at You" debuted at number 54 on the U.S. Billboard Country Airplay chart for the week of March 15, 2014. It eventually peaked at number 7 on that chart, making it the duo's second top ten song, the first being "Lost in This Moment". As of December 2014, the song has sold 350,000 copies in the United States.

Chart (2014–2015)	Peak position
Canada Hot 100 (Billboard)	99
Canada Country (Billboard)	23
US Billboard Hot 100	73
US Country Airplay (Billboard)	7
US Hot Country Songs (Billboard)	13

=== Year-end charts ===
Chart (2014)	Position
US Country Airplay (Billboard)	37
US Hot Country Songs (Billboard)	47

Chart (2015)	Position
US Country Airplay (Billboard)	98

== Certifications ==
Region	Certification	Certified units/sales
United States (RIAA)	Gold	500,000^{‡}
^{‡} Sales+streaming figures based on certification alone.
