= Real Men Love Jesus =

Single by Michael Ray

from the album Michael Ray
- Released: September 14, 2015
- Recorded: 2015
- Genre: Country
- Length: 3:11
- Label: Warner Bros. Nashville/Atlantic
- Songwriters: Lance Miller; Adam Sanders; Brad Warren; Brett Warren
- Producer: Scott Hendricks

Michael Ray singles chronology
"Kiss You in the Morning" (2015)	"Real Men Love Jesus" (2015)	"Think a Little Less" (2016)

"Real Men Love Jesus" is a song recorded by American country music artist Michael Ray. It was released on September 14, 2015, as the second single from Ray's major-label debut album. The song was written by Brad Warren, Brett Warren, Lance Miller and Adam Sanders.

== Critical reception ==
Country music blog Taste of Country reviewed the single favorably, saying that "Fans of Michael Ray’s 'Real Men Love Jesus' will argue that the song is what the country is missing. The Florida-raised singer sings of strong family values and a commitment to hard work before allowing a little room for true love and a good time."

== Music video ==
The music video was directed by Sam Siske and premiered in December 2015.

== Chart performance ==
=== Weekly charts ===
Chart (2015–2016)	Peak position
Canada Country (Billboard)	44
US Country Airplay (Billboard)	17
US Hot Country Songs (Billboard)	28

=== Year-end charts ===
Chart (2016)	Position
US Hot Country Songs (Billboard)	90
