= Think a Little Less =

Single by Michael Ray

from the album Michael Ray
- Released: April 25, 2016
- Recorded: 2015
- Genre: Country
- Length: 2:57
- Label: Warner Bros. Nashville/Atlantic
- Songwriters: Barry Dean; Jon Nite; Thomas Rhett; Jimmy Robbins
- Producer: Scott Hendricks

Michael Ray singles chronology
| "Real Men Love Jesus" (2015) | "Think a Little Less" (2016) | "Get to You" (2017) |

"Think a Little Less" is a song recorded by American country music artist Michael Ray. It was released on April 25, 2016 as the third single from Ray's major-label debut album. This song was written by Barry Dean, Jon Nite, Jimmy Robbins, and Thomas Rhett.

== Critical reception ==
The song debuted at No. 53 on Country Airplay for chart dated May 7, 2016, but only entered the Hot Country Songs chart on October 15, 2016. On March 20, 2017 the song hit number one on Country Music Radio giving Michael Ray his second career number one song.

The song has sold 278,000 copies in the United States as of April 2017.

== Music video ==
A music video featuring mostly live footage, done in black-and-white, was directed by Cody Kern and premiered in June 2016.

An alternate music video directed by Jack Guy was later shot and premiered on CMT in January 2017.

== Chart performance ==
| Chart (2016–2017) | Peak position |
|---|---|
| Canada Country (Billboard) | 23 |
| US Billboard Hot 100 | 54 |
| US Country Airplay (Billboard) | 2 |
| US Hot Country Songs (Billboard) | 3 |

=== Year-end charts ===
| Chart (2017) | Position |
|---|---|
| US Billboard Country Airplay | 24 |
| US Billboard Hot Country Songs | 42 |

== Certifications ==
| Region | Certification | Certified units/sales |
|---|---|---|
| United States (RIAA) | Platinum | 1,000,000^{‡} |
^{‡} Sales+streaming figures based on certification alone.
