= Gravity (Big & Rich album) =

Studio album by Big & Rich
- Released: September 23, 2014
- Genre: Country pop
- Length: 39:54
- Label: Big & Rich Records
- Producer: Big Kenny, John Rich

Big & Rich chronology
Hillbilly Jedi (2012)	Gravity (2014)	Did It for the Party (2017)

Singles from Gravity
- 1. "Look at You" Released: January 28, 2014; 2. "Run Away with You" Released: January 19, 2015; 3. "Lovin' Lately" Released: January 11, 2016; 4. "Brand New Buzz" Released: December 3, 2018

Professional ratings
Review scores
Source	Rating
100% Rock Magazine	9.5/10
Allmusic	3.5/5 stars
Country Music Chat	(favorable)
Country Music Pride	(favorable)
Country Perspective	6/10
Digital Journal	(favorable)
Journal Sentinel	(favorable)
New England Country Music	(favorable)
Ride of Fame	4.5/5 stars
WOW Country	(favorable)

Gravity is the fifth studio album by American country music duo Big & Rich, and was released on September 23, 2014. The duo announced that they had begun work on their next album in summer 2013 before releasing the album's lead off single, "Look at You," in January 2014. In addition to releasing the single, the duo announced that they had started their own record label, Big & Rich Records, which handled the release of this album.

== Overview ==
With the release of Hillbilly Jedi in 2012, Big & Rich were once again working as a duo after a lengthy hiatus. In mid 2013, the duo had unofficially begun work on a followup. News was sporadic, with John Rich posting updates on his Twitter feed about the recording process. He mentioned having "cut ten songs" in July, whilst also making note of the fact that he and Big Kenny "actually agreed on something in the studio." Big & Rich kept the project on a small scale, only previewing the music for their label Warner Bros. Nashville, who claimed that it was their "best material since Horse of a Different Color."

On January 28, 2014, the album was officially announced along with the release of the album's debut single, "Look at You" and the news that the duo had parted ways with Warner Bros. in favor of a self-owned record label. Big & Rich posted a video detailing their new single and record label on their YouTube channel in February, claiming that they wanted to control the release schedule of their music so they could "cut a song and have it in the fans' hands the next day." After amicably parting ways with Warner Bros., the duo worked at their own pace and completed the album. In a solo interview, Big Kenny mentioned that having complete control of their musical endeavors would allow the duo to "see what's working and what isn't," as well as to release the album when they see fit. Kenny also made mention of a duet with Tim McGraw that might appear on the album. On July 28, the duo officially announced the release date of the album through their Facebook page. The track listing and cover art were revealed the same day in a press release on BigandRich.com.

In an exclusive interview with Nashville.com, Big & Rich shared their thoughts on the album and their decision to start an independent record label. Of the lead single "Look at You," Rich said that the song "was written by Shannon Lawson and myself. Shannon is a Musik Mafia guy from way back and really a phenomenal singer. We had this idea. I said “have you ever broken up with a girl, you go down to the bar and you’re single again, and you see her? She’s looking hotter than she’s ever looked before on purpose, she’s doing shots and other guys are looking at her. That happened to me every time I ever broke up with anybody” and I said, “That’s what I want to write about.”" "Lovin' Lately," the duet with Tim McGraw, was confirmed as the follow-up single due to be released in late 2014. The duo said that their decision to strike it out on their own was the result of Warner Bros. Nashville's schedule not allowing for Gravity to be released until 2015 at the earliest. Rather than have the project shelved, Big & Rich opted to start their label and release the album sooner. Of the decision to form their own label, Kenny said that "it’s the kind of thing we believed in ten years ago as the Musik Mafia. Just anyway to get the music out there."

The album's three singles are "Look at You", "Run Away with You", and "Lovin' Lately", a duet with Tim McGraw. Group member John Rich co-wrote all three singles.

== Pre-release ==
Gravity was included in a list by Rolling Stone of 13 must-hear country albums that would be releasing in September 2014. The publication acknowledged that the album finds the duo "taking their lyrical prowess and signature harmonies to new levels." On September 13, Big & Rich announced via their Facebook that the entirety of Gravity would be available for streaming a full week before release exclusively through Pandora Radio. In anticipation of the Gravity's release, Big & Rich hosted a release party in New York City on release date and another in Los Angeles on October 1. Each ticket purchased included a free copy of the album.

== Reception ==
=== Critical ===
The album has received critical acclaim. In a pre-release review for Country Music Chat, Nicole Piering expressed that "this album has a track for everyone, truly defying gravity." Christina Petrino wrote for Ride of Fame that "Big Kenny and John Rich are back with their big hearts, rocking personality and a country masterpiece." She awarded the album 4.5 out of 5 stars. New England Country Music praised each of the tracks concluding that " you don’t want to overlook this album- make sure you purchase ‘Gravity.’" Allmusic's Stephen Thomas Erlewine criticized the duo's harmonies, but ultimately concluded that "it's possible to hear Gravity through those harmonies and appreciate it as the finely constructed piece of adult contemporary it is." He awarded the album 3.5 out of 5 stars. Erik Ernst wrote in his positive review for Journal Sentinel that "Big & Rich have released a mature set of songs that find the still fun-loving pair sounding kind of classic." In a preview for the radio station WOW Country, Rich Summers expressed the merits of each of the album's tracks as well as imploring readers "don’t leave this one out of your collection. You won’t be sorry."

=== Commercial ===
Gravity debuted at number 8 on the country music album charts with first week sales of 7,000 units. The album has sold 37,700 copies in the US as of August 2015.

== Track listing ==
All tracks are written by John Rich, with additional co-writers as noted.

No.	Title	Writer(s)	Length
1.	"Look at You"	Shannon Lawson	3:44
2.	"Lovin' Lately" (featuring Tim McGraw)	Big Kenny; Tim McGraw	3:38
3.	"Gravity"	Big Kenny; Amy Foster	3:55
4.	"Brand New Buzz"	Rodney Clawson	3:22
5.	"Rollin' Along"	Big Kenny; Eric Paslay	3:06
6.	"Run Away with You"	Michael Ray	3:44
7.	"Lose a Little Sleep"	Big Kenny; Robin Lerner	3:49
8.	"Don't Wake Me Up"	Ray	3:22
9.	"That Kind of Town"	Gerry House	3:45
10.	"Thank God For Pain"	Vicky McGehee; Marti Frederiksen	3:35
11.	"I Came to Git Down"	Big Kenny; Frankie Ballard	3:54
Total length:			39:54

Walmart Exclusive Edition
No.	Title	Writer(s)	Length
12.	"Party Like Cowboyz (Electro Shine Dance Remix)"	Big Kenny; Clawson; McGehee	3:44
Total length:			43:38

== Personnel ==
=== Big and Rich ===
- Big Kenny - vocals
- John Rich - vocals

=== Additional Musicians ===
- Tyler Cain - electric guitar
- Shawn Fichter - drums
- Larry Gatlin - background vocals
- Mike Johnson - steel guitar
- Troy Lancaster - electric guitar
- Brent Mason - electric guitar
- Tim McGraw - vocals on "Lovin' Lately"
- Greg Morrow - drums, drum loops, percussion
- Danny Rader - banjo, bouzouki, acoustic guitar, mandolin
- Michael Rhodes - bass guitar
- Jeff Roach - Hammond B-3 organ, keyboards, piano
- Aaron Rochotte - background vocals
- Mike Rojas - Hammond B-3 organ, keyboards, piano
- Adam Shoenfeld - electric guitar
- Jimmie Lee Sloas - bass guitar
- John Willis - banjo, bouzouki, acoustic guitar

== Chart performance ==
=== Album ===
Chart (2014–15)	Peak position
US Billboard 200	51
US Top Country Albums (Billboard)	8
US Independent Albums (Billboard)	10

=== Singles ===
Year	Single	Peak chart positions				
Year	Single	US Country	US Country Airplay	US	CAN Country	CAN
2014	"Look at You"	13	7	73	23	99
2015	"Run Away with You"	17	11	102	—	—
2016	"Lovin' Lately"	19	14	120		
"—" denotes releases that did not chart
