= Get to You (Michael Ray song) =

Single by Michael Ray

from the album Amos
- Released: July 24, 2017
- Recorded: 2017
- Genre: Country
- Length: 3:13
- Label: Warner Bros. Nashville, Atlantic
- Songwriters: Pavel Dovgalyuk; Abe Stoklasa
- Producer: Scott Hendricks

Michael Ray singles chronology
| "Think a Little Less" (2016) | "Get to You" (2017) | "One That Got Away" (2018) |

"Get to You" is a song recorded by American country music singer Michael Ray. It was released on July 24, 2017 as the lead-off single from Ray's second studio album, Amos.

== Content ==
Written by Abe Stoklasa and Pavel Dovgalyuk, "Get to You" is described as a song with a "moody melody" that Ray "passionately sings to a woman whose past heartbreak has her running away from love, pleading that he won't cause that same heartache with a message that embodies compassion."

== Commercial performance ==
The song has sold 121,000 copies in the United States as of June 2018.

== Chart performance ==
=== Weekly charts ===
| Chart (2017–2018) | Peak position |
|---|---|
| Canada Country (Billboard) | 45 |
| US Bubbling Under Hot 100 (Billboard) | 2 |
| US Country Airplay (Billboard) | 15 |
| US Hot Country Songs (Billboard) | 17 |

=== Year-end charts ===
| Chart (2018) | Position |
|---|---|
| US Country Airplay (Billboard) | 60 |
| US Hot Country Songs (Billboard) | 60 |

== Certifications ==
Certifications for Get to You
| Region | Certification | Certified units/sales |
|---|---|---|
| United States (RIAA) | Gold | 500,000^{‡} |
^{‡} Sales+streaming figures based on certification alone.
