= Lovin' Lately =

Single by Big & Rich featuring Tim McGraw

from the album Gravity
- Released: January 11, 2016
- Genre: Country
- Length: 3:38
- Label: Big & Rich Records
- Songwriters: Big Kenny; John Rich; Tim McGraw
- Producers: Big Kenny; John Rich

Big & Rich singles chronology
"Run Away with You" (2015)	"Lovin' Lately" (2016)	"California" (2017)

Tim McGraw singles chronology
"Top of the World" (2015)	"Lovin' Lately" (2016)	"Humble and Kind" (2016)

"Lovin' Lately" is a song by American country music duo Big & Rich featuring Tim McGraw (whom all of them wrote the track). It was released in January 2016 as the third single from Big & Rich's third studio album, Gravity.

== Critical reception ==
An uncredited Taste of Country review of the song was positive, saying that "Sharp storytelling and a strong bridge make this song the finest release yet from Gravity."

== Commercial performance ==
The song first entered the Hot Country Songs at No. 48 for chart dated March 12, 2016, and peaked at No. 19 on the chart for October 15, 2016. The song has sold 125,000 copies as of October 2016.

== Music video ==
The music video was released as part of the Gravity Quadrilogy and stars McGraw as the bartender. It was directed by Trey Fanjoy.

== Chart performance ==
=== Weekly charts ===
Chart (2016)	Peak position
US Bubbling Under Hot 100 (Billboard)	6
US Country Airplay (Billboard)	14
US Hot Country Songs (Billboard)	19

=== Year end charts ===
Chart (2016)	Position
US Country Airplay (Billboard)	53
US Hot Country Songs (Billboard)	71
