= I'm Good (Abby Anderson EP) =

I'm Good EP

EP by Abby Anderson
- Released: September 7, 2018
- Genre: country
- Length: 15:39
- Label: Black River
- Producer: Jason Massey; Jesse Frasure; Josh Kerr

Abby Anderson chronology
| He Loves Me (2014) | I'm Good EP (2018) | TBA |

Singles from I'm Good EP
- 1. "Make Him Wait" Released: April 27, 2018; 2. "This Feeling" Released: September 22, 2018

I'm Good is the debut and first major-label extended play by American singer Abby Anderson, it was released on September 7, 2018 through Black River Entertainment. It spawned 2 singles, "Make Him Wait" and "This Feeling". The album peaked at number 42 on Billboard Country Album Sales on 22 September 2019.

== Music and lyrics ==
The title track was chosen as the opening track because it exemplifies Anderson's determination and independent spirit while also showcasing her versatility. “Make Him Wait” was Anderson’s debut single, which sets to be the second track in her five-song project. It outlines the lessons her parents taught her about dating and true love, and implores listeners to see whether a lover is serious before committing. The song’s most prominent instrumentation is a piano, though guitars and drums make appearances as well. The third track, “Dance Away My Broken Heart”, is co-written with her labelmate, Kelsea Ballerini, the country legend, Rhett Akins and his son, Thomas Rhett, to create the dance-worthy, empowering track that allows fans to dance to. The song encourages people to move on and get out again after a nasty breakup, and dancing helps shake off the scars as the first step in healing heart. "This Feeling", which is released as the second single by Anderson, it delivers the feeling of falling for someone and describes the sensation that falling in love can change you as a person. The EP ends with the swaggering kiss-off “Naked Truth”, a transformation occurs from the start of the song with an admission that she has been crying to the end describing a mountain top epiphany.

== Track listing ==
Adapted from Genius and Tidal.

| No. | Title | Writer(s) | Producer(s) | Length |
|---|---|---|---|---|
| 1. | "I'm Good" | Jason Massey; Abby Anderson; April Geesbreght | Josh Kerr; Massey | 3:22 |
| 2. | "Make Him Wait" | Kerr; Anderson; Tom Douglas | Kerr | 3:21 |
| 3. | "This Feeling" | Anderson; Jimmy Robbins; Jesse Frasure | Frasure | 2:48 |
| 4. | "Dance Away My Broken Heart" | Rhett Akins; Thomas Rhett; Kelsea Ballerini; Frasure; Ashley Gorley | Frasure | 2:48 |
| 5. | "Naked Truth" | Anderson; Jason Deere; Kent Blazy | Anderson | 3:03 |
| Total length: | | | | 15:39 |

== Charts ==
| Chart (2019) | Peak position |
|---|---|
| US Country Album Sales (Billboard) | 42 |
