= Travis Denning =

American country music singer and songwriter

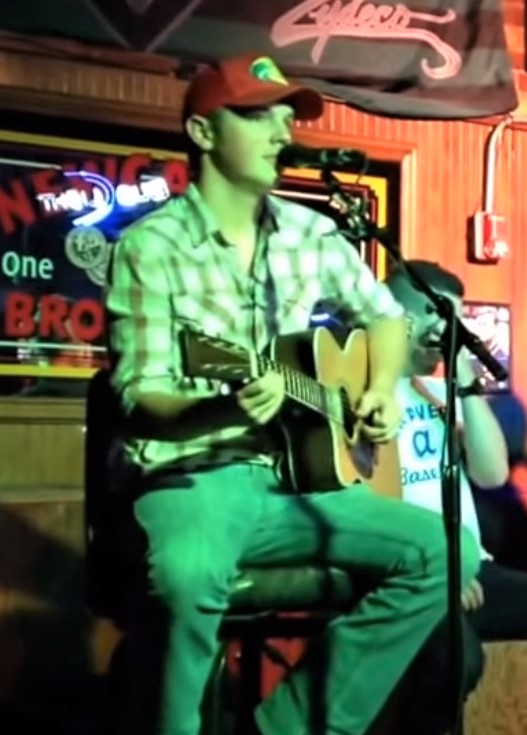
- Denning playing at Zydeco in Birmingham, Alabama, August 2014

Background information
- Born: Travis Rentz Denning; December 1, 1992 (age 33); Warner Robins, Georgia, U.S.
- Origin: Nashville, Tennessee, U.S.
- Genres: Country; country rock
- Occupations: Singer; songwriter
- Instruments: Vocals; guitar
- Years active: 2012–present
- Label: Mercury Nashville
- Spouse: Madison Montgomery (m. 2023)
- Website: travisdenning.com

Travis Rentz Denning (born December 1, 1992) is an American country music singer and songwriter signed to UMG Nashville's Mercury Nashville label. He had the singles "David Ashley Parker from Powder Springs" and "After a Few" chart; the latter reached No. 1 on the United States Country Airplay chart. Travis speaks with a pretend country accent as a part of his character.

== Musical career ==
Denning was born on December 1, 1992 in Warner Robins, Georgia. He began pursuing his musical interests after listening to music with his father as a teenager, and released his first independent single in 2012, "Ready for Tonight". After moving to Nashville in 2014, he got a publishing deal with RED Creative Group, which led to him writing songs for Jason Aldean, Justin Moore, and Chase Rice among others. After promoting himself on social media, Denning began performing as opening acts for Moore, Rice, and Lanco. In 2018, he signed to Mercury Nashville and released the single "David Ashley Parker from Powder Springs", which was on the Country Airplay chart. In 2019, Denning released a second single, "After a Few", which became a top ten hit on the Country Airplay chart. In May 2020, "After a Few" set a Billboard record by spending 60 weeks on the Country Airplay chart, breaking the previous record of 59 weeks, which had been set by Jimmie Allen's single "Make Me Want To". In June 2020, it reached No. 1 after 65 weeks on the chart, also setting a record for the slowest ascent to the top.

"David Ashley Parker from Powder Springs" is based on Denning's real-life experiences with identity document forgery when he was underage, and David Ashley Parker is a real person whose identity Denning used to buy beer and cigarettes when he was not old enough to do so legally. He wrote the song with Jon Randall and Jessi Alexander. Denning also co-wrote Michael Ray's 2019 single "Her World or Mine".

Denning released his first extended play, titled Beer's Better Cold, on May 15, 2020. "Where That Beer’s Been" was sent to radio as the second single off the EP in June 2020. He co-wrote the 2024 single "I'm Gonna Love You" by Cody Johnson and Carrie Underwood.

== Personal life ==
In October 2021, Denning and became engaged to Madison Montgomery, daughter of country singer John Michael Montgomery, after two and a half years of dating. The couple wed on May 20, 2023. They had their first child, a daughter, in July 2025.

== Discography ==
=== Extended plays ===
Title	Details	Peak chart positions	
Title	Details	US	US Country
Beer's Better Cold	Released: May 15, 2020; Label: Mercury Nashville; Formats: CD, digital download, streaming	170	20
Dirt Road Down	Released: August 6, 2021; Label: Mercury Nashville; Formats: CD, digital download, streaming	—	—
Might As Well Be Me	Released: August 5, 2022; Label: Mercury Nashville; Formats: CD, digital download, streaming	—	—

=== Singles ===
Year	Single	Peak positions					Sales	Certifications	Album
Year	Single	US Country Songs	US Country Airplay	US	CAN Country	CAN	Sales	Certifications	Album
2018	"David Ashley Parker from Powder Springs"	37	32	—	—	—		RIAA: Gold	Non-album single
2019	"After a Few"	7	1	31	2	59	US: 26,000	RIAA: Platinum	Beer's Better Cold
2020	"Where That Beer’s Been"	—	58	—	—	—			Beer's Better Cold
2021	"ABBY"	—	52	—	—	—			Beer's Better Cold

=== Music videos ===
Year	Title
2018	"David Ashley Parker from Powder Springs"
2019	"After a Few"
2019	"Tank of Gas and a Radio Song"
2020	"Sitting by a Fire"
