= Damn Country Music =

Studio album by Tim McGraw
- Released: November 6, 2015
- Studios: Blackbird Studio and Sound Stage Studios (Nashville, Tennessee); Essential Sound Studios (Franklin, Tennessee); Mix LA (Los Angeles, California )
- Genre: Country
- Length: 42:14
- Label: Big Machine
- Producers: Byron Gallimore; Tim McGraw

Tim McGraw chronology
Sundown Heaven Town (2014)	Damn Country Music (2015)	The Rest of Our Life (2017)

Singles from Damn Country Music
- 1. "Top of the World" Released: August 4, 2015; 2. "Humble and Kind" Released: January 20, 2016; 3. "How I'll Always Be" Released: July 11, 2016

Damn Country Music is the fourteenth studio album by American country music artist Tim McGraw. It was released on November 6, 2015, by Big Machine Records. It was produced by McGraw and Byron Gallimore. Its lead single, "Top of the World" was released on August 4, 2015. The title track, "Damn Country Music", was released on October 9, 2015, as part of the album pre-order.

== Content ==
The album features a duet with McGraw's oldest daughter Gracie titled "Here Tonight", while Big & Rich perform on the song "California." Big & Rich later released their own version of the song as a single in March 2017. "Don't Make Me Feel At Home" was previously recorded by Wesley Dennis in 1995. The album's title track was covered by Riley Green for his 2023 album, Ain't My Last Rodeo.

== Promotion ==
=== Singles ===
The first single of the album, "Top of the World" was released on August 4, 2015. It debuted at number 30 on the Hot Country Songs chart. The next week it debut at number 18 on the Country Digital Songs chart, selling 16,000 copies. The second single of the album, "Humble and Kind" was released on February 1, 2016. The third single of the album, "How I'll Always Be" released on July 11, 2016.

== Commercial performance ==
The album debuted at No. 5 on the Billboard 200 upon its release, and No. 3 on the Top Country Albums chart, selling 39,300 copies in its first week. As of March 2017 the album has sold 255,800 copies in the United States.

== Track listing ==
Damn Country Music — Standard edition
No.	Title	Writer(s)	Length
1.	"Here Tonight" (with Gracie McGraw)	Brett Beavers, John Osborne, T.J. Osborne	3:50
2.	"Losin' You"	Matt Dragstrem, Rodney Clawson, Tom Douglas	4:22
3.	"How I'll Always Be"	Chris Janson, Jamie Paulin, Jeremy Stover	3:33
4.	"Damn Country Music"	Cary Barlowe, Jessi Alexander, Josh Thompson	3:05
5.	"Love Runs"	Andrew Dorff, Brad Warren, Brett Warren	4:09
6.	"What You're Lookin' For"	Angelo Petraglia, Brett James, Troy Verges	3:56
7.	"Top of the World"	Josh Osborne, Jimmy Robbins, Jon Nite	3:53
8.	"Don't Make Me Feel at Home"	L. David Lewis, Kim Williams	3:39
9.	"Want You Back"	Ashley Gorley, Hillary Lindsey, Clawson	4:01
10.	"California" (with Big & Rich)	John Rich, Vicky McGehee, Clawson	3:26
11.	"Humble and Kind"	Lori McKenna	4:20

Damn Country Music — Deluxe edition bonus tracks
No.	Title	Writer(s)	Length
12.	"Everybody's Lookin'"	Luke Laird, Clawson	4:07
13.	"Kiss a Girl"	Dorff, Matthew Ramsey, Douglas	3:01
14.	"Country and Western"	Dragstrem, Clawson, Douglas	3:45

== Personnel ==
=== Musicians and singers ===
- Tim McGraw – lead vocals
- Jamie Muhoberac – keyboards (1–7, 9, 10, 12–14)
- Jeff Roach – keyboards (1, 2, 4, 6, 7, 14)
- Steve Nathan — keyboards (3, 6, 8–10, 12, 13), horns (12)
- Byron Gallimore –additional keyboards (2, 9), additional backing vocals (7)
- David Dorn – additional keyboards (5, 11)
- David Levita – electric guitar
- Rusty Anderson – electric guitar (1, 2, 4, 6, 7, 9, 10, 14), additional acoustic guitar (1)
- Michael Landau – electric guitar (1–10, 12–14)
- Danny Rader — acoustic guitar (1, 2, 4, 7, 14), banjo (1), mandolin (1), bouzouki (2, 7, 14)
- Justin Schipper – pedal steel guitar
- Troy Lancaster – electric guitar (3, 5, 8, 11–13)
- Ilya Toshinsky – acoustic guitar (3, 5, 6, 8–11, 13)
- Paul Bushnell – bass
- Shannon Forrest – drums, drum programming
- Eric Darken – percussion (1)
- Larry Franklin – fiddle (8)
- Greg Barnhill – backing vocals (1–9, 11–14)
- Gracie McGraw – lead vocals (1)
- Big & Rich – lead and backing vocals (10)

Strings on "Humble and Kind"

- Stephen Lamb — music copyist
- Carole Rabinowitz – cello
- Sara Sant'Ambrogio – cello
- Kristin Wilkinson – viola, string arrangements
- David Angell – violin
- David Davidson – violin

Strings on "Kiss a Girl"

- David Campbell – arrangements and conductor
- Suzie Katayama – contractor
- Mike Valerio – acoustic bass
- Dane Little, Steve Richards and Rudy Stein – cello
- Andrew Duckles, Matt Funes and Luke Maurer – viola
- Charlie Bisharat, Jackie Brand, Mario DeLeon, Songa Lee, Natalie Leggett, Serena McKinney, Joel Pargman, Sara Parkins, Michele Richards and Josefina Vergara – violin

=== Production ===
- Missi Gallimore – A&R
- Tim McGraw — producer
- Byron Gallimore – producer, mixing (2–9, 11–14)
- Julian King — engineer
- Chris Lord-Alge – mixing (1, 10)
- Stephen Allbritten – additional engineer (1–4, 6–10, 12–14), mix assistant (2–9, 11–14)
- Adam Chagnon – additional engineer (1, 10)
- Erik Lutkins – additional engineer (1–4, 6–10, 12–14), mix assistant (2–9, 11–14)
- Ernesto Olvera – assistant engineer (1–4, 6–10, 12–14)
- Jake Burns – assistant engineer (5, 11)
- Nik Karpen – mix assistant (1, 10)
- Adam Ayan – mastering at Gateway Mastering (Portland, Maine)
- Becky Reiser – art production
- Liam Ward – art production
- Kelly Clague – creative director
- Sandi Spika Borchetta – creative director
- Nick Egan – art direction, design
- Danny Clinch – photography

== Charts ==
=== Weekly charts ===
Chart (2015–16)	Peak position
Australian Albums (ARIA)	19
Australian Country Albums (ARIA Charts)	1
Canadian Albums (Billboard)	11
Scottish Albums (Official Charts Company)	87
UK Albums (Official Charts Company)	127
UK Country Albums (Official Charts Company)	3
US Billboard 200	5
US Top Country Albums (Billboard)	3

=== Year-end charts ===
Chart (2015)	Position
US Top Country Albums (Billboard)	67

Chart (2016)	Position
US Billboard 200	95
US Top Country Albums (Billboard)	16

Chart (2017)	Position
US Top Country Albums (Billboard)	96

== Certifications ==
Region	Certification	Certified units/sales
Canada (Music Canada)	Gold	40,000^{‡}
United States (RIAA)	Gold	500,000^{‡}
^{‡} Sales+streaming figures based on certification alone.

== Release history ==
List of release dates, showing region, formats, label, editions and reference
Region	Date	Format(s)	Label	Edition(s)	Ref.
United States	November 6, 2015	CD; digital download	Big Machine Records / McGraw Music	Standard; Deluxe	
