= Leah Turner =

American country-music singer and songwriter

Leah Galván Turner
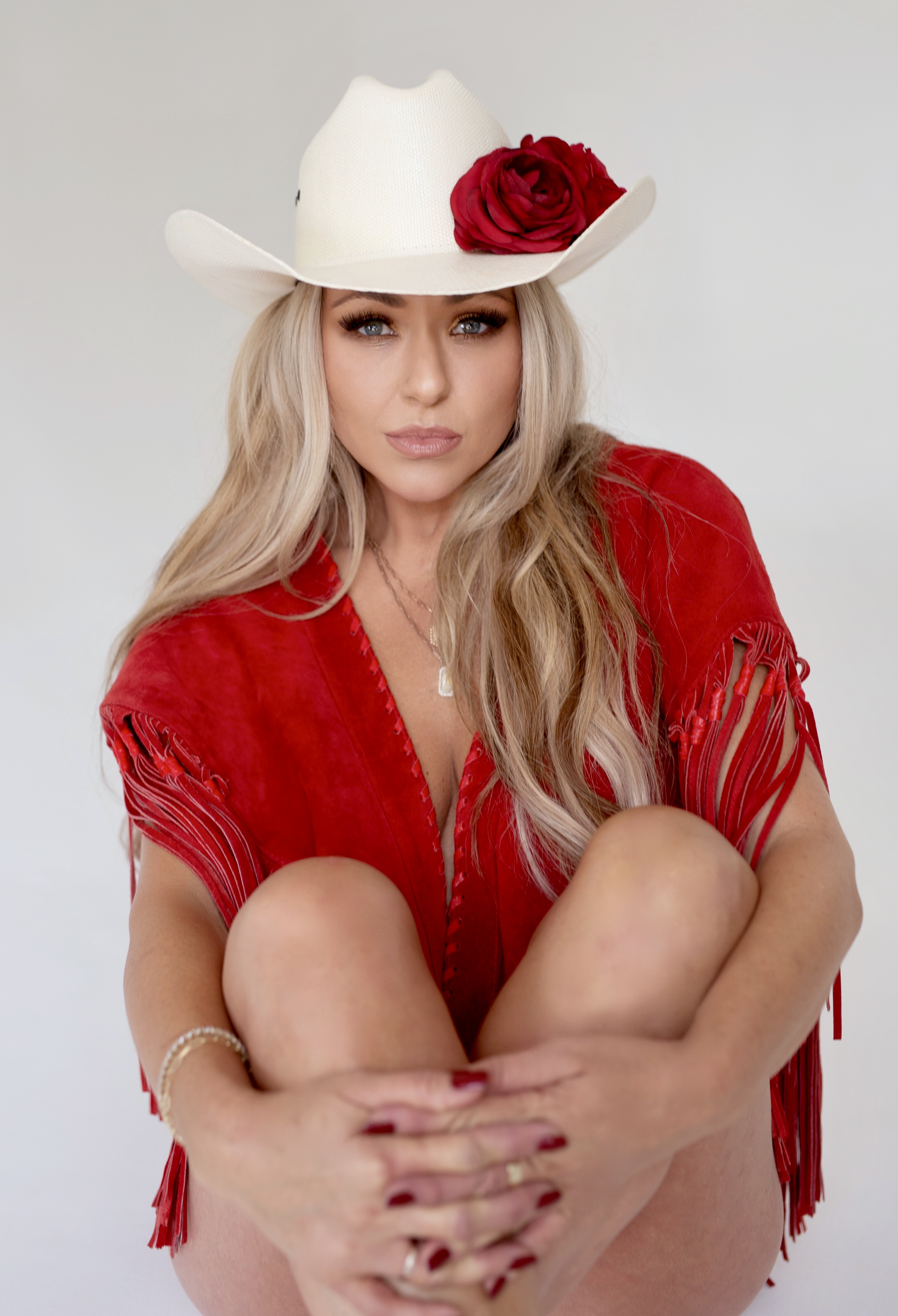
- Turner in 2024

Background information
- Born: July 29, 1987 (age 38); California, U.S.
- Origin: Nashville, Tennessee, U.S.
- Genres: Country
- Occupation: Singer-songwriter
- Instrument: Vocals
- Years active: 2012–present
- Label: Columbia Nashville
- Website: www.officialleahturner.com

Leah Galván Turner (born July 29, 1987) is a Mexican-American country music singer who was previously signed with Columbia Nashville.

== Early life and education ==
Turner was born on July 29, 1987, in California. She was raised on a ranch with horses, goats, and chickens in Morongo Valley, California. Turner attended the University of California, Santa Barbara and took music and songwriting classes. She later studied opera at the Music Academy of the West in Montecito. While participating in a songwriting class at UCSB, she performed for guest instructor Kenny Loggins, who encouraged her to move to Los Angeles to pursue a professional music career.

== Career ==
Turner took Kenny Loggins' advice and moved to Los Angeles to pursue a singing career. She worked with Humberto Gatica and David Foster, and later moved to Nashville, Tennessee to pursue a country career.

Turner was signed to Columbia Nashville in July 2013.Turner was signed to Columbia Nashville in July 2013. Her debut single, "Take the Keys," was co-written with Cary Barlowe and Jesse Frasure and released on October 7, 2013. The song debuted at number 60 on the Billboard Country Airplay chart dated for the week ending October 19, 2013, and peaked at number 37 while spending 23 weeks total listed. Her follow-up single, "Pull Me Back," spent one week on the Billboard Country Airplay chart at number 52. During her time with Columbia Nashville, Turner released a self-titled EP that was co-written and produced with Frasure and Barlowe.

Turner is recognized as the highest-charting solo Mexicana in country music. Her music video for "Love Like Legends" premiered on the Paramount+ billboard in Times Square through CMT. She was later featured in the GRAMMY Museum's Power of Women in Country Music exhibit, which included wardrobe from her career.

Turner serves on the Recording Academy's DEI Committee and is a mentor for the GRAMMY U program.

In 2024, she released "South of the Border", a collaboration with Jerrod Niemann, along with her bilingual EP This Is Mi. She has also recorded duets with Michael Salgado and Jerrod Niemann.

Throughout her career, Turner has shared the stage with artists such as Brad Paisley, Kenny Chesney, and Rascal Flatts. Her work has been covered by outlets including Billboard, GRAMMY.com, Rolling Stone Country, and People Country.

== Discography ==
=== Extended plays ===
Year	Title	Album details
2014	Leah Turner	Release date: May 6, 2014; Label: Columbia Records; Format: Music download
2024	This is Mi	Release date: October 4, 2024; Label: California Country Music; Format: Music download

=== Singles ===
Year	Single	Peak chart positions	Album
Year	Single	US Country Airplay	Album
2013	"Take the Keys"	37	Leah Turner
2014	"Pull Me Back"	52	Leah Turner
2023	"Love Like Legends"	—	Leah Turner
2024	"South of the Border"	—N/a	This Is Mi
2025	"Señorita"	—N/a	Non-album single
