= Kiss You in the Morning =

Single by Michael Ray

from the album Michael Ray
- Released: February 16, 2015
- Recorded: 2015 at Warner Bros. Records
- Genre: Country
- Length: 3:01
- Label: Warner Bros. Nashville/Atlantic
- Songwriters: Justin Wilson; Michael White
- Producer: Scott Hendricks

Michael Ray singles chronology
"Kiss You in the Morning" (2015)	"Real Men Love Jesus" (2015)

"Kiss You in the Morning" is a song recorded by American country music artist Michael Ray. It was released on February 16, 2015 as the first single from Ray's major-label debut album. The album, self-titled, was released on August 7. The song was written by Justin Wilson and Michael White and produced by Scott Hendricks.

== Critical reception ==
Country music blog Taste of Country reviewed the single favorably, saying that "The arrangement of this Florida-raised singer’s first single on Warner doesn’t separate it from much of what’s on the radio, but his lyrics and vocal performance do. He doesn’t use the song to show his range. It’s more of a storyteller’s track." Kevin John Coyne of Country Universe gave the song a D grade, writing that "Ray’s a decent enough singer and the production is controlled, so it’s not memorable for being bad. Trouble is, it’s not really memorable at all."

== Commercial performance ==
"Kiss You in the Morning" debuted at number 54 on the U.S. Billboard Country Airplay chart for the week of February 28, 2015. It also debuted at number 40 on the U.S. Billboard Hot Country Songs chart for the week of March 28, 2015. It also debuted at number 15 on the U.S. Billboard Bubbling Under Hot 100 Singles chart for the week of May 9, 2015. It also debuted at number 50 on the Canada Country chart for the week of May 16, 2015. The song has sold 308,000 copies in the US as of September 2015.

== Music video ==
The music video was directed by Edgar Esteves and premiered in June 2015.

== Chart performance ==
Chart (2015)	Peak position
Canada Hot 100 (Billboard)	73
Canada Country (Billboard)	13
US Billboard Hot 100	55
US Country Airplay (Billboard)	1
US Hot Country Songs (Billboard)	10

=== Year-end charts ===
Chart (2015)	Position
US Country Airplay (Billboard)	8
US Hot Country Songs (Billboard)	28

== Certifications ==
Region	Certification	Certified units/sales
Canada (Music Canada)	Gold	40,000^{‡}
^{‡} Sales+streaming figures based on certification alone.
