= Abby Anderson =

American country music singer-songwriter (born 1997)

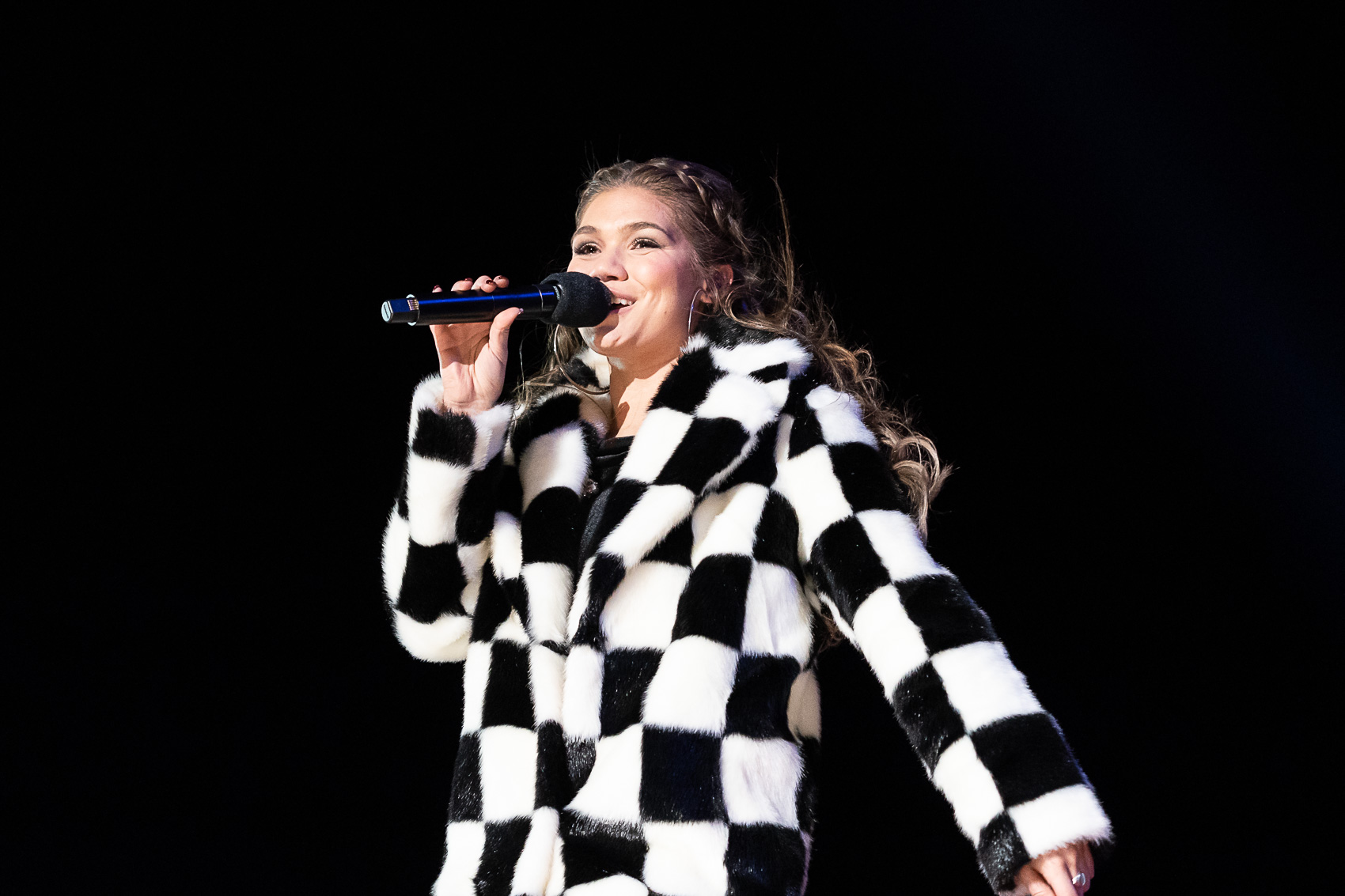
- Anderson performing at the 2018 National Christmas Tree lighting event

Background information
- Born: March 10, 1997 (age 29); Southlake, Texas, US
- Genre: Country
- Occupation: Singer-songwriter
- Instruments: Vocal; Piano; Guitar
- Label: Black River
- Spouse: Tyler Graham (m. 2021)
- Website: abbyandersonmusic.com

Abigail Denise Anderson (born March 10, 1997) is an American country music singer-songwriter from Southlake, Texas near Dallas. She is signed to the independent entertainment company, Black River Entertainment.

== Early life ==
Abby Anderson is one of seven children and is the second oldest of her five sisters and one brother. She began piano lessons at age 5. Her interest in country music comes from her mother - who comes from a family of country music singers and fans.

Anderson was able to play gigs around her home state of Texas after telling her parents she wanted to be homeschooled so she could work on her career as a musician.

In addition to music, she was the first girl to play on her middle school's football team.

At age 17, she finished high school early and moved to Nashville in February 2015.

== Career ==
Abby had her first taste of the music industry in 2014 when she performed “Let Freedom Ring” (Anderson's version of “My Country Tis of Thee”) on Glenn Beck's conservative talk show. The song became so popular that it landed on both the Billboard and iTunes charts.

After moving to Nashville at age 17, Anderson played gigs at popular Nashville venues such as The Bluebird Cafe, The Listening Room Cafe and Tin Roof while also working as a nanny to support herself. During a charity event at the Ryman Auditorium in 2017, Anderson received a publishing and record deal from Black River Entertainment.

In September of that year, she released “This Feeling,” her first song via Black River Records.

She was recognized by Pandora as a Country Artist to Watch in 2018 and CMT Listen Up in their “18 for 2018” List. She was also honored by being part of CMT's Next Women of Country Class of 2018 alongside Ashley McBryde and Kassi Ashton.

Her single, “Make Him Wait” was released in April 2018, which was written by Anderson with Tom Douglas and Josh Kerr. The song, which has been streamed on Spotify more than 4 million times, was inspired by dating advice she received from her parents. The music video for the song premiered on CMT in September 2018 and was directed by Chris Hicky.

On September 7, 2018, Anderson released her debut EP, ‘I’m Good,’ which consisted of five songs, via Black River Records. One of the songs, “Dance Away My Broken Heart” was written by country singers Kelsea Ballerini, Thomas Rhett and Rhett Akins.

She made her debut at the Grand Ole Opry on September 8, 2018 and performed during the National Christmas Tree Lighting in November 2018 in Washington D.C.

Anderson performed at CMA Fest in 2017 and 2018. She has toured with Russell Dickerson, Chase Rice, and Brett Eldredge and performed at Dierks Bentley's Seven Peaks Festival in August 2018.

She released a cover of *NSYNC's holiday song, “Merry Christmas, Happy Holidays” in November 2018 exclusively on Amazon Music as part of their Amazon Originals series.

In 2019, Anderson was recognized as a member of The Bobby Bones Show's Class Of 2019, Music Row Magazine's 2019 Next Big Things and Sounds Like Nashville's list of Country Artists to Watch in 2019.

Anderson, alongside country singer Jimmie Allen, released a cover of Lady Gaga and Bradley Cooper's GRAMMY and Academy Award-winning song “Shallow” from A Star Is Born in February 2019.

After releasing her song “Good Lord” in March 2019, July 2019, Anderson made her television debut on the TODAY Show. Her single, “Flowers,” was released in October 2019. She joined Rob Thomas during his Chip Tooth Smile Tour in 2019.

Anderson cites Dolly Parton, Ray Charles, Linda Ronstadt, Roy Orbison, Stevie Wonder, K. T. Oslin, Reba McEntire, Shania Twain, The Judds, and Elvis as some of her major musical influences.

=== Musical style ===
She has been described as a country, country rock singer.

=== Influence ===
She has cited Ray Charles, Dolly Parton, Roy Orbison, Stevie Wonder, K. T. Oslin and Elvis Presley among her influences. Other musical influences are Aretha Franklin, The Temptations, The Supremes, Linda Ronstadt, Freddy Fender and The Judds.

== Tours ==
=== Co-headlining tours ===
- The Chipped Tooth Tour (with the American singer, Rob Thomas)

=== Guest appearance ===
- The Long Way Tour (Brett Eldredge and Devin Dawson)
