= Michael Ray (singer) =

American country singer (born 1988)

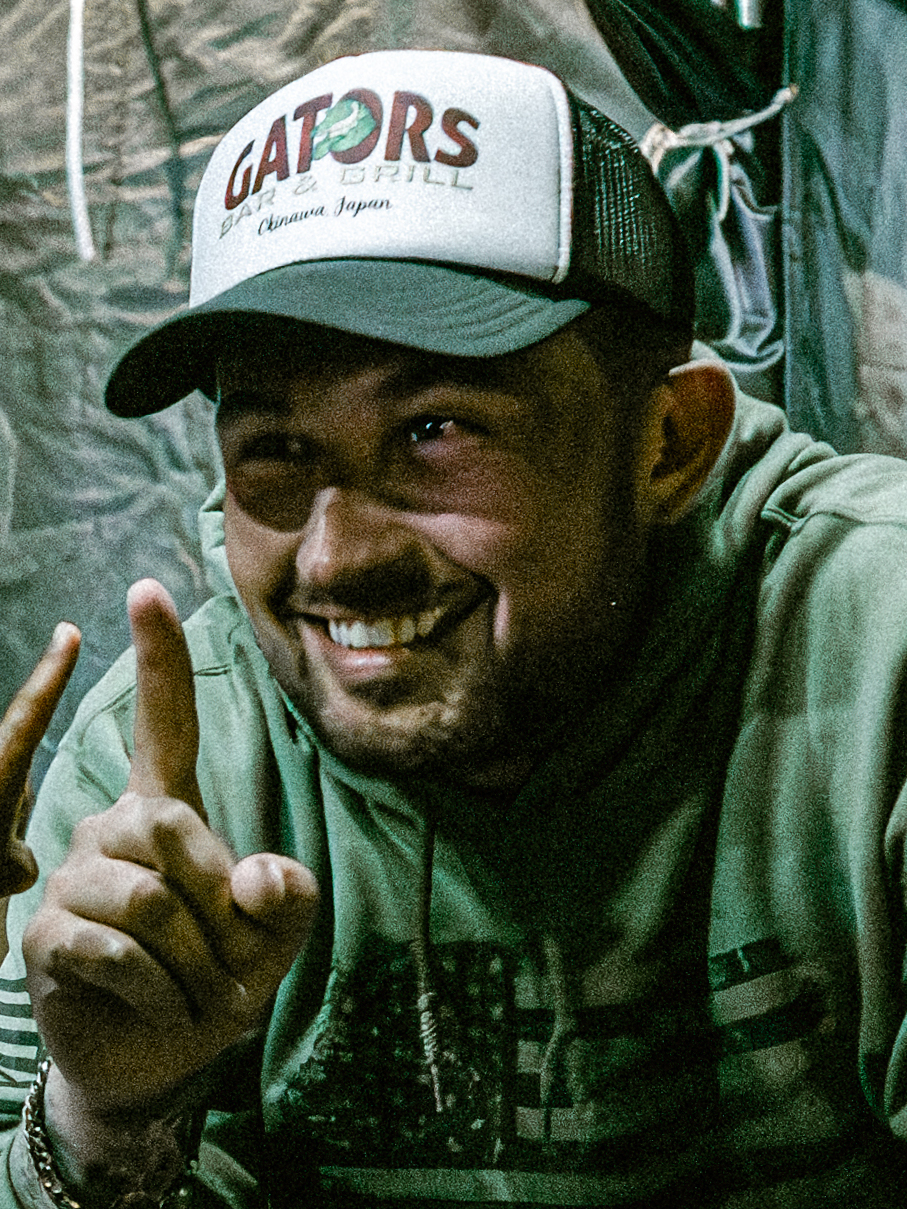
- Ray in 2023

Background information
- Born: Michael Ray Roach; April 29, 1988 (age 37); Eustis, Florida, U.S.
- Genres: Country
- Occupations: Singer; songwriter
- Instrument: Vocals
- Years active: 2010–present
- Labels: Warner Bros. Nashville; Atlantic Nashville
- Spouse: Carly Pearce (m. 2019; div. 2020)
- Website: michaelraymusic.com

Michael Ray Roach (born April 29, 1988) is an American country music singer and songwriter. He is signed to Warner Music Nashville. He has released two albums for the label: Michael Ray and Amos.

== Biography ==
Ray was born in Eustis, Florida. He was inspired by his grandfather Amos "Wilson" Roach, who played music for him and taught him how to play guitar, in addition to having him perform at assisted living centers. Ray chose to form a band in southern Florida after graduating high school, and a disc jockey at WPCV began playing his music. He released an album independently in 2010, which was discovered by manager Tony Conway.

Ray was mentored by John Rich of Big & Rich on the singing competition The Next: Fame Is at Your Doorstep, which he won. He and Rich co-wrote Big & Rich's 2015 single, "Run Away with You". After winning the competition, Ray was signed to Warner Bros. Records Nashville. His first EP, Tour Bootleg, was released in 2014. Two of the EP's tracks, "Kiss You in the Morning" (which went to number one on the Country Airplay charts in 2015) and "Think a Little Less," appeared later on his self-titled second album, released in 2015, becoming his first and third singles, respectively. The track "Real Men Love Jesus" was named as Ray's second single. Ray supported the album with a tour.

On June 16, 2017, Ray released the single "Get to You" ahead of his third studio album, Amos. After the album's release in 2018, it produced two more singles: "One That Got Away" and "Her World or Mine." It was produced by Scott Hendricks. In September 2020, Ray released the single "Whiskey and Rain" ahead of his fourth studio album, originally set to be released in 2021.

== Personal life ==
Michael Ray has one sister and two half sisters. His father is Jerry Roach.

On July 19, 2018, Ray confirmed that he had started dating country singer Carly Pearce. They were engaged on December 19, 2018. and married on October 6, 2019 on a farm in Goodlettsville, Tennessee northeast of Nashville. In June 2020, Pearce filed for divorce from Ray after eight months of marriage.

== Discography ==
Michael Ray discography
- Studio albums: 3
- EPs: 3
- Singles: 8
- Music videos: 10
- Other charted songs: 1
- No. 1 singles: 2

=== Studio albums ===
Title	Album details	Peak chart positions			Sales
Title	Album details	US Country	US	AUS	Sales
Michael Ray	Release date: January 29, 2010; Label: Self-released; Formats: CD, digital download	—	—	—	
Michael Ray	Release date: August 7, 2015; Label: Atlantic Nashville; Formats: CD, digital download	4	21	60	US: 51,000
Amos	Release date: June 1, 2018; Label: Atlantic Nashville; Formats: CD, digital download	5	53	—	US: 16,600
"—" denotes releases that did not chart

=== Extended plays ===
Title	EP details	Peak chart positions	
Title	EP details	US Country	US Heat
Tour Bootleg	Release date: November 2014; Label: Warner Bros. Nashville; Formats: Digital download	—	—
Kiss You in the Morning	Release date: April 28, 2015; Label: Warner Bros. Nashville; Formats: CD, digital download	37	15
Higher Education	Release date: August 27, 2021; Label: Warner Bros. Nashville; Formats: CD, digital download	—	—
Dive Bars & Broken Hearts	Release date: June 23, 2023; Label: Warner Bros. Nashville; Formats: CD, digital download	—	—
"—" denotes releases that did not chart

=== Singles ===
Year	Single	Peak chart positions					Sales	Certifications	Album
Year	Single	US Country	US Country Airplay	US	CAN Country	CAN	Sales	Certifications	Album
2015	"Kiss You in the Morning"	10	1	55	13	73	US: 308,000	RIAA: Gold; MC: Gold	Michael Ray
2015	"Real Men Love Jesus"	28	17	—	44	—	US: 66,000		Michael Ray
2016	"Think a Little Less"	3	2	54	23	—	US: 278,000	RIAA: Platinum	Michael Ray
2017	"Get to You"	17	15	— (Note: "Get to You" did not enter the Billboard Hot 100, but peaked at number two on Bubbling Under Hot 100 chart, which acts as a 25-song quasi-extension of the Hot 100.)	43	—	US: 121,000	RIAA: Gold	Amos
2018	"One That Got Away"	10	3	67	7	—	US: 37,000	RIAA: Gold	Amos
2019	"Her World or Mine"	31	22	— (Note: "Her World or Mine" did not enter the Billboard Hot 100, but peaked at number 12 on Bubbling Under Hot 100 chart, which acts as a 25-song quasi-extension of the Hot 100.)	39	—		RIAA: Gold	Amos
2020	"Whiskey and Rain"	6	1	37	—	—		RIAA: Platinum	Higher Education
2022	"Holy Water"	—	32	—	—	—			Higher Education
2023	"Spirits and Demons" (with Meghan Patrick)	—	35	—	—	—			Dive Bars & Broken Hearts
"—" denotes releases that did not chart

=== Other charted songs ===
Year	Song	Peak positions	Album
Year	Song	US Country	Album
2015	"Another Girl"	50	Michael Ray

=== Music videos ===
Year	Video	Director
2015	"Kiss You in the Morning"	Edgar Esteves
2015	"Real Men Love Jesus"	Sam Siske
2016	"Think a Little Less"	Cody Kern
2017	"Think a Little Less"	Jack Guy
2018	"Get to You"	Unlisted
2018	"Fan Girl"	Unlisted
2018	"Her World or Mine"	Unlisted
2018	"Summer Water"	Unlisted
2019	"One That Got Away"	Sean Hagwell
2019	"Her World or Mine"	Daniel Carberry and Keenan O'Reilly
2020	"Whiskey and Rain"	Unlisted
2021	"Picture"	Unlisted
2021	"Just the Way I Am"	Unlisted
2021	"Higher Education" (featuring Kid Rock, Lee Brice, Billy Gibbons, and Tim Montana)	Unlisted
2022	"Holy Water"	Unlisted

== Awards and nominations ==
Year	Award show	Category	Result
2016	American Country Countdown Awards	Breakthrough Male of the Year	Nominated
