= The Farm (album) =

Studio album by The Farm
- Released: July 17, 2012
- Genre: Country
- Length: 42:40
- Label: Elektra
- Producer: Nick Hoffman; Danny Myrick

Singles from The Farm
- 1. "Home Sweet Home" Released: October 17, 2011; 2. "Be Grateful" Released: September 17, 2012

Professional ratings
Review scores
Source	Rating
Allmusic	3.5/5 stars
Slant Magazine	2/5 stars

The Farm is the only album by American country music band The Farm. It was released on July 17, 2012, via Elektra Records. The album includes the top 20 single "Home Sweet Home."

== Track listing ==
No.	Title	Writer(s)	Lead vocals	Length
1.	"Farm Party"	Nick Hoffman, Damien Horne, Krista Marie, Danny Myrick, Bridgette Tatum	Hoffman	3:17
2.	"Home Sweet Home"	Hoffman, Horne, Marie, Myrick	Hoffman, Horne	4:05
3.	"Sweet Sweet Sunshine"	Hoffman, Horne, Marie, Myrick	Hoffman	3:46
4.	"Be Grateful"	Marc Beeson, Rodney Clawson	Hoffman, Horne, Marie	4:06
5.	"Nowhere Road"	Horne, Marie, Myrick, Jeff Spence	Horne, Marie	3:31
6.	"Fresh Off the Farm"	Derek George, Myrick, Kip Raines	Hoffman	3:22
7.	"Little Boat"	Wil Nance, Bob Regan	Hoffman, Horne, Marie	3:32
8.	"That 100 Miles"	Shane Minor, Myrick, Jeffrey Steele	Hoffman, Marie	4:19
9.	"Every Time I Fall in Love"	Al Anderson, Sarah Buxton, Ken Johnson	Marie	3:41
10.	"The Train I'm On"	Hoffman, Horne, Marie, Myrick	Horne	3:25
11.	"Walkin'"	Horne, Robert Octetre	Hoffman, Horne, Marie	5:36

== Chart performance ==
=== Album ===
Chart (2012)	Peak position
US Billboard 200	183
US Billboard Top Country Albums	35
US Billboard Top Heatseekers	7
