= Sunset Man =

Studio album by James Otto
- Released: April 8, 2008
- Genre: Country
- Length: 42:58
- Label: Raybaw; Warner Bros. Nashville
- Producer: James Otto; John Rich; Jay DeMarcus

James Otto chronology
Days of Our Lives (2004)	Sunset Man (2008)	Shake What God Gave Ya (2010)

Singles from Sunset Man
- 1. "Just Got Started Lovin' You" Released: July 3, 2007; 2. "For You" Released: June 9, 2008; 3. "These Are the Good Ole Days" Released: October 13, 2008

Professional ratings
Review scores
Source	Rating
Allmusic	3.5/5 stars
Engine 145	4.5/5 stars
Country Weekly	3.5/5 stars
Country Standard Time	favorable

Sunset Man is the second studio album by American country music singer James Otto, released April 8, 2008 on Warner Bros. Records. The lead-off single, "Just Got Started Lovin' You", reached Number One on the Billboard Hot Country Songs charts in May 2008. Following it were "For You" and "These Are the Good Ole Days", both of which peaked in the mid-30s. As of May 2010, the album has sold 389,000 according to Nielsen SoundScan.

== Content ==
The first single release from Sunset Man was "Just Got Started Lovin' You". Otto's first single release since "Sunday Morning and Saturday Night" on Mercury Nashville in 2004, "Just Got Started Lovin' You" reached Number One on the U.S. Billboard country singles charts in early 2008. The song was also the Number One country hit of 2008 according to Billboard Year-End. "Ain't Gonna Stop", co-written by Big Kenny and John Rich of Big & Rich, and Nikki Sixx of Mötley Crüe, was originally slated as the second single. However, it was withdrawn and replaced with "For You", which spent two non-consecutive weeks at number 39 on the country charts before falling out of the Top 40. After it came "These Are the Good Ole Days", which Otto co-wrote with fellow MuzikMafia member and former MCA Nashville artist Shannon Lawson. This song reached number 36 in February 2009.

Otto produced the album with assistance from Rich on all tracks except "For You", "You Don't Act Like My Woman", and "The Man That I Am", which he instead produced with Jay DeMarcus of Rascal Flatts, who is also Otto's brother-in-law.

== Track listing ==
No.	Title	Writer(s)	Length
1.	"Ain't Gonna Stop"	James Otto, Big Kenny, John Rich, Nikki Sixx	3:17
2.	"Just Got Started Lovin' You"	Jim Femino, Otto, D. Vincent Williams	3:54
3.	"For You"	Jim Brown, Liz Hengber	3:24
4.	"These Are the Good Ole Days"	Shannon Lawson, Otto	3:36
5.	"Where Angels Hang Around"	Monty Criswell, Otto	4:18
6.	"Sunset Man"	Lawson, Otto, Rich	3:31
7.	"You Don't Act Like My Woman"	Jay DeMarcus, Otto, Monty Powell, Roger Riley	4:13
8.	"When a Woman's Not Watching"	Otto, Larry Shell, Kim Williams	4:02
9.	"Drink & Dial"	Vicky McGehee, Otto, Rich	4:02
10.	"Damn Right"	Otto, Powell	4:22
11.	"The Man That I Am"	Cory Mayo, Craig Wiseman	3:58

== Personnel ==
Musicians

- Big Kenny - background vocals (track 1)
- Tom Bukovac - acoustic guitar (track 3, 7, 11), electric guitar (track 3, 7, 11)
- Eric Darken - percussion (track 3, 7, 11)
- Jay DeMarcus - bass guitar (track 3, 7, 11), background vocals (track 7)
- Dan Dugmore - steel guitar (track 7)
- Tommy Harden - drums (all tracks except 7), tambourine (tracks 2, 4, 6)
- Tony Harrell - keyboards (track 3), Hammond B-3 organ (track 3, 7, 11), piano (track 7), Wurlitzer electric piano (track 11)
- Wes Hightower - background vocals (track 5, 6)
- Mike Johnson - steel guitar (track 2, 3, 5, 6, 8, 9, 10)
- Charlie Judge - programming (track 3)
- Troy Lancaster - electric guitar (all tracks except 3, 7, 11), acoustic guitar (track 5, 8)
- Shannon Lawson - background vocals (track 4)
- Hillary Lindsey - background vocals (track 6)
- Chris McHugh - drums (track 7)
- Johnny Neel - Hammnond B-3 organ (track 2, 8, 9), Wurlitzer electric piano (track 2), piano (track 5, 8, 9)
- James Otto - vocals; acoustic guitar (track 6, 10)
- Russ Pahl - electric guitar (track 4)
- John Rich - background vocals (tracks 1, 2, 8, 9)
- Michael Rojas - piano (track 1, 6, 10), Hammond B-3 organ (track 4, 10)
- Jimmy Taylor - harmonica (track 4)
- Glenn Worf - bass guitar (tracks 1, 4, 6, 10)
- Craig Young - bass guitar (track 2, 5, 8, 9)
- Jonathan Yudkin - fiddle (track 1, 2, 4, 8, 9, 11), mandolin (track 3, 4, 5, 6, 8, 11), cello (track 5)

Technical

- Jay DeMarcus - production (tracks 3, 7, 11)
- Paul Hart - engineering (all tracks except 3, 7, 11)
- Charlie Judge - string arrangement (track 3)
- Mills Logan - recording (tracks 3, 7, 11)
- Sean Neff - recording (tracks 3, 7, 11)
- James Otto - production (all tracks)
- Bart Pursley - recording (all tracks except 3, 7, 11)
- John Rich - production (all tracks except 3, 7, 11)
- Clarke Schleicher - recording (all tracks except 3, 7, 11)
- Trina Shoemaker - mixing
- Chris Stone - engineering (all tracks except 3, 7, 11)

== Chart performance ==
=== Weekly charts ===
Chart (2008)	Peak position
US Billboard 200	3
US Top Country Albums (Billboard)	2

=== Year-end charts ===
Chart (2008)	Position
US Billboard 200	132
US Top Country Albums (Billboard)	23

=== Singles ===
Year	Single	Peak chart positions			
Year	Single	US Country	US	US Pop	CAN
2007	"Just Got Started Lovin' You"	1	27	65	71
2008	"For You"	39	—	—	—
2008	"These Are the Good Old Days"	36	—	—	—
