= Home Sweet Home (The Farm song) =

Single by The Farm

from the album The Farm
- Released: October 17, 2011
- Genre: Country
- Length: 4:05
- Label: Elektra
- Songwriter(s): Nick Hoffman; Damien Horne; Krista Marie; Danny Myrick
- Producer(s): Nick Hoffman; Danny Myrick

The Farm singles chronology
"Home Sweet Home" (2011)	"Be Grateful" (2012)

"Home Sweet Home" is a song co-written and recorded by American country music band The Farm. It was released in October 2011 as the first single from their debut album The Farm. The song was written by band members Nick Hoffman, Damien Horne and Krista Marie with Danny Myrick.

== Critical reception ==
Billy Dukes of Taste of Country gave the song four and a half stars out of five, saying that "There’s something new with each spin, including some delicious imagery late in the song."

== Music video ==
The music video was directed by The Edde Brothers and premiered in February 2012.

== Chart performance ==
"Home Sweet Home" debuted at number 54 on the U.S. Billboard Hot Country Songs chart for the week of November 5, 2011.

Chart (2011–2012)	Peak position
US Country Songs (Billboard)	19
US Billboard Bubbling Under Hot 100	20

=== Year-end charts ===
Chart (2012)	Position
US Country Songs (Billboard)	68
