= The Farm (American band) =

American country music trio

- Also known as: The Farm Inc.
- Origin: Nashville, Tennessee, U.S.
- Genres: Country
- Years active: 2011–2014
- Labels: All In/Elektra/New Revolution
- Past members: Nick Hoffman; Damien Horne; Krista Marie

The Farm, also known as The Farm Inc., was an American country music trio consisting of Nick Hoffman (vocals, fiddle), Damien Horne (vocals, keyboard, guitar) and Krista Marie (vocals, guitar). Signed to All In Records in association with Warner Music Nashville and Elektra Records and New Revolution, the trio has released the singles "Home Sweet Home" and "Be Grateful", which have charted on Hot Country Songs. Horne is a former member of John Rich's songwriting group MuzikMafia, while Marie is a former solo artist for Broken Bow Records. Hoffman is the host and producer of the award-winning TV show "Nick's Wild Ride" that airs on Outdoor Channel and played fiddle in Kenny Chesney's road band. The three met during a songwriting session which included former Western Flyer member Danny Myrick, who also became the group's producer.

Their self-titled debut album, released in 2012, produced two top 40 hits on Country Airplay: "Home Sweet Home" and "Be Grateful". In 2014, they announced a third single, "Mud".

== Discography ==
=== Studio albums ===
Title	Details	Peak chart positions		
Title	Details	US Country	US	US Heat
The Farm	Release date: July 17, 2012; Label: Elektra; Formats: CD, music download	35	183	7

=== Singles ===
Year	Single	Peak chart positions			Album
Year	Single	US Country	US Country Airplay	US Bubbling	Album
2011	"Home Sweet Home"	19		20	The Farm
2012	"Be Grateful"	59	36	—	The Farm
2014	"Mud"	—	—	—	—
"—" denotes releases that did not chart

=== Music videos ===
Year	Video	Director
2012	"Home Sweet Home"	The Edde Brothers
2014	"Mud"	Jayson Wall
