= Days of Our Lives (disambiguation) =

Days of Our Lives is a U.S daytime soap opera airing on the NBC television network.

Days of Our Lives may also refer to:

- Days of Our Lives (James Otto album), 2004
- Days of Our Lives (Bro'Sis album), 2003
- "Days of Our Lives", a song by De La Soul from their 2004 album The Grind Date

== See also ==
- "These Are the Days of Our Lives", a 1991 song by Queen
- "Days of Our Livez", a 1996 single by Bone Thugs-n-Harmony
- Queen: Days of Our Lives, a 2011 BBC documentary about the rock band Queen
