= Shake What God Gave Ya =

Studio album by James Otto
- Released: September 14, 2010
- Genre: Country
- Length: 45:43
- Label: Warner Bros. Nashville
- Producers: James Otto; Paul Worley; Monty Powell

James Otto chronology
Sunset Man (2008)	Shake What God Gave Ya (2010)

Singles from Shake What God Gave Ya
- 1. "Groovy Little Summer Song" Released: March 8, 2010; 2. "Soldiers & Jesus" Released: September 7, 2010

Shake What God Gave Ya is the third studio album from American country music artist James Otto. It was released in the United States on September 14, 2010, through Warner Bros. Nashville. The album includes two singles, "Groovy Little Summer Song" and "Soldiers & Jesus". Prior to its release, Otto charted the single "Since You Brought It Up", which was not included in an album. Otto produced the entire album with Paul Worley, with Monty Powell as a co-producer on the title track.

== Background ==
In an interview with The Boot, Otto described his new record saying, "This is a declaration of who I am, this country-soul sound is where we're going, and if you like it, this is for you." In an interview with Music Row, Otto called the content on the album "sexy, sultry, and soulful", and went on to say that "Musically I’d say I’m the love child between Ronnie Milsap and Barry White.”

== Reception ==
=== Critical ===
Professional ratings
Review scores
Source	Rating
Allmusic	4/5 stars
Country Weekly	3.5/5 stars
Parcbench	2.5/4 stars
Roughstock	3.5/5 stars

Stephen Thomas Erlewine called it "a fully formed, seductive country-soul record" and said it "rolls smooth and easy, locking into a cool relaxed groove early on and never leaving it." Jessica Phillips with Country Weekly rated the album three-and-a-half stars out of five, saying Otto's "raw, impassioned style" brought out many soul-influenced songs, and that the album "focuses on lighthearted or romantic fare."

Greg Victor with Parcbench called it "the best country-meets-soul-meets-rock-meets-blues album to hit the scene since the early days of Lyle Lovett’s Large Band, and said the album put "Otto in a class all by himself." Allen Jacobs with Roughstock called the tracks on the album "smart, soulful and sexy country songs" and said the album was "nowhere near a traditional country record [but] is nonetheless a strong third album."

== Track listing ==
No.	Title	Writer(s)	Length
1.	"Groovy Little Summer Song"	Al Anderson, Carson Chamberlain, James Otto	3:37
2.	"Are Ya With Me"	Marv Green, Otto, Chris Wallin	3:21
3.	"Lover Man"	Anderson, Jim Femino, Otto	2:43
4.	"Soldiers & Jesus"	Otto, Wallin	4:45
5.	"Love Don't Cost a Thing"	John Eddie, Otto	4:10
6.	"Sun Comes 'Round Again"	Brice Long, Chris Stapleton	4:22
7.	"Shake What God Gave Ya"	Otto, Monty Powell	3:24
8.	"It's a Good Time (For a Good Time)"	Patrick Jason Matthews, Otto	3:49
9.	"Just Like Sunshine"	Otto, Wallin	3:33
10.	"Let's Just Let Go"	Femino, Carl Marsh, Otto, Arlos Smith	3:43
11.	"She Comes To Me"	Marsh, Terry McBride, Stapleton	3:58
12.	"Good Thing's Gone Bad" (featuring Ronnie Milsap)	James LeBlanc, Gary Nichols, Jon Nicholson, Otto	4:19

== Personnel ==
Musicians

- Al Anderson - electric guitar solo (2)
- Jim Brown - piano (10), Hammond B-3 organ (2, 3, 10), synthesizer (2)
- Tyler Cain - electric guitar (7), acoustic guitar (7)
- Chad Cromwell - drums (except 7 and 10)
- Glen Duncan - mandolin (2, 10)
- Tommy Harden - drums (10), percussion (2)
- Mike Johnson - steel guitar (1, 4, 5, 6, 8, 9, 11, 12)
- Doug Kahan - bass guitar (10)
- Troy Lancaster - electric guitar (2, 4, 5, 6, 8–12), electric guitar solo (1, 3)
- Shannon Lawson - background vocals (3, 4, 5, 7, 8, 9, 11)
- Rob McNelley - electric guitar (1, 4, 5, 8, 9, 11), electric guitar solo (12)
- Justin Meeks - drums (7), percussion (7)
- Alexander "Sasha" Ostrovsky - Dobro (7)
- James Otto - vocals, electric guitar solo (6, 8)
- Allison Prestwood - bass guitar (1, 4, 8)
- Michael Rhodes - bass guitar (2, 3, 5, 6, 9, 11, 12)
- Mike Rojas - piano (1, 4, 6), Hammond B-3 organ (1, 4, 6, 11, 12), Wurlitzer electric piano (5, 8, 11, 12), accordion (5)
- Steve Sheehan - acoustic guitar (2, 3, 10), steel guitar (2, 3, 10)
- Adam Shoenfeld - electric guitar (6)
- Chris Stapleton - background vocals (6)
- Russell Terrell - background vocals (2)
- Ilya Toshinsky - banjo (7)
- Biff Watson - acoustic guitar (1, 4, 5, 6, 8, 9, 11, 12)
- Kyle Whalum - bass guitar (7)
- Shannon Wickline - piano (9), Hammond B-3 organ (7, 9), synthesizer (7)
- Paul Worley - electric guitar (5)

Strings (tracks 10 and 11)

- Karen Winkelmann, Pamela Sixfin, David DAvidson, and David Angell - violin
- Jim Grosjean, Monisa Angell - violas
- Anthony LaMarchina, Sari Reist - cellos
- Mary Kathryn VanOsdale - double bass

Technical

- Ben Fowler - recording (3, 9)
- Paul Hart - recording (2, 10)
- Erik Hellerman - string recording (10, 11)
- Carl Marsh - string arranger (10, 11)
- Andrew Mendelson - mastering
- James Otto - producer (all tracks)
- Monty Powell - producer (7 only)
- Clarke Schleicher - recording (1, 4, 5, 8, 11, 12), mixing (all tracks)
- Trina Shoemaker - recording (6)
- Matt Troja - recording (7)
- Karen Winkelmann - string contractor (10, 11)
- Paul Worley - producer (all tracks)

== Chart performance ==
=== Album ===
Chart (2010)	Peak position
U.S. Billboard Top Country Albums	10
U.S. Billboard 200	63

=== Singles ===
Year	Single	Peak chart positions
Year	Single	US Country
2010	"Groovy Little Summer Song"	26
2010	"Soldiers & Jesus"	34
