= We Never Sleep =

We Never Sleep may refer to:

- "We never sleep", motto of the Pinkertons
- "We never sleep", motto of the Ancient Mystic Order of Samaritans
- We Never Sleep (film), a 1917 American short comedy film
- "We Never Sleep", a 1988 song by Boredoms on the album Osorezan no Stooges Kyo
- "We Never Sleep", a 2015 song by Gavin Becker
- We Never Sleep, a 2006 LP by Drop the Lime
