= In Real Life (band) =

American boy band

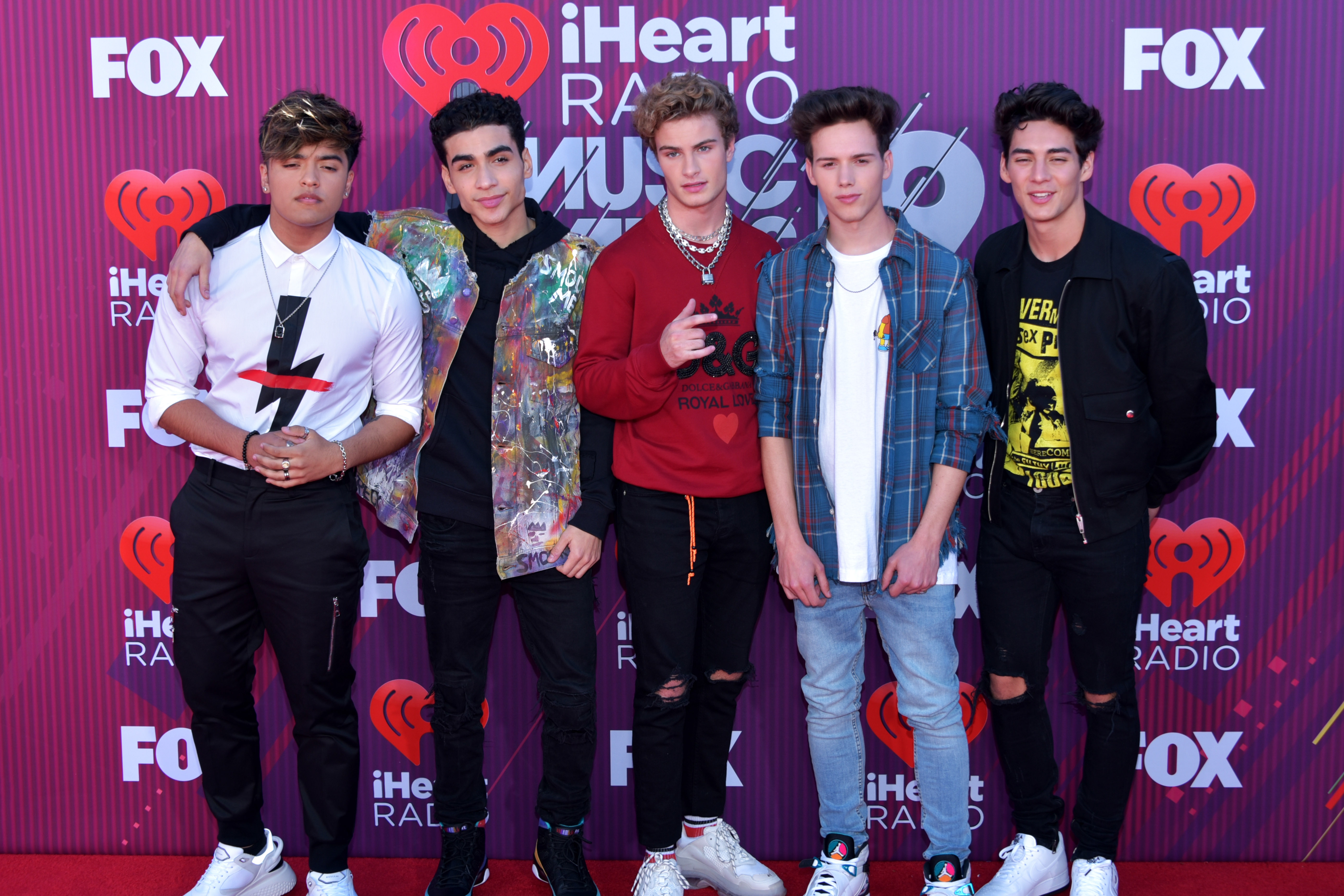
- In Real Life at the 2019 iHeartRadio Music Awards in Los Angeles, California. Left to right: Sergio Calderon Jr, Drew Ramos, Brady Tutton, Conor Michael Smith, and Chance Perez

Background information
- Also known as: IRL
- Origin: Los Angeles, California, United States
- Genres: Pop
- Years active: 2017–2020
- Labels: Hollywood; Broke Hero Records
- Past members: Brady Tutton; Chance Perez; Drew Ramos; Sergio Calderon Jr.; Conor Micheal Smith

In Real Life (IRL) was an American boy band composed of Brady Tutton, Chance Perez, Drew Ramos, Sergio Calderon, and Conor Smith, the final five vocalists from the American reality television music competition series Boy Band. The show premiered June 22, 2017, on ABC.

Due to lack of success, the band was dropped from their Hollywood Records label in 2019. In 2020, the band announced their split.

== History ==
=== 2017: Formation ===
The ten-episode season of the American television music competition series Boy Band began with thirty young male vocalists competing to become a member of the new five-member boy band. Each week, the boys would rotate into different groups and perform, at the end, the "architects" would put either two or three boys up for elimination and through live voting, a boy would be chosen by America to be saved. At the end of the season, the five remaining boys would form the boy band and receive a recording contract with Hollywood Records. After a 24-hour voting period the week before, it was announced at the final live show on August 24, 2017, that Tutton, Perez, Ramos, Calderon and Smith were the winning members, thus forming the boy band In Real Life and performing their debut single, "Eyes Closed".

Following their formation, In Real Life performed live on various television programs including Total Request Live in November 2017, Good Morning America in December 2017, and on Live with Kelly and Ryan in February 2018. That same year, they released an acoustic version of "Eyes Closed", along with two holiday songs—"Feel This Christmas" and "I'll Be Home Christmas".

=== 2018–2020: She Do and split ===
In February 2018, they appeared on Jimmy Kimmel Live!, and performed on ¡Despierta América! that April. In 2018, the band released several singles, starting with "Tattoo (How 'Bout You)", which peaked at number 29 on Billboard's Mainstream Top 40 chart for radio play. Other released singles included "How Badly", "Tonight Belongs to You", and "Got Me Good".

In May 2018, it was announced that In Real Life would open in a supporting slot in July and August on the 2018 American Idol summer tour. In September 2018, they headlined the Tonight Belongs To You tour, performing in small venues across the U.S. and Asia. The tour concluded in November. In 2019, they released the singles "Crazy AF", "Somebody Like You", and "Hurt For Long". Their debut album She Do, which features all of their singles from the past two years along with three new songs, was released on August 23, 2019. Their third Christmas single, "California Christmas", was announced to be released on November 29, 2019. The band created their own label, Broke Hero Records, after being dropped from Hollywood Records.

On January 20, 2020, In Real Life announced their separation on Instagram.

== Artistry ==
In Real Life was a pop boy band that experimented with other sounds such as pop rap, dance-pop, teen pop and Latin pop.

They cite One Direction as their main influence and are compared to them for both starting off on reality television. They also cite Backstreet Boys, Boyz II Men and The Jackson 5. Individual members of the group also cite influences including Charlie Puth, Bruno Mars, Frank Ocean, Logic, Machine Gun Kelly, Future, Shawn Mendes, Ed Sheeran, Justin Timberlake, Sam Smith, Jon Bellion, Jay-Z, Kendrick Lamar, Rita Ora, Eminem, NF and Nas.

== Members ==
=== Brady Tutton ===
Brady Patrick Tutton was born on December 7, 2001 (age 24) and is from Shorewood, Wisconsin. For his Boy Band audition, Tutton sang "On Bended Knee" by Boyz II Men. He went through the ten-week competition without being placed in the bottom two or three. Brady Tutton is a trained classical vocalist and an actor. He played Brock on the ABC sitcom Fresh Off the Boat (2015), and played the lead role in the 2018 film, The Rocket.

=== Chance Pérez ===
Chance Nickolas Pérez was born on November 10, 1997 (age 28) and comes from Seal Beach, California. In 2016, Perez auditioned for America's Got Talent with bandmates Jordan Pérez and Tyler Reardon as "The WVKE". The group was buzzed by Howie Mandel and Heidi Klum, but criticized by Simon Cowell, leading to their elimination during the audition phase; however, Pérez's vocals were individually praised by Cowell. In 2017, Pérez auditioned for Boy Band, singing "Somebody to Love" by Queen. From 2021 to 2023, Perez portrayed Javi García, the Black Dino Fury & Cosmic Fury Ranger in Power Rangers Dino Fury and Power Rangers Cosmic Fury. In 2024, he competed on Building the Band, and was the very first contestant to be eliminated.

=== Drew Ramos ===
Andrew Luís Ramos (known professionally as Drew) was born on October 23, 1997 (age 28) and comes from the Bronx, New York. In 2017, Ramos auditioned for the first season of ABC's Boy Band, singing Sam Smith's "Stay with Me". Along with Tutton and Perez, Ramos went through the competition without being placed in the bottom two or three. His breakout performance (during the competition) was MAXED's performance of Lauryn Hill's rendition of "Can't Take My Eyes Off You".

=== Sergio Calderón ===
Sergio Aguilar Calderón, Jr. (known professionally as Sergio JR.) was born on October 6, 2000 (age 25) and is from Redwood City, California. He was a student at Woodside Priory School before auditioning for Boy Band, where he performed an English-Spanish bilingual rendition of Prince Royce's "Stand by Me". On August 10, 2017, Calderón was placed in the bottom two, along with former contestant Devin Hayes, but he was saved by the fans and viewers who voted for him to stay. On May 22, 2020, he released his first single "No es Fácil".

=== Conor Michael Smith ===
Conor Michael Smith (formerly known as Michael Conor until June 2019) was born on June 7, 1999 (age 26). He is from Shaker Heights, Ohio, and auditioned for Boy Band as a rapping violinist with "A Little More" by Machine Gun Kelly. Like Tutton, Perez, and Ramos, he was never in danger of elimination.

In January 2019, Smith made a remix to "Lucky You" by Eminem (featuring Joyner Lucas). After the success of this initial remix, Smith released "Do or Die" in March 2019; the track contains a sample of "Morph" by Twenty One Pilots. Thomas Crane filmed and directed both videos, which were uploaded to YouTube. The audio version of the songs are available on Smith's SoundCloud. On October 27, 2020, he released his debut single "With You in Mind", where he talks about the Black Lives Matter movement.

== Discography ==
In Real Life discography
- Studio albums: 1
- Singles: 11
- Music videos: 7

The discography of In Real Life consists of one studio album, 11 singles, and 7 music videos.

=== Albums ===
- She Do (2019)

=== Singles ===
Title	Year	Peak chart positions	Album
Title	Year	US Pop	Album
"Eyes Closed"	2017	—	She Do
"Feel This Christmas / I'll Be Home for Christmas"	2017	-	Non-album single
"Tattoo (How 'Bout You)"	2018	29	She Do
"How Badly"	2018	-	She Do
"Tonight Belongs to You"	2018	-	She Do
"Got Me Good"	2018	-	She Do
"Crazy AF"	2019	40	She Do
"Somebody Like You"	2019	-	She Do
"Hurt for Long"	2019	-	She Do
"California Christmas"	2019	-	Non-album single
"—" denotes a recording that did not chart or was not released.

=== Music videos ===
- 2017: "Eyes Closed"
- 2017: "I'll Be Home For Christmas"
- 2018: "Tattoo (How 'Bout You)"
- 2018: "Tonight Belongs to You"
- 2019: "Crazy AF"
- 2019: "She Do"
- 2019: "Don't Go"
- 2019: "California Christmas"

== Filmography ==
Television

- Boy Band (2017)

== Tours ==
Headlining

- Tonight Belongs to You Tour (2018)
- For U Tour (2019)

Co Headlining

- American Idol Live! (2018)
