= Groovy Little Summer Song =

Single by James Otto

from the album Shake What God Gave Ya
- Released: March 8, 2010
- Genre: Country
- Length: 3:37
- Label: Warner Bros. Nashville
- Songwriters: Al Anderson, Carson Chamberlain, James Otto
- Producers: James Otto, Paul Worley

James Otto singles chronology
"Since You Brought It Up" (2009)	"Groovy Little Summer Song" (2010)	"Soldiers & Jesus" (2010)

"Groovy Little Summer Song" is a song co-written recorded by American country music artist James Otto. It was released in March 2010 as the first single from his album Shake What God Gave Ya. The song was written by Otto, Al Anderson and Carson Chamberlain.

== Critical reception ==
Karlie Justus of Engine 145 gave the song a thumbs-up rating. She said in her review that the song "breaks through the pack and delivers a self-aware, laid-back tune just as enjoyable as an SPF-covered day at the beach." Tara Seetharam of Country Universe gave "Groovy Little Summer Song" a B rating. Her review described the song as "an incredibly refreshing re-introduction to an artist who can deliver both rich, distinctive vocals and pure, raw sentiment."

== Chart performance ==
"Groovy Little Summer Song" debuted at number 54 on the Hot Country Songs chart dated March 27, 2010. It entered the Top 40 at number 39 on the country chart dated May 1, 2010, giving Otto his sixth Top 40 country hit, as well as his fifth consecutive. It is also his biggest hit since 2008's number 1 hit, "Just Got Started Lovin' You." The song peaked at number 26 in August 2010.

Chart (2010)	Peak position
US Hot Country Songs (Billboard)	26
