= Chase the Sun (Shannon Lawson album) =

Studio album by Shannon Lawson
- Released: June 4, 2002
- Studio: Javelina Recording Studios (Nashville, TN)
- Genre: Country
- Length: 43:24
- Label: MCA Nashville
- Producer: Mark Wright

Singles from Chase the Sun
- 1. "Goodbye on a Bad Day" Released: January 28, 2002; 2. "Dream Your Way to Me" Released: July 22, 2002

Professional ratings
Review scores
Source	Rating
AllMusic	3/5 stars
Entertainment Weekly	C+

Chase the Sun is the debut studio album by American country music artist Shannon Lawson. It was released in 2002 (see 2002 in country music) on the MCA Nashville label, and it produced two singles: "Dream Your Way to Me" and "Goodbye on a Bad Day", which respectively reached #45 and #28 on the Billboard country charts, while the album peaked at #35 on the Top Country Albums charts.

== History ==
When Lason was signed to MCA Nashville in 2002, he caught the attention of record producer Mark Wright, who was impressed with the range of material that Lawson had shown on his demo tape. Wright, then, decided to give Lawson "the freedom to experiment" in the studio, and the resulting album featured experimental instrumentation, such as on "This Old Heart", where Chris Thile of Nickel Creek played mandolin. Thile's mandolin was recorded through an amplifier, giving what Wright described as a "real crunchy sound, very different". Other songs on the album were described as "instrumentally driven". Also included was a cover of Marvin Gaye's "Let's Get It On", done here in a bluegrass style.

After the release of this album, Lawson was dropped from MCA Nashville. In 2004, he signed to Equity Music Group, a label owned by Clint Black. Although Lawson charted two singles on Equity, his second album was never released.

== Track listing ==
Chase the Sun track listing
No.	Title	Writer(s)	Length
1.	"This Old Heart"	Shannon Lawson; Del Gray	3:31
2.	"Chase the Sun"	Lawson; Bobby Taylor	2:56
3.	"Dream Your Way to Me"	Lawson; Tim Nichols	3:52
4.	"Goodbye on a Bad Day"	Lawson; Mark A. Peters	4:54
5.	"Bad Bad Bad"	Lawson; Gray	3:40
6.	"Superstar"	Lawson; Ben Hayslip	3:33
7.	"Where Would I Go"	Lawson; Steve Mandile	4:27
8.	"Who's Your Daddy"	Lawson; Austin Cunningham	3:32
9.	"Slow Down Sunrise"	Lawson; Gray	3:12
10.	"Are You Happy Now"	Lawson; Gray	4:05
11.	"Let's Get It On"	Marvin Gaye; Ed Townsend	4:33
12.	"(hidden track)"		1:09
Total length:			43:24

== Personnel ==
- Ron Block – banjo
- Bekka Bramlett – background vocals
- J. T. Corenflos – electric guitar
- Eric Darken – percussion
- Jerry Douglas – Dobro
- Dan Dugmore – acoustic guitar, pedal steel guitar
- Stuart Duncan – fiddle
- Kim Fleming – background vocals
- Pat Flynn – acoustic guitar, 12-string guitar, bouzouki
- Shannon Forrest – drums
- Andrew Gold – electric guitar, background vocals
- Kenny Greenberg – acoustic guitar, electric guitar
- Vicki Hampton – background vocals
- Jim Horn – horns
- John Jorgenson – electric guitar
- Shannon Lawson – lead vocals, acoustic guitar, electric guitar
- Sam Levine – horns
- Gene Miller – background vocals
- Steve Nathan – piano, keyboards, Hammond organ
- Michael Rhodes – bass guitar
- Dennis Solee – horns
- Harry Stinson – background vocals
- Russell Terrell – background vocals
- Chris Thile – mandolin

Strings performed by the Nashville String Machine, conducted and arranged by David Campbell.

== Charts ==
Chart (2002)	Peak position
U.S. Billboard Top Country Albums	35
U.S. Billboard Top Heatseekers	24
