= Samaritan's Feet =

US non-profit organization

- Founders: Emmanuel "Manny" and Tracie Ohonme
- Type: Non-profit NGO
- Purpose: Shoes
- Location(s): 4808 Chesapeake Dr. Charlotte, NC 282176
- Region served: Worldwide
- Method: Shoe Distributions
- Key people: Emmanuel "Manny" Ohonme (Co-Founder and President); Tracie Ohonme (Co-Founder)
- Website: samaritansfeet.org

Samaritan's Feet, based in Charlotte, North Carolina, is a 501(c)(3) nonprofit organization that "shares a message of hope and love through washing the feet of impoverished children around the world and adorning them with new shoes." Founded by Emmanuel "Manny" and Tracie Ohonme in 2003, Samaritan's Feet has distributed over 9.4 million pairs of shoes in over 560 U.S. cities and in 109 different countries since its inception.

== History ==
Manny Ohonme was born and raised in Lagos, Nigeria. After winning a contest put on by Christian missionaries from Wisconsin, he earned himself "his first ever pair of shoes" at 9 years of age, as well hope and inspiration for his future.

With both of these new possessions, he honed his skills in basketball to be recruited to play on a full athletic scholarship in America at the University of North Dakota- Lake Region for the men's basketball team, allowing him to earn both his bachelor's and master's degrees.

After years of success in America's technology sector, he returned home to Nigeria and was moved after seeing many children living without shoes. In 2003, he and his wife Tracie formed Samaritan's Feet.

Since then, Samaritan's Feet has achieved an overall Four Star ranking from Charity Navigator, the highest ranking possible. 91% of the organization's expenses go towards distributing shoes worldwide, with 8.6% being used for fundraising efforts and 5.6% being reserved for administrative salaries.

The organization saw a significant increase in revenue during 2013 and was able to cover all expenses for the year for the first time in at least four years.

== Efforts ==
=== Shoes of Hope ===
Shoes of Hope is Samaritan's Feet's primary effort for distributing shoes and socks both domestically and internationally. In addition to giving away footwear, the program also features volunteers washing the feet of the recipient and talking with them about "their dreams and their lives." During 2013, the Shoes of Hope campaign was responsible for distributing 15,864 pairs of shoes and socks in the United States alone, followed a year later by 17,566 worldwide. Within the Shoes of Hope program, there are specific efforts for both domestic and international missions.

==== In the United States ====
During the 2013 holiday season, Samaritan's Feet partnered with the University of California, Los Angeles' women's basketball team to donate over 500 pairs of new shoes and socks to the students of Rosemont Avenue Elementary School in the Los Angeles Unified School District. Between October 2014 and April 2015, Indiana's credit unions and Samaritan's Feet partnered to distribute over 1000 pairs of shoes across the state of Indiana. On October 11, 2015, University of Central Arkansas athletes partnered with Samaritan's Feet to distribute over 300 pairs of shoes to children in need in Conway, Arkansas. On October 18, 2015, Samaritan's Feet partnered with four athletic teams from the University of Mary to serve over 400 children in Bismarck, North Dakota with new shoes and socks.

In 2017, the Foundation of the Carolinas awarded Samaritan's Feet with a $20,000 grant. Students at Sherwood Park Elementary School (all 425 students), J.W. Coon Elementary School and Mary McArthur Elementary School received new shoes.

===== Back to School =====
Each year during the months of July through September, Samaritan's Feet focuses their domestic operations on preparing school-aged children for school by providing new shoes and socks for the upcoming academic year. In 2013, Samaritan's Feet provided almost 24,000 children with new footwear, as well as inspiration and encouragement for their upcoming studies. This number increased to nearly 34,000 during the 2014 campaign. On August 9, 2015, Samaritan's Feet distributed over 200 pairs of shoes to children in Columbia, South Carolina as a part of their 2015 "Back to School" campaign.

==== International Mission Trips ====
In 2013, Samaritan's Feet was responsible for distributing over 1,031,000 pairs of shoes and socks worldwide, including 106,864 in Burundi, 27,016 in the Dominican Republic, 26,316 in El Salvador, 26,316 in Ethiopia, 26,344 in Guatemala, 52,932 in Guyana, 33,085 in Haiti, 106,885 in Honduras, 26,466 in Jamaica, 26,316 in Jordan, 26,316 in Liberia, 26,316 in Mozambique, 27,481 in Nicaragua, 34,685 in the Philippines, 105,689 in South Africa, 26,316 in Tanzania, 79,055 in Uganda and 26,466 in Zimbabwe.

During the 2009 edition of Taylor University's Silent Night, students donated over 400 pairs of shoes that were later distributed by Taylor students working with Samaritan's Feet in five communities in the Dominican Republic during their 2010 spring break.

== Partners ==
- Dale Brown, former head coach of the Louisiana State University men's basketball team
- Matt Brown, former head coach of the University of Missouri-Kansas City men's basketball team
- University of California, Los Angeles' women's basketball team
- John Calipari, head coach of the University of Kentucky men's basketball team
- Cori Close, head coach of the University of California, Los Angeles' women's basketball team
- College Sports Information Directors of America (CoSIDA)
- Homer Drew, associate athletic director at Valparaiso University
- Duke University
- Damien Horne, writer and recorder of Samaritan's Feet's theme song
- Ron Hunter, head coach of the Georgia State University men's basketball team
- Ernie Johnson, sportscaster
- Jeff Jones, head coach of Old Dominion University men's basketball team
- Keuka College's women's basketball team
- Michael Kidd-Gilchrist, forward for the Charlotte Hornets
- Alan Major, former head coach of the University of North Carolina at Charlotte men's basketball team
- University of Mary
- Scott Nagy, head coach of the Wright State University men's basketball team
- Northern Arizona University's women's basketball team
- Saul Phillips, head coach of the Ohio University men's basketball team
- Queens University of Charlotte's women's basketball team
- David Richman, head coach of the North Dakota State University men's basketball team
- Sue Semrau, head coach of the Florida State University women's basketball team
- Steve Smith, former wide receiver for the Carolina Panthers and Baltimore Ravens
- Taylor University's men's basketball team
