= Boy Band (TV series) =

- Genre: Reality television
- Presented by: Rita Ora
- Judges: Nick Carter; Emma Bunton; Timbaland
- Country of origin: United States
- Original language: English
- No. of seasons: 1
- No. of episodes: 10

Production
- Production company: Matador Content

Original release
- Network: ABC
- Release: June 22 – August 24, 2017

Boy Band is an American television music competition series that premiered on June 22, 2017, on ABC. The 10-episode first season features young male vocalists competing to become a member of a new five-piece boy band. The final five boys who form the boy band receive a recording contract with Hollywood Records and perform the band's debut single during the finale. On August 24, 2017, it was announced on the live show that Brady Tutton, Chance Perez, Drew Ramos, Sergio Calderon, and Michael Conor were the new members of the boy band, In Real Life. They performed for the very first time their first single, "Eyes Closed".

Rita Ora hosted the first series, with the Backstreet Boys' Nick Carter, the Spice Girls' Emma Bunton and Timbaland serving as the "architects" who helped guide the contestants throughout the series.

== Contestants ==
ABC released the list of the 30 contestants on June 9, 2017.

| Name | Age | Hometown | Status |
|---|---|---|---|
| Sergio Calderon | 16 | Redwood City, California | Winners |
| Brady Tutton | 15 | Shorewood, Wisconsin | Winners |
| Michael Conor Smith | 18 | Cleveland, Ohio | Winners |
| Chance Perez | 19 | Seal Beach, California | Winners |
| Drew Ramos | 19 | Bronx, New York | Winners |
| Jaden Gray | 16 | Hawthorne, California | Eliminated Ep. 10 |
| Mikey Jimenez | 17 | East Los Angeles, California | Eliminated Ep. 10 |
| Marcus Pendleton | 16 | Nashville, Tennessee | Eliminated Ep. 10 |
| Devin Hayes | 17/18 | Springfield, Illinois | Eliminated Ep. 8 |
| Jay "J Hype" Gilbert | 14 | Las Vegas, Nevada | Eliminated Ep. 7 |
| Andrew Bloom | 19/20 | Yorba Linda, California | Eliminated Ep. 7 |
| Camry Jackson | 19 | Willingboro, New Jersey | Eliminated Ep. 6 |
| Andrew Butcher | 17 | Memphis, Tennessee | Eliminated Ep. 6 |
| Dorian Tyler | 15 | Memphis, Tennessee | Eliminated Ep. 5 |
| Miles Wesley | 20 | Marble Falls, Texas | Eliminated Ep. 4 |
| Gavin Becker | 18 | Philadelphia, Pennsylvania | Eliminated Ep. 3 |
| Jon Klaasen | 19 | Greenwood, Indiana | Eliminated Ep. 2 |
| Cameron Armstrong | 22 | Columbia, South Carolina | Eliminated Ep. 1 |
| Alan Ayala | 19 | Monterrey, Mexico | Eliminated Ep. 1 |
| Gianni Cardinale | 16/17 | Las Vegas, Nevada | Eliminated Ep. 1 |
| Santino Cardinale | 18 | Las Vegas, Nevada | Eliminated Ep. 1 |
| Matthew Dean | 19 | Thousand Oaks, California | Eliminated Ep. 1 |
| Jordan Grizzle | 22 | Fort Lauderdale, Florida | Eliminated Ep. 1 |
| Lukas James | 15 | Sarasota, Florida | Eliminated Ep. 1 |
| Stone Martin | 18 | Hartsville, South Carolina | Eliminated Ep. 1 |
| Dylan Rey | 17 | Plano, Texas | Eliminated Ep. 1 |
| Zack Taylor | 24 | Kansas City, Missouri | Eliminated Ep. 1 |
| Timmy Thames | 17 | Malibu, California | Eliminated Ep. 1 |
| Paul Toweh | 21 | Monrovia, Liberia | Eliminated Ep. 1 |
| Nate Wyatt | 20 | Cincinnati, Ohio | Eliminated Ep. 1 |

=== Progress chart ===
| Contestant | 1 | 2 | 3 | 4 | 5 | 6 | 7 | 8 | 9 | 10 |
|---|---|---|---|---|---|---|---|---|---|---|
| Brady Tutton | SAFE | Reverb | | TR5BLE | Next up | All In | Relentless | Never Gone | SAFE | In Real Life |
| Chance Perez | SAFE | Reverb | | Top Line | Timeless | All In | Awake | Third Wheel | SAFE | In Real Life |
| Drew Ramos | Uplift | | | Top Line | Maxed | Undivided | Awake | Out of Control | SAFE | In Real Life |
| Michael Conor Smith | SAFE | | Six Track | Top Line | Timeless | Leveled | Relentless | Third Wheel | SAFE | In Real Life |
| Sergio Calderon | Uplift | | | Top Line | Maxed | All In | New Wave | Never Gone | SAFE | In Real Life |
| Jaden Gray | SAFE | Reverb | | Element | Next Up | Undivided | Relentless | Out of Control | SAFE | ELIM |
| Marcus Pendleton | Uplift | | | TR5BLE | Timeless | All In | New Wave | Third Wheel | SAFE | ELIM |
| Mikey Jimenez | SAFE | | Six Track | Top Line | Next Up | All In | New Wave | Out of Control | SAFE | ELIM |
| Devin Hayes | Uplift | | | Element | Maxed | Undivided | Awake | Never Gone | | |
| Andrew Bloom | SAFE | Reverb | | Element | Timeless | Leveled | Relentless | | | |
| Jay "J Hype" Gilbert | Uplift | | | Element | Maxed | Leveled | New Wave | | | |
| Andrew Butcher | SAFE | | Six Track | TR5BLE | Timeless | Undivided | | | | |
| Cam Jackson | SAFE | Reverb | | TR5BLE | Maxed | Leveled | | | | |
| Dorian Tyler | SAFE | | Six Track | TR5BLE | Next Up | | | | | |
| Miles Wesley | SAFE | | Six Track | Element | | | | | | |
| Gavin Becker | SAFE | | Six Track | | | | | | | |
| Jon Klaasen | SAFE | Reverb | | | | | | | | |
| Cameron Armstrong | Uplift | | | | | | | | | |
| Alan Ayala | ELIM | | | | | | | | | |
| Dylan Rey | ELIM | | | | | | | | | |
| Gianni Cardinale | ELIM | | | | | | | | | |
| Jordan Grizzle | ELIM | | | | | | | | | |
| Lukas James | ELIM | | | | | | | | | |
| Matthew Dean | ELIM | | | | | | | | | |
| Nate Wyatt | ELIM | | | | | | | | | |
| Paul Toweh | ELIM | | | | | | | | | |
| Santino Cardinale | ELIM | | | | | | | | | |
| Stone Martin | ELIM | | | | | | | | | |
| Timmy Thames | ELIM | | | | | | | | | |
| Zack Taylor | ELIM | | | | | | | | | |

Top 5 Winner
The group won the challenge.
The contestant was in the bottom two or three.
The contestant was eliminated.

== Episodes ==
| No. | Title | Original release date | Prod. code | U.S. viewers (millions) |
|---|---|---|---|---|
| 1 | "Meet the Boys" | June 22, 2017 | 101 | 2.995 |
Thirty young male vocalist audition before the three judges, labeled as architects, and 18 are selected to advance to the next round. The judges separate the remaining 18 boys into three groups to perform. After each performance, a member from each group will be eliminated. In this episode, the group Uplift perform and Cameron Armstrong is eliminated. Group Performances: That's What I Like
| 2 | "Who's Got the Right Stuff" | June 29, 2017 | 102 | 2.645 |
The group Reverb perform before the three judges and Jon Klaasen is eliminated. Group Performances: Stay
| 3 | "Sweet Sixteen" | July 6, 2017 | 103 | 2.729 |
The group Six Track perform before the three judges and Gavin Becker is eliminated. Group Performances: There's Nothing Holdin' Me Back
| 4 | "Live Live Live!" | July 13, 2017 | 104 | 2.441 |
The remaining 15 contestants are separated into three groups: Top Line, TR5BLE and Element. The groups perform before the three judges and TR5BLE is chosen as the "safe" group such that none of their members are up for elimination in this round. Mikey Jimenez from Top Line and Miles Wesley from Element are up for elimination. The audience votes and Miles is eliminated. Group Performances: Despacito, Rolling in the Deep, Don't Let Me Down
| 5 | "Blast from the Past" | July 20, 2017 | 105 | 2.236 |
Group Performances: Livin' on a Prayer, True Colors, Can't Take My Eyes Off You
| 6 | "Soundtrack Hits" | July 27, 2017 | 106 | 2.388 |
Group Performances: How Far I'll Go, I Don't Want to Miss a Thing, See You Again
| 7 | "Break Up Week!" | August 3, 2017 | 107 | 2.312 |
Group Performances: Since U Been Gone, Without You, Jealous
| 8 | "Girl Power!" | August 10, 2017 | 108 | 2.302 |
Group Performances: Titanium, Fighter, The Edge of Glory
| 9 | "America, It's Decision Time!" | August 17, 2017 | 109 | 2.134 |
| 10 | "Top Five Revealed!" | August 24, 2017 | 110 | 2.399 |

== Contestants who appeared on other shows ==
- Chance Perez auditioned for season 11 of America's Got Talent as a member of the band "The WVKE". They were buzzed by Howie Mandel and Heidi Klum, and were heavily criticized by Simon Cowell, ultimately not passing through the audition. Chance later appeared as the character Javier Garcia, the Black Ranger, in Power Rangers Dino Fury and Power Rangers Cosmic Fury.
- Stone Martin, Timmy Thames, and Jon Klaasen all appeared on the third season of The X Factor USA, with Martin and Thames competing as soloists and Klaasen as a member of Forever In Your Mind. They were all eliminated during the Four Chair Challenge. Klaasen also appeared on season 15 of American Idol, making it to the top 50.
- Andrew Bloom previously auditioned for Seasons 14 and 15 of American Idol.
- Zack Taylor previously auditioned for Season 14 of American Idol under the name Zack Kaltenbach, making it to the top 48.
- Cameron Armstrong appeared on the third season of Ex on the Beach.
- Brady Tutton appeared as Brock on the American sitcom show Fresh Off the Boat.
