= Just Got Started Lovin' You =

Single by James Otto

from the album Sunset Man
- Released: July 3, 2007
- Genre: Country
- Length: 3:54
- Label: Raybaw; Warner Bros. Nashville
- Songwriters: James Otto; Jim Femino; D. Vincent Williams
- Producers: John Rich; James Otto

James Otto singles chronology
"Sunday Morning and Saturday Night" (2004)	"Just Got Started Lovin' You" (2007)	"For You" (2008)

"Just Got Started Lovin' You" is a song co-written and recorded by American country music artist James Otto. It was released in July 2007 as the first single from his album Sunset Man. On the Hot Country Songs chart dated for May 17, 2008, the song has also become Otto's first (and to date, his only) number-one hit. The song was also the number one song on Billboard's year-end 2008 Hot Country Songs chart.

== Background and writing ==
The song originated when James Otto contacted his friend, songwriter Jim Femino, while Femino and D. Vincent Williams were grocery shopping in Nashville, Tennessee. Otto expressed his interest in collaborating on a song, and Femino suggested including Williams, who had not previously met Otto.

The three met at Williams's house, where Williams remarked on the "sex appeal" in Otto's musical style, drawing a comparison to Conway Twitty. Williams developed a melody that he recorded on his computer; upon hearing it, Otto felt it conveyed a "sexy" quality and was inspired to create lyrics to match, ultimately arriving at the title "Just Got Started Lovin' You". The group recorded a work tape, which they presented to singer and producer John Rich (of Big & Rich), who selected the song as the lead single for Otto's album Sunset Man.

Musically, the song is set in the key of G major, has a tempo of approximately 92 beats per minute, and is written in common time (4/4 time signature). The chord progression for the verses follows G–Am^{7}–C–D–G.

== Critical reception ==
Kevin John Coyne of Country Universe gave the song a B grade, calling it "a smooth but not sappy romantic ballad." He also said that he isn't "reinventing the wheel, but he sounds comfortable and self-assured."

== Music video ==
The music video was directed by Ryan Smith and was filmed on November 26, 2007.

== Chart performance ==
Chart (2007–2008)	Peak position
US Hot Country Songs (Billboard)	1
US Billboard Hot 100	27
US Billboard Pop 100	65
Canada Hot 100 (Billboard)	71

=== Year-end charts ===
Chart (2008)	Position
US Country Songs (Billboard)	1
Canada Country (Billboard)	7
