= For U Tour =

2019 concert tour by In Real Life

- Tour by In Real Life
- Promotional poster for US leg of the tour
- Associated album: She Do
- Start date: October 2, 2019
- End date: October 29, 2019
- Legs: 1
- No. of shows: 14

In Real Life concert chronology
- Tonight Belongs to You Tour (2018); For U Tour (2019)

The For U Tour was the second and last headlining concert tour by American boyband In Real Life, in support of their first studio album, She Do (2019). The tour began on October 2, 2019, in Cleveland, and concluded on October 29, 2019, in Seattle.

== Background and development ==
On August 24, 2019, In Real Life announced they would be embarking on their second headlining tour. Dates were announced on August 26. Jenna Raine was announce as the opening act with Asher Angel and Elle Winter also opening on selected dates.

== Tour dates ==
Date	City	Country	Venue	Opening act
North America
October 2, 2019	Cleveland	United States	The Cambridge Room	Elle Winter; Asher Angel; Jenna Raine
October 3, 2019	Denver	United States	Lost Lake Lounge	Elle Winter; Asher Angel; Jenna Raine
October 5, 2019	Los Angeles	United States	The Roxy	Elle Winter; Asher Angel; Jenna Raine
October 7, 2019	New York City	United States	Gramercy Theatre	Elle Winter; Asher Angel; Jenna Raine
October 13, 2019	Phoenix	United States	Valley Bar	Elle Winter; Asher Angel; Jenna Raine
October 14, 2019	Chicago	United States	Lincoln Hall	Elle Winter; Jenna Raine
October 16, 2019	Boston	United States	Sonia	Elle Winter; Jenna Raine
October 18, 2019	Orlando	United States	The Social	Jenna Raine
October 20, 2019	Dallas	United States	The Cambridge Room	Jenna Raine
October 22, 2019	Atlanta	United States	Aisle 5	Jenna Raine
October 23, 2019	Washington, D.C.	United States	Union Stage	Jenna Raine
October 25, 2019	Cincinnati	United States	Top Cats	Jenna Raine
October 27, 2019	Oakland	United States	The New Parish	Jenna Raine
October 29, 2019	Seattle	United States	Columbia City Theater	Jenna Raine
