= Goodbye on a Bad Day =

Single by Shannon Lawson

from the album Chase the Sun
- B-side: "Are You Happy Now"
- Released: January 28, 2002
- Genre: Country
- Length: 4:54
- Label: MCA Nashville
- Songwriter(s): Shannon Lawson, Mark A. Peters
- Producer(s): Mark Wright

Shannon Lawson singles chronology
"Goodbye on a Bad Day" (2002)	"Dream Your Way to Me" (2002)

"Goodbye on a Bad Day" is a debut song co-written and recorded by American country music artist Shannon Lawson. It was released on January 28, 2002 as the first single from the album Chase the Sun. The song reached #28 on the Billboard Hot Country Singles & Tracks chart. The song was written by Lawson and Mark A. Peters.

== Critical reception ==
Deborah Evans Price of Billboard reviewed the song favorably. She described Lawson's vocal as "letting disappointment drip...like icy regret" before "totally unleashing" on the chorus. Price's review also praised the lyrics and "deft production".

== Chart performance ==
Chart (2002)	Peak position
US Hot Country Songs (Billboard)	28

== Release history ==
Release dates and format(s) for "Goodbye on a Bad Day"
Region	Date	Format(s)	Label(s)	Ref.
United States	January 28, 2002	Country radio	MCA Nashville	
