= Caryl Mack Parker =

American singer-songwriter

- Also known as: Caryl Parker
- Born: Abilene, Texas, U.S.
- Genres: Country
- Occupation: Singer-songwriter
- Instruments: Guitar, piano
- Years active: 1984–present
- Labels: Magnatone
- Website: Official website

Caryl Mack Parker (born in Abilene, Texas) is an Americana singer-songwriter. Between 1996 and 1997, Parker charted two singles on the Billboard Hot Country Singles & Tracks chart.

Alanna Nash of Entertainment Weekly, wrote that Parker "this West Texas native conjures inventive images and dispenses sage advice."

As a staff-writer for Warner/Chappell Music, Hamstein and Scream Music, her songs were recorded by artists such as Patty Loveless and for television shows such as The West Wing. Parker has worked as a session vocalist, songwriter and accompanist with such artists as Vince Gill, Trisha Yearwood, Amy Grant, James Otto, Kevin Welch, Jimmy Hall, Ashley Cleveland, Kim Hill, Jude Cole and Will Hoge. She has also appeared at numerous songwriter festivals and venues in Nashville, including the Ryman Auditorium and Bluebird Cafe.

Caryl is married to producer/publisher/songwriter, Scott Parker. The couple currently lives in Nashville, Tennessee.

== Discography ==
=== Albums ===
Title	Album details
Caryl Mack	Release date: 1984; Label: Private press
Smoke & Mirrors	Release date: 1993; Label: Cascot Music
Caryl Mack Parker	Release date: December 3, 1996; Label: Magnatone Records
Alabaster Boxes	Release date: October 15, 2007; Label: Rancho Divine
Rancho Divine	Release date: June 13, 2008; Label: Rancho Divine
Vendange: The Lost Thelma’s Sessions, Vol. 1	Release date: September 18, 2020; Label: Rancho Divine
Rustique: The Lost Thelma’s Sessions, Vol. 2	Release date: September 25, 2020; Label: Rancho Divine
La Trouvaille: The Lost Thelma’s Sessions, Vol. 3	Release date: October 23, 2020; Label: Rancho Divine
Mercy Road	Release date: February 12, 2021; Label: Rancho Divine
Christmas Caryl	Release date: November 7, 2023; Label: Rancho Divine
The Firepit Sessions	Release date: January 26, 2024; Label: Rancho Divine
Watching Life	Release date: April 19, 2024; Label: Rancho Divine

=== Singles ===
Year	Single	Peak positions	Album
Year	Single	US Country	Album
1996	"Better Love Next Time"	67	Caryl Mack Parker
1997	"One Night Stand"	66	Caryl Mack Parker
1997	"It's Good to Be Me"	—	Caryl Mack Parker
2019	"Stay"	—	Mercy Road
2019	"Beautiful"	—	Mercy Road
2019	"Mercy Road"	—	Mercy Road
2020	"Landed On Love"	—	Mercy Road
2020	"Night Train to Lonely"	—	Mercy Road
2023	"Harvest Moon (Live)"	—	The Firepit Sessions
2023	"Home (Live from the Firepit)"	—	The Firepit Sessions
2024	"Can't Let Go (Live)"	—	The Firepit Sessions
"—" denotes releases that did not chart

=== Music videos ===
Year	Video
1996	"Better Love Next Time"
1997	"One Night Stand"
2019	"Mercy Road"
2020	"Landed On Love"
2020	"Night Train to Lonely"
2021	"Beautiful"
2024	"Watching Life"
