= Tonight Belongs to You Tour =

2018 concert tour by In Real Life

Tonight Belongs To You Tour
- Tour by In Real Life
- Promotional poster for US leg of the tour
- Start date: September 9, 2018
- End date: November 11, 2018
- Legs: 2
- No. of shows: 27

In Real Life concert chronology
- Tonight Belongs to You Tour (2018); For U Tour (2019)

The Tonight Belongs to You Tour was the first headlining concert tour by American boy band In Real Life. The tour began on September 9, 2018, in Silver Spring, and concluded November 11, 2018, in Cebu City.

== Background and development ==
On June 4, 2018, In Real Life announced they would be embarking on a 15-date North American tour. JAGMAC and Spencer Sutherland were announced as opening acts. In August, more North American dates were added. That same month, six dates in the Philippines were announced.

== Setlist ==
This setlist is representative of the show on September 12, 2018, in Boston. It does not represent all the shows from the tour.

1. "Eyes Closed"
2. "How Badly"
3. "Motownphilly" / "I Want It That Way" / "Bye Bye Bye" / "Glad You Came" / "Burnin' Up / "What Makes You Beautiful"
4. "Amnesia"
5. "Mirrors"
6. "Viva la Vida"
7. "Someone Like You"
8. "Got Me Good"
9. Freestyle rap
10. "Familiar"
11. "Sweet Creature"
12. "Stay"
13. "Beautiful"
14. "Tattoo (How 'Bout You)"
15. "Drag Me Down"
16. "Tonight Belongs to You"
17. "The Show Goes On"

== Tour dates ==
Date	City	Country	Venue	Opening act
North America
September 9, 2018	Silver Spring	United States	The Fillmore Silver Spring	JAGMAC; Spencer Sutherland
September 10, 2018	New York City	United States	Irving Plaza	JAGMAC; Spencer Sutherland
September 12, 2018	Boston	United States	Paradise Rock Club	JAGMAC; Spencer Sutherland
September 13, 2018	Philadelphia	United States	Theatre of Living Arts	JAGMAC; Spencer Sutherland
September 15, 2018	Cincinnati	United States	Bogart's	JAGMAC; Spencer Sutherland
September 16, 2018	Cleveland	United States	Cambridge Room	JAGMAC; Spencer Sutherland
September 18, 2018	Detroit	United States	The Shelter	JAGMAC; Spencer Sutherland
September 19, 2018	Louisville	United States	Mercury Ballroom	JAGMAC; Spencer Sutherland
September 21, 2018	Chicago	United States	House of Blues	JAGMAC; Spencer Sutherland
September 22, 2018	Minneapolis	United States	Varsity Theatre	JAGMAC; Spencer Sutherland
September 24, 2018	Denver	United States	Marquis Theater	JAGMAC; Spencer Sutherland
September 26, 2018	San Diego	United States	House of Blues	JAGMAC; Spencer Sutherland
September 27, 2018	Los Angeles	United States	The Troubadour	JAGMAC; Spencer Sutherland
September 28, 2018	Anaheim	United States	The Parish	JAGMAC; Spencer Sutherland
October 1, 2018	Dallas	United States	Cambridge Room	JAGMAC; Spencer Sutherland
October 2, 2018	Houston	United States	Bronze Peacock	JAGMAC; Spencer Sutherland
October 4, 2018	Indianapolis	United States	Deluxe	JAGMAC; Spencer Sutherland
October 6, 2018	Charleston	United States	Music Farm	JAGMAC; Spencer Sutherland
October 7, 2018	Charlotte	United States	The Underground	JAGMAC; Spencer Sutherland
October 8, 2018	Atlanta	United States	Aisle 5	JAGMAC; Spencer Sutherland
October 10, 2018	Orlando	United States	The Social	JAGMAC; Spencer Sutherland
Asia
May 23, 2019	Pasay	Philippines	SM Mall of Asia	JAGMAC; Spencer Sutherland
November 7, 2018	Pasay	Philippines	SM Mall of Asia	JAGMAC; Spencer Sutherland
November 8, 2018	Pasig	Philippines	SM Megamall	JAGMAC; Spencer Sutherland
November 9, 2018	Taguig City	Philippines	SM Aura Premier	JAGMAC; Spencer Sutherland
November 10, 2018	Manila	Philippines	SM City North EDSA	JAGMAC; Spencer Sutherland
November 11, 2018	Cebu City	Philippines	SM City Cebu	JAGMAC; Spencer Sutherland
