= Days of Our Lives (James Otto album) =

Studio album by James Otto
- Released: March 9, 2004
- Recorded: 2003 at Thelma's East Studio, Nashville, TN
- Genre: Country
- Length: 49:40
- Label: Mercury Nashville
- Producer: Greg Droman; Scott Parker; Mark Wright

James Otto chronology
Days of Our Lives (2004)	Sunset Man (2008)

Singles from Days of Our Lives
- 1. "The Ball" Released: 2002; 2. "Days of Our Lives" Released: 2003; 3. "Sunday Morning and Saturday Night" Released: 2004

Days of Our Lives is the debut studio album by American country music artist James Otto. It was released in 2004 on Mercury Nashville Records, and its title track was a Top 40 hit on the Billboard Hot Country Singles & Tracks (now Hot Country Songs) charts.

== Content ==
The track "The Last Thing I Do" was also recorded by Brooks & Dunn on their 2001 album Steers & Stripes, and by Montgomery Gentry (under the title "If It's the Last Thing I Do") on their 2004 album You Do Your Thing. "Long Way Down" was also recorded by Andy Griggs on his 2008 album The Good Life.

The album was originally slated for a 2003 release, but due to its initial single underperforming on the charts, its release was withheld until 2004.

== Critical reception ==
Professional ratings
Review scores
Source	Rating
Country Standard Time	mixed
People	mixed

Robert Loy of Country Standard Time gave the album a mixed review, criticizing derivative lyrics on the title track, "Misspent Youth", "She Knows", and "The Ball", while praising those of "The Violin Song". He also described Otto as having a "nice baritone", while noting the performances on "Gone" and "If It's the Last Thing I Do" in particular. An uncredited review in People was also mixed towards the album's lyrical content, criticizing the title track while complimenting "The Ball" and "Lowdown on the High Life". The same review also noted that "Musically, the bluesier Otto gets, the better he sounds."

== Track listing ==
No.	Title	Writer(s)	Length
1.	"Long Way Down"	Craig Wiseman, C. Michael Spriggs	4:51
2.	"Gone"	Kevin Brandt, Bobby Terry	3:41
3.	"Misspent Youth"	James Otto, C. J. Watson	5:09
4.	"Miss Temptation"	Caryl Mack Parker, Scott Parker, Billy Crain	3:57
5.	"Sunday Morning and Saturday Night"	Tim Nichols, Jeffrey Steele	3:52
6.	"Song of the Violin"	Otto	3:36
7.	"She Knows"	Bob Regan, Monty Criswell	3:43
8.	"Days of Our Lives"	Otto, Terry	3:51
9.	"The Last Thing I Do"	David Lee Murphy, Kim Tribble	3:46
10.	"The Ball"	Otto, Kerry Kurt Phillips, Patrick Jason Matthews	3:58
11.	"Lowdown on the Highlife"	Otto, Porter Howell, Kris Bergsnes	4:10
12.	"Never Say Goodbye"	Otto, Jody Alan Sweet	5:00

== Personnel ==
Adapted from Days of Our Lives liner notes.

Musicians

- Bekka Bramlett - background vocals (9)
- Steve Brewster - drums (4)
- Mike Brignardello - bass guitar (all tracks except 6)
- Etta Britt - background vocals (12)
- Pat Buchanan - electric guitar (1, 3–6, 10, 11), baritone guitar (11), electric resonator guitar (11), acoustic guitar (12), lap steel guitar (12)
- Tom Bukovac - electric guitar (all tracks except 6), acoustic guitar (11)
- Vickie Carrico - background vocals (1, 4, 5, 12)
- Eric Darken - percussion (2, 7, 8, 9)
- Daisy Dern - background vocals (11)
- Dan Dugmore - steel guitar (2, 3, 4, 7–11), Dobro (2, 7)
- Shannon Forrest - drums (2, 7, 8, 9), percussion (2, 7)
- Lisa Germano - strings (4)
- Tony Harrell - piano (1, 5)
- Wes Hightower - background vocals (2, 7, 8)
- Rob Ickes - Dobro (6)
- Chuck Leavell - piano (6, 12)
- Ken Lewis - percussion (4, 6, 10, 11, 12)
- B. James Lowry - acoustic guitar (2, 7, 8, 9)
- Brent Mason - electric guitar (7, 8)
- Greg Morrow - drums (1, 3, 5, 6, 10, 11, 12)
- Nashville String Machine - strings (7, 8)
- Steve Nathan - piano (2, 8), Hammond B-3 organ (7, 9), keyboards (9)
- Greg Otarski - tambourine (1, 5)
- James Otto - lead vocals (all tracks), background vocals (1), acoustic guitar (3, 5, 6)
- Caryl Mack Parker - background vocals (1, 4, 5, 6, 12)
- Alison Prestwood - bass guitar (6)
- Chris Stapleton - background vocals (9)
- Bryan Sutton - acoustic guitar (2, 6, 9), mandolin (6, 7, 8), banjo (7)
- Russell Terrell - background vocals (2)
- Dennis Wage - Hammond B-3 organ (1, 3, 4, 5, 10, 11, 12), keyboards (3)
- Jonathan Yudkin - fiddle (6)

String section on Track 6

- Darius Campo, Sara Parkins, Michelle Richards, Mark Robertson, John Wittenberg - violins
- Bob Becker, Evan Wilson - violas
- Larry Corbett, Suzie Katayama - cellos

=== Technical ===
All tracks except 2, 7, 8, and 9

- Richard Barrow - recording (track 4)
- David Campbell - string arrangements (track 6)
- Steve Churchyard - string recording (track 6)
- Joel Derouin - concertmaster (track 6)
- Adam D. Hatley - assistant, recording
- Dino Herrmann - assistant
- Bryan McConkey - assistant
- Sang Park - assistant
- Scott Parker - producer, recording
- Tom Sweeney - assistant
- Brian David Willis - recording, mixing
- Paul Worley - executive producer

Tracks 2, 7, 8, and 9 only

- Greg Droman - producer, recording, mixing
- Todd Gunnerson - assistant
- Kris Wilkinson - string arrangement (tracks 7, 8)
- Mark Wright - producer

== Chart performance ==
=== Album ===
Chart (2004)	Peak position
U.S. Billboard Top Country Albums	61

=== Singles ===
Year	Single	Peak chart positions
Year	Single	US Country
2002	"The Ball"	45
2003	"Days of Our Lives"	33
2004	"Sunday Morning and Saturday Night"	58
"—" denotes releases that did not chart
