= Gavin Becker =

American musician and actor (born 1999)

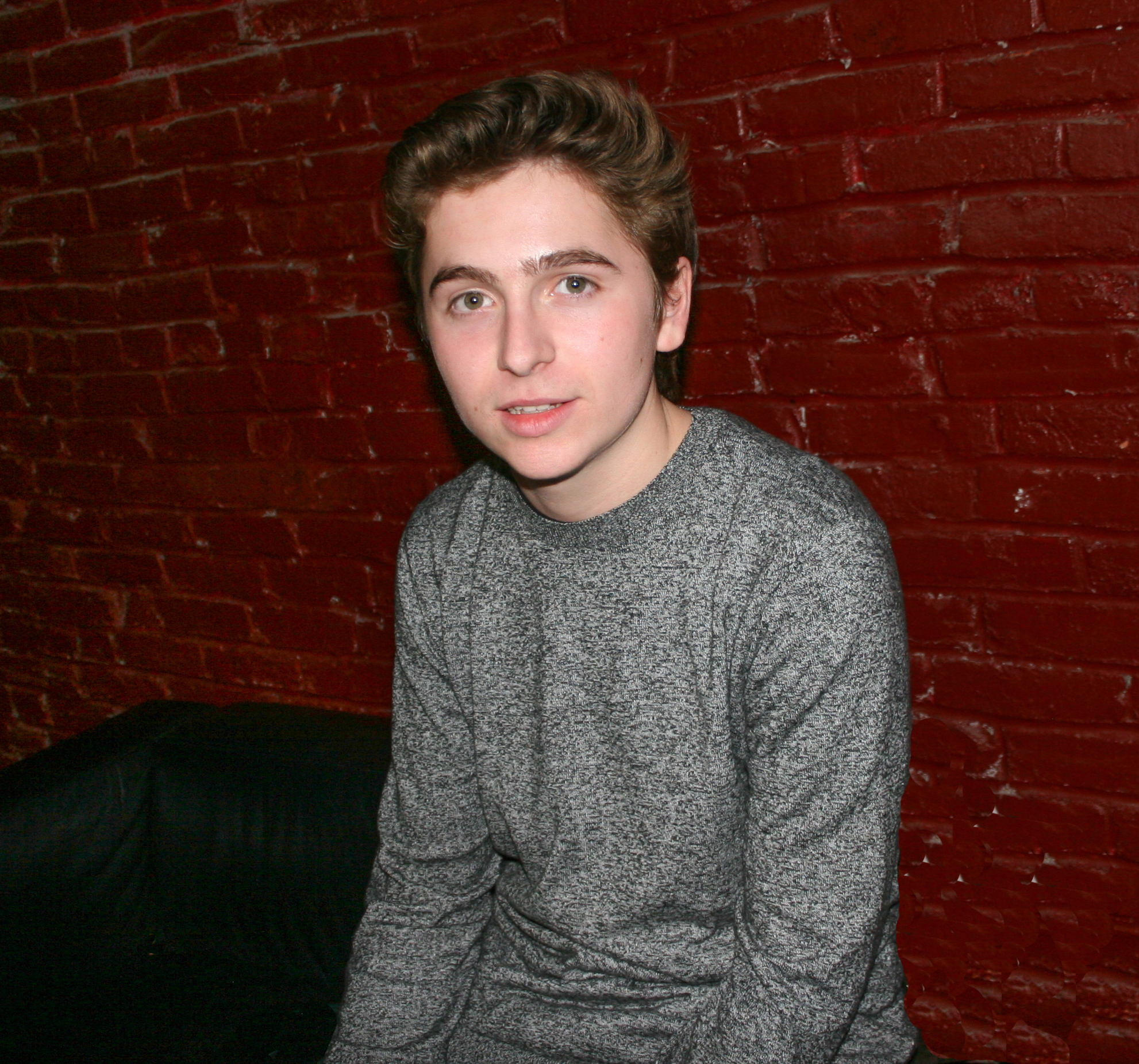
- Becker in 2016

Background information
- Born: Gavin Becker; January 15, 1999 (age 27); Philadelphia, US
- Genre: Pop
- Occupations: Singer; songwriter; actor
- Instruments: Vocals; guitar; piano
- Years active: 2013–present
- Website: gavinbeckerofficial.com

Gavin Becker (born January 15, 1999) is an American singer, songwriter, and actor.

== Early life ==
Gavin Becker was born in Philadelphia, Pennsylvania. At the age of 9, he performed his first two original songs on keyboard at an open mic night at Milkboy taco truck in Ardmore, PA. He acted and sang in several plays and musicals.

== Career ==
TLA in Philadelphia, 2016

In 2013, Becker first started posting song covers and originals on the popular video sharing applications YouTube and Vine as well as performing live on YouNow. December 17, 2013, Becker held his first solo concert at World Cafe Live in Philadelphia.

In 2014, Becker's combined social media following had grown to over 199K. He performed on his first group tour for Press Play at Peabody's in Virginia Beach, Virginia, on March 8. On April 11 and 12, 2014, Becker performed on the MagCon tour along with Shawn Mendes and other young artists and social media personalities. In 2014, Becker went on to open for Timeflies, Icona Pop, Ryan Beatty, Kalin & Myles and AJR. He also participated in group tours such as the Digitour, Sunsation Tour, Jam Tour and FanRave Tour.

In 2015, Becker was the headliner for a performance at World Cafe Live in Philadelphia on January 31. Becker released his first solo single, "We Never Sleep", on April 19, 2015. Becker performed at DigiFest on June 6 at Citi Field and DigiFest Boston at the Palladium on June 7. Becker opened for Jack & Jack at Six Flags in NJ on June 27. Becker went on to release his first solo EP, Closer, on August 2, 2015. Becker co-headlined for the OMG Music Tour during the month of August.

In 2016, Becker released his second solo single, "Until You Were Gone", on February 3. On February 20, Becker headlined at Webster Hall in NYC. In 2016, Becker signed on to be a spokesperson for Put on the B.R.A.K.E.S. Foundation founded by race car driver Doug Herbert, with the goal of saving lives by training and educating teenage drivers and their parents about the importance of safe and responsible driving. In 2016, along with Daya, Becker was the opener for Jack & Jack at The Fillmore in Silver Spring, Maryland on March 3. On March 4 Becker and Daya opened to a sold-out show for Jack & Jack at the Theatre of Living Arts in Philadelphia. Becker was the headliner at The Saint in Asbury Park, New Jersey on April 6. Becker performed at Summerfest in Milwaukee on July 30. Becker opened for the Heffron Drive Summer Tour in Pittsburgh (August 3), Cleveland (August 4), Detroit (August 5) and Chicago (August 6). Becker was part of Live Nation's TLG Tour in NYC on August 16, Chicago (August 23), Indianapolis (August 25) and Cincinnati (August 26). On September 27, Becker released his third solo single, "Young Desire". Becker was part of the Team Rowland Tour with Hunter Rowland, Brandon Rowland, Ashton Rowland, and Nick Bean in Philadelphia at The Fillmore on December 16.

In 2017, Becker was interviewed and performed on TV for ABC Good Day PA (January 25 and March 16). Becker was the Headliner at The Voltage Lounge in Philadelphia on March 18. On May 6, 2017, Becker released his second solo EP, Til The Morning's Out. Becker joined DigiTour Spring in Philadelphia (April 2 TLA Theatre), New Jersey (April 8 at Gamechanger) and New York (April 9 Gramercy Theater). On May 20 Becker was the headliner at iPlay America in Freehold, NJ. Becker was one of the contestants on the ABC TV series Boy Band. On September 4, he became a member of the acapella group, the Vanderbilt Melodores.

In 2018, Becker formed the band Peachy with fellow Vanderbilt University students Sam Lazarus and Jeremy Trujillo. They released their debut single, "Heartbreaker" on May 10, 2018.

== Discography ==
EPs

- Closer (2015)
- Til The Morning's Out (2017)

Singles

- "We Never Sleep" (2015)
- "Until You Were Gone" (2016)
- "Young Desire"(2016)

== Music videos ==
- "Young Desire"
