= Shannon Lawson =

American singer-songwriter

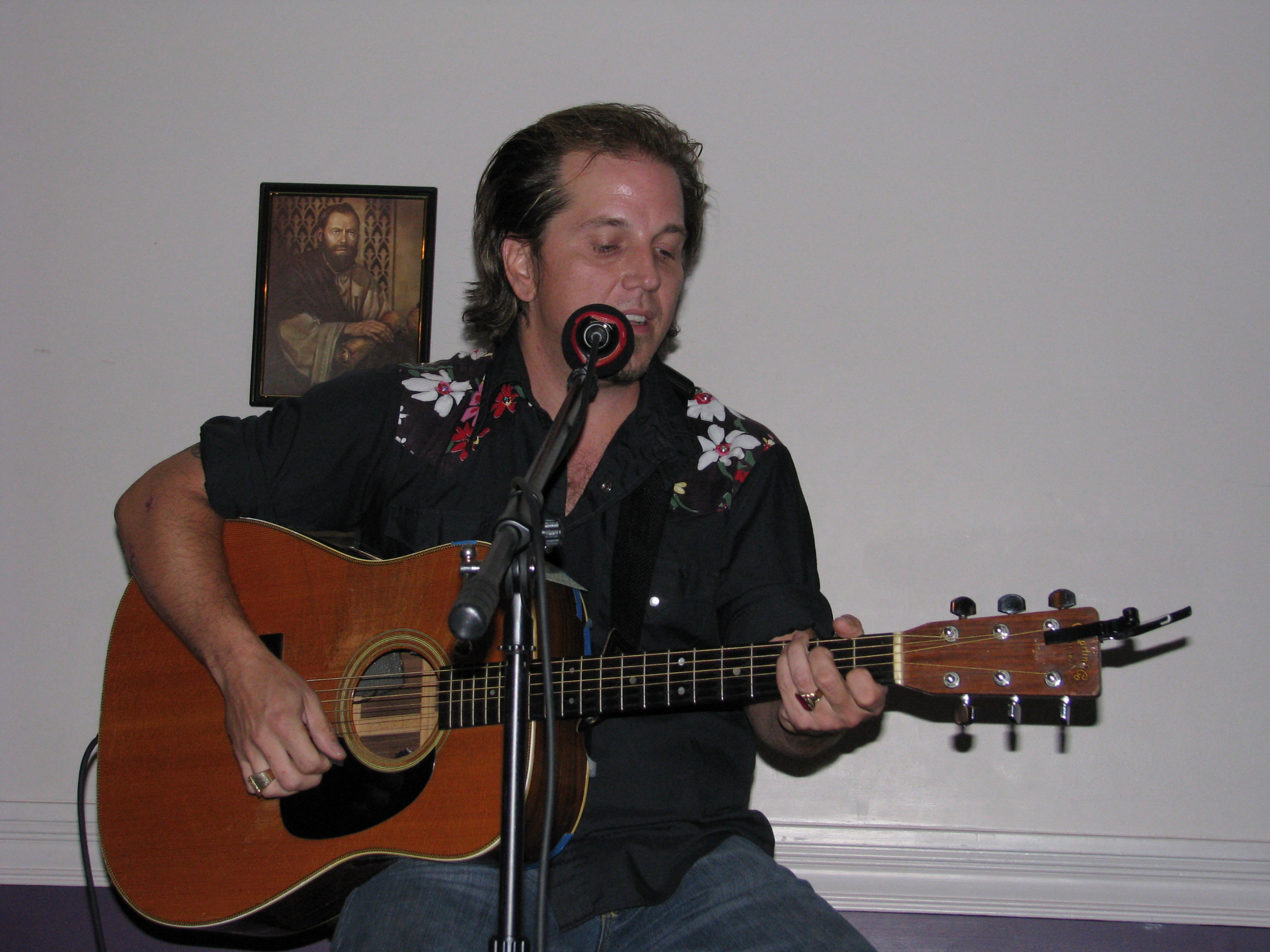
- Lawson performing in 2008

Background information
- Born: Shannon Lee Lawson; July 12, 1973 (age 53)
- Origin: Taylorsville, Kentucky, United States
- Genre: Country
- Occupation: Singer-songwriter
- Instruments: Vocals guitar mandolin
- Years active: 2002–present
- Labels: MCA Nashville; Equity
- Website: http://www.shannonlawson.com

Shannon Lee Lawson (born July 12, 1973) is an American country music artist and songwriter.

Lawson was originally signed to MCA Nashville Records, which released his debut album Chase the Sun in 2002. It produced two minor chart singles on the Billboard Hot Country Singles & Tracks (now Hot Country Songs) charts, including the No. 28-peaking "Goodbye on a Bad Day". Two years later, he was signed to Equity Music Group, a label owned by singer Clint Black. Although Lawson charted two more singles during his tenure on this label, his album for Equity (titled Big Yee-Haw) was not released.

== Biography ==
Lawson was born in Taylorsville, Kentucky into a family of amateur musicians, all of whom frequently played sessions at home. He began to play his uncle's guitar at age four, and later got a guitar of his own, on which Lawson's father taught him country songs. Lawson later formed a band in high school; although the band regularly played rock music, he would regularly perform covers of John Anderson as well.

He later moved to Louisville, Kentucky, where he attended college and joined a blues group called Top Hat, in which he played lead guitar and sang. Later, he moved on to playing as a solo acoustic act, eventually joining a bluegrass band named the Galoots. The Galoots recorded two albums independently. Soon, Lawson began writing songs for the band, with his material eventually landing him a deal with a publishing house in Nashville, Tennessee.

=== Solo career ===
Lawson left the Galoots and moved to Nashville, where he was signed to MCA Nashville Records in 2001, with his solo album Chase the Sun being released a year later. The album's producer, Mark Wright (who has also produced for Lee Ann Womack and Gary Allan, among others) allowed Lawson to use experimental instrumentation on this album. For example, one of the album's tracks features mandolinist Chris Thile of Nickel Creek. The mandolin was recorded through an amplifier, giving what Wright described as a "real crunchy sound, very different". Chase the Sun produced two chart singles in "Dream Your Way to Me" and "Goodbye on a Bad Day", which reached No. 45 and No. 28, respectively, on the Billboard Hot Country Singles & Tracks (now Hot Country Songs) charts. He was dropped from MCA after the release of his album, however.

Lawson joined the MuzikMafia in 2004. He briefly signed to Equity Music Group, a label started by country music artist Clint Black. A second album, Big Yee-Haw, was recorded for the label. Although two of its singles charted, the album was not released. Lawson co-wrote former Alabama lead singer Randy Owen's 2008 single "Like I Never Broke Her Heart", James Otto's 2008 single "These Are the Good Ole Days" and Big & Rich's 2014 single "Look at You".

== Discography ==
=== Albums ===
| Title | Album details | Peak chart positions | |
| Title | Album details | US Country | US Heat |
|---|---|---|---|
| Chase the Sun | Release date: June 4, 2002; Label: MCA Nashville | 35 | 24 |

=== Singles ===
| Year | Single | Peak positions | Album |
| Year | Single | US Country | Album |
|---|---|---|---|
| 2002 | "Goodbye on a Bad Day" | 28 | Chase the Sun |
| 2002 | "Dream Your Way to Me" | 45 | Chase the Sun |
| 2004 | "Smokin' Grass" | 53 | Big Yee-Haw (unreleased) |
| 2004 | "Just Like a Redneck" | 48 | Big Yee-Haw (unreleased) |

=== Music videos ===
| Year | Video | Director |
|---|---|---|
| 2002 | "Goodbye on a Bad Day" | Morgan Lawley |
