= Nick Hoffman =

American singer-songwriter, producer, and television personality

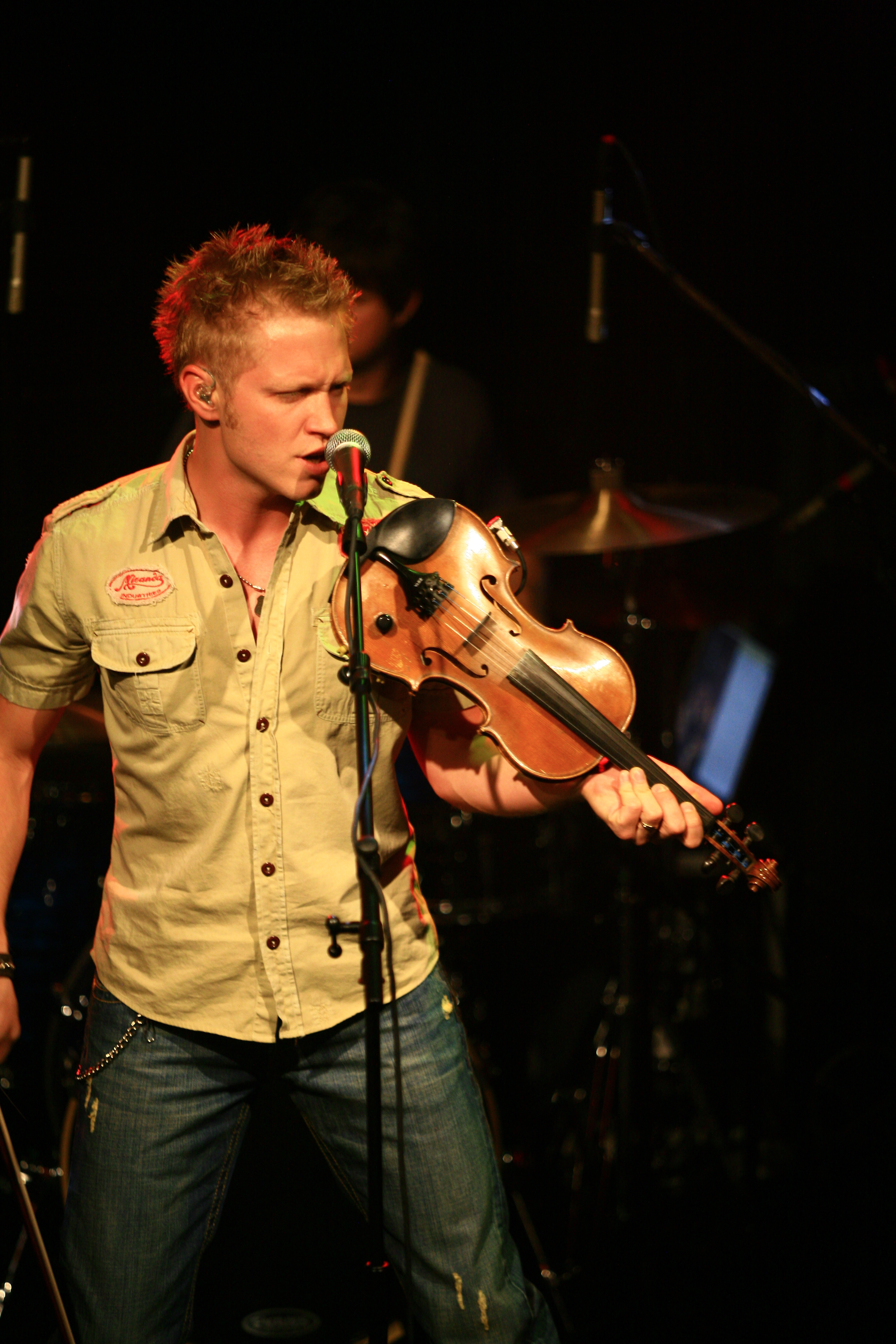

Background information
- Born: September 18, 1979 (age 46); Nowthen, Minnesota, United States
- Occupations: Singer/songwriter, TV personality
- Instruments: Fiddle, vocals
- Formerly of: The Farm

Nick Hoffman (born September 18, 1979) is an American singer-songwriter, fiddle player, producer, and television personality. He is also the host of the Outdoor Channel television series “Nick’s Wild Ride”, which airs on Outdoor Channel. He is also co-founder of the Elektra Records/Warner Music Nashville Recording Artists The Farm.

== Personal life ==
Nick Hoffman grew up in Nowthen, Minnesota, United States, to a musical family. He has been playing the fiddle for as long as he can remember, beginning at the age of four. His love of music came from his grandparents Harry and Sybil Hoffman who oftentimes held Saturday night jam sessions at their home in Anoka, MN. Hoffman grew up on a farm in which he was immersed in the outdoors – the woods, cornfields, and the lake.

Hoffman had wanted to move to Nashville since the age of 12. Hoffman left home in 1997 at the age of 17 and played in Branson, Missouri before moving to Nashville in January 2000.

In 2016, he married singer and songwriter Natalie Murphy.

Hoffman is a pilot and owns a Glasair Sportsman 2+2. He first flew at age 9 at AirVenture, then worked at an FBO at Crystal Airport in Minnesota.

== Music career ==
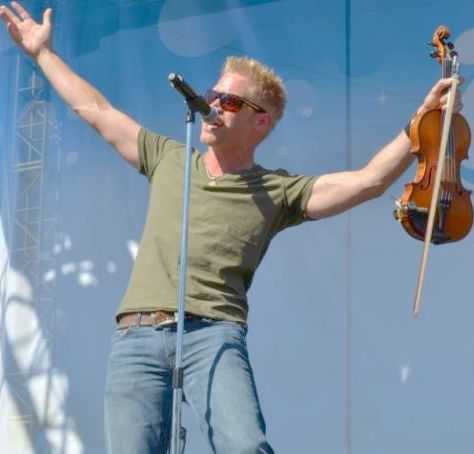
Nick Hoffman

Hoffman has collaborated and performed alongside many notable musical acts including Kenny Chesney, Keith Urban, Trace Adkins, Sara Evans, Brooks & Dunn, and more.

Before moving to Nashville, Hoffman joined a musical act owned by Dolly Parton in Branson, MO. He played for a time there before returning to his hometown to finish his high school degree. After returning home, he joined the cover band High Noon, which played at the Winstock Country Music Festival in 1999.

In 2000, Nick moved to Nashville where he joined Kenny Chesney's band. His tenure lasted from February 2000 to 2012. He had the opportunity to perform with such stars as Tim McGraw, George Jones, Dave Matthews and Kid Rock. He won the Country Music Association's CMA-SRO award for Touring Musician of the Year in 2012

In 2010, Hoffman co-founded, along with Krista Marie and Damien Horne, the trio The Farm, which was signed to Warner Music Nashville. He co-produced their self-titled debut album alongside hit songwriter and producer Danny Myrick. This Album produced two Top 40 radio hits: “Home Sweet Home” which hit #19 on the Country Charts and “Be Grateful” which hit #39.

== Television ==
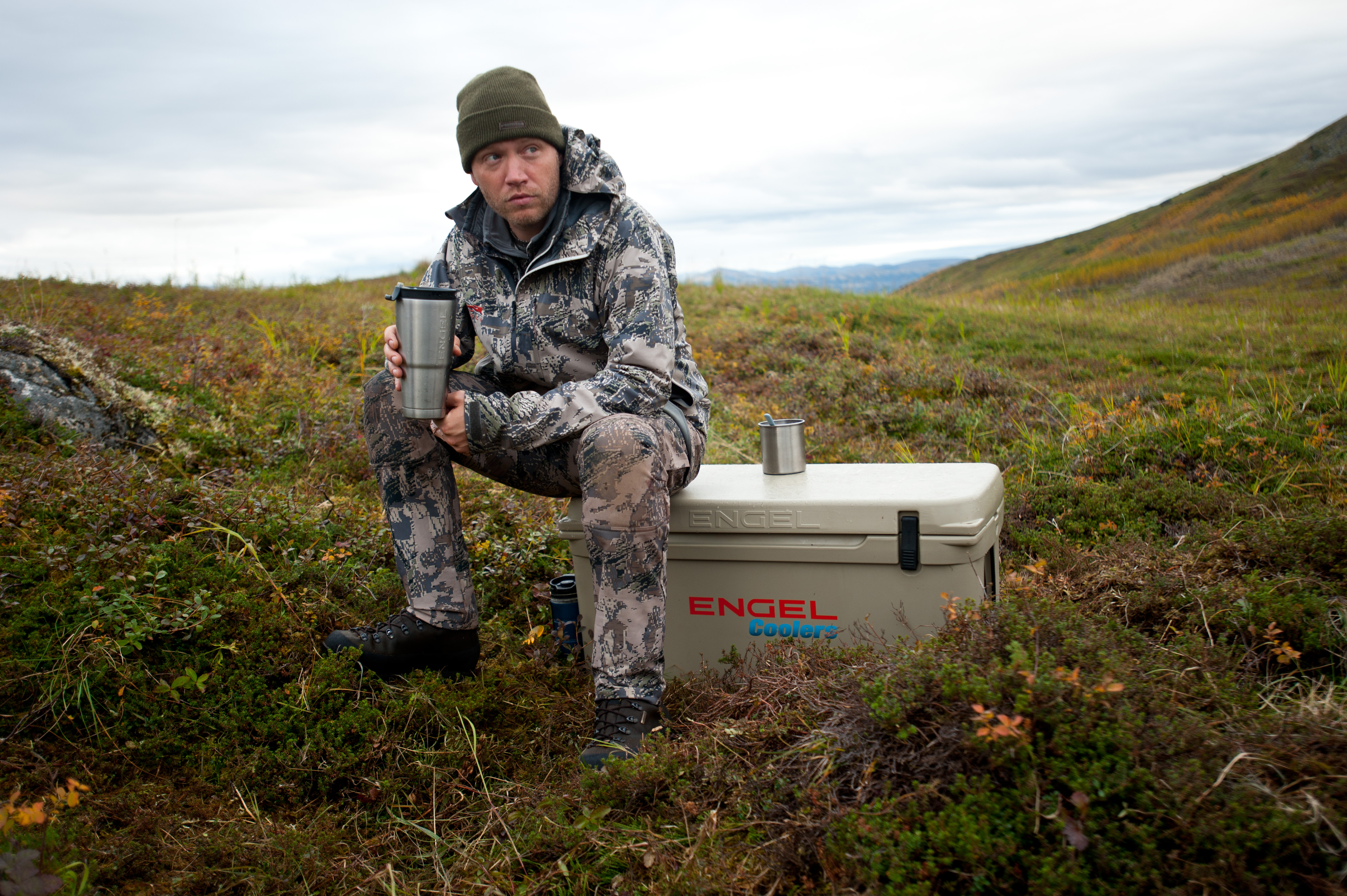
Nick Hoffman, Host of "Nick's Wild Ride" on Outdoor Channel on location in Alaska in 2016

Hoffman is the host of the Outdoor Channel’s television series “Nick’s Wild Ride”. The show follows Hoffman as he travels around the world hunting unusual species and exploring the culture of the area that he visits. The show is more than just about hunting, as it includes exploration of the country he travels to, along with scenes of him fiddling.

"Nick's Wild Ride" won the award for "Best Conservation" during the 2018 Outdoor Sportsman Awards. Hoffman's production company Ugly Duckling Entertainment was also awarded a Telly Award for "Public Service/Activism" a short-form piece he produced about conservation issues related to Africa.

The 8th Season of the show will debut in the fall of 2023.

== Awards ==
Nick Hoffman received the Country Music Association's CMA-SRO award for Touring Musician of the Year in 2012. THE FARM was nominated for the American Country Awards New Artist Single of the Year for “Home Sweet Home”.

In 2017 the First Season of his show, “Nick’s Wild Ride”, was nominated for the Outdoor Sportsman Award “Best New Show”. It won 3 Telly Awards including awards for "Travel/Tourism", and "Public Service/Activism". In 2018, it was nominated for 4 Outdoor Sportsman Awards, including "Best Overall Production" and was the winner of the award for "Best Conservation".
