= Krista Marie =

American singer-songwriter

- Origin: Batavia, New York, United States
- Genres: Country
- Occupation: Singer-songwriter
- Instrument: Vocals
- Years active: 2009–present
- Labels: Holeshot/Broken Bow
- Formerly of: The Farm
- Website: www.kristamarie.com

Krista Marie is an American country music artist; she is signed to Broken Bow Records subsidiary Holeshot Records. She has charted twice on the Billboard country singles charts. She is also a former member of The Farm.

== Biography ==
Marie is also an avid ATV Motocross racer. In 2008, Marie was involved in a crash while racing her ATV in Blountville, Tennessee, suffering multiple injuries including a lacerated liver and four fractured vertebrae. Just over a month later, she performed at the Hurricane Mills, TN ATV Dirt Days. According to her interview, she plans to continue racing, but will be selective in the events she enters.

In March 2009, Marie started a promotional motorcycle ride as part of International Female Ride Day in Milwaukee, Wisconsin. Her song "Drive It Like I Stole It" was used by ESPN for its coverage of the 2009 NHRA drag racing. In addition, this song was made available as a ringtone, with profits from the ringtone going to the teen-driving safety association B.R.A.K.E.S. Marie charted in 2009 with "Jeep Jeep," followed by "Tomboy" in October.

Marie founded the band The Farm in 2011 with Damien Horne and Nick Hoffman. The Farm signed to Elektra Records that same year.

== Discography ==
=== Singles ===
Year	Single	Peak positions	Album
Year	Single	US Country	Album
2009	"Somethin' Fun"	—	—
2009	"Jeep Jeep"	57	—
2009	"Tomboy"	57	—

=== Music videos ===
Year	Video	Director
2009	"Tomboy"	Trey Fanjoy
