= Cummins Station =

Historic building in Nashville, Tennessee, US

- U.S. National Register of Historic Places
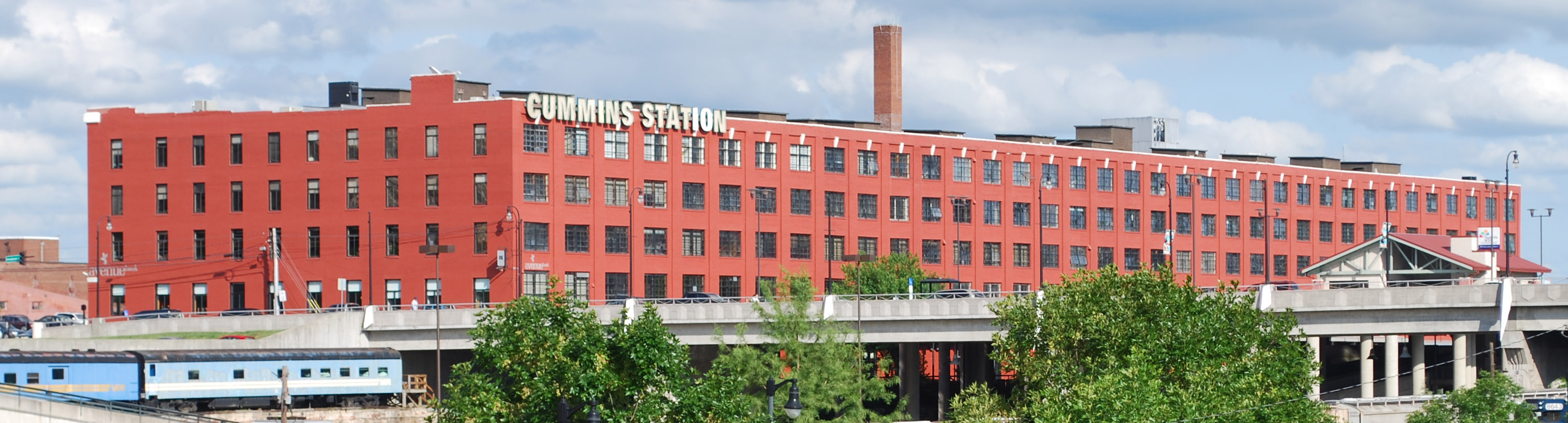
- Cummins Station in 2010

- Location within Tennessee
- Location: Demonbreun and 10th Ave., S., Nashville, Tennessee
- Coordinates: 36°9′19″N 86°46′58″W
- Area: 1.4 acres (0.57 ha)
- Built: 1906
- NRHP reference No.: 83004233
- Added to NRHP: November 17, 1983

Cummins Station is a historic building near Union Station in Nashville, Tennessee, U.S. It was built with reinforced concrete in 1906. It was built for William J. Cummins, the chairman of the Bon Air Coal and Iron Corporation, and other investors by the Oliver Contracting Company. Upon its completion, it was the largest reinforced concrete industrial warehouse in the world. It has been listed on the National Register of Historic Places since November 17, 1983.
