= Damien Horne =

American singer-songwriter

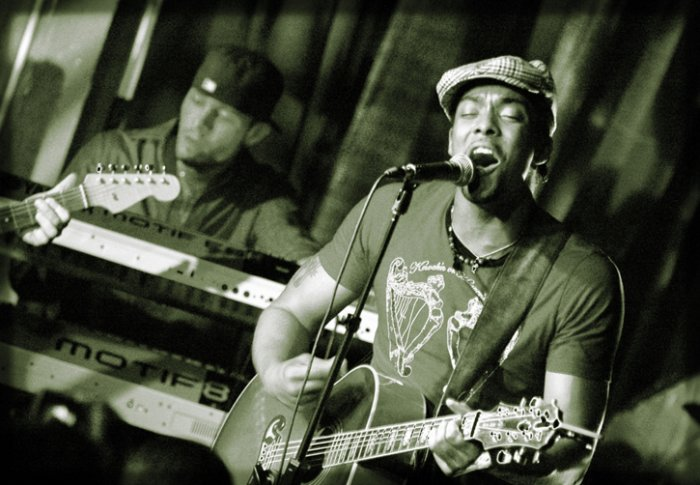
- Horne at the Cummins Station in Nashville, Tennessee on August 24, 2006

Background information
- Also known as: Mista D
- Born: July 14, 1978 (age 47)
- Occupations: Singer, songwriter
- Instruments: Vocals, guitar, piano
- Years active: 2001-present
- Formerly of: The Farm
- Website: www.damienhorne.com

Damien Horne, also known as Mista D (born July 14, 1978) is an American recording artist, musician and songwriter.

He is a member of the trio The Farm, as well as Nashville's MuzikMafia, and is involved with the Salvation Army, Samaritan's Feet, and other humanitarian organizations.

He has collaborated and performed with Melissa Manchester, Bon Jovi, Kid Rock, John Legend, Hank Williams, Jr. The Commodores, 3 Doors Down, Faith Hill, Big & Rich, Shemekia Copeland, Robert Randolph, Jewel, Josh Kelley, Gretchen Wilson, Velvet Revolver, and The Neville Brothers.

== Career ==
He became a member of the MuzikMafia in 2001, and recorded his first album Somebody's Hero in 2008 under the direction and production of Big Kenny of Big & Rich. When asked about the project, Big Kenny said

"I have never met a more important artist for our times, completely real, unique, deserving and uplifting. I cannot stop until the world hears his music. He writes, he sings, he plays piano and guitar, he dances like 'the man' and you know it when he backflips off the stage in a way that would make James Brown proud."

Horne signed a publishing deal with Big Love Music in 2007.

He has made appearances on One Cubed, The 700 Club, and Legends & Lyrics, as well as appeared in Rolling Stone and on the cover of Lifeway Christian Singles magazine.

In 2006, he and Keith Urban put together and directed a children's choir during the 2006 CMT awards show in tribute to the victims of Hurricane Katrina.

In 2007, he made a trip along with fellow MuzikMafia member Big Kenny to Akon Sudan to bring medical and school supplies, along with musical instruments, clothing and building tools to the Kunyuk School for Girls.

In 2008, he appeared on Extreme Makeover Home Edition working alongside the crew and people of Charlotte North Carolina to help build a house for the King family. In addition, he performed a benefit concert with his band to raise money for the family. Later in 2008, he walked 300 miles with Emmanuel "Manny" Ohonme performing nightly at each stop for the Samaritan's Feet organization to raise one million pairs of shoes for children. He also wrote and recorded the theme song for the organization produced and arranged by his keyboardist Chris Mendoza.

In 2009, he and Big Kenny hosted "Nashville 4 Africa", with Faith Hill, Keith Urban, Dierks Bentley, and Brad Arnold of 3 Doors Down. A benefit concert to raise money for charitable causes in Uganda and Sudan.

Horne's song "She Can Play" is the theme song for the ACC.

Horne has also worked Singer-Songwriter John Legend. When asked about up and coming artists we should look out for, John said:

"I’ve been working with this guy who is based in Nashville, his name is Damien Horne, he’s good. Look out for him, he’s a good song-writer and performer. He plays the guitar too."

In 2010, Horne contributed four tracks to Big Kenny's third solo album, Big Kenny's Love Everybody Traveling Musical Medicine Show Mix Tape, Vol. 1. In 2011, Horne founded The Farm with Krista Marie and Nick Hoffman.
