= James Otto =

American country music artist (born 1973)

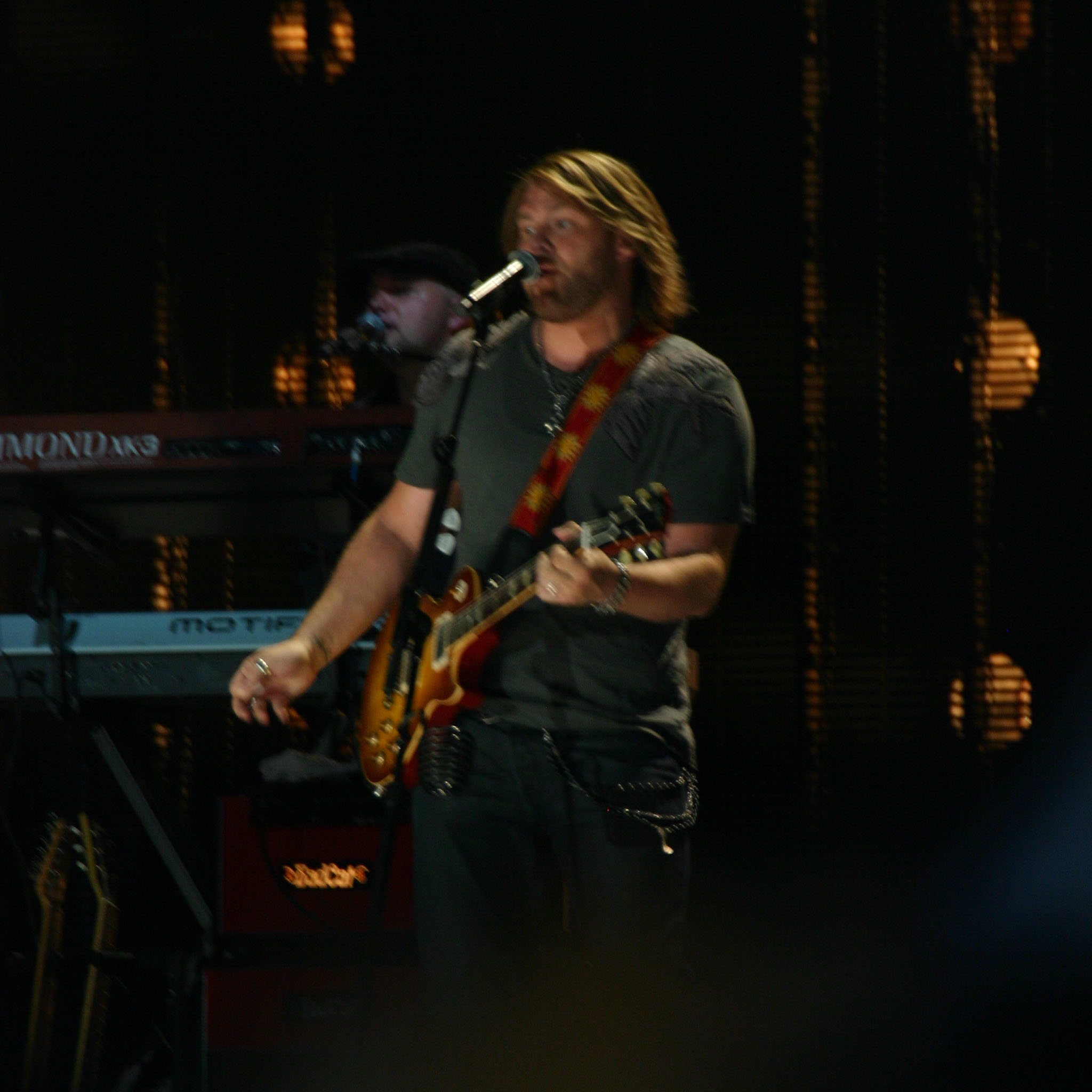
- Otto performing in 2008

Background information
- Born: James Allen Otto; July 29, 1973 (age 52)
- Origin: Fort Lewis, Washington, United States
- Genres: Country
- Occupation: Singer-songwriter
- Instruments: Vocals rhythm guitar
- Years active: 2002–present
- Labels: Mercury Nashville; Warner Bros. Nashville; Blaster
- Spouse: Amy Alderson (m. 2005)
- Website: jamesotto.net

James Allen Otto (born July 29, 1973) is an American country music singer and songwriter. Otto began his career on Mercury Nashville Records in 2002, charting three minor singles on the Billboard Hot Country Songs charts and recording his debut album Days of Our Lives for the label before being dropped in 2004.

In late 2007, he signed to Warner Bros. Records. His second album, Sunset Man, was released in April 2008. It was co-produced by Otto, along with John Rich of Big & Rich and Jay DeMarcus of Rascal Flatts, the latter of whom is Otto's brother-in-law. The lead-off single to Sunset Man, "Just Got Started Lovin' You", became Otto's first Number One hit, as well as the Number One country single of 2008 according to Billboard.

== Personal life ==
James Otto was born on July 29, 1973, on the Fort Lewis Army Base in the state of Washington. He first took up singing at age 2 and later learned to play violin and saxophone. However, he wanted to learn to play guitar as well. At age 13, he received a guitar for his birthday.

He traveled throughout the country for most of his childhood, but his family finally settled in the small town of Benton City, Washington. After graduating from Kiona-Benton High School, Otto joined the United States Navy, where he served for two years. In 1998, he moved to Nashville, Tennessee, and began attending songwriters' nights there; three years later, he joined the MuzikMafia, a group of country music songwriters which includes Big & Rich and Gretchen Wilson.

Otto married his wife Amy Alderson, the sister of actress and model Allison Alderson, in October 2005. Amy gave birth to their first child, Ava Katherine on August 24, 2010.

== Musical career ==
=== Days of Our Lives ===
In 2002, Otto met Scott Parker of Mercury Nashville Records, who signed him to a record deal that year. His first single, "The Ball", peaked at No. 45 on the Billboard country charts, while a second single, "Long Way Down", failed to chart at all. Due to the poor chart performance of these singles, Otto's debut album was delayed. "Days of Our Lives", his third release for the label, was released in late 2003, peaking at No. 33 on the country charts. Shortly after the song peaked, his debut album (also entitled Days of Our Lives) was released on Mercury, and in 2004, Otto was signed as an opening act for Shania Twain on her Up! Tour. His fourth single for Mercury, "Sunday Morning and Saturday Night", peaked at No. 58. After the song fell from the charts, Otto exited Mercury's roster. From there, he began working with the MuzikMafia, a gathering of singer-songwriters founded by Big & Rich, Gretchen Wilson and Cowboy Troy. Otto co-wrote songs and sang background vocals on two of Cowboy Troy's albums: Loco Motive and Black in the Saddle, released in 2005 and early 2007, respectively.

=== Sunset Man and Shake What God Gave Ya ===
By mid-2007, Otto signed to Warner Bros. Records Nashville. His first single for the label, "Just Got Started Lovin' You", was released at the end of that year as the lead-off single to his second album, Sunset Man. The album was co-produced by Otto's brother-in-law, Jay DeMarcus of Rascal Flatts, along with Big & Rich's John Rich. Sunset Man peaked at No. 2 on Top Country Albums upon its April release. "Just Got Started Lovin' You" reached Number One on the Hot Country Songs charts a month later, becoming the highest-charting single of his career as well as the Number One country single of 2008 according to the Billboard Year-End charts. The album's other two singles — "For You" and "These Are the Good Ole Days" — did not perform as well on the charts, peaking at No. 39 and No. 36 in September 2008 and January 2009, respectively.

In mid-2008, Otto was commissioned to perform a new theme song for the Atlanta Braves, entitled "The Braves Play Here," composed by Greg Barnhill and Randy Wachtler for 615 Music. He also co-wrote Jamey Johnson's mid-2008 single "In Color" with Johnson and Lee Thomas Miller. This song was nominated for a Grammy Award for Best Country Song at the 2008 Grammy Awards, and received the 2008 Academy of Country Music award for Song of the Year, which is awarded to the songwriters.

Otto released a new single, "Since You Brought It Up", in April 2009. It peaked at number 37, and did not appear on a studio album. The song was followed by "Groovy Little Summer Song" in early 2010. It reached the Top 30 and served as the lead-off single from Otto's third album, Shake What God Gave Ya, which was produced by Paul Worley and was released on September 14, 2010. The album's second single, "Soldiers & Jesus," was released to country radio on September 7, 2010, and reached a peak of number 34. In March 2011, Otto announced on his Twitter that he had exited Warner Bros. Records.

Otto also performed backing vocals on the original album cut of the song "Chicken & Biscuits", performed by country rap artist Colt Ford on his 2010 album of the same name. The single version, however, features Rhean Boyer of Carolina Rain in place of Otto singing on backup. Otto also co-wrote Zac Brown Band's 2012 single "No Hurry".

=== New record label signing ===
Otto self-released a new single, "Somewhere Tonight", in late 2014 via his own Ottopilot Records. In June 2015, Otto signed with Blaster Records, and "Somewhere Tonight" was released to country radio on July 13, 2015, as his first single with the record label. In 2024, Otto released a cover of the Beyoncé song "Texas Hold 'Em". That same year, Otto also announced a new studio album, Self Made Fool, though it has not been released as of March 2026.

In mid-2026, the Mavericks announced that, following the death of their lead singer Raul Malo in 2025, they would begin a new tour that year with Otto as featured vocalists. This tour is known as the Music Lives On Tour.

== Discography ==
=== Studio albums ===
Title	Album details	Peak chart positions	
Title	Album details	US Country	US
Days of Our Lives	Release date: March 9, 2004; Label: Mercury Nashville	61	—
Sunset Man	Release date: April 8, 2008; Label: Raybaw/Warner Bros. Nashville	2	3
Shake What God Gave Ya	Release date: September 14, 2010; Label: Warner Bros. Nashville	10	63
"—" denotes releases that did not chart

=== Singles ===
Year	Single	Peak chart positions				Certifications (sales threshold)	Album
Year	Single	US Country	US Country Airplay	US	CAN	Certifications (sales threshold)	Album
2002	"The Ball"	45		—	—		Days of Our Lives
2003	"Days of Our Lives"	33		—	—		Days of Our Lives
2004	"Sunday Morning and Saturday Night"	58		—	—		Days of Our Lives
2007	"Just Got Started Lovin' You"	1		27	71	US: Gold	Sunset Man
2008	"For You"	39		—	—		Sunset Man
2008	"These Are the Good Ole Days"	36		—	—		Sunset Man
2009	"Since You Brought It Up"	37		—	—		—N/a
2010	"Groovy Little Summer Song"	26		—	—		Shake What God Gave Ya
2010	"Soldiers & Jesus"	34		—	—		Shake What God Gave Ya
2015	"Somewhere Tonight"	—	57	—	—		—N/a
"—" denotes releases that did not chart

=== Music videos ===
Year	Video	Director
2008	"Just Got Started Lovin' You"	Ryan Smith
2008	"For You"	Kristin Barlowe/Jack Roberts
2009	"These Are the Good Ole Days"	Ryan Smith
2010	"Groovy Little Summer Song"	David McClister
