= MuzikMafia =

American country music artist collection

The MuzikMafia was an informal collection of American country music artists, founded in October 2001 in Nashville, Tennessee by Big Kenny and John Rich (who compose the duo Big & Rich), along with Jon Nicholson and Cory Gierman. They have been the subject of a six-episode television series on the network Country Music Television, entitled MuzikMafia TV, which followed the Muzik Mafia on their first stadium tour, the American Revolution Tour.

The original MuzikMafia was born from an open mic night in Nashville. While they aren't official members, people who have performed at the MuzikMafia jams include Kid Rock, 3 Doors Down, Velvet Revolver, Bon Jovi, Stephen Cochran, Jewel, Bobby Brown, Sisqo, and Saliva.

== History ==
=== Founding of the MuzikMafia ===
The Muzik Mafia, (Musically Artistic Friends In Alliance) was a ragtag collection of musician friends and collaborators. It is most responsible for the birth and early feeding of country acts like Big & Rich and Gretchen Wilson. It was the creative brainstorm of four friends known as the founding “Godfathers,” Big Kenny, John Rich (of Big & Rich), R&B/rock/country singer-songwriter Jon Nicholson, and music publisher/executive Cory Gierman. All four were well-versed in the same eclectic musical mix, and they decided to meet periodically to perform together. They made an informal pact: no competition, only cooperation and mutual support. Merging styles and genres, gatherings could range from a rock & country sound to a bluegrass riff to a reggae swag.

The godfathers founded MuzikMafia with an ideology of anti-commercialism—a response to Music Row’s commercial hegemony in Nashville. One of MuzikMafia’s numerous connections to these earlier phenomena is that each contributes to the idea of artistic events as spectacles. For MuzikMafia members, culture was primarily “lived” through experience rather than emphasized on, a reflection of, or adherence to industry norms of how commercial musicians should look or sound. Their original intention was to create a weekly jam session in which like-minded individuals could enjoy a variety of styles in an informal setting.

The first “official Muzik Mafia” was born from an open mic night at the Pub of Love, Nashville, TN on October 23, 2001. They held shows intentionally late each Tuesday evening because Tuesdays were, according to the godfathers, “the worst night of the week." and to avoid the club crowd that frequented weekend Nashville locales. Focusing more on those who were dedicated to an intensely intimate and social musical experience at an inconvenient time and day of the week. Each performance was free-of-charge and featured musicians from diverse genres, spoken-word artists, a juggler, a fire-breather, and a painter.

Everything was acoustic and usually performed on guitar accompanied by a percussionist who played a set of older conga drums with drumsticks. Regardless of age, ethnicity, sex, gender, financial status, social ranking, or belief system welcoming everyone at performances, promoting an atmosphere of acceptance. Tuesday shows were an opportunity for MuzikMafia musicians and audience members to be themselves, rather than representations of socially accepted norms.

=== National recognition ===
The fact that the MuzikMafia did not promote a single musical idiom might seem like a disqualifying factor in the industry. Their unifying trait was its diversity. The roster included artists who specialized in blues, rock, pop, rap, country, bluegrass, gospel, R&B, and soul that, collectively, are representative of Nashville’s rich history of musical diversity and the city’s current identification as “Music City, U.S.A.” The rapid growth in popularity of the MuzikMafia was the result of its two breakout acts, Big & Rich and Gretchen Wilson, who celebrated combined record sales of approximately five million units just from May through December 2004.

Kid Rock invited the MuzikMafia to perform with him on several tour dates in February and March 2004. The first took place on February 12, 2004 in Chattanooga, Tennessee. Similar MuzikMafia performances with Kid Rock took place in Memphis on 6 March and in Detroit on 20 March that year.

MuzikMafia received massive public exposure in 2004. From The Wall Street Journal, Rolling Stone, the Los Angeles Times, USA Today, Entertainment Weekly, The Tennessean, Country Music Today, Billboard Magazine, The Washington Post, Blender Magazine, Country Weekly, and The New York Times. Magazine covers such as Country Weekly and Entertainment Weekly were shouting, “ The Muzik Mafia wants you!”

=== MuzikMafia TV ===
MuzikMafia TV was both a television documentary and a reality show. The six-episode series included behind-the-scenes footage of life on the road during their first stadium tour, The American Revolution Tour (Sponsored by Chevrolet). Documenting the community’s rise to national prominence the show became an instant hit. Ivan Dudynsky (producer of MuzikMafia TV) of Live Animals Productions approached the godfathers in late summer 2004 with the idea of producing something on the MuzikMafia for CMT. The first episode of MuzikMafia TV premiered on 15 January 2005 on CMT.

=== Last performance ===
By the summer of 2002 it was evident that the MuzikMafia was a significant part of the Nashville music scene. The Pub of Love’s performance area was small; barely 12’ X 20’, and the building was in disrepair, including an upstairs ceiling that was sagging in several places. The Pub was incapable of accommodating the rapidly growing fan base, several weeks in the summer of 2002, the MuzikMafia performed outside in the adjacent parking lot. Unable to contain their Tuesday night fans, 2002 to 2007 MuzikMafia moved to larger clubs: Tin Roof, 12th & Porter, Mercy Lounge & Fuel. Occasionally, when there was not a weekly show, some of the members would show up to play on Tuesday & Thursday nights at Dan McGuinness, where there was another weekly show called "Dirt Pharm" formed by musicians associated with the MuzikMafia. The final MuzikMafia show was held in January 2008 at the Sam Phillips Music Celebration, in Muscle Shoals Alabama, after a disagreement between members.

== List of MuzikMafia members ==
The core membership of the MuzikMafia was small—less than twenty individuals. Separately, they are artists, each of whom has experienced relative degrees of success and failure, respectively, in their personal and professional lives. Together, they contributed to significant change in the commercial music industry and beyond.

=== Godfathers and godmother ===
Cory Gierman
Big Kenny
Jon Nicholson
John Rich
Gretchen Wilson

=== Family members ===
James Otto (Musician)
Cowboy Troy (Musician)
Damien Horne-Pop/Rock Artist
Rachel Kice (Painter)
Shannon Lawson (Musician)
Two-Foot Fred (Business Man, Comedian)
Shanna Crooks (Musician)
Spoken Word Jen "SWJ" (Poet)
John Anderson (Musician) - Honorary Member

=== Pit bosses ===
Max Abrams (a.k.a. "Max on Sax")
Pino Squillace
Richard Hardin
The Reverend Elijah D.D. Holt
Jerry Navarro
Adam Shoenfeld
Sean Smith

=== Visiting relatives ===
Kid Rock
3 Doors Down
Velvet Revolver
Bon Jovi
Jewel
Bobby Brown
Sisqo
Saliva
Wynonna Judd
Hank Williams Jr
Darryl McDaniels (Run DMC)
Peter Wolf (J. Geils Band)
George Clinton
Angie Aparo
Martina McBride
Keith Urban
Toby Keith
Richie Sambora
James Hetfield
Buzz M. Kiefer
Scott Sanford

=== Former members ===
Dean Hall (Resigned from the Mafia in December 2005)
Chance (Hit in February 2007)

=== Panelists ===
In October 2005, Muzikmafia members were receiving their booking engagements through William Morris Agency. The early panelists include

Cory Gierman
Big Kenny
Jon Nicholson
John Rich
Bill Moore
Cowboy Troy (Musician)
Shannon Lawson (Musician)
Rachel Kice (Painter)
