= B.R.A.K.E.S. =

Nonprofit driving safety organization

B.R.A.K.E.S. (Be Responsible and Keep Everyone Safe)
- Put on the Brakes
- Formation: 2008; 18 years ago
- Founder: Doug Herbert
- Type: Nonprofit organization
- Legal status: 501(c)(3) organization
- Purpose: Train teen drivers advanced skills to increase safety
- Location: Concord, North Carolina, United States
- Region served: United States
- Services: Free teen driver training sessions
- Key people: Ricky Rudd (Spokesperson)
- Funding: Public donations and sponsorship
- Website: putonthebrakes.org

B.R.A.K.E.S. ("Be Responsible and Keep Everyone Safe") is a teen-driving safety organization in the United States founded in 2008 by NHRA Top Fuel driver Doug Herbert following the death of his two sons, Jon and James, in an automobile accident. The organization's stated goal is "to prevent injuries and save lives by training and educating teenage drivers and their parents about the importance of safe and responsible driving."

The organization holds nonprofit status in the United States under Section 501(c)(3) of the Internal Revenue Code.

Retired NASCAR driver Ricky Rudd is a spokesman for the group, along with Herbert. Other notable members of the organization include NHRA pro-stock motorcycle driver Steve Johnson, veteran NASCAR crew chief Barry Dodson (who also lost two children in a 1994 auto accident), automotive journalist Tom Cotter, TV executive Patti Wheeler, and former President at the Speedway Club at Charlotte Motor Speedway Wanda Miller.

On December 8, 2010, Herbert was nominated for the inaugural 2010 United Nations NGO Positive Peace Awards, in the Professional Sports Team and Professional Athlete categories, for his advocacy of B.R.A.K.E.S.
