= Greatest Hits 1995–2005 =

Greatest hits album by Jason McCoy
- Released: October 18, 2005
- Genre: Country
- Length: 54:39
- Label: Open Road Recordings

Jason McCoy chronology
Sins, Lies and Angels (2003)	Greatest Hits 1995–2005 (2005)	Christmas at the Grand (2010)

Greatest Hits 1995–2005 is the first greatest hits compilation by Canadian country music singer Jason McCoy, released on October 18, 2005, through Open Road Recordings.

== Track listing ==
1. "Born Again in Dixieland" (Jason McCoy, Odie Blackmon) – 3:25
2. "This Used to Be Our Town" (Denny Carr, McCoy, Chris Lindsey) – 3:46
3. "She Ain't Missin' Missin' Me" (McCoy, Blackmon) – 2:46
4. "Still" (McCoy, George Ducas) – 4:07
5. "I Feel a Sin Comin' On" (McCoy, Carr) – 2:35
6. "Kind of Like It's Love" (Jim Lauderdale, John Leventhal) – 3:00
7. "Fix Anything" (McCoy, Carr) – 4:08
8. "I'm Not Running Anymore" (McCoy, Carr) – 3:54
9. "Ten Million Teardrops" (McCoy, Tim Taylor) – 3:14
10. "Learning a Lot About Love" (Terrine Barnes, McCoy) – 3:35
11. "A Little Bit of You" (Craig Wiseman, McCoy, Sonny Burgess) – 2:56
12. "Candle" (McCoy, Barnes) – 3:07
13. "Heaven Help Her Heart" (McCoy, Blackmon) – 3:13
14. "Bury My Heart" (Tia Sillers, Mark Selby, Sean Michaels) – 2:58
15. "I Lie" (McCoy) – 4:15
16. "I'm Gonna Make Her Mine" (McCoy, Lindsey) – 3:17
