= The Road Hammers (album) =

Studio album by The Road Hammers
- Released: May 10, 2005 (Canada); June 24, 2008 (USA)
- Genre: Country rock
- Length: 48:26 (Canada); 48:57 (USA)
- Labels: Open Road (Canada); Montage Music Group (USA)
- Producers: Scott Baggett; Jason McCoy

The Road Hammers chronology
The Road Hammers (2005)	The Road Hammers II (2009)

Blood, Sweat & Steel

Professional ratings
Review scores
Source	Rating
Allmusic	2.5/5 stars
Allmusic	3.5/5 stars

The Road Hammers is the debut album of The Road Hammers, a Canadian-based country rock band fronted by singer Jason McCoy. Released in 2005 on Open Road Recordings, it produced the singles "I'm a Road Hammer", "East Bound and Down" (a cover of the Jerry Reed song), "Nashville Bound" and "Girl on the Billboard" (a cover of the Del Reeves song). Each of these songs reached Top Ten on the Canadian country music charts for The Road Hammers. The song "A Heart with Four-Wheel Drive" was previously recorded by 4 Runner on their self-titled album, and "The Hammer Going Down" by Chris Knight on his self-titled debut album.

The album was released in the U.S. as Blood Sweat & Steel in 2008, including three new tracks produced by Michael Knox.

== Track listing ==
1. "Ignition" – 0:08
2. "I'm a Road Hammer" (Denny Carr, Jason McCoy) – 4:05
3. "Overdrive" (McCoy, Robert Ellis Orrall) – 3:49
4. "Keep On Truckin'" (Scott Baggett, Clayton Bellamy, Chris Byrne, Denny Carr, McCoy) – 3:55
5. "Girl on the Billboard" (Walter Haynes, Hank Mills) – 4:07
6. "A Heart with Four-Wheel Drive" (Billy Maddox, Paul Thorn) – 3:41
7. "East Bound and Down" (Jerry Reed) – 3:13
8. "Call It a Day" (Steve Fox, McCoy, Tim Taylor) – 4:03
9. "Nashville Bound" (Bellamy, McCoy) – 4:23
10. "Willin'" (Lowel T. George) – 4:05
11. "The Hammer Goin' Down" (Chris Knight, Dean Miller) – 5:15
12. "I'm a Road Hammer Reprise" (Carr, McCoy) – 5:35
13. "Flat Tires (Bloopers, Out-Takes 'N Such)" – 2:00
14. "Absolutely Nothing" – 0:07
  - track is seven seconds of silence

== Blood, Sweat & Steel ==
A reissue of the album, titled Blood Sweat & Steel, was released by Montage Music Group on June 24, 2008, in the United States, it serves as their debut album in that region. Three songs, produced by Michael Knox, were added to the album: The 2007 single, "I Don't Know When to Quit", that peaked at No. 51 on the Hot Country Songs chart, "Workin' Hard at Lovin' You" and "I've Got the Scars to Prove It".

1. "I'm a Road Hammer" (Denny Carr, Jason McCoy) - 4:04
2. "Workin' Hard at Lovin' You" (Byron Hill, Vicky McGehee, John Rich) - 3:34
3. "The Hammer Going Down" (Chris Knight, Dean Miller) - 5:07
4. "East Bound and Down" (Jerry Reed) - 3:13
5. "I Don't Know When to Quit" (Ashley Gorley, Dick Simpson) - 3:18
6. "Girl on the Billboard" (Walter Haynes, Hank Mills) - 4:04
7. "I've Got the Scars to Prove It" (Larry Haack, McCoy, Bobby Taylor) - 3:33
8. "Nashville Bound" (Clayton Bellamy, McCoy) - 4:26
9. "Overdrive" (McCoy, Robert Ellis Orrall) - 3:49
10. "Keep on Truckin'" (Scott Baggett, Bellamy, Chris Byrne, Carr, McCoy) - 3:57
11. "Willin'" (Lowel T. George) - 4:09
12. "A Heart with Four Wheel Drive" (Billy Maddox, Paul Thorn) - 3:44
13. "Flat Tires (Bloopers, Out-Takes 'N Such)" - 1:59

== Awards and certifications ==
- 2006 Juno Award for Country Recording of the Year

Region	Certification
Canada (Music Canada)	Platinum

== Chart performance ==
Chart (2008)	Peak position
U.S. Billboard Top Country Albums	50
U.S. Billboard Top Heatseekers	39
