= List of Mantracker episodes =

Mantracker is a Canadian reality television series that premiered in April 2006 on the Outdoor Life Network (OLN). In the United States, the show airs on the Science Channel.

== Series overview ==
Season	Episodes	Originally aired		Game statistics		
Season	Episodes	Season premiere	Season finale	Prey victories	Prey captured	Percentage captured
1	9	April 12, 2006	June 7, 2006	5	13	72.22%
2	8	May 30, 2007	August 20, 2007	5	11	68.75%
3	10	June 9, 2008	September 29, 2008	5	15	75.00%
4	8	July 26, 2009	September 16, 2009	6	10	62.50%
5	12	September 6, 2010	November 21, 2010			
6	12	April 17, 2011	August, 2011			
7	13	May 21, 2012	August 27, 2012			

== Episodes ==
=== Season 1 (2006) ===
No. overall	No. in season	Title	Location	Original release date
1	1	"Jeff & Magnus"	Alberta	April 12, 2006
The premiere of Mantracker takes place in the ranch province of Alberta, Canada. Prey Magnus Mulliner and Jeff Bremner attempt to reach their destination 40 km away while eluding capture from Mantracker, in his home province, and his sidekick TJ Maynard.
2	2	"Liisa & Nicolina"	Ontario	April 12, 2006
Prey Nicolina Lanni and Liisa McMillan seek to avoid capture from their two male captors, including sidekick Sandy Ross, during their thirty-six-hour race through the forests of Ontario.
3	3	"Jim & Nicola"	Yukon	April 19, 2006
The third episode of Mantracker pits Nicola Stephenson and Jim McKelvey against Mantracker and sidekick Chuck Hume through the Canadian Rockies in Yukon.
4	4	"Russ & Susie"	Yukon	May 3, 2006
The episode takes place in Yukon once more, although with a different set of prey this time. Russ Giesbrecht and Susie Rogan race through 55 km of "unforgivable territory" which Mantracker and his local guide Chuck Hume have to put up with as well in order to capture their prey.
5	5	"Mike & Neela"	Yukon	May 10, 2006
Mantracker takes place in Yukon for the third consecutive time, as Mike Tribes and German Neela Free fight to beat Mantracker in their home turf in the midst of a storm. Mantracker employs the same guide. Chuck Hume, as before.
6	6	"Vlad & Nate"	Alberta	May 17, 2006
Mantracker and sidekick TJ Maynard have to capture commandos Nate Brooks and Vladimir Rybicka, a machinist who once made booby traps, somewhere during their 52 km run that takes place in Alberta.
7	7	"Jim & Dara Lee"	Ontario	May 24, 2006
Jim Hicks and Dara Lee Masters are in Ontario’s far north to battle it out against their two trackers, one of whom is guide Sandy Ross, who appears for the second time in the show.
8	8	"Luke & Mike"	Ontario	May 31, 2006
The penultimate episode of Mantracker is held in Ontario, where prey Luke Wakerly and Mike Sutton, both in their thirties, set out to reach their destination 43 km away. They must at the same time be on the lookout for Mantracker and sidekick Sandy Ross.
9	9	"Julio & Joe"	Yukon	June 7, 2006
In a special hour-long season finale, Joe Bishop, a wilderness guide, and Julio Gutierrez, an extreme wrestler, do battle in Yukon Territory as they seek to escape capture from their two trackers, Mantracker and local guide Chuck Hume.

=== Season 2 (2007) ===
No. overall	No. in season	Title	Location	Original release date
10	1	"Chris & Brock"	British Columbia	May 30, 2007
Urban dwellers Chris Borkowski and Brock Herbert are up in the mountainous country of British Columbia, the first time the show takes place in the province. Mantracker partners with Neil Carey as they attempt to capture the two prey in season two's premiere.
11	2	"Shannon & Stephanie"	Alberta	June 18, 2007
Back in Mantracker's home province of Alberta, buddies * Shannon Leroux and Stephanie Bigras seek to prove their mettle against their main tracker and his sidekick Curtis Hallock, a native of the land.
12	3	"Dustin & Ian"	Alberta	June 25, 2007
Canadian native Curtis Hallock return to pair up with Mantracker as they put in utmost effort to capture their prey, coming in the form of Ontarians Dustin Demille and Ian Lawson, childhood friends and Ultimate Frisbee players.
13	4	"Brent & Brian"	Yukon	July 23, 2007
With thirty-six hours to cover 42 km, Brian Aziz, who is ten years senior to fellow firefighter Brent Kirchner, will look to victory for the duo in Yukon. The race is not as simple, as Mantracker and scout Rob Knorr are in to hunt them down.
14	5	"Erica & Kendall"	Yukon	July 30, 2007
The fifth episode of the season involve sisters-in-law Erica Vanbriel and Kendall Harris. Both reside in Vancouver, British Columbia, but the race does not. Mantracker pairs up with his first ever female sidekick Joni MacKinnon in their bid to capture the two in Yukon.
15	6	"Brian & Samantha"	Algonquin, Ontario	August 6, 2007
Romantic partners Brian Robinson and Samantha Lefebvre form the youngest prey team of the season. However, they cannot allow their age to downplay their chances in their race against Mantracker and his guide Phil Lemieux.
16	7	"Dan & Jared"	Columbia Valley, British Columbia	August 13, 2007
Mantracker is back in his action, this time to wage war against United States Marine Dan Chase and advanced kick boxer Jared Payne. The two "polar opposite strangers" have to work well with each other so as to win their battle. Neil Carey is the local advisor to Mantracker in the episode.
17	8	"Steve & Jeff"	Ontario	August 20, 2007
For the first time, the urban landscape factors in Mantracker's hunt. In the season's finale, he hopes to be able to get at Olympic athletes Steve Omischl and Jeff Bean in his partnership with Phil Lemieux, who helps out for the second time in the show.

=== Season 3 (2008) ===
No. overall	No. in season	Title	Location	Original release date
18	1	"Al & Garfield"	Deerhurst, Ontario	June 9, 2008
Al St. Louis, a motivational speaker in Toronto, and Garfield Thompson a janitor and university student in Toronto try to evade Mantracker as they make their way through the northlands of Ontario in and around the Deerhurst area.
19	2	"Simone & Mike"	Northern British Columbia	June 16, 2008
Simone Crook, a tree planter in British Columbia and Mike Sage a film maker from Toronto, Ontario try to escape Mantracker and his sidekick, Mark Fletcher.
20	3	"Jesse & Nathan"	Saskatchewan	June 23, 2008
Nathan McGuire a retail supervisor and Jesse Tomes a musician both of Hamilton, Ontario find themselves running through the Badlands of Saskatchewan trying to escape capture by Mantracker and his sidekick, Michael Burgess.
21	4	"Rob & Michelle"	Nova Scotia	June 30, 2008
Two cousins; Michelle Killam a social worker/triathalete from Mira, Nova Scotia and Rob Donovan a Grave digger and nature enthusiast from Sydney Mines, Nova Scotia join forces trying to avoid capture by Mantracker and his sidekick Louis Burke in the Cape Breton Highlands.
22	5	"Mark & Taylor"	Ontario	July 28, 2008
Mark Daub a Utility contractor from Blind River, Ontario and a utility pole installer - Taylor Vanravenswaay from Fenwick, Ontario meet up to try to evade capture from the Mantracker and his sidekick Phil Lemieux in the Algoma country of Northern Ontario.
23	6	"Bruce & Sabrina"	British Columbia	August 4, 2008
Bruce Chandler is a guide and bush labourer who along with his cousin Sabrina Croft, a Landfill Supervisor from Chilliwack, British Columbia find themselves in Northern British Columbia trying to evade capture by Mantracker and his sidekick Jake Giguere.
24	7	"Buck & RJ"	Saskatchewan	September 8, 2008
Richard "RJ" Johnson and David "Buck" Goodbrand, both are policemen in Barrie, Ontario. They find themselves in rugged territory battling all types of ground in the Badlands of Saskatchewan while trying to evade capture by Mantracker and his sidekick Lane Burgess.
25	8	"Jordan & Suzie"	Sainte-Agathe, Quebec	September 15, 2008
Suzie Willis, a student from Halifax, Nova Scotia and Jordan Tibbo a Youth Worker from Yarmouth, Nova Scotia. The dating couple team up and try to evade capture from Mantracker and his sidekick Daniel Locas in the Laurentian Mountains.
26	9	"Josh & Kyle"	Ontario	September 22, 2008
Josh Johnston a IT Support Agent from Trenton, Ontario and Kyle Geerkins a TV news tech supporter from Stirling, Ontario team up to try to foil and evade Mantracker and his sidekick Phil Lemieux.
27	10	"Kaleigh & Alana"	Smithers, British Columbia	September 29, 2008
Kaleigh Allen, a student and basketball allstar along with her sister; Alana Wadley, a Wilderness Lodge employee and outdoor guide both from Smithers, British Columbia try to evade Mantracker and his sidekick Jake Giguere in the mountains surrounding their community.

=== Season 4 (2009) ===
The fourth season premiered on July 26, 2009 on OLN, with an encore on August 1, 2009.

No. overall	No. in season	Title	Location	Original release date
28	1	"Billy and The Rev"	Big Bear, California	July 26, 2009
Billy Ivey, an ex football star who calls Running Springs, California his home. Rich White - The Reverend - a snowboard instructor and freelance writer calls Big Bear Lake, California his home. They tackle the mountains and back country of Big Bear Lake, California in their attempt to evade the Mantracker and his sidekick Mark Murphy.
29	2	"Jessica & Lauren"	Big White, British Columbia	August 5, 2009
Jessica, a fitness instructor and part time pinup model, and her sister Lauren Phillips, an aspiring opera singer and military reservist are both from Toronto, Ontario. They are taking their chances in the mountains surrounding Big White, British Columbia, as they try to evade capture from Mantracker and his sidekick Tim Van Dyke a local guide in the area.
30	3	"Rene & Dave"	Big River, Saskatchewan	August 12, 2009
Brothers and business partners Rene and Dave Frey from Toronto, Ontario as they bush-wack their way through rugged terrain in an attempt to avoid capture by Mantracker and his sidekick Gord Vandeland.
31	4	"Chelsea & Trev"	Big Bear, California	August 19, 2009
Trev Pelzer an Entrepreneur from Portland, Oregon and Chelsea Redwood an office manager from Big Bear, California find themselves trying to avoid capture by Mantracker and his sidekick Mark Murphy in the San Bernardino Mountains in California.
32	5	"Andrew & Hainsley"	Ontario	August 26, 2009
Hainsley Guthrie and Andrew Oosterhuis, both of Toronto, Ontario find themselves fighting the terrain and bush-wack their way around Elliott Lake as they try to evade capture by the Mantracker and his sidekick Phil Lemieux who is a return guide for Mantracker.
33	6	"Brian & Julie"	British Columbia	September 2, 2009
Brian Hames who is a MTO officer from Orangeville, Ontario and his sister; Julie Hames-Smith a customer service agent from Georgetown, Ontario find themselves in the wilds of British Columbia as they try to evade Mantracker and his assistant; Brian Elliot.
34	7	"Tommy & Steve"	Newfoundland	September 9, 2009
Steve Cave, an Auto Financing Manager and Tommy Humphrey an Auto Salesman, both from Corner Brook, Newfoundland find themselves trying to evade capture in the foothills of the long range mountains of Newfoundland. Mantracker and his sidekick Kevin Stacey are tracking down their prey.
35	8	"Mike & Adam"	North Bay, Ontario	September 16, 2009
Brothers-in-law Mike Boisvert, a Science Professor from London, Ontario and Adam Cross, a teacher from Burlington, Ontario tough it out in the bush surrounding North Bay, Ontario trying to avoid capture by Mantracker and his sidekick Barry Cuen.

=== Season 5 (2010) ===
The series was renewed for a fifth season on August 11, 2010.

No. overall	No. in season	Title	Location	Original release date
36	1	"Road Hammers"	Elliot Lake, Ontario	September 6, 2010
Season premiere of Mantracker season five features country music stars Clayton Bellamy and Jason McCoy as the prey. As part of the successful band The Road Hammers, they find themselves in the wilderness around Elliot Lake, Ontario as they try to evade Mantracker and his sidekick Phil Lemieux
37	2	"Blake & Layney"	Big Bear, California	September 13, 2010
Blake Hudson, an attorney from Los Angeles, California along with his partner for the chase, Layney DeLange, a postal worker in Big Bear, California, find themselves being tracked by Mantracker and his guide Mark Murphy through the high desert near Big Bear.
38	3	"Amy & Barb"	Grande Cache, Alberta	September 20, 2010
Amy Thompson, a Dental Hygenist and Barb Butler - both are from Elnora, Alberta. They join forces to try to evade capture from Mantracker and his sidekick Curtis Hallock as they run through the wilds near Grande Cache, Alberta
39	4	"Ryder & Brendyn"	Temagami, Ontario	September 27, 2010
Brendyn Zachary, a Web Developer and his brother Ryder Britton, a Biology student. Both are from Toronto, Ontario. This duo find themselves in the backcountry of Northern Ontario. As Mantracker and his sidekick, Barry Keown are on the hunt once again.
40	5	"Max & Barb"	Quesnel, British Columbia	October 4, 2010
This time around, Mantracker is facing a mother/son duo. Barb Ohl, a realtor and artist from Vancouver, British Columbia and her son Max Clough a nightclub security officer who is also from Vancouver. Helping Mantracker this time around is Martin Dillabough whom is familiar with the wild Cariboo Country that they will be chasing in.
41	6	"Chris & Shawn"	Big Island, Hawaii	October 11, 2010
For the first time, Mantracker is on the Big Island of Hawaii. Chris Arruda, a hiking and treking guide and buddy Shawn Pila a student and musician, both from Hilo, Hawaii. Mantracker and his sidekick Leon Chow have to fight their way through dense underbrush and varied country to track down the duo.
42	7	"Angie & Nolan"	Elliot Lake, Ontario	October 18, 2010
Nolan Lederman, a bartender and martial arts enthusiast and his partner for the race, Angela Fice, a mom and a Martial Arts Club Owner, both are from Bowmanville, Ontario. The duo want to take on Mantracker and his sidekick Phil Lemieux, as they find themselves trying to evade capture in the dense woods around Elliot Lake, Ontario.
43	8	"Dylan & Travis"	Quesnel, British Columbia	October 25, 2010
Dylan Kenin from Taos, New Mexico and his race partner Travis Hammer, another actor from Alton, Illinois came to the wilderness of central British Columbia between Wells, British Columbia and Barkerville, British Columbia to take on Mantracker and his sidekick Martin Dillabough.
44	9	"Pete & Cam"	Grande Cache, Alberta	November 1, 2010
Peter Stewart, a tree planter and a Welder, Cam Daye-Trottier. Both of them are from Toronto, Ontario and are there to challenge Mantracker and his sidekick Curtis Hallock.
45	10	"Steph & Kristy"	Big Bear, California	November 7, 2010
Kristy Breault, and her friend Stephanie Hickey are legal secretaries and they both reside in Los Angeles, California. Both ladies are up for the challenge of tackling the rugged Mohave Desert in their efforts of evading capture from Mantracter and his sidekick Mark Murphy.
46	11	"Ben & Darrell"	Temagami, Ontario	November 14, 2010
Darrell Burke and Benjamin Benhan both work at the Department of National Defence and make Toronto, Ontario their home. They are eager to take on Mantracker and his sidekick Barry Keown in their attempt to reach the finish line before they are captured.
47	12	"Tim & Miah"	Big Island, Hawaii	November 21, 2010
Once again, Mantracker finds himself on the Big Island, Hawaii with his sidekick Leon Chow. This time they are tracking down Jeremiah Redins a kiteboard instructor and kayak guide from Kihei, Hawaii along with Tim Lara a Kayak Guide and Surf Instructor from Haiku, Hawaii.

=== Season 6 (2011) ===
No. overall	No. in season	Title	Location	Original release date
48	1	"Shane & Brook"	Gold Bridge, British Columbia	April 17, 2011
Brothers, Brook and Shane Doan. Brook is an electrician from Halkirk, Alberta and his more famous brother, Shane Doan - an NHL hockey player. Neither guy is afraid of hard work due to their farm life growing up but we will see how they fare up against Mantracker and his sidekick Russ Floyd as they trek through the Chilcotin Mountains in British Columbia
49	2	"Jennifer & Amiee"	Crowsnest Pass, Alberta	April 24, 2011
Amiee Roberge, a Massage Therapist and her twin sister Jennifer Roberge, a Luxury Car Sales Associate, both are from Moosejaw, Saskatchewan. They are taking on Mantracker and his side kick Joe Trotz in the wilds of the Crowsnest Pass.
50	3	"Wes & Jamie"	Dove Creek, Colorado	May 1, 2011
This time around Mantracker finds himself south of the border once again, this time, Colorado. Not for Americans but for Albertans that are also south for this episode. Wesley Blinkhorn, an Oil Purchasing Rep and his brother Jamie, a Teacher, both brothers are from Sylvan Lake, Alberta. This time around though, Mantracker's sidekick is a local outfitter and rancher, Scott Cox.
51	4	"Melanie & Reza"	Porcupine Hills, Alberta	May 8, 2011
Melanie Francoeur-Sauriol is a nurse in Fort Coulonge, Quebec. Her partner for the race is Reza Celik, a pro wrestler from London, Ontario. Mantracker and his sidekick Flint Lucas
52	5	"Priscilla & Colt"	Thunder Bay, Ontario	May 15, 2011
This time around the married couple of Colt and Priscilla Sullivan are from Dallas, Texas. Priscilla is a Massage Therapist, Colt, an Accountant. They are up in Thunder Bay to take on Mantracker and his sidekick Greg Huffman.
53	6	"Rusty & Klumpy"	Dove Creek, Colorado	May 22, 2011
Mantracker is back in Colorado. Matthew Klumpenhouwer is a Workplace Safety Inspector and his friend David Ellison a Dairy Farmer. Both of these guys are from Listowel, Ontario and are better known by the knicknames of Klumpy and Rusty, respectively. Mantracker's sidekick this time around is James Garnett.
54	7	"Alex & Dion"	Thunder Bay, Ontario	May 27, 2011
Friends since High School, Dione Whyte, a Sustainable Services Manager from Sechelt, British Columbia and Alex Blais, an Anaesthesiology Resident from Vancouver, British Columbia. The two of them are there to take on Mantracker and his sidekick Greg Huffman through the surrounding wilds of Thunder Bay.
55	8	"Justin & Kyle"	Prince Albert, Saskatchewan	June 5, 2011
Justin Lukach, a tv host from Port Coquitlam, British Columbia and his cousin Kyle Lukach, a Factory Worker from Waterford, Ontario team up to try to take Mantracker and his sidekick Gord Vandeland down in the wilds around Prince Albert, Saskatchewan.
56	9	"Warren & Margriet"	Castle Dale, Utah	TBA
This time there is a newly married husband and wife duo, Warren Mullenix, a General Contractor and Margriet Gradeinus, an Emergency Physician, both reside in Calgary, Alberta. The couple are eager to take on Mantracker and his sidekick Brock Winn, in the wilds of Utah.
57	10	"Mike & Becka"	Gold Bridge, British Columbia	December 27, 2011
Mike and Becka are long time boyfriend. Mike Hossack, a student and Becka Hazel, also a student are looking forward to taking this on. Mantracker and his sidekick Russ Floyd are back in the Chilcotin mountains in British Columbia.
58	11	"Robert & Mike"	Castle Dale, Utah	TBA
59	12	"Jesse & Justin"	Sault Ste. Marie, Ontario	TBA

=== Season 7 (2012) ===
Mantracker was renewed for a seventh season, that premiered on May 21, 2012. Chad Savage Lenz was announced as the new mantracker at the end of the premiere episode.

No. overall	No. in season	Title	Location	Original release date
60	TBA	"Searching for Mantracker"	TBA	May 21, 2012
61	1	"Huck & Andy"	Crowsnest Pass, Alberta	May 28, 2012
62	2	"Mercedes & Jessie"	Elliot Lake, Ontario	June 4, 2012
63	3	"Zap & Andrew"	Florida	June 11, 2012
64	4	"Les & Tyler"	Barriere, British Columbia	June 18, 2012
65	5	"Carla & Amanda"	Crowsnest Pass, Alberta	June 25, 2012
66	6	"Brandon & Seth"	Big Island, Hawaii	July 2, 2012
67	7	"Randi & Stacey"	Central Ontario	July 9, 2012
68	8	"Scottie & Steven"	Myakka River State Park, Florida	July 16, 2012
69	9	"Mike & Ryan"	Sault Ste Marie, Ontario	July 23, 2012
70	10	"Renee & Kiani"	Big Island, Hawaii	July 31, 2012
71	11	"Jake & Nick"	Northern Ontario	August 6, 2012
72	12	"Shaun & Vanessa"	Northern British Columbia	August 27, 2012
