= Wheels (The Road Hammers album) =

Studio album by The Road Hammers
- Released: June 3, 2014
- Genre: Country rock
- Length: 41:14
- Label: Open Road

The Road Hammers chronology
| The Road Hammers II (2009) | Wheels (2014) | The Squeeze (2017) |

Singles from Wheels
- 1. "Get On Down the Road" Released: October 2013; 2. "Mud" Released: February 2014; 3. "I've Been Everywhere" Released: September 2014; 4. "Hillbilly Highway" Released: January 2015

Professional ratings
Review scores
| Source | Rating |
|---|---|
| Top Country | 4.5/5 stars |

Wheels is the third studio album by Canadian country music group The Road Hammers. Released on June 3, 2014, via Open Road Recordings, the album includes the singles "Get On Down the Road", "Mud" and "I've Been Everywhere".

== Critical reception ==
Shenieka Russell-Metcalf of Top Country gave the album four and a half stars out of five, writing that "they have managed to infuse southern rock and country perfectly" and "this album is packed with eleven tracks that are more than worth the wait."

== Track listing ==
| No. | Title | Writer(s) | Length |
|---|---|---|---|
| 1. | "Wheels" | Scott Baggett, Jason McCoy, Jeffrey Steele | 3:40 |
| 2. | "I've Been Everywhere" | Geoff Mack | 4:18 |
| 3. | "Mud" (featuring Jeffrey Steele) | Baggett, McCoy, Steele | 3:01 |
| 4. | "Get On Down the Road" | David Lee Murphy, Rivers Rutherford, Chuck Wicks | 3:15 |
| 5. | "Rollin' of a Ramblin' Man" | Willie Mack, McCoy | 2:52 |
| 6. | "Hillbilly Highway" (featuring Colt Ford) | Steve Earle, Jimmy Hinson | 4:11 |
| 7. | "Roll On Down the Highway" (featuring Fred Turner) | Randy Bachman, Fred Turner | 4:14 |
| 8. | "You're My Highway" | Clayton Bellamy, Chris Byrne, Mack, McCoy | 2:47 |
| 9. | "Wide Open" | Gilles Godard, Mack, McCoy | 3:32 |
| 10. | "Annie" | Bellamy, Byrne, McCoy | 6:19 |
| 11. | "Fender Benders" | Baggett, Bellamy, Byrne, McCoy | 3:05 |
| Total length: | | | 41:14 |

== Chart performance ==
=== Album ===
| Chart (2014) | Peak position |
|---|---|
| Canadian Albums (Billboard) | 21 |

=== Singles ===
| Year | Single | Peak chart positions | |
| Year | Single | CAN Country | CAN |
|---|---|---|---|
| 2013 | "Get On Down the Road" | 12 | 82 |
| 2014 | "Mud" | 16 | 68 |
| 2014 | "I've Been Everywhere" | 27 | — |
| 2015 | "Hillbilly Highway" | 43 | — |
"—" denotes releases that did not chart
