= Mud (song) =

2014 song by The Road Hammers

Single by The Road Hammers featuring Jeffrey Steele

from the album Wheels
- Released: February 25, 2014
- Genre: Country
- Length: 3:00
- Label: Open Road
- Songwriters: Scott Baggett; Jason McCoy; Jeffrey Steele
- Producers: Scott Baggett; Jason McCoy

The Road Hammers singles chronology
"Get on Down the Road" (2013)	"Mud" (2014)	"I've Been Everywhere" (2014)

Music video
- "Mud" on YouTube

"Mud" is a song recorded by Canadian country rock band The Road Hammers featuring American country music artist Jeffrey Steele. The band's frontman Jason McCoy wrote the song with Steele and Scott Baggett. It was the second single from The Road Hammers' third studio album Wheels.

== Background ==
"Mud" is sung from the perspective of a man who recounts how mud has impacted his life. It begins with him playing with a Tonka truck in the mud as a child, before progressing to him buying his first truck as a teenager and going off-roading in the mud.

== Commercial performance ==
"Mud" reached a peak of number 16 on the Billboard Canada Country chart during the week of July 19, 2014. One week later, "Mud" reached a peak of number 68 on the all-genre Canadian Hot 100, marking The Road Hammers' highest charting single there. The song was certified Gold by Music Canada in 2014, and later achieved Platinum status in 2020.

== Music video ==
The official music video for "Mud" premiered on February 17, 2014. The video was filmed at the Central Alberta Race Track in Rimbey, Alberta. The video was directed by Margaret Malandruccolo, and required the use of 40 trucks to create enough mud after a rainfall.

== Credits and personnel ==
Credits adapted from Apple Music.

- Scott Baggett — keyboards, guitar, harmonica, tambourine, production
- Clayton Bellamy — background vocals
- Pat Buchanan — guitar
- Chris Byrne — background vocals, bass guitar
- Chad Cromwell — drums
- Mike Johnson — banjo
- Jason McCoy — vocals, production
- Jeffrey Steele — featured vocals

== Charts ==
Chart performance for "Mud"
Chart (2014)	Peak position
Canada (Canadian Hot 100)	68
Canada Country (Billboard)	16

== Certifications ==
Region	Certification	Certified units/sales
Canada (Music Canada)	Platinum	80,000^{‡}
^{‡} Sales+streaming figures based on certification alone.
