= Drew Shalka =

Canadian musician

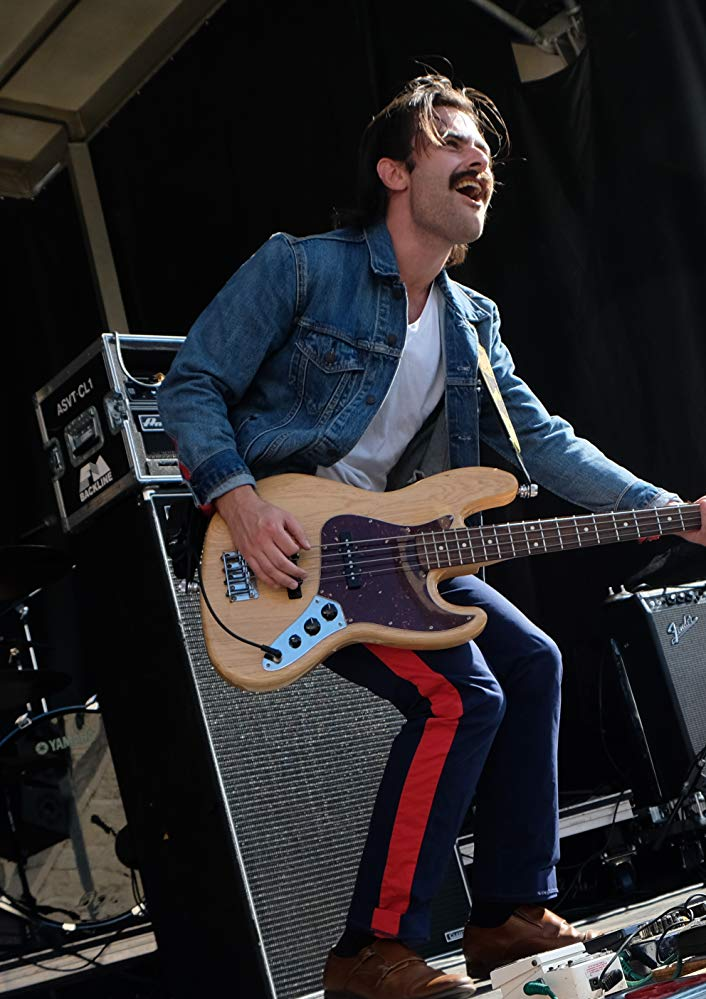
- Shalka performing with FKB in 2019
- Born: March 1, 1995 (age 31); Bonnyville, Alberta, Canada
- Occupations: Singer; songwriter
- Years active: 2009–present
- Musical career
- Genres: Rock; pop; alternative rock
- Instruments: Vocals; guitar; piano; keyboards; bass
- Member of: FKB
- Website: fkbmusic.ca

Edward Drew Shalka (born March 1, 1995), known professionally as Drew Shalka, is a Canadian singer, multi-instrumentalist, and songwriter. He is the lead vocalist and bassist of the Canadian rock band FKB. He was nominated for a Juno Award for Distant Danger by Nuela Charles.

== Early life ==
Edward Drew Shalka was born on March 1, 1995, in Bonnyville, Alberta. He joined the band FKB as lead vocalist and bassist while he was in high school in 2009. Growing up he was heavily influenced by the music of The Beatles, The Beach Boys, and Elvis Presley.

== Musical career ==
Shalka's career in music began with FKB when he met Derek Chalut at school. The band attracted local notoriety and caught the attention of singer-songwriter Clayton Bellamy of the Canadian country band The Road Hammers at a car show in late 2012. Bellamy became interested in their music and co-wrote and produced their first EP 123 FKB. Following the release in 2014, the band would go on to perform hundreds of shows across Canada and the United States supporting acts including The Trews, Bif Naked, Mother Mother, Dear Rouge, The Road Hammers, Dan Davidson, Pop Evil, and Scott Helman.

In 2017, FKB released the single "Bright Lights" accompanied by a music video and tour of Canada and the United States. They followed this with the single and music video for "My Bedroom" in January 2018 along with another string of Western Canadian tour dates. In July 2018, they released another single with a music video titled "Casual Love" on KnightVision Records.

Shalka co-wrote the single "Danger" released by Canadian singer-songwriter Nuela Charles in 2018. The song reached top 10 on CBC Music and was on Charles' Juno Award nominated album Distant Danger. The single and album won "Pop Recording of the Year" and "Album of the Year" respectively at the Edmonton Music Awards in 2019.

In late 2019, Shalka and the other members of FKB all portrayed themselves and performed their song "My Bedroom" in the film Moments in Spacetime.

== Awards and nominations ==
Year	Organization	Award	Nominee/Work	Result
2018	Edmonton Music Awards	Adult Alternative Recording of the Year	Bright Lights	Nominated
2019	Juno Awards	Adult Contemporary Album of the Year	Distant Danger	Nominated
2019	Edmonton Music Awards	Pop Recording of the Year	Danger	Won
2019	Edmonton Music Awards	Album of the Year	Distant Danger	Won

== Discography ==
=== Songwriting and performance credits ===
Title	Year	Artist	Album	Credits	Written with	Producer
"Crystal Ball"	2014	FKB	123 FKB	Co-writer/Lead Vocals/Bass/Keyboards	Clayton Bellamy, Zackery Moon, Zachary Fontaine, Derek Chalut	Clayton Bellamy
"Turn on the Lights"	2014	FKB	123 FKB	Co-writer/Lead Vocals/Bass	Clayton Bellamy, Zackery Moon, Zachary Fontaine, Derek Chalut	Clayton Bellamy
"She Thinks She's the Only One"	2014	FKB	123 FKB	Co-writer/Lead Vocals/Bass	Clayton Bellamy, Zackery Moon, Zachary Fontaine, Derek Chalut	Clayton Bellamy
"Take Me Home"	2014	FKB	123 FKB	Co-writer/Lead Vocals/Bass	Clayton Bellamy, Zackery Moon, Zachary Fontaine, Derek Chalut	Clayton Bellamy
"123 FKB"	2014	FKB	123 FKB	Co-writer/Lead Vocals/Bass	Clayton Bellamy, Zackery Moon, Zachary Fontaine, Derek Chalut	Clayton Bellamy
"Bright Lights"	2017	FKB	Bright Lights	Co-writer/Lead Vocals/Keyboards/Guitar	Travis Topylki, Derek Chalut, Zachary Fontaine	Clayton Bellamy
"My Bedroom"	2018	FKB	My Bedroom	Co-writer/Lead Vocals/Bass/Keyboards/Guitar	Travis Topylki, Derek Chalut, Zachary Fontaine	Clayton Bellamy
"Casual Love"	2018	FKB	Casual Love	Co-writer/Lead Vocals/Bass/Keyboards/Guitar	Travis Topylki, Derek Chalut, Zachary Fontaine	Clayton Bellamy
"Danger"	2018	Nuela Charles	Distant Danger	Co-writer	Nuela Charles, Brandon Unis, Brad Simons, Ryan Worsley	Ryan Worsley
"Backseat Daydream"	2019	FKB	Backseat Daydream	Co-writer/Lead Vocals/Keyboards/Guitar/Backing Vocals	Clayton Bellamy, Travis Topylki, Derek Chalut, Zachary Fontaine	Clayton Bellamy
"Glow"	2020	FKB	Glow	Co-writer/Lead Vocals/Bass/Keyboards/Guitar/Backing Vocals	Clayton Bellamy, Dan Davidson	Clayton Bellamy and Dan Davidson
