= FKB =

FKB may refer to:

- The Flying Karamazov Brothers, an American performance troupe
- French King Bridge, in Massachusetts, United States
- Karlsruhe/Baden-Baden Airport, in Germany
- FKB (band), a Canadian rock band
