= The Road Hammers II =

Studio album by The Road Hammers
- Released: February 24, 2009
- Genre: Country rock
- Length: 40:38
- Label: Open Road
- Producer: Scott Baggett; Jason McCoy

The Road Hammers chronology
The Road Hammers (2005)	The Road Hammers II (2009)	Wheels (2014)

Singles from The Road Hammers II
- 1. "Homegrown" Released: November 17, 2008; 2. "I've Got the Scars to Prove It" Released: April 6, 2009; 3. "Goodbye Dust" Released: August 24, 2009

The Road Hammers II is the second studio album of Canadian country rock group The Road Hammers. It was released on February 24, 2009 on Open Road Recordings. The album also includes the three Michael Knox-produced tracks that were added to the 2008 United States-version of their debut release titled Blood, Sweat and Steel ("I Don't Know When to Quit," "Workin' Hard at Lovin' You" and "I've Got the Scars to Prove It").

== Track listing ==
No.	Title	Writer(s)	Length
1.	"Homegrown"	Chris Byrne, Larry Haack, Jason McCoy, Bobby Taylor	3:06
2.	"Gettin' Screwed"	Clayton Bellamy, Byrne, Corbett Frasz, McCoy, Robert Ellis Orrall	3:20
3.	"I Don't Know When to Quit"	Ashley Gorley, Bryan Simpson	3:19
4.	"Cowboy 'Til I Die"	Bellamy, Willie Mack, McCoy	3:28
5.	"Workin' Hard at Lovin' You"	Byron Hill, Vicky McGehee, John Rich	3:36
6.	"I've Got the Scars to Prove It"	Haack, McCoy, Taylor	3:33
7.	"Thank God I'm a Country Boy"	John Martin Sommers	2:56
8.	"Freewheelin'"	Bart Allmand, Danny Myrick, Kip Raines, Jeffrey Steele	3:55
9.	"No Time for Long Goodbyes"	McCoy, Mike Plume	3:27
10.	"Goodbye Dust"	Bellamy, Byrne, Mack, McCoy	4:27
11.	"A Girl Who Loves to Truck"	Bellamy, Byrne, Mack	2:31

== Chart performance ==
=== Singles ===
Year	Single	Peak positions
Year	Single	CAN
2008	"Homegrown"	87
2009	"I've Got the Scars to Prove It"	86
2009	"Goodbye Dust"	—
"—" denotes releases that did not chart
