= Welcome to My World (Dean Martin album) =

Studio album by Dean Martin
- Released: July 1967
- Recorded: December 22, 1964, December 11, 1966, June 23, 1967
- Genres: Traditional pop, country
- Length: 29:28
- Label: Reprise - R/RS 6250
- Producer: Jimmy Bowen

Dean Martin chronology
Happiness Is Dean Martin (1967)	Welcome to My World (1967)	Gentle on My Mind (1968)

Welcome to My World is the twenty-fourth studio album by Dean Martin. The album was released after the unexpected success of the singles "In the Chapel in the Moonlight" and "Little Ole Wine Drinker Me". "In the Chapel in the Moonlight" had previously been released on Dean Martin Hits Again, and the title track, "Welcome to My World", had appeared previously on the 1965 album (Remember Me) I'm the One Who Loves You.

This was the second album that Martin released in 1967. Welcome to My World peaked at 20 on the Billboard 200. It was reissued on CD by Hip-O Records in 2009.

"In the Chapel in the Moonlight" topped the Adult Contemporary Chart, and peaked at 25 on the Billboard Hot 100, while "Little Ole Wine Drinker Me" peaked at 5 on the Adult Contemporary Chart and 38 on the Billboard Hot 100.

== Reception ==
Professional ratings
Review scores
Source	Rating
Allmusic	3/5 stars

William Ruhlmann on Allmusic.com gave the album three stars out of five. Referring to Reprise's propensity to reissue material he commented that it "may have been another of Reprise's mix-and-match Martin LPs, but it was a successful one, restoring a measure of his commercial clout".

== Track listing ==
1. "In the Chapel in the Moonlight" (Billy Hill) – 2:34
2. "Release Me (And Let Me Love Again)" (Eddie Miller, Dub Williams, Robert Yount) – 3:14
3. "I Can't Help Remembering You" (Jimmy Bowen, Bert Kaempfert, Herbert Rehbein)
4. "Turn to Me" (Michiko Kusiki, Ted Snyder)
5. "Wallpaper Roses" (Harold Spina)
6. "Little Ole Wine Drinker, Me" (Tommy "Snuff" Garrett, Dick Jennings, Hank Mills)
7. "Green, Green Grass of Home" (Curly Putman)
8. "A Place in the Shade" (Baker Knight)
9. "Pride" (Irene Stanton, Wayne Walker)
10. "Welcome to My World" (Johnny Hathcock, Ray Winkler)

== Personnel ==
- Dean Martin – vocals
- Jimmy Bowen – producer
- Bill Justis, Billy Strange, H.B. Barnum, Ernie Freeman – arrangements
