= The Squeeze (album) =

Studio album by The Road Hammers
- Released: May 12, 2017
- Genre: Country rock
- Label: Open Road
- Producer: Gavin Brown, Scott Baggett, Jason McCoy, David Kalmusky

The Road Hammers chronology
Wheels (2014)	The Squeeze (2017)

Singles from The Squeeze
- 1. "One Horse Town"; 2. "Crazy About You"; 3. "Your Love Is The Drug"; 4. "All Your Favorite Bands"

The Squeeze is the fourth studio album by Canadian country music group The Road Hammers. It was released on May 12, 2017 via Open Road Recordings. The album includes the singles "One Horse Town", "Crazy About You" and "Your Love is the Drug".

== Track listing ==
No.	Title	Writer(s)	Length
1.	"Your Love Is The Drug"	Jason McCoy, Gavin Brown, Chris Byrne
2.	"The Squeeze"	McCoy, Andrew Petroff, Byrne, Clayton Bellamy
3.	"All Your Favorite Bands"	Taylor Goldsmith, Jonny Fritz
4.	"Crazy About You"	McCoy, Byrne, Bellamy
5.	"Party Girl"	McCoy, Scott Baggett, Jeffrey Steele
6.	"Down and Dirty"	McCoy, Baggett, Jeff Coplan
7.	"Detroit Alison"	McCoy, Byrne, Mike Little
8.	"Haulin' Ass"	McCoy, Byrne
9.	"Easy Rider"	McCoy, Petroff, Beckwith York
10.	"One Horse Town" (Featuring Tim Hicks)	McCoy, Tim Hicks

== Singles ==
Year	Single	Peak chart positions
Year	Single	CAN Country
2015	"One Horse Town (featuring Tim Hicks)"	41
2017	"Crazy About You"	7
2017	"Your Love Is the Drug"	28
2018	"All Your Favorite Bands"	—
"—" denotes releases that did not chart
