= One Horse Town =

One Horse Town may refer to:

Songs

- "One Horse Town", a 1976 song by Elton John from the album Blue Moves
- "One Horse Town" (The Thrills song), 2003
- "One Horse Town", a 1993 song by the Johner Brothers from the album My Brother and Me
- "One Horse Town", a 2012 song by Blackberry Smoke from the album The Whippoorwill
- "One Horse Town", a 2015 song by the Road Hammers from the album The Squeeze

Albums

- One-Horse Town, a 2005 album by Jim Henry

Places

- One Horse Town, California, a mining town in Shasta County, California
- One-Horse Town, early name of Norco, California

Other

- One Horse Town (1968 film), 1968 animated cartoon starring Woody Woodpecker
