= FKB (band) =

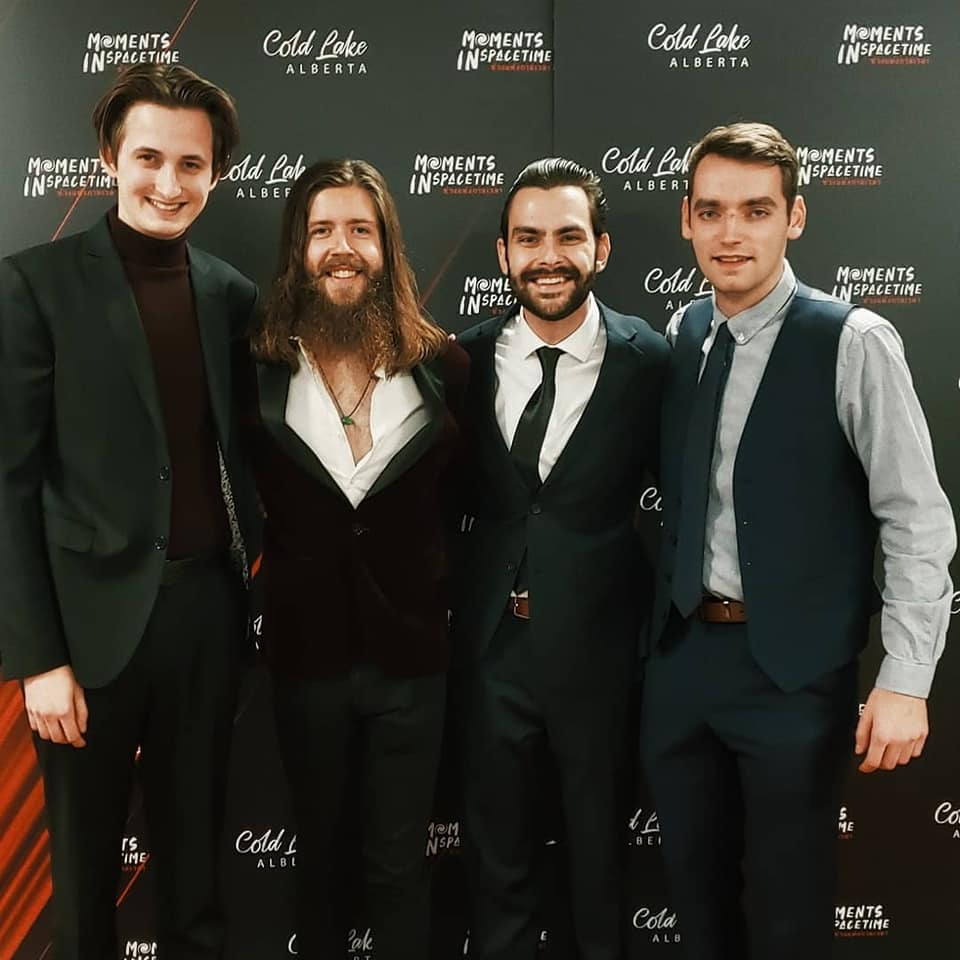
- FKB at the premiere for Moments in Spacetime in 2019

Background information
- Origin: Bonnyville, Alberta, Canada
- Genres: Pop rock; pop; alternative rock
- Years active: 2009–present
- Members: Drew Shalka; Derek Chalut; Travis Topylki; Alex Fedorouk
- Website: fkbmusic.ca

FKB is a Canadian rock band consisting of Drew Shalka, Derek Chalut, Travis Topylki, and Alex Fedorouk. They have released five musical works, 123 FKB (2014), "Bright Lights," "My Bedroom," "Casual Love," and "Backseat Daydream." Since they began touring they have performed hundreds of shows across Canada and the United States supporting acts including The Trews, Mother Mother, Bif Naked, Pop Evil, Dear Rouge, Dan Davidson, The Road Hammers, and Scott Helman.

== History ==
=== 2009–2015: Origins and 123 FKB ===
FKB originated in 2009 in Bonnyville, Alberta, where they began performing regularly while they were in high school. They attracted attention early on with their shows that featured a wide variety of musical styles including reggae, country, and rock, with their music often being influenced by The Beatles and Elvis Presley.

In 2012, they met another singer-songwriter from Bonnyville at one of their shows named Clayton Bellamy, a member of Canadian country rock band The Road Hammers. He became interested in their music and produced their first EP, 123 FKB which they released in 2014. Following the release they were voted into the top 100 campus bands on CBC Music by fans. 123 FKB also achieved chart success on campus radio reaching No. 19 on CJSR-FM in Edmonton, Alberta and No. 23 on CFBX-FM in Kamloops, British Columbia.

FKB performed at Extreme Mudfest in Bonnyville in 2015 where they opened for Canadian rock band The Trews. The festival also featured performances by The Road Hammers and Aaron Pritchett.

=== 2016–2019: "Bright Lights" ===
In 2016, FKB completed their first tour of Canada which consisted of 11 shows ranging from Vancouver to Toronto.

FKB released a single titled "Bright Lights" on April 25, 2017. That summer they launched a tour of North America with dates spanning from Vancouver, Canada to New York City. The tour also included a performance near their original hometown in Cold Lake, Alberta alongside Canadian artist Bif Naked for Canada's 150th Anniversary.

On January 16, 2018, FKB released a music video and single titled "My Bedroom" during a series of winter tour dates across Western Canada. Later that year, "Bright Lights" was nominated for Adult Alternative Recording of the Year at the Edmonton Music Awards. In July 2018, FKB released "Casual Love" on KnightVision Records. The music video for "Casual Love" was featured that fall at the Edmonton Short Film Festival. The band's 2018 tour dates extended throughout most of the year and included performances with The Road Hammers, Pop Evil, and Royal Tusk that November.

FKB released the single "Backseat Daydream" in February 2019. That March, they won the Jim Beam Talent Search in Edmonton, Alberta securing a spot to perform at Canadian Music Week in Toronto that May. They performed at the Amsterdam Brewhouse at Canadian Music Week on May 9, 2019. In late 2019, the band appeared as themselves in the feature film Moments in Spacetime and performed their song "My Bedroom".

== Discography ==
- 123 FKB (2014)
- "Bright Lights" (2017)
- "My Bedroom" (2018)
- "Casual Love" (2018)
- "Backseat Daydream" (2019)
- "Glow" (2020)
- "Beautiful Fantasy" (2021)
