= Sins, Lies and Angels =

Studio album by Jason McCoy
- Released: November 25, 2003
- Genre: Country
- Length: 42:07
- Label: Open Road Recordings
- Producers: Jason McCoy, Colin Linden

Jason McCoy chronology
| Honky Tonk Sonatas (2000) | Sins, Lies and Angels (2003) | Greatest Hits 1995-2005 (2005) |

Sins, Lies and Angels is the fifth album by Canadian country music singer Jason McCoy. "Old Chunk of Coal" is a cover of the John Anderson song "I'm Just an Old Chunk of Coal (But I'm Gonna Be a Diamond Someday)".

Sins, Lies and Angels was nominated for Album of the Year at the 2004 Canadian Country Music Awards. It also won Album of the Year at the 2004 Ontario Country Music Awards.

== Track listing ==
1. "Please, Please" (Jason McCoy, Steve Fox) – 3:06
2. "Still" (McCoy, George Ducas) – 4:07
3. "Guardian Angel" (McCoy) – 3:24
4. "I Lie" (McCoy) – 4:15
5. "It Ain't Easy Being Me" (Chris Knight) – 3:17
6. "I Feel a Sin Comin' On" (McCoy, Denny Carr) – 2:35
7. "Wild Flower" (McCoy, Odie Blackmon) – 4:21
8. "She Ain't Missin' Missin' Me" (McCoy, Blackmon) – 2:46
9. "She'd Rather Be Lonely Than Sorry" (McCoy, Adam Mitchell) – 4:04
10. "You Still Do It for Me" (McCoy, John Wiggins) – 3:01
11. "Thrown Out of Love" (Colin Linden, Jim Lauderdale) – 3:45
12. "Old Chunk of Coal" (Billy Joe Shaver) – 3:26
