= Asti, California =

Unincorporated community in California, United States

Asti, California Truetts Station
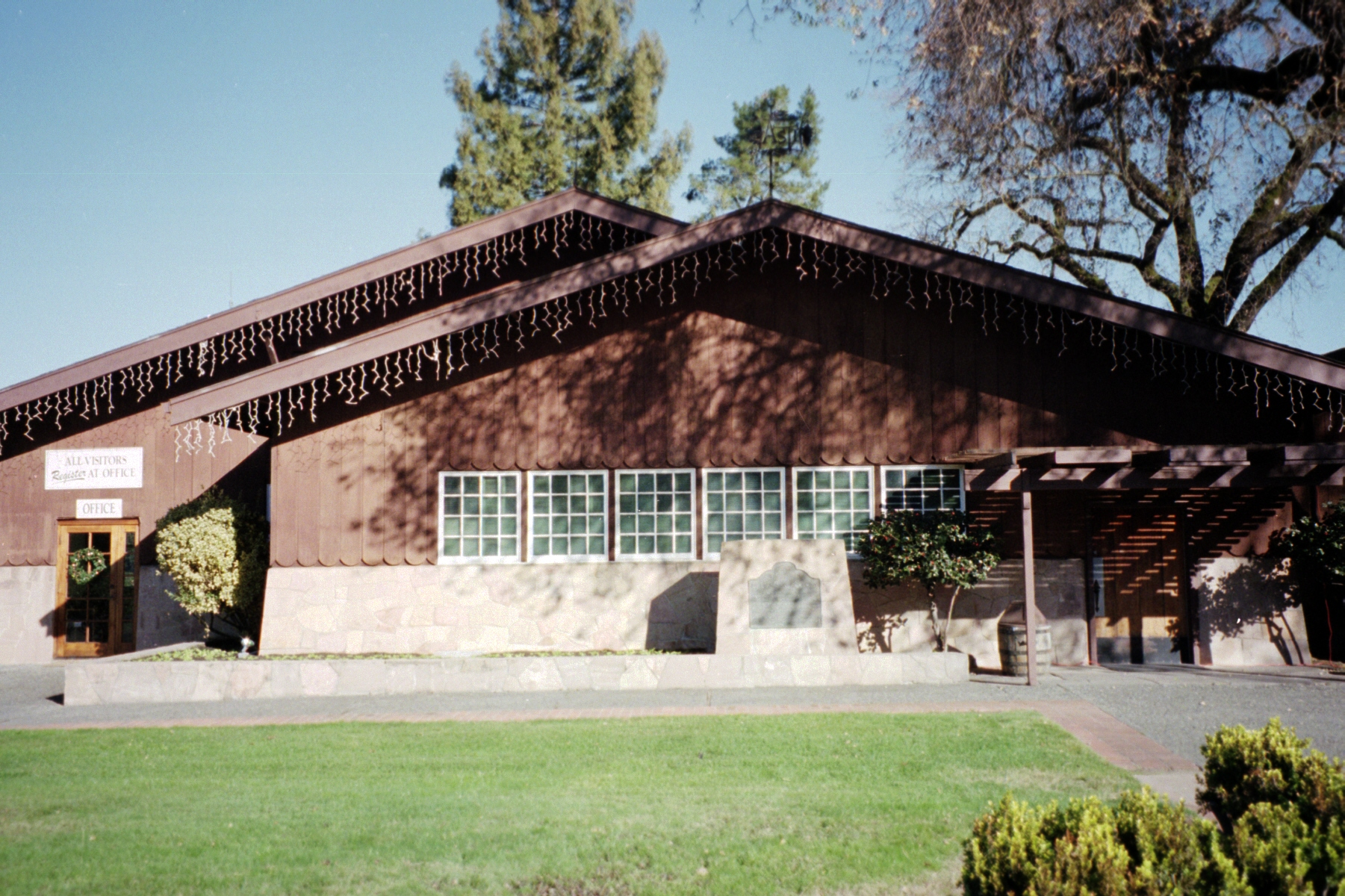
- The Asti Winery office building in Asti, California

- Location within the state of California
- Coordinates: 38°45′47″N 122°58′23″W
- Country: United States
- State: California
- County: Sonoma
- Named for: Province of Asti
- Elevation: 282 ft (86 m)
- Time zone: UTC−8 (Pacific)
  - Summer (DST): UTC−7 (PDT)
- ZIP code: 95413 (retired after 1978); 95425
- Area code: 707
- FIPS code: 06-03036
- GNIS feature ID: 1657958

California Historical Landmark
- Official name: Italian Swiss Colony
- Reference no.: 621

Asti is an unincorporated community in Sonoma County, California, United States. It is located near U.S. Route 101 in the Alexander Valley between Cloverdale, Geyserville and Healdsburg, and was named after the city in northern Italy (toponym in Italian instead of Piedmontese).

In 1881, Andrea Sbarboro established two communities, Asti and Chianti, as part of his Italian Swiss Agricultural Colony. A plaque at the southeast corner of Asti Road and Asti Post Office Road commemorates the colony, whose wines won ten gold medals in international competition. The colony is California Historical Landmark #621.

Located in the Alexander Valley AVA, Asti is the home of Asti Winery. By the mid-1950s, it had become the second-most-visited destination in California, after Disneyland.

Asti had a post office which closed in 1978 and used the ZIP Code 95413. The community is now served by Cloverdale's ZIP Code, 95425.

== Climate ==
This region experiences warm (but not hot) and dry summers, with no average monthly temperatures above 71.6 °F (22 °C). According to the Köppen Climate Classification system, Asti has a warm-summer Mediterranean climate, abbreviated "Csb" on climate maps.

== Gallery ==
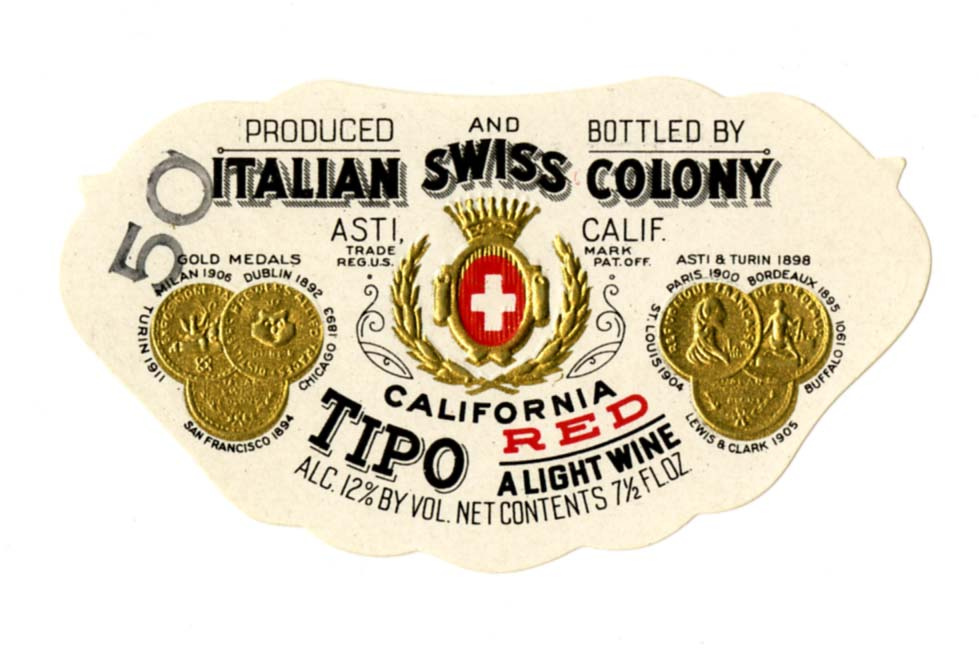
Wine label, Italian Swiss Colony, Tipo California Red

== See also ==
- Northwestern Pacific Railroad
