= Everything (Jason McCoy album) =

Studio album by Jason McCoy
- Released: March 1, 2011
- Genre: Country
- Length: 34:06
- Label: Open Road
- Producer: Jason McCoy; David Kalmusky; Scott Baggett; Deric Ruttan

Jason McCoy chronology
Christmas at the Grand (2010)	Everything (2011)

Singles from Everything
- 1. "She's Good for Me" Released: February 14, 2011; 2. "I'd Still Have Everything" Released: September 12, 2011

Professional ratings
Review scores
Source	Rating
Roughstock	4/5 stars

Everything is the sixth studio album by Canadian country music artist Jason McCoy. It was released by Open Road Recordings on March 1, 2011.

Everything was nominated for Country Album of the Year at the 2012 Juno Awards.

== Track listing ==
No.	Title	Writer(s)	Length
1.	"I Don't Think My Baby's Comin' Back"	Jason McCoy	2:25
2.	"I'd Rather Be Happy Than Right"	McCoy, Thom Shepherd	3:36
3.	"I'm Only in It for the Country Girls"	Scott Baggett, McCoy	3:09
4.	"I'd Still Have Everything"	McCoy, Shepherd	3:36
5.	"Heartache"	McCoy, Mike Plume	2:57
6.	"Louisiana Law"	Denny Carr, McCoy, Cyril Rawson	5:36
7.	"Little Bit of Lovin'"	Baggett, Chris Byrne, McCoy	2:42
8.	"She's Good for Me"	McCoy, Deric Ruttan	3:30
9.	"And I Love You"	Casey Beathard, Odie Blackmon	3:12
10.	"Don't Grow Today"	Steve Fox, McCoy	3:23
Total length:			34:06
