= Christmas at the Grand =

Studio album by Jason McCoy
- Released: November 2, 2010
- Genre: Country
- Length: 52:48
- Label: EMI

Jason McCoy chronology
Greatest Hits 1995–2005 (2005)	Christmas at the Grand (2010)	Everything (2011)

Christmas at the Grand is the first Christmas album by Canadian country music artist Jason McCoy. It was released by EMI on November 2, 2010. The album was recorded live at The Grand in Calgary and concert footage was turned into a TV special that aired on CMT.

== Track listing ==
1. "Dear Santa" (live) – 3:25
2. "This Is Christmas Day" (live) – 3:58
  - with Belle Star
3. "The Perfect Gift" (live) – 3:45
4. "I Wanna Be Your Santa Claus" (live) – 3:34
5. "Get Me Through December" (live) – 5:20
  - with Belle Starr
6. "Boogie Woogie Santa Claus" (live) – 3:15
  - with Colin James
7. "Santa Claus Is Coming to Town" (live) – 3:52
8. "Christmas (Baby Please Come Home)" (live) – 4:00
  - with Colin James, Belle Starr, Pavlo, Rik Emmett and Oscar Lopez
9. "Joy to the World" (live) – 4:44
10. "Niko's Tiny Carousel" (live) – 3:05
  - with Pavlo, Rik Emmett and Oscar Lopez
11. "Dear Santa" – 3:18
12. "The Perfect Gift" – 3:21
13. "Meet Me Under the Mistletoe" – 3:01
14. "This Is Christmas Day" – 4:10
