= Playin' for Keeps =

Studio album by Jason McCoy
- Released: July 8, 1997
- Genre: Country
- Length: 39:17
- Label: Universal
- Producer: Scott Baggett

Jason McCoy chronology
Jason McCoy (1995)	Playin' for Keeps (1997)	Honky Tonk Sonatas (2000)

Playin' for Keeps is the second album by Canadian country music singer Jason McCoy.

== Track listing ==
1. "Born Again in Dixieland (Jason McCoy, Naoise Sheridan, Denny Carr) – 3:25
2. "A Little Bit of You" (Craig Wiseman, McCoy, Sonny Burgess) – 2:56
3. "There's More Where That Came From" (McCoy, Naoise Sheridan, Denny Carr) – 4:16
4. "Dare You to Do That Again" (Scott Baggett, McCoy, S. Rice) – 2:59
5. "Heaven Help Her Heart" (McCoy, Odie Blackmon) – 3:13
6. "Out of This Town Alive" (McCoy, Blackmon) – 3:15
7. "Perfect Disguise" (McCoy, C. Curtis) – 3:47
8. "Doin' It Right" (Tom Lavin) – 2:52
9. "This Could Take All Night" (McCoy, Carr) – 3:18
10. "Get a Real Job" (McCoy, Al Anderson) – 2:42
11. "Forever and a Day" (McCoy, Carr) – 3:17
12. "I'm Gonna Make Her Mine" (McCoy, Chris Lindsey) – 3:17

== Chart performance ==
Chart (1997)	Peak position
Canadian RPM Country Albums	17
