= Girl on the Billboard =

Single by Del Reeves

from the album Girl on the Billboard
- B-side: "Eyes Don't Come Crying to Me"
- Released: February 1965
- Genre: Country
- Length: 2:41
- Label: United Artists
- Songwriters: Hank Mills, Walter Haynes
- Producer: Kelso Herston

Del Reeves singles chronology
"Talking to the Night Lights" (1964)	"Girl on the Billboard" (1965)	"The Belles of the Southern Bell" (1965)

"Girl on the Billboard" is a 1965 single released by American country music singer Del Reeves. The novelty song was Reeves' fourth entry on the U.S. country chart and his only number-one single. "Girl on the Billboard" spent two weeks at number one and a total of 20 weeks on the chart, in addition to reaching number 96 on the Billboard Hot 100. It has become one of many country standards about lust.

== Synopsis ==
The song is about a trucker who falls in love with a picture of a beautiful young woman, whose towel-clad likeness is plastered as part of a roadside billboard advertisement along Route 66. The trucker drives a daily freight route from Chicago to St. Louis along the highway where the billboard is located. He also notes how many trucker accidents have occurred near the billboard.

Early one morning, while his truck idles nearby, the trucker knocks on the door of the artist who painted the billboard and (presumably) asks for the model's contact information. The painter curtly tells the trucker that the "girl wasn't real" and that he'd "better get the [censored] on his way." (An electric guitar riff is used in place of the profanity.) Disillusioned at his fantasy being ruined, the trucker moans that along the highway, "you'll find tiny pieces of my heart scattered every which-a-way."

== Cover versions ==
- In 2005, Canadian band the Road Hammers released a cover version on its debut album. It was later released in the U.S., peaking at number 54 in 2008.
- In 2023, Brian Setzer released a cover which appears on his album The Devil Always Collects.

== Chart performance ==
=== Del Reeves ===
Chart (1965)	Peak position
U.S. Billboard Hot Country Singles	1
U.S. Billboard Hot 100	96
Canadian RPM Top Singles	31

=== The Road Hammers ===
Chart (2008)	Peak position
US Hot Country Songs (Billboard)	54
