= Jason McCoy (album) =

Studio album by Jason McCoy
- Released: June 7, 1995
- Genre: Country
- Length: 40:21
- Label: MCA
- Producer: Scott Baggett

Jason McCoy chronology
Greatest Times of All (1989)	Jason McCoy (1995)	Playin' for Keeps (1997)

Jason McCoy is the second album by Canadian country music singer Jason McCoy.

== Track listing ==
1. "Country Side" (Jason McCoy) – 3:54
2. "This Used to Be Our Town" (Denny Carr, McCoy, Chris Lindsey) – 3:46
3. "Learning a Lot About Love" (Terrine Barnes, McCoy) – 3:35
4. "Candle" (McCoy, Barnes) – 3:07
5. "I Know How to Love You" (McCoy, Lindsey) – 3:00
6. "Take It from Me" (McCoy) – 3:33
7. "Fastest Man Alive" (McCoy) – 4:46
8. "All the Way" (McCoy, Lindsey) – 4:18
9. "Ghosts" (McCoy) – 4:18
10. "Your Mama Warned You 'Bout Me" (McCoy) – 3:16
11. "Cornelia" (McCoy, Carr) – 2:48

== Chart performance ==
Chart (1995)	Peak position
Canadian RPM Country Albums	2
