= All the Way (Jason McCoy song) =

Single by Jason McCoy

from the album Jason McCoy
- Released: 1996
- Genre: Country
- Length: 4:18
- Label: MCA
- Songwriters: Jason McCoy; Chris Lindsey
- Producer: Scott Baggett

Jason McCoy singles chronology
"Candle" (1995)	"All the Way" (1996)	"Born Again in Dixieland" (1997)

"All the Way" is a song recorded by Canadian country music artist Jason McCoy. It was released in 1996 as the seventh single from his second studio album, Jason McCoy (1995). It peaked at number 4 on the RPM Country Tracks chart in July 1996.

== Chart performance ==
Chart (1996)	Peak position
Canada Country Singles (RPM)	4

=== Year-end charts ===
Chart (1996)	Position
Canada Country Tracks (RPM)	6
