= Mantracker =

- Genre: Reality; Wilderness survival Outdoors; Game show
- Created by: Ihor Macijiwsky
- Directed by: Ihor Macijiwsky
- Starring: Terry Grant; Chad Savage Lenz
- Narrated by: Shawn Colin; Shawn Devlin
- Country of origin: Canada
- Original language: English
- No. of seasons: 7
- No. of episodes: 72 (list of episodes)

Production
- Production locations: Canada; United States
- Camera setup: Multiple
- Running time: Season 1: 24 minutes Seasons 2–7: 46 minutes
- Production company: Bonterra Productions

Original release
- Network: OLN
- Release: 12 April 2006 – 22 August 2012

Mantracker is a Canadian reality television series created by Ihor Macijiwsky and produced by Bonterra Productions. It premiered in Canada in April 2006 on the Outdoor Life Network. In the United States, the show aired on the Science Channel. In South Africa, it airs on the History Channel and in the UK on Extreme Sports Channel and Blaze. The episodes of the first six seasons feature Terry Grant, an expert tracker called the "Mantracker", who pursues two individuals in the remote Canadian or American wilderness. The pursued, referred to as "Prey", must elude capture while attempting to reach a finish line within thirty-six hours. In season 7, Chad Savage Lenz replaces Terry Grant as the Mantracker.

== Format ==
The object of Mantracker is for the Prey to reach a finish line some 17 to 60 kilometres (10-37 miles) away without getting caught by the Mantracker in a pre-determined time (usually 36 hours). The Mantracker's goal is to catch the Prey before they reach the finish line, within the designated time. There is no prize for succeeding, other than "bragging rights" and personal satisfaction.

Each episode features a two-person team of Prey who usually (but not always) have a pre-existing relationship. The Prey have varying wilderness survival skills and physical fitness levels. The only items provided to the Prey are a map (that includes the location of the finish line) and a compass for navigation. The Prey carries the gear they consider necessary to complete the challenge. The Prey determine for themselves how to avoid capture.

The Mantracker does not meet the team before the chase or know their destination. Traveling on horseback and aided by a local guide (known as the "Sidekick"), the Mantracker relies on his tracking skills, though some equipment (such as regular and infrared binoculars) is sometimes used.

The Prey is given a head start, usually about 2 kilometres (1 mile), although in more rugged terrain that distance may be greater. The chase is started by a flare gun fired from the Prey's position. The Prey head towards the finish, using the terrain to hide their location. The Mantracker and his Sidekick ride to where they believe the Prey began and attempt to determine the direction in which they are headed.

The Prey travel through the terrain, often going off-trail and "bushwhacking" through dense brush, over hills, rocky ground, and rivers and lakes to reach the finish line and to escape the Mantracker. The race often includes overnight camping. There is no pre-set stopping point on day one or starting time on day two. Although the Prey commonly travel on foot, they can use other transportation modes. For example, in one episode the Prey hitchhiked for a short distance. In another episode, the Prey used rock climbing gear to scale down a steep cliff.

Unless time runs out, the race ends when the Prey successfully arrive at the finish line or if the Mantracker or the Sidekick captures them. To capture the Prey, the Mantracker or the Sidekick must tag or somehow block their movement. If the rider and horse get close enough, the Prey often concedes. If one of the Prey is caught, the remaining one can continue alone.

== Cast ==
Terry Grant is a 25-year veteran of the Alberta Foothills Search and Rescue Team, Chief Scout of Scouts Canada, an expert in utilizing clues such as footprints, probable path and other signs of human presence to track prey. Grant announced that Season 6 would be his last due to a salary dispute with Bonterra Productions. In February 2011, auditions for the new Mantracker to replace Grant took place. In the Season 7 premiere, broadcast on 21 May 2012, it was announced that the new Mantracker would be Chad Savage Lenz. Without the popular Terry Grant as the Mantracker, the series concluded after a single season with Lenz in the starring role although no formal announcement about the series cancellation has ever been made by Bonterra Productions.

=== Sidekicks ===
- Phil Lemieux
- Curtis Hallock
- Leon Chow
- Barry Keown
- Martin Dillabough
- Mark Murphy
- Jeff Damberger
- Neil Carey
- TJ Maynard
- Nate Bogusz

== Production ==
The series is recorded primarily in Canada, but as of Season 4, two episodes were shot in California. By the end of Season 4, the Provinces and territories of Canada like Manitoba, New Brunswick, Prince Edward Island, Northwest Territories and Nunavut have yet to be featured. For the first time, in Season 4, an episode was taped in Newfoundland and aired between April and June 2009.

The show's typical production schedule has Grant arriving at the location on a Sunday; on Monday morning, the producer and cinematographer travel to the site with the Prey for pre chase interviews, to learn the Prey's strategy and to shoot background shots. The Prey never meet Mantracker until they are caught or make it to the finish line, whichever happens first. Mantracker and the Sidekick are on horseback and often finish the pursuit by galloping to the prey location.

The hunt starts on Tuesday and lasts for 36 consecutive hours. Each episode is edited immediately, awaiting the season run on OLN.

In past interviews, Grant has indicated that the camera crew has him stop to prove where he sees tracks and also has at times sent out false Prey and production staff to prevent him from just looking for the actual camera crew. Additionally, the Prey's camera crew often change footwear, and are expert woodsmen who often mask their presence in various ways.

== Episodes ==
Season 3 aired on OLN on Sundays at 9:00 pm, and Saturdays 10:00 pm EST. Season 4 finished filming in fall 2008 and aired Sunday, 26 July 2009 starting with "Billy and The Rev" on OLN with an encore on 1 August 2009. In spring 2009, Citytv, another Rogers-owned station began airing repeats in local affiliates across Canada. Season 5 premiered on 3 September 2010. Season 6 premiered 17 April 2011. A pair of Yellowknife women were shortlisted as prey for the season. For Season 6, Bonterra announced that one of its teams of Prey would include NHL player Shane Doan and his brother, Brook. Season 7, the final season, premiered 21 May 2012; the final episode, "Shaun & Vanessa", aired 27 August 2012.

== Winners ==
Out of 38 teams, 16 teams have had only one member making it to the finish, and 13 teams have had both members making it to the finish. So far, the individual odds of beating Mantracker are 30%, and the team odds of beating Mantracker are 20%.

In Season 1, 27.77% of contestants won.

- 1.02 – Nicolina & Liisa ( used car to win )
- 1.06 – Vlad & Nate
- 1.08 – Mike

In Season 2, 31.25% of contestants won.

- 2.03 – Dustin & Ian
- 2.04 – Brent
- 2.08 – Steve & Jeff

In Season 3, 25% of contestants won.

- 3.05 – Taylor
- 3.06 – Bruce
- 3.07 – Buck & RJ
- 3.10 – Kaleigh

In Season 4, 37.5% of contestants won.

- 4.02 – Lauren
- 4.03 – Rene & Dave
- 4.05 – Hainsley
- 4.07 – Tommy & Steve

In Season 5, 29% of contestants won.

- 5.01 - Clayton & Jason
- 5.02 - Layney
- 5.04 - Brendyn
- 5.08 - Dylan & Travis
- 5.11 - Ben & Darrell
- 5.12 - Tim

In Season 6, 33% of contestants won

- 6.01 - Shane & Brook
- 6.04 - Melanie
- 6.06 - Rusty
- 6.09 - Warren & Margriet
- 6.10 - Mike
- 6.12 - Jesse

In Season 7, 17% of contestants won

- 7.01 - Huck
- 7.04 - Les & Tyler
- 7.07 - Stacey

== Hiatus and end ==
Following the end of Season 7 which featured new Mantracker Chad "Savage" Lenz, the show began an apparent hiatus. Official websites for OLN and Bonterra Productions for Mantracker have not been updated since Season 7 and show no mention of the show being cancelled or going on a break. It was confirmed in 2017 by Terry Grant himself, that Mantracker wouldn't return for an eighth season, marking the end for the Mantracker series.

== See also ==
- Wanted, a British TV show from the 1990s with a similar concept, but a more urban setting
- Hunted, an ongoing (as of 2024) British TV show with a similar concept. It has been adapted into an American version and an Australian version
