= Italian Swiss Colony =

Wine company

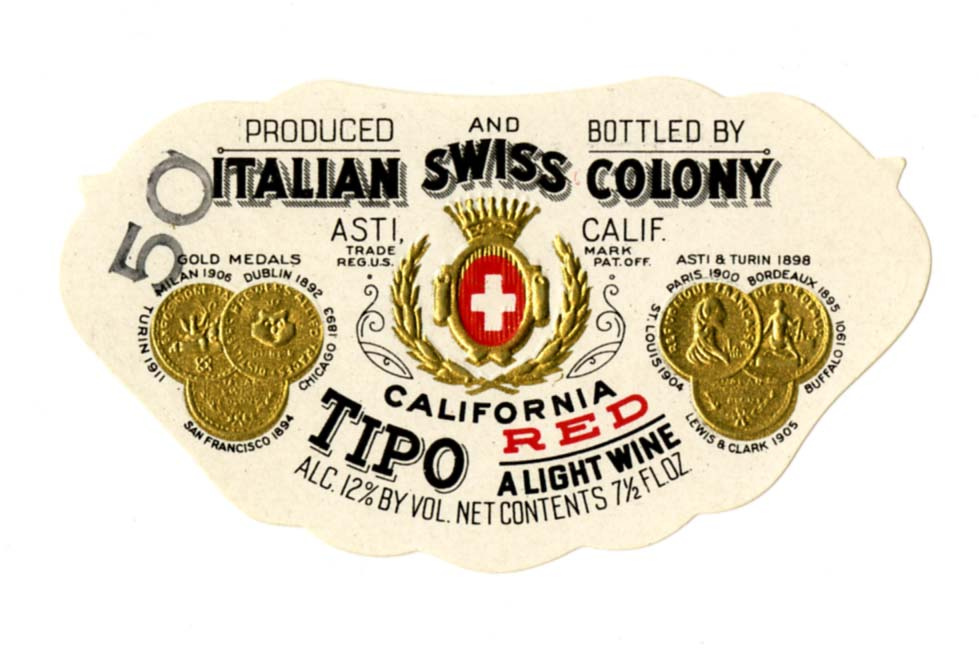
- Label for a "Tipo", once the brand's signature variety, sold in fiasco bottles in imitation of Chianti

- Location within California Location within the United States
- 38°17′36″N 122°27′20″W
- Location: Sonoma, Sonoma County, California

California Historical Landmark
- Official name: Italian Swiss Colony
- Designated: 1881
- Reference no.: 621

Italian Swiss Colony was a 19th and 20th-century American wine company and brand. Based in Asti, Sonoma County, California, Italian Swiss Colony was at one time the leading wine producer in California.

== Establishment and growth ==
In 1881, Andrea Sbarboro founded an agricultural colony at Asti (named for Asti in Italy), primarily focused on grapes. Sbarboro's intent was to establish a profitable enterprise that would provide work for the many Italians who had migrated to San Francisco (although there were at first some Italian speaking Swiss from Ticino, thus giving the colony its name, it soon became an entirely Italian-American enterprise.) The corporation had originally been organized to allow the workers to eventually buy ownership, but this never developed, and it remained a normal joint-stock company. In 1887, a collapse in grape prices forced the company to construct a winery and begin wine production itself.

Key personnel in these early years, besides Sbarboro, were Charles Kohler, Paolo de Vecchi, and Pietro Rossi. Rossi led the company to develop its own agencies to sell directly to eastern markets; soon after the wine was being sold in Europe, South America, and Asia. The huge wine cistern (with a capacity of 500,000 U.S. gallons or 1.9 megaliters) that Sbarboro had had built became a tourist attraction. By 1905, the wines had won medals at various international competitions. By 1910 the company owned over 5,000 acres (2,000 hectares) in various holdings in the Central Valley.

As the movement for prohibition of alcohol in the United States grew, Sbarboro became a leading spokesman for wine and temperance, but lived to see the beginning of prohibition on January 16, 1920.

== After prohibition ==
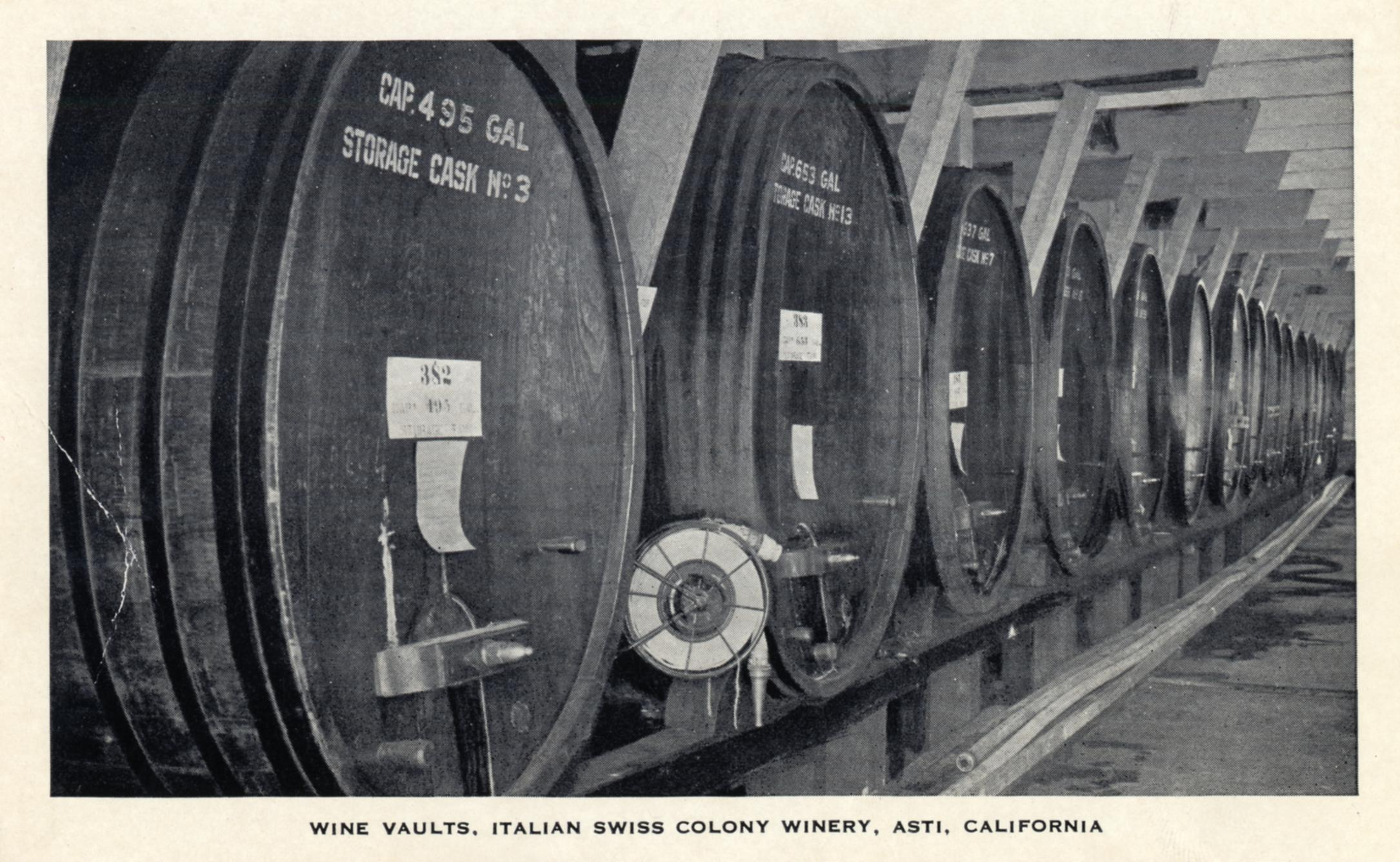
Wine vaults, around 1940

The Italian Swiss Colony operation (then owned by National Distillers) was acquired in 1953 by Louis Petri of Petri Wine (founded in 1886). Petri shepherded the growth of Italian Swiss Colony as a mass-market brand; wine was shipped in tankers to be bottled in New York. Television ads featuring Ludwig Stössel (voiced by Jim Backus; yodeling by Bob Oates) with the catchphrase "The little old winemaker – me!" appeared regularly on American national television. (Dean Martin and others recorded a song titled on a parody of that line, "Little Old Wine Drinker Me".)

The company later became part of United Vintners (organized by Louis Petri and others), then was sold to Heublein in 1969, and later sold by Heublein to Allied Growers. By 1987, the company had been renamed to ISC Wines and the brand from Italian Swiss Colony to just Colony (ISC also had other brands, including jug wine label Petri). In 1987 Allied Growers sold ISC Wines to Erly Industries, who merged it with Sierra Wine Company into a new entity. In 2015 the descendant of the company, now operating under the name Asti Winery and selling wine under the Souverain brand, and owning America's sixth-largest wine production facility, was purchased by E & J Gallo Winery from its owner, Australia-based Treasury Wine Estates.

== See also ==
- Petri Wine
