= Petri Wine =

Family run winery in California

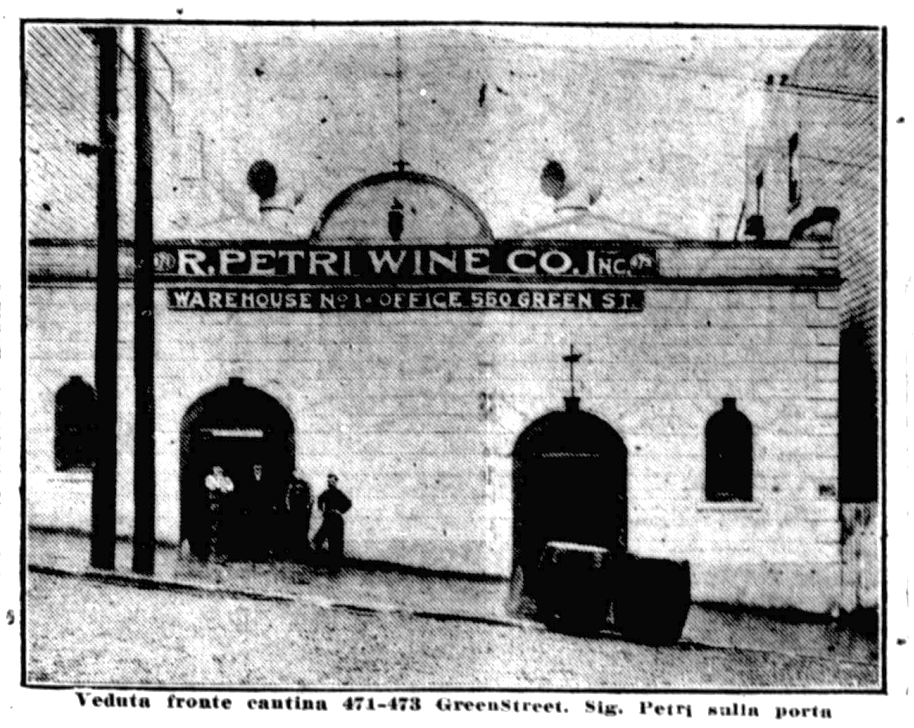
R. Petri Wine Company Warehouse, San Francisco, 1913

Petri Wine is a family-run vineyard in San Francisco, California, United States. It was founded in 1886 by Raffaello Petri. In 1953, Petri Wine was the largest domestic producer of wine in the United States.

Petri originally produced their wine exclusively in kegs for bulk, local distribution. During prohibition, the Petri family closed down their wineries, sold their 250,000 gallons worth of stock, and used those profits to become involved in other industries, especially making Italian leather goods and cigars. After the repeal of prohibition, the Petri family used their profits from these enterprises to purchase a number of competing wineries. In 1935 Louis Petri decided to begin bottling their wines and distributing the wine nationally, while also maintaining their bulk business by contracting with E & J Gallo Winery.

The Petri Wine company was also instrumental in founding the Allied Grape Growers, an organization devoted to stabilizing grape prices. In 1952, Petri also founded the United Vintners.

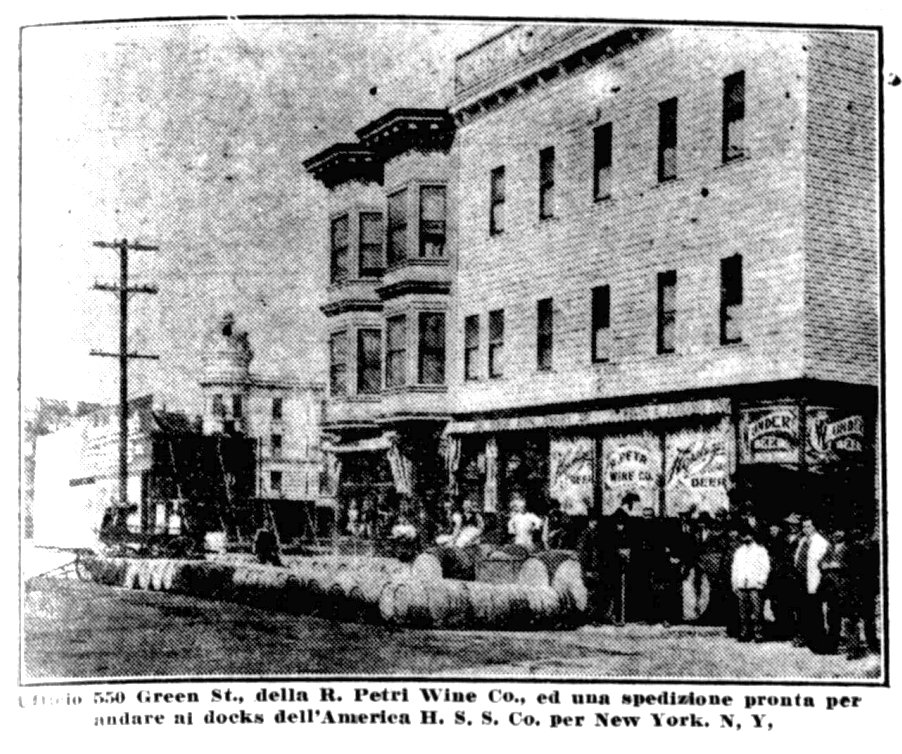
R. Petri Storefront, San Francisco, 1913

In 1953, Petri wine bought the winemaker Italian Swiss Colony, which was about the same size as Petri at the time. As of 1955, Petri Wine was based in Escalon, California, and the Petri Wine name was used for wines produced by the Allied Grape Growers. Louis Petri continued to head both the Petri Wine operation and the Allied Grape Growers.

Petri Wine sponsored the popular radio show, The New Adventures of Sherlock Holmes from 1943 until 1946, when Basil Rathbone left the show and was replaced by Tom Conway, when the clothing company Clipper Craft became the new sponsor, and much later Kreml Hair Tonic for Men. Most of the surviving Petri Wine sponsored editions, amongst other versions, may still be found online and on CD. Petri Wine also sponsored the popular radio show, The Casebook of Gregory Hood (1946–1951). Harry Bartell was the company's spokesman on the show for most episodes.

In 1956 Petri celebrated their 70th anniversary and commissioned a 16mm filmed silent 30-minute documentary called "The History of Petri Wines" to run at their facility and at wine fairs. It was filmed silent to 1) save money, and 2) allow it to be shown in crowded noisy gatherings. C.R. Skinner Productions of San Francisco produced this. (A film print survives in the Niles Essanay Silent Film Museum film archive.)

In 1968, soon after purchasing United Vintners from Louis Petri, Allied Grape Growers agreed to sell United Vintners, including the Petri label, to Heublein.
