= Little Old Wine Drinker Me =

1967 song performed by Robert Mitchum

- German release picture sleeve

Single by Robert Mitchum

from the album That Man Robert Mitchum...Sings
- B-side: "Walker's Woods"
- Released: March 1967
- Recorded: January 19, 1967
- Studio: Fred Foster Sound Studio, Nashville, Tennessee
- Genre: Country
- Length: 2:25
- Label: Monument
- Songwriters: Hank Mills and Dick Jennings
- Producer: Fred Foster

"Little Ole Wine Drinker, Me"

Single by Dean Martin

from the album Welcome to My World
- B-side: "I Can't Help Remembering You"
- Released: August 1967
- Recorded: June 23, 1967
- Studio: United, Hollywood, California
- Genre: Country pop
- Length: 2:47
- Label: Reprise
- Songwriters: Hank Mills & Dick Jennings
- Producer: Jimmy Bowen

"Little Old Wine Drinker Me" (sometimes rendered with a comma between the final two words) is a country pop song written in the 1960s by Hank Mills and Dick Jennings. The title parodied what was then a well-known catchphrase in TV commercials for the Italian Swiss Colony wine company: "The little old winemaker, me!". The song is about a man trying to drink away his romantic troubles.

The song was first released by Charlie Walker in 1966 on the album Wine, Woman & Walker. It became a hit when it was released by Robert Mitchum in early 1967, and by Dean Martin later that same year on his Welcome to My World album. Lefty Frizzell also recorded the song on his 1967 album Puttin 'On.

Mitchum's version spent two weeks on the Billboard Hot 100 chart, peaking at number 96 while reaching number 9 on Billboard's Hot Country Singles chart.

Martin's version spent six weeks on the Billboard Hot 100 chart, peaking at number 38, while reaching number five on Billboard's Easy Listening chart, and number four on Australia's Go-Set chart.

In Canada, Martin's version and Mitchum's version reachednumber 32 on the RPM 100, in a tandem ranking.

The Martin recording later became popular with the Scottish football club Clydebank. It can often be heard being chanted on the terraces, with "Tennessee" replaced with "Kilbowie" in homage to the club's former ground in the town.
