= The Casebook of Gregory Hood =

Radio detective program in the United States

- Genre: Detective program
- Running time: 30 minutes
- Country of origin: United States
- Language: English
- Starring: Gale Gordon; Elliott Lewis; Jackson Beck; Paul McGrath; Martin Gabel; George Petrie
- Created by: Anthony Boucher and Denis Green
- Written by: Anthony Boucher and Denis Green
- Directed by: Martin Andrews
- Original release: June 3, 1946 – 1950
- Sponsored by: Petri Wine

The Casebook of Gregory Hood was a radio detective program in the United States. It was co-created and co-written by Anthony Boucher, and existed in several versions - with different stars on different networks in different years.

Hood was an importer in San Francisco who dealt in rare items. John Dunning summarized the show's premise as follows: "With his sidekick Sanderson ('Sandy') Taylor, Hood traveled the world seeking artifacts for his import house. Each item found by Hood had an intriguing history and was inevitably linked to some present-day mystery." The character of Hood was based on real-life importer Richard Gump, who lived in San Francisco. Gump also was a consultant for the program.

== Background ==
Hood was a character with a multi-faceted personality. One website devoted to old-time radio wrote about him as follows:

Gregory Hood was also an accomplished pianist and composer, a self-taught forensics expert, spoke several languages fluently, was an expert in ancient and modern armament, had a military intelligence background, was a wine expert with an extensive rare wine cellar, and was an acknowledged expert in oriental tapestry. He lived in a penthouse on San Francisco's Nob Hill and employed a Chinese valet, Fong.

On June 3, 1946, The Casebook of Gregory Hood began on the Mutual Broadcasting System, replacing The New Adventures of Sherlock Holmes for the summer. Although intended to be just a summer replacement, it continued in the fall, sponsored by Petri Wine. Jeffrey Marks, in his biography of co-creator Anthony Boucher, explained, "The show had originally been planned as a summer replacement for The New Adventures of Sherlock Holmes in 1946, but continued for the next year when the radio network had difficulty in reaching an agreement with the Conan Doyle estate." The program had another full-season run on ABC in 1949-50 and also "resurfaced periodically in summer slots."

The show was written by Boucher and Denis Green, who also teamed to write the Holmes show. Marks provided this background:

Boucher and Green did such a good job for the Holmes show that they were asked about writing an original series for Mutual Radio. Radio shows relied on new episodes. Just as TV airs re-runs during the summer, radio shows gave their actors a summer hiatus of 13 weeks. Networks frequently ran original short-run programming during the summer. Boucher and Green came up with "The Casebook of Gregory Hood" a San Francisco-based antiquities expert who seemed to find current day crimes in the artifacts that he dealt with. The Casebook of Gregory Hood was nearly identical to The New Adventures of Sherlock Holmes in its opening: same sponsor, same announcement, same narrator frame for storytelling, and the same music. The narrator stopped by to visit Gregory either in his office or home, and the story was told by Hood. Hood's own Watson, Sandy Taylor, accompanied him. Taylor was Hood's lawyer and friend.

Book reviewer Bertil Falk noted that the technique Boucher and Green used had deep roots in storytelling. He wrote: "The structure was of a very ancient kind, a frame story where Gregory Hood and his friend tell Harry Bartell a story from the casebook of Gregory Hood. It is a literary method well known from The Arabian Nights and much older than that, since it was used in the Sanskrit work Panchatantra more than two thousand years ago. Gale Gordon played Gregory Hood in the initial version of the program. Others who had the leading role later were Elliott Lewis, Jackson Beck, Paul McGrath, Martin Gabel and George Petrie. Sidekick Sanderson Taylor was portrayed at various times by Art Gilmore, Carl Harbord, William Bakewell and Howard McNear.

Changes in stars, time slots and networks undoubtedly hindered the show's success. Marks wrote: "The show suffered from a constantly rotating cast. ... Boucher grew increasingly annoyed with the lack of support for the series." Boucher indicated his dissatisfaction in some personal correspondence: "As to myself and the contest -- the excellent idea you proposed of entering a Gregory Hood short story no longer appeals to me. My relations with the agency controlling the Hood program have become so unsatisfactory that I have no desire to build up their property for them, nor to associate myself too closely with it." In 2009, Crippen & Landru Publishers produced a volume of their Lost Classic Series devoted to The Casebook of Gregory Hood. The book contains 14 scripts from the series.
