= Honky Tonk Sonatas =

Studio album by Jason McCoy
- Released: August 29, 2000
- Genre: Country
- Length: 39:11
- Label: Universal
- Producers: Odie Blackmon, Mike Poole

Jason McCoy chronology
Playin' for Keeps (1997)	Honky Tonk Sonatas (2000)	Sins, Lies and Angels (2003)

Honky Tonk Sonatas is the fourth album by Canadian country music singer Jason McCoy.

== Track listing ==
1. "I've Got a Weakness" (Casey Beathard, Michael Heeney) – 4:26
2. "Kind of Like It's Love" (Jim Lauderdale, John Leventhal) – 3:00
3. "Whisper" (Lauderdale) – 3:19
4. "Ten Million Teardrops" (Jason McCoy, Tim Taylor) – 3:14
5. "I Would for You" (Jay Knowles, Wynn Varble, Shawn Camp) – 3:11
6. "My Love Will Follow You" (Buddy Miller, Julie Miller) – 3:08
7. "Bury My Heart" (Tia Sillers, Mark Selby, Sean Michaels) – 2:58
8. "Fix Anything" (McCoy, Denny Carr) – 4:08
9. "Broke Down" (McCoy, Odie Blackmon) – 3:41
10. "Doin' Time in Bakersfield" (Lauderdale, Frank Dycus) – 3:18
  - duet with Gary Allan
11. "Don't Look Away" (James McGehee, Sean Michaels) – 4:48

== Chart performance ==
Chart (2000)	Peak position
Canadian RPM Country Albums	9

=== Year-end charts ===
Chart (2001)	Position
Canadian Country Albums (Nielsen SoundScan)	98
