= Penny DeHaven =

American singer-songwriter (1948–2014)

- Also known as: Penny Starr
- Born: Charlotte DeHaven; May 17, 1948; Winchester, Virginia, U.S.
- Died: February 23, 2014 (aged 65)
- Genres: Country, gospel
- Occupation: Singer
- Years active: 1967–2014
- Labels: United Artists, Mainstreet, Elektra, Imperial
- Formerly of: Del Reeves

Charlotte "Penny" DeHaven (May 17, 1948 – February 23, 2014) was an American country and gospel music singer. At the beginning of her career, she recorded as Penny Starr.

DeHaven was born in Winchester, Virginia, United States. She is best known for her country hit singles in the late 1960s and early 1970s. Her biggest hit was "Land Mark Tavern", a duet with Del Reeves in 1970.

DeHaven's other singles included country remakes of such pop hits as Billy Joe Royal's "Down in the Boondocks" (1969), The Beatles' "I Feel Fine" (1970), The Everly Brothers' "Crying in the Rain" (with Reeves, 1972), and Marvin Gaye's "I'll Be Doggone" (1974).

Her albums included 1972's Penny DeHaven and 2011's gospel collection A Penny Saved.

As an actress, she made two guest appearances on the CBS-TV/syndicated TV show Hee Haw in 1972–73. She also appeared in the movies Traveling Light, Country Music Story, the 1973 horror movie Valley of Blood, and the 1974 TV series Funny Farm.

DeHaven died from cancer on February 23, 2014, at the age of 65.

== Discography ==
=== Albums ===
Year	Album	Label
1972	Penny DeHaven	United Artists
1984	Penny DeHaven	Mainstreet

=== Singles ===
Year	Single	Chart Positions		Album
Year	Single	US Country	CAN Country	Album
1967	"A Grain of Salt" (as Penny Starr)	69	—	singles only
1968	"Big City Men"	—	—	singles only
1968	"Kid Games and Nursery Rhymes"	—	—	singles only
1968	"I Am the Woman"	—	—	singles only
1969	"You're Never Gonna See My Face Again"	—	—	singles only
1969	"Mama Lou"	34	—	singles only
1969	"Down in the Boondocks"	37	8	singles only
1970	"I Feel Fine"	59	—	singles only
1970	"Land Mark Tavern" (with Del Reeves)	20	24	singles only
1970	"Awful Lotta Lovin'"	69	—	Penny DeHaven (1972)
1971	"The First Love"	46	—	Penny DeHaven (1972)
1971	"Don't Change on Me"	42	—	Penny DeHaven (1972)
1971	"Another Day of Loving"	61	—	Penny DeHaven (1972)
1972	"Crying in the Rain" (with Del Reeves)	54	—	single only
1972	"Gone"	—	—	Penny DeHaven (1972)
1973	"The Lovin' of Your Life"	96	—	singles only
1973	"I'll Be Doggone"	67	—	singles only
1974	"Play with Me"	93	—	singles only
1974	"I'll Never Stop"	—	—	singles only
1976	"(The Great American) Classic Cowboy"	83	—	singles only
1980	"Bayou Lullaby"	—	—	singles only
1982	"We Made Memories" (with Boxcar Willie)	77	—	Last Train to Heaven (Boxcar Willie album)
1983	"Only the Names Have Been Changed"	74	—	Penny DeHaven (1984)
1984	"Friendly Game of Hearts"	78	—	Penny DeHaven (1984)
1984	"Yes, I Do"	—	—	Penny DeHaven (1984)
