= The New Adventures of Sherlock Holmes =

Old-time radio show (1939 to 1950)

- Nigel Bruce and Basil Rathbone as Watson and Holmes
- Other names: "The Adventures of Sherlock Holmes", "Sherlock Holmes", "Sherlock Holmes and Doctor Watson"
- Genre: Detective radio drama
- Running time: 30 min
- Country of origin: United States
- Language: English
- Home station: Blue Network, ABC
- Syndicates: Mutual Broadcasting System,
- Starring: Basil Rathbone; Nigel Bruce; Tom Conway; John Stanley; Alfred Shirley; Ian Martin; George Spelvin; Ben Wright; Eric Snowden
- Announcer: Knox Manning 1939–1942, Owen Babbe, Marx Hartman, Bob Campbell, Harry Bartell, Joseph Bell, Cy Harrice, Herb Allen
- Written by: Edith Meiser, Leslie Charteris, Denis Green, Anthony Boucher
- Original release: October 2, 1939 – June 14, 1950
- No. of episodes: 374
- Sponsored by: Grove's Bromo Quinine, Petri Wine, Kreml Hair Tonic, Trimount Clothing Co.

The New Adventures of Sherlock Holmes is a radio drama series which aired in the USA from 1939 to 1950, it ran for 374 episodes. The series was based on the Sherlock Holmes stories by Arthur Conan Doyle. Some of the surviving episode recordings may be found online, in various audio quality condition; many of the later episodes have not survived.

For most of the show's run, the program starred Basil Rathbone as Sherlock Holmes and Nigel Bruce as Dr. Watson. They reprised their roles from the 1939–1946 film series. Other actors played Holmes and Watson in later seasons.

== Production ==
From the outset of the show, the series was billed in different listings under various titles including Sherlock Holmes, Sherlock Holmes and Doctor Watson, and other titles. The most popularly remembered title is The New Adventures of Sherlock Holmes. On occasion, the title of a radio episode differs from that of its original story – for example, the radio adaption of "The Adventure of the Red Circle" is entitled "Mrs. Warren's Lodger".

From 1939 until 1943, episodes were adapted or written by Edith Meiser who had written the earlier series The Adventures of Sherlock Holmes which aired from 1930 to 1935. Meiser left the show after disagreements with a sponsor over the amount of violence in the program. It is also reported that Meiser left the show to focus on other projects. From 1943 onward, most episodes were written by the team of Denis Green and Anthony Boucher with some early episodes written by Green and Leslie Charteris. Edith Meiser returned to write for the show for its seventh season. Max Ehrlich and Howard Merrill wrote the episodes of season 8. Denis Green returned as a writer for the last season.

Originally, the show starred Basil Rathbone as Sherlock Holmes and Nigel Bruce as Doctor Watson. Together, they starred in 220 episodes which aired weekly on Mondays from 8:30 to 9:00 pm. Basil Rathbone's last episode as the famous detective was "The Singular Affair of the Baconian Cipher". He was eager to separate himself from the show to avoid being typecast in the role. On October 12, 1946, Tom Conway replaced him in the starring role, though Nigel Bruce got top billing. The new series lasted 39 episodes, and Bruce and Conway then left the series. From then until 1950 the series continued with various actors playing the two principal parts.

The show first aired on the Blue Network but later moved to the Mutual Broadcasting System. The show moved to Mutual in 1943 at the start of its fourth season. The series was originally broadcast from Hollywood. During World War II, the show was also broadcast overseas through the Armed Forces Radio Service. The program aired on ABC instead of Mutual for its sixth and ninth seasons.

Many episodes were recorded in front of a live audience.

== Cast ==
- Sherlock Holmes:
  - Basil Rathbone (1939–1946)
  - Tom Conway (1947)
  - John Stanley (1947–1949)
  - Ben Wright (The Singular Affair of the Ancient Egyptian Curse in 1947, as stand-in for Tom Conway, 1949–1950 as a regular)
- Dr. Watson:
  - Nigel Bruce (1939–1947)
  - Joseph Kearns (The Haunting of Sherlock Holmes in 1946, stand-in for Nigel Bruce)
  - Alfred Shirley (1947–1948)
  - Ian Martin (1948)
  - Wendell Holmes (credited as "George Spelvin") (1948–1949)
  - Eric Snowden (The Terrifying Cats in 1946, as a stand-in for Nigel Bruce, 1949–1950 as a regular)

There is only a limited amount of information available about additional cast members, since complete cast lists are available only for a handful of episodes. In multiple episodes, Mary Gordon played Mrs. Hudson, a role she also played in the film series opposite Rathbone and Bruce. Professor Moriarty was played by multiple actors in the radio series, including Joseph Kearns (who also played Watson in a one-off episode) and Lou Merrill.

Frederick Worlock played Inspector Lestrade in at least three known episodes. Worlock also played different roles in multiple films in the 1939–1946 film series, such as the role of Geoffrey Musgrave in Sherlock Holmes Faces Death. Lestrade was played by Bernard Lenrow in the seventh season and Horace Braham in the eighth season. Rex Evans played Mycroft Holmes in at least two known episodes. Evans played an assassin in the Sherlock Holmes film Pursuit to Algiers.

In each episode, the announcer would be presented as arriving at the home of Dr. Watson, then retired, who would share a story about Holmes and his adventures. The announcer for the first three seasons of the show was Knox Manning. In various episodes of the fourth season, the announcers were Owen Babbe, Marx Hartman, and Bob Campbell. Harry Bartell became the announcer for the fifth season. The announcer for the sixth season was Joseph Bell. Bell had previously been the announcer for The Adventures of Sherlock Holmes. Cy Harrice took over the role for the seventh and eighth seasons. Herb Allen was the announcer for the ninth season.

Actors who performed in multiple roles on the show include Verna Felton, Paula Winslowe, Carl Harbord (who also played Inspector Hopkins in the Sherlock Holmes film Dressed to Kill), Herbert Rawlinson, Paul Frees, Theodore von Eltz, and June Foray.

== Sponsors ==
The show's announcer acted as the spokesman for the sponsor. Grove's Bromo Quinine sponsored the show for the first three seasons. Petri Wine was the sponsor for the fourth and fifth seasons. Petri Wine stopped sponsoring the show after the end of the fifth season. While Rathbone left the show at the same time, the reason Petri ceased their sponsorship was unconnected to Rathbone's departure according to one source, which states that the decision was made because it was more affordable for Petri to sponsor the radio series The Casebook of Gregory Hood instead.

The sponsor for the series was Kreml Hair Tonic for the show's sixth season, and the Trimount Clothing Co. for the seventh season. Trimount renewed their sponsorship for the eighth season. Petri Wine returned as the sponsor for the ninth season. By May 1950, it was confirmed that Petri did not plan to renew their sponsorship if the series continued.

== Episodes ==
Season 1 (October 2, 1939 – March 11, 1940; 24 episodes) started with an adaptation of "The Adventure of the Sussex Vampire" and ended with an adaptation of "The Adventure of the Retired Colourman". The last episode of the season was originally intended to be an adaptation of "The Final Problem". It is not known why the change was made, but it may be because "The Final Problem" had already been used on radio several times. It was announced on the penultimate show that "The Final Problem" would be the last episode; in the final episode, Watson said he had changed his mind about which story he was going to tell.

Season 2 (September 29, 1940 – March 9, 1941; 24 episodes) started with an adaptation of "The Adventure of the Empty House". The last episode was an adaptation of "The Adventure of Shoscombe Old Place". The season included a six-episode serial adapted from The Hound of the Baskervilles.

Season 3 (5 October 1941 – March 1, 1942; 22 episodes) started with an adaptation of "The Adventure of the Illustrious Client" and ended with an episode titled "The Giant Rat of Sumatra". An episode also titled "The Giant Rat of Sumatra", inspired by a reference in "The Adventure of the Sussex Vampire", had previously aired in 1932 in the second season of the radio series The Adventures of Sherlock Holmes.

Season 4 (May 7, 1943 – May 28, 1945; 109 episodes) started with a dramatization of "The Adventure of the Copper Beeches". The last episode of the season is titled "Dance of Death". According to the Pittsburgh Press, Nigel Bruce "astounded sound engineers" by imitating the sound of a seagull required for the episode "Death in Cornwall", which aired on February 7, 1944. Some episodes in this season and the following two seasons were novelized by H. Paul Jeffers in his 2005 book The Forgotten Adventures of Sherlock Holmes.

Season 6 (September 3, 1945 – May 27, 1946; 39 episodes) started with an episode titled "The Case of the Limping Ghost", based on an incident in "The Adventure of the Crooked Man". The last episode of the season was "The Singular Affair of the Baconian Cipher", suggested by an incident in The Sign of Four. This was the last season with Basil Rathbone playing Sherlock Holmes. Rathbone and Bruce also appeared on the CBS radio program Request Performance in November 1945, and swapped roles as Holmes and Watson in a short sketch performance on the program. Some of the episodes in this season were novelized by Ken Greenwald in his book The Lost Adventures of Sherlock Holmes (1989).

Season 7 (October 12, 1946 – July 7, 1947; 39 episodes) started with the episode "The Adventure of the Stuttering Ghost", suggested by an incident in "The Adventure of the Noble Bachelor". The season ended with "The Adventure of the Iron Maiden". This was the last season with Nigel Bruce playing Watson.

Season 8 (September 28, 1947 – June 20, 1948; 39 episodes) started with "The Case of the Dog Who Changed His Mind" and ended with an adaptation of "The Adventure of the Veiled Lodger".

Season 9 (September 12, 1948 – June 6, 1949; 39 episodes) started with an episode titled "The Case of the Unwelcome Ambassador" and ended with an episode titled "The Adventure of the Red Death".

Season 10 (September 21, 1949 – June 14, 1950; 39 episodes) started with an episode with an unknown title. The second episode, which aired on September 28, 1949, was titled "The Eloquent Corpse". Many of this season's episodes, including the last two episodes, have unknown titles. The last episode with a known title is "Command Performance", which aired on May 31, 1950.

Scripts of some missing episodes have been published by Purview Press. 'Sherlock Holmes:The Lost Radio Scripts' (ISBN 978-1617094729), 'Sherlock Holmes: More Lost Radio Scripts' (ISBN 978-1617095351) edited by Ian Dickerson.
