= This Used to Be Our Town =

Single by Jason McCoy

from the album Jason McCoy
- Released: May 22, 1995
- Genre: Country
- Length: 3:46
- Label: MCA
- Songwriters: Denny Carr; Jason McCoy; Chris Lindsey
- Producer: Scott Baggett

Jason McCoy singles chronology
| "Ghosts" (1995) | "This Used to Be Our Town" (1995) | "Learning a Lot About Love" (1995) |

"This Used to Be Our Town" is a single by Canadian country music artist Jason McCoy. Released in 1995, it was the fourth single from his album Jason McCoy. The song reached #1 on the RPM Country Tracks chart in July 1995.

== Chart performance ==
| Chart (1995) | Peak position |
|---|---|
| Canada Country Singles (RPM) | 1 |

=== Year-end charts ===
| Chart (1995) | Position |
|---|---|
| Canada Country Tracks (RPM) | 3 |
