= Kind of Like It's Love =

2000 song performed by Jason McCoy

Single by Jason McCoy

from the album Honky Tonk Sonatas
- Released: 2000
- Genre: Country
- Length: 3:00
- Label: Universal Music Canada
- Songwriters: Jim Lauderdale; John Leventhal
- Producer: Scott Baggett

Jason McCoy singles chronology
"There's More Where That Came From" (1998)	"Kind of Like It's Love" (2000)	"Bury My Heart" (2000)

"Kind of Like It's Love" is a song recorded by Canadian country music artist Jason McCoy. It was released in 2000 as the first single from his fourth studio album, Honky Tonk Sonatas. It peaked at number 3 on the RPM Country Tracks chart in September 2000.

== Chart performance ==
Chart (2000)	Peak position
Canada Country Singles (RPM)	3
