= Born Again in Dixieland =

Single by Jason McCoy

from the album Playin' for Keeps
- Released: June 18, 1997
- Genre: Country
- Length: 3:25
- Label: Universal
- Songwriters: Jason McCoy; Naoise Sheridan; Denny Carr
- Producer: Scott Baggett

Jason McCoy singles chronology
"All the Way" (1996)	"Born Again in Dixieland" (1997)	"Heaven Help Her Heart" (1997)

"Born Again in Dixieland" is a song co-written and recorded by Canadian country music artist Jason McCoy. Released in June 1997, it was the lead single from his album Playin' for Keeps. The song reached #3 on the RPM Country Tracks chart in September 1997. The song won a SOCAN Song of the Year award.

== Background and writing ==
McCoy said that he started writing the song with Sheridan and he was playing songs for MCA Canada label and they asked if he had any other songs. He played a verse and the chorus from the song thinking it wasn't that good and they wouldn't like it. Instead they liked it and McCoy lied to them and said the song was fully done. He cut the song throughout the night without the full lyrics being finished.

== Music video ==
A music video directed by Robert Cuffley premiered in June 1997. Cuffley won a 1998 CCMA award for his work on the video.

== Chart performance ==
"Born Again in Dixieland" debuted at number 74 on the Canadian RPM Country Tracks for the week of June 23, 1997.

Chart (1997)	Peak position
Canada Country Singles (RPM)	3

=== Year-end charts ===
Chart (1997)	Position
Canada Country Tracks (RPM)	14
