= A Little Bit of You (Jason McCoy song) =

Single by Jason McCoy

from the album Playin' for Keeps
- Released: 1998
- Genre: Country
- Length: 2:56
- Label: Universal Music Canada
- Songwriters: Craig Wiseman; Jason McCoy; Sonny Burgess
- Producer: Scott Baggett

Jason McCoy singles chronology
"Heaven Help Her Heart" (1997)	"A Little Bit of You" (1998)	"I'm Gonna Make Her Mine" (1998)

"A Little Bit of You" is a song recorded by Canadian country music artist Jason McCoy. It was released in 1998 as the third single from his third studio album, Playin' for Keeps. It peaked at number 3 on the RPM Country Tracks chart in April 1998.

== Chart performance ==
Chart (1998)	Peak position
Canada Country Singles (RPM)	3

=== Year-end charts ===
Chart (1998)	Position
Canada Country Tracks (RPM)	24
