= Hank Mills =

American composer

Hank Mills (April 9, 1936 – November 11, 2005) was the pen name taken by country songwriter Samuel Garrett. Mills authored a number of country and western hits of the 1960s and 1970s, including 3 BMI award winners: "Girl on the Billboard" (written with Walter Haynes) was a #1 hit for Grand Ole Opry singer Del Reeves in 1965; "Kay" a #9 recorded by John Wesley Ryles, "Little Ole Wine Drinker Me" (written w/ Dick Jennings), as performed by Dean Martin. reached #38 on Billboard's Top 40 charts in 1967; and "Angel's Sunday" reached #13 on Billboard's country music charts in 1971 for country crooner Jim Ed Brown, Mills also appeared in and wrote songs for the 1967 Southeastern Pictures film Cottonpickin' Chickenpickers.

Other notable songs include "Send Me No Roses", "One Bum Town", "Walkin' Bum", "It Keeps Slipping My Mind", "My Big Truck Drivin' Man", "Big Job", "Great Big Spirit of Love", "I Can't Go On Loving You", "Kay", "After Effects (From Loving You), "If I Were A Little Girl", "An Old Bridge", "Prayer From A Mobile Home", "Nothing To Write Home About", "White Lightning Express" and "Facing the Wall".

He was born in Spice, West Virginia and died in Hagerstown, Maryland.
