= Candle (Jason McCoy song) =

Single by Jason McCoy

from the album Jason McCoy
- Released: December 4, 1995
- Genre: Country
- Length: 3:07
- Label: MCA
- Songwriters: Terrine Barnes; Jason McCoy
- Producer: Scott Baggett

Jason McCoy singles chronology
"Learning a Lot About Love" (1995)	"Candle" (1995)	"All the Way" (1996)

"Candle" is a single by Canadian country music artist Jason McCoy. Released in 1995, it was the sixth single from his album Jason McCoy. The song reached #1 on the RPM Country Tracks chart in March 1996.

== Content ==
McCoy said that he wrote the song for his sister who was a single parent early in her life.

== Chart performance ==
Chart (1995–1996)	Peak position
Canada Country Singles (RPM)	1

=== Year-end charts ===
Chart (1996)	Position
Canada Country Tracks (RPM)	20
