= I'm Gonna Make Her Mine =

Single by Jason McCoy

from the album Playin' for Keeps
- Released: 1998
- Genre: Country
- Length: 3:17
- Label: Universal Music Canada
- Songwriters: Jason McCoy; Chris Lindsey
- Producer: Scott Baggett

Jason McCoy singles chronology
"A Little Bit of You" (1998)	"I'm Gonna Make Her Mine" (1998)	"There's More Where That Came From" (1998)

"I'm Gonna Make Her Mine" is a song recorded by Canadian country music artist Jason McCoy. It was released in 1998 as the fourth single from his third studio album, Playin' for Keeps. It peaked at number 15 on the RPM Country Tracks chart in August 1998.

== Chart performance ==
Chart (1998)	Peak position
Canada Country Singles (RPM)	15

=== Year-end charts ===
Chart (1998)	Position
Canada Country Tracks (RPM)	71
