= Learning a Lot About Love =

Single by Jason McCoy

from the album Jason McCoy
- Released: August 28, 1995
- Genre: Country
- Length: 3:35
- Label: MCA
- Songwriters: Terrine Barnes; Jason McCoy
- Producer: Scott Baggett

Jason McCoy singles chronology
| "This Used to Be Our Town" (1995) | "Learning a Lot About Love" (1995) | "Candle" (1995) |

"Learning a Lot About Love" is a single by Canadian country music artist Jason McCoy. Released in 1995, it was the fifth single from his album Jason McCoy. The song reached #1 on the RPM Country Tracks chart in November 1995.

== Content ==
McCoy said he wrote the song about when he and his wife had a fight before they were married and his mom said "well, I guess you're learning about love, aren't you?"

== Chart performance ==
| Chart (1995) | Peak position |
|---|---|
| Canada Country Singles (RPM) | 1 |

=== Year-end charts ===
| Chart (1995) | Position |
|---|---|
| Canada Country Tracks (RPM) | 5 |
