= The Road Hammers =

Canadian country rock group

- The Road Hammers in 2026

Background information
- Origin: Canada
- Genres: Country rock
- Years active: 2005–2010, 2013–present
- Labels: Skysong; Open Road; Montage
- Members: Jason McCoy; Clayton Bellamy; Chris Byrne
- Past members: Corbett Frasz

The Road Hammers are a Canadian country rock group composed of Jason McCoy, Clayton Bellamy and Chris Byrne. Formed by McCoy as a side project, the trio's music is influenced by 1960s and 1970s trucker music and southern rock. Their first self-titled album included remakes of several classic truck-driving songs. It was recognized with a Juno Award in 2006, along with numerous Canadian Country Music Association awards. After five years together, the group went on hiatus after one last show on December 31, 2010, in Langley, British Columbia. The group reformed in 2013 and released Wheels in 2014. In May 2017, The Road Hammers released their latest album, The Squeeze.

== History ==
The Road Hammers was founded in 2004 as a project by lead singer and guitarist Jason McCoy, a multiple-time winner of Canadian Country Music Association male vocalist of the year. He stated the idea was to play trucker music, and came together with two other musicians with similar views on music - country-rocker Clayton Bellamy, whose father is a truck driver, and bassist Chris Byrne, a Newfoundlander. In addition to recording their self-titled album, the Road Hammers was also the subject of a reality show of the same name on Country Music Television in Canada.

The album The Road Hammers was released in 2005, and received strong reviews for its southern rock sound and covers of classic songs. It debuted at No. 1 on the Canadian country albums chart. Covers on the album included "Girl on the Billboard," the 1965 number-one hit for Del Reeves, "East Bound and Down" by Jerry Reed, and Little Feat's "Willin'." In the wake of the album release, The Road Hammers swept to the upper end of the Canadian country charts; four songs reached the top 10 through 2005 and 2006, and the band was nominated for six CCMA Awards winning Group or Duo of the Year. It was also recognized at the Juno Awards for Country Recording of the Year. The album's success continued into 2006, with the Road Hammers receiving two CCMA awards, Group or Duo of the Year and Best Video.

In July 2007, McCoy stated that the band will be part of a second season of its reality show, following its attempts to secure a recording deal with an American label. In late 2007, The Road Hammers signed to an American record label, Montage Music Group and the group's debut American single, "I Don't Know When to Quit" was released on December 10. Their second album, entitled Blood, Sweat, and Steel, was released on June 24, 2008.

The Road Hammers released their second Canadian album, The Road Hammers II, on February 24, 2009. The album's first single, "Homegrown," has reached the Top 20 of the Canadian country singles chart.

Bellamy and McCoy were contestants on the reality show Mantracker on September 6, 2010, where they both beat the hunters to the finish line. On October 8, 2013, The Road Hammers released a single titled "Get On Down the Road" on iTunes in Canada and the United States.

In 2025, the Road Hammers signed with a new independent label Skysong Records, which McCoy and Bellamy co-founded alongside Dan Davidson and Craig Senyk. The band embarked on the "Til the Wheels Fall Off Tour" across Canada in early 2026 alongside fellow Canadian country band Doc Walker.

== Discography ==
=== Studio albums ===
Title	Album details	Peak chart positions			Certifications (sales threshold)
Title	Album details	CAN	US Country	US Heat	Certifications (sales threshold)
The Road Hammers	Release date: May 10, 2005; Label: Open Road	—	—	—	MC: Platinum
Blood Sweat & Steel	Release date: June 24, 2008; Label: Montage	—	50	39	
The Road Hammers II	Release date: February 24, 2009; Label: Open Road	—	—	—	
Wheels	Release date: June 3, 2014; Label: Open Road	21	—	—	
The Squeeze	Release date: May 12, 2017; Label: Open Road				
10 Big Truckin' Hits, Vol. 1	Release date: April 21, 2018; Label: Open Road				
"—" denotes releases that did not chart.

=== Extended plays ===
Title	Details
Back at It	Release date: April 17, 2021; Label: Airstrip Music Inc.

=== Singles ===
==== 2000s ====
Year	Title	Peak chart positions			Album
Year	Title	CAN	CAN Country	US Country	Album
2005	"I'm a Road Hammer"	—	5	—	The Road Hammers
2005	"East Bound and Down"	—	2	—	The Road Hammers
2006	"Nashville Bound"	—	9	—	The Road Hammers
2006	"Girl on the Billboard"	—	5	—	The Road Hammers
2007	"I Don't Know When to Quit"	—	—	51	Blood Sweat & Steel
2008	"Girl on the Billboard" (US release)	—	—	54	Blood Sweat & Steel
2008	"I've Got the Scars to Prove It"	—	—	—	Blood Sweat & Steel
2008	"Homegrown"	87	11	—	The Road Hammers II
2009	"I've Got the Scars to Prove It" (Canadian release)	86	10	—	The Road Hammers II
2009	"Goodbye Dust"	—	18	—	The Road Hammers II
"—" denotes releases that did not chart.

==== 2010s and 2020s ====
Year	Title	Peak chart positions		Certifications (sales threshold)	Album
Year	Title	CAN	CAN Country	Certifications (sales threshold)	Album
2013	"Get On Down the Road"	82	12		Wheels
2014	"Mud"	68	16	MC: Platinum	Wheels
2014	"I've Been Everywhere"	—	27		Wheels
2015	"Hillbilly Highway" (feat. Colt Ford)	—	43		Wheels
2015	"One Horse Town" (with Tim Hicks)	—	41		The Squeeze
2017	"Crazy About You"	—	7		The Squeeze
2017	"Your Love Is the Drug"	—	28		The Squeeze
2018	"All Your Favorite Bands"	—	46		The Squeeze
2021	"The Boys Are Back at It"	—	40		Back at It
2021	"Give'r"	—	49		Back at It
2025	"Dirty Hands Clean Money"	—	40		Til The Wheels Fall Off
"—" denotes releases that did not chart

=== Guest singles ===
Year	Single	Artist	Peak positions	Album
Year	Single	Artist	CAN Country	Album
2014	"Run"	Blackjack Billy (with Doc Walker)	35	—N/a
2021	"Roll With It"	Dan Davidson	—	6 Songs to Midnight

=== Music videos ===
Year	Video	Director
2005	"I'm a Road Hammer"	Margaret Malandruccolo
2005	"East Bound and Down"	Milton Sneed
2006	"Girl on the Billboard"	Margaret Malandruccolo
2008	"Homegrown"	Roger Pistole
2009	"I've Got the Scars to Prove It"	Geoff McLean/Christopher Mills
2013	"Get On Down the Road"	Margaret Malandruccolo
2014	"Mud"	Margaret Malandruccolo
2014	"I've Been Everywhere"	Sean Smith
2014	"Run" (with Blackjack Billy and Doc Walker)	
2015	"Hillbilly Highway" (with Colt Ford)	Sean Smith
2015	"Wheels"	
2015	"One Horse Town" (with Tim Hicks)	
2017	"You're Love Is The Drug"	
2017	"Haulin' Ass"	
2018	"All Your Favorite Bands"	
2019	"Zamboni"	

== Awards and nominations ==
Year	Association	Category	Result
2005	Canadian Country Music Association	Group or Duo of the Year	Won
2005	Canadian Country Music Association	Chevy Trucks Rising Star Award	Nominated
2005	Canadian Country Music Association	Album of the Year – The Road Hammers	Nominated
2005	Canadian Country Music Association	Single of the Year – "I'm a Road Hammer"	Nominated
2005	Canadian Country Music Association	CMT Video of the Year – "I'm a Road Hammer"	Nominated
2006	Juno Awards of 2006	Country Recording of the Year – The Road Hammers	Won
2006	Canadian Country Music Association	Kraft Cheez Whiz Fans' Choice Award	Nominated
2006	Canadian Country Music Association	Group or Duo of the Year	Won
2006	Canadian Country Music Association	Single of the Year – "East Bound and Down"	Nominated
2006	Canadian Country Music Association	CMT Video of the Year – "East Bound and Down"	Won
2006	Canadian Country Music Association	Top Selling Album of the Year – The Road Hammers	Nominated
2007	Canadian Country Music Association	Group or Duo of the Year	Nominated
2010	Juno Awards of 2010	Country Album of the Year – The Road Hammers II	Nominated
2010	Canadian Country Music Association	Group or Duo of the Year	Nominated
2014	Canadian Country Music Association	Group or Duo of the Year	Nominated
2015	Juno Awards of 2015	Country Album of the Year – Wheels	Nominated
2015	Canadian Country Music Association	Group or Duo of the Year	Nominated
2017	Canadian Country Music Association	Group or Duo of the Year	Won
