= Del Reeves =

American country music singer (1932–2007)

Background information
- Born: Franklin Delano Reeves; July 14, 1932; Sparta, North Carolina, U.S.
- Died: January 1, 2007 (aged 74) Centerville, Tennessee, U.S.
- Genre: Country
- Occupations: Singer, Songwriter
- Years active: 1945–2006
- Labels: Capitol, Decca, Columbia, Reprise, United Artists

Franklin Delano Reeves (July 14, 1932 – January 1, 2007) was an American country music singer, best known for his "girl-watching" novelty songs of the 1960s including "Girl on the Billboard" and "The Belles of Southern Bell". He is also known for his 1968 trucker's anthem, "Looking at the World Through a Windshield", which demonstrated he was capable of more than just novelty songs. He became one of the most successful male country singers of the 1960s, becoming a member of the Grand Ole Opry in 1966 and remaining a regular performer for 40 years, until his death.

== Early life ==
Reeves was born in Sparta, North Carolina, in July, 1932, the youngest of 11 children. He was named after U.S. President Franklin Delano Roosevelt. While his older brothers served in World War II, Reeves learned how to play their musical instruments. By age 12, Reeves began performing on the Merry Go Round Show on local radio station WPAQ.

After high school, Reeves briefly attended Appalachian State Teachers College. He later enlisted in the United States Air Force, stationed at Travis Air Force Base in Fairfield, California.

== Music career ==
=== 1950s ===
After completing his military service, Reeves began performing regularly on Chester Smith's radio show on Modesto station KTRB around 1955. Reeves made his first rockabilly recordings with Capitol Records from 1957 to 1958.

In 1958, Reeves began hosting a television variety show on Stockton station KOVR.

=== 1960s–2000s ===
In 1961, Reeves signed with Decca Records and recorded the song that would become his first charting single, "Be Quiet Mind". Moving to Nashville in 1962, Reeves and wife Ellen Schiell co-wrote "Sing a Little Song of Heartache", a top-five hit for Rose Maddox that year.

After stints with Reprise Records in 1963 and Columbia Records in 1964, Reeves signed with United Artists Records. Reeves became known as "the Doodle-Oo-Doo-Doo Kid" for the sound effect he added to his songs.

Under United Artists, he had his first number-one hit with "The Girl on the Billboard" in 1965. His follow-up, "The Belles of the Southern Bell", made the country top five. His success continued throughout the rest of the 1960s. Songs that became hits during this time are "Be Glad" and "Good Time Charlie's". In the late 1960s, he appeared in several Hollywood films, including a starring role in Cottonpickin' Chickenpickers, and a supporting role in Burt Reynolds' first big movie Sam Whiskey.

In the 1970s, he released a series of duets with Bobby Goldsboro and Penny DeHaven. He also returned to television, hosting the syndicated TV program, Del Reeves' Country Carnival.

His last big hit was "The Philadelphia Fillies". His career declined in the mid-1970s, and then started to slowly move away from country music, although he recorded some duets with Billie Jo Spears in 1976. He had hit songs on the country chart most years until 1982.

In 1979, Reeves left his musical career to pursue a career as a music executive; he eventually helped Billy Ray Cyrus score his first major record deal. He continued to record in the 1980s on a reduced scale for smaller labels.

== Discography ==
=== Albums ===
Year	Album	US Country
1965	Mr. Country Music	—
1965	Girl on the Billboard	8
1965	Doodle-Oo-Doo-Doo	6
1966	Sings Jim Reeves	23
1966	Special Delivery	28
1966	Gettin' Any Feed for Your Chickens	18
1966	Santa's Boy	—
1967	Struttin' My Stuff	22
1967	Six of One, Half a Dozen of the Other	42
1967	The Little Church in the Dell	—
1967	Our Way of Life	28
1968	Running Wild	35
1968	The Best	—
1968	Looking at the World	33
1969	Wonderful World of Country Music	—
1969	Down at the Goodtime Charlie's	42
1969	Friends and Neighbors	—
1970	Big Daddy Del	41
1970	Country Concert	—
1970	The Best 2	—
1971	Del Reeves	36
1972	Before Goodbye	45
1973	Trucker's Paradise	—
1974	Live at the Palomino Club	45
1974	The Very Best	42
1975	With Strings and Things	—
1976	By Request (with Billie Jo Spears)	46
1976	10th Anniversary	—
1980	Let's Go to Heaven Tonight	—
1994	His Greatest Hits	—
1996	Gospel	—
1998	I'll Take My Chances	—

=== Singles ===
Year	Single	Chart Positions		Album
Year	Single	US Country	CAN Country	Album
1961	"Be Quiet Mind"	9	—	singles only
1962	"He Stands Real Tall"	11	—	singles only
1963	"The Only Girl I Can't Forget"	13	—	singles only
1964	"Talking to the Night Lights"	41	—	singles only
1965	"Girl on the Billboard"^{A}	1	—	Girl on the Billboard
1965	"The Belles of the Southern Bell"	4	—	Girl on the Billboard
1965	"Women Do Funny Things to Me"	9	—	Doodle-Oo-Doo-Doo
1966	"One Bum Town"	42	—	Special Delivery
1966	"Gettin' Any Feed for Your Chickens"	37	—	Gettin' Any Feed for Your Chickens
1966	"This Must Be the Bottom"	27	—	Struttin' My Stuff
1967	"Blame It on My Do Wrong"	45	—	Six of One, Half a Dozen of the Other
1967	"The Private"	33	—	The Best of Del Reeves
1967	"A Dime at a Time"	12	—	Our Way of Life
1968	"I Just Wasted the Rest" (with Bobby Goldsboro)	56	—	Our Way of Life
1968	"Wild Blood"	18	5	Running Wild
1968	"Looking at the World Through a Windshield"	5	4	Looking at the World
1968	"Good Time Charlie's"	3	20	Down at the Goodtime Charlie's
1969	"Be Glad"	5	—	Down at the Goodtime Charlie's
1969	"There Wouldn't Be a Lonely Heart in Town"	12	—	Big Daddy Del
1969	"Take a Little Good Will Home" (with Bobby Goldsboro)	31	31	Our Way of Life
1970	"A Lover's Question" (with the Goodtime Charlies)	14	—	The Best 2
1970	"Son of a Coal Man"	41	21	Friends and Neighbors
1970	"Landmark Tavern" (with Penny DeHaven)	20	24	singles only
1970	"Bad, Bad Tuesday"	—	41	singles only
1970	"Right Back Loving You Again"	22	21	Friends and Neighbors
1971	"Bar Room Talk"	30	7	Friends and Neighbors
1971	"Workin' Like the Devil for the Lord"	33	—	Friends and Neighbors
1971	"The Philadelphia Fillies"	9	38	Del Reeves
1971	"Dozen Pairs of Boots"	31	49	Del Reeves
1972	"The Best Is Yet to Come"	29	—	Del Reeves
1972	"No Rings, No Strings"	62	—	Before Goodbye
1972	"Crying in the Rain" (with Penny DeHaven)	54	—	single only
1972	"Before Goodbye"	47	—	Before Goodbye
1973	"Trucker's Paradise"	54	86	Trucker's Paradise
1973	"Mm-Mm Good"	44	31	single only
1973	"Lay a Little Lovin' on Me"	22	63	The Very Best of Del Reeves
1974	"What a Way to Go"	70	—	singles only
1974	"Prayer from a Mobile Home"	62	—	singles only
1974	"She Likes Country Bands"	89	—	singles only
1974	"Pour It All on Me"	65	—	Strings and Things
1975	"But I Do"	65	—	Strings and Things
1975	"Puttin' In Overtime at Home"	74	—	Strings and Things
1975	"You Comb Her Hair Every Morning"	92	—	single only
1976	"I Ain't Got Nobody"	51	—	10th Anniversary
1976	"On the Rebound" (with Billie Jo Spears)	29	—	By Request
1976	"Teardrops Will Kiss the Morning Dew" (with Billie Jo Spears)	42	—	By Request
1976	"My Better Half"	79	—	singles only
1977	"Ladies' Night"	78	—	singles only
1978	"When My Angel Turns into a Devil"	93	—	singles only
1978	"Dig Down Deep"	79	—	singles only
1980	"Take Me to Your Heart"	82	—	Del Reeves
1980	"What Am I Gonna Do?"	90	—	Del Reeves
1981	"Swinging Doors"	67	—	singles only
1981	"Slow Hand"	53	—	singles only
1982	"Ain't Nobody Gonna Get My Body but You"	67	—	singles only
1986	"The Second Time Around"	95	—	Here's Del Reeves

- ^{A}Peaked at No. 96 on Billboard Hot 100 and No. 31 on the RPM Top Singles chart in Canada.

=== Music videos ===
Year	Video
1994	"Girl on the Billboard"

== Personal life ==
Reeves married Ellen Schiell in 1956 at the Stanislaus County Fair in California; they had three children. Reeves died of emphysema on January 1, 2007, at age 74, at his home in Centerville, Tennessee.
