= Clayton Bellamy =

Canadian singer-songwriter

- Born
- Origin: Bonnyville, Alberta, Canada
- Genres: Country rock n roll
- Occupations: Singer-songwriter, radio personality record producer
- Instruments: Guitar; Vocals harmonica
- Labels: MDM Recordings Inc. EMI Music Canada; Open Road Recordings Anthem Records
- Website: www.claytonbellamy.com

Clayton Bellamy is a Canadian singer-songwriter. He grew up in Bonnyville, Alberta, before his family settled in Nashville, Tennessee.

He has won many awards including a JUNO for Best Country Recording, a five time Canadian Country Music Award winner Canadian Country Music Awards, and SOCAN Songwriter of the Year award, Radio Music Award song of the year, five CMAB awards for song, video, Entertainer, Group, and Roots Artist. Clayton has dominated the stage performing at the Grand Ole Opry has been featured in People Magazine, The New York Times, and Rolling Stone and performed for President Carter. He has released five solo studio records and has had songs recorded by Big Sugar, Matt Anderson, Grady, Dan Davidson, Jason Blaine, W3apons, The Standstills FKB, Willie Mack, Hayley Jensen, and many more. He has had top ten singles in both Country and Active Rock radio.

Bellamy is also one of the three members of the group The Road Hammers, the highest selling Canadian Country group in Canadian history. They have released five studio albums, in addition to charting twelve singles in Canada with two number one singles and two in the United States. He tours with The Road Hammers and his rock n roll band Clayton Bellamy & The Congregation, who have released two albums.

== Discography ==
=== Studio albums ===
Title	Details
Running on Empty	Release date: Sept 1 1999; Label:
The Clayton Bellamy Band	Release date: June 11, 2001; Label:
Everyone’s a Dreamer	Release date: Sept 1 2012; Label: MDM
Five Crow Silver	Release date: June 11, 2013; Label: MDM
Welcome to the Congregation	Release date: Sept 1 2019; Label: Anthem
The Ugly Truth	Release date: Nov 2022; Label: Monkey Nerve/FUGA

=== Singles ===
Year	Title	Peak positions	Album
Year	Title	CAN Country	Album
2012	"Everyone's a Dreamer"	22	Everyone's a Dreamer
2012	"That Ain't Gonna Fly"	—	Everyone's a Dreamer
2012	"Straight Into the Sun"	49	Everyone's a Dreamer
2013	"Goodbye America"	—	Five Crow Silver
2013	"Days Aren't Long Enough" (with Kelly Prescott)	—	Five Crow Silver
"—" denotes releases that did not chart

=== Music videos ===
Year	Video	Director
2012	"Everyone's a Dreamer"	
2012	"That Ain't Gonna Fly"	Sean Smith
2012	"Straight Into the Sun"	Sean Smith

== Awards ==
- 1 SOCAN Songwriter of the Year
- 4 CCMA Award
- 1 Juno Award Best Country Recording
- Western Canadian Music Award for Best Country Recording
- Radio Music Award Recipient
