= Jason McCoy =

Canadian country singer-songwriter (born 1970)

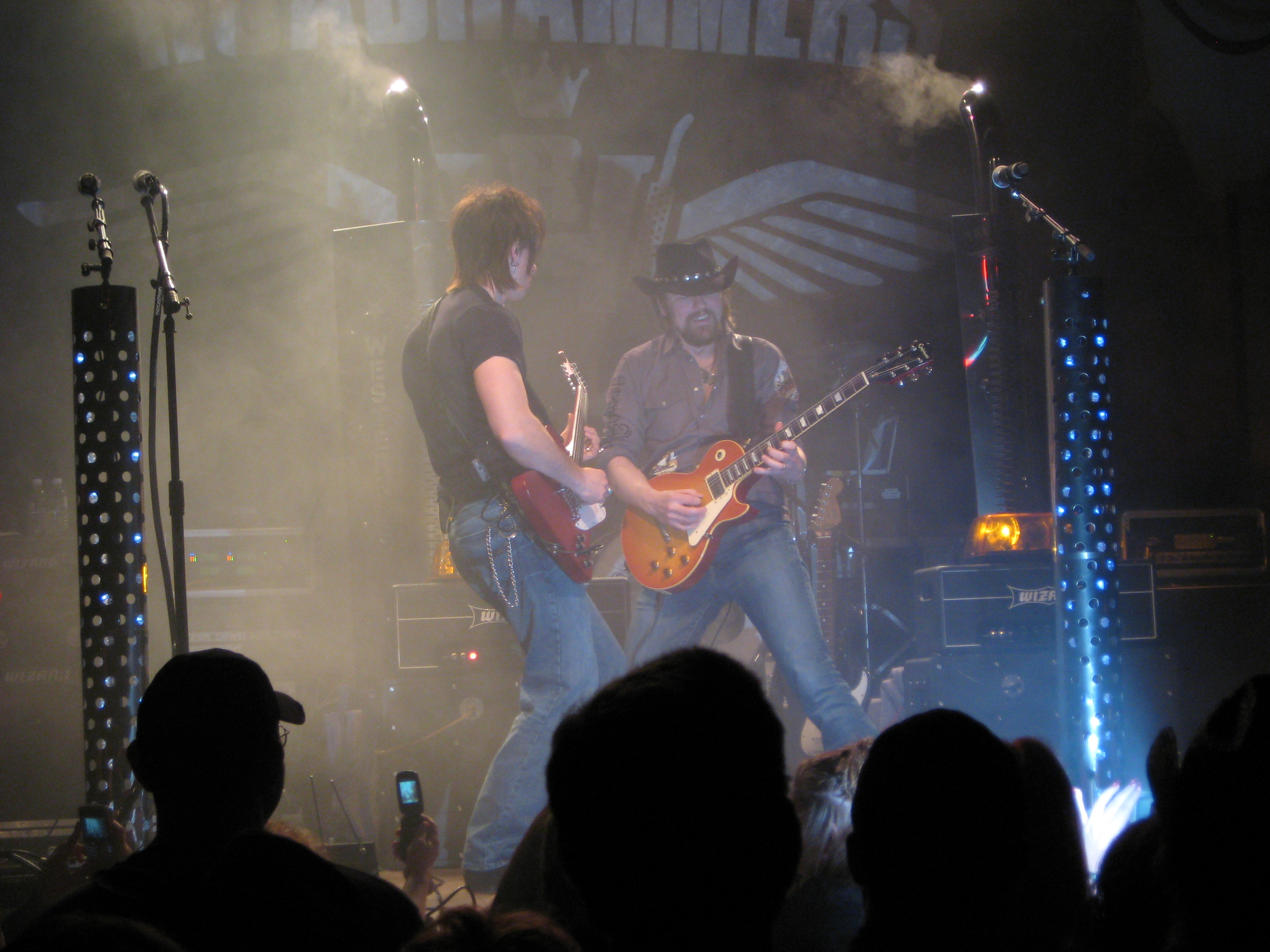
- Jason McCoy performing with the Road Hammers, April 2009

Background information
- Born: Jason Dwight Campsall; August 27, 1970 (age 56); Barrie, Ontario, Canada
- Origin: Anten Mills, Ontario, Canada
- Genres: Country
- Occupation: Singer-songwriter
- Instruments: Guitar vocals
- Years active: 1989–present
- Labels: Airstrip Music; MCA Canada; Universal; Open Road Recordings
- Website: Jasonmccoy.com

Jason Dwight Campsall (born August 27, 1970), known professionally as Jason McCoy, is a Canadian country singer-songwriter.

He has won the 2001 Male Vocalist of the Year at the Canadian Country Music Awards, 3 SOCAN Song of the Year awards, 19 CCMA nominations and 5 Juno nominations (all for Best Country Male Vocalist). He also won six awards at the 2004 Ontario Country Performer and Fan Association awards. In 2006, he was awarded the Global Artist Award at the CMA Awards in Nashville.

McCoy was also one of the three members of the group The Road Hammers, which has released two studio albums, in addition to charting four singles in Canada and one in the United States before parting ways in 2010. The group later reunited in 2013.

In 2023, he was inducted into the Canadian Country Music Hall of Fame.

== Biography ==
McCoy was born in Barrie, Ontario, and was raised for a time in Camrose, Alberta, before his family settled in Anten Mills, Ontario. At around the age of five, his family moved to Camrose, Alberta, returning three years later. "The cowboy culture really stuck with me. I just fell in love with the music. For some reason, as a little kid, I had some sort of connection with these guys who were singing about these depressing things," McCoy said, citing Merle Haggard and Johnny Cash to lesser known artists like Ed Bruce and Wynn Stewart. "I just didn't have a voice for rock 'n' roll." Jason started playing guitar at age seven and wrote his first song when he was 12.

In his teens, McCoy owned an electric guitar and was partial to AC/DC. In the 1980s, he joined a band called Three Quarter Country, which performed at legion halls, Saturday night dances, and clubs in Barrie, Midland, Orillia, and other small towns. McCoy won a talent contest in Barrie, Ontario, where he was discovered by country music writer Henry McGuirk who later became his manager and arranged for him to travel to Nashville to record an album with producer Ray Griff. He later signed with MCA Records in 1995.

On May 1, 1999, McCoy married his longtime girlfriend Terrine Barnes. The couple have two children.

McCoy was a member of the country-rock group The Road Hammers from 2005 to 2010, which also featured musicians Clayton Bellamy and Chris Byrne, and earlier, Corbett Frasz. His first album in seven years, the live Christmas at the Grand, was released on November 2, 2010, while his first studio album in eight years, Everything, was released on March 1, 2011.

In 2017, McCoy began a radio career on KICX 106 in Orillia, Ontario, while continuing his music career. After KICX was purchased by iheartradio, McCoy also began hosting syndicated programming across the Pure Country Network.

== Discography ==
=== Studio albums ===
Title	Details	Peak positions	Certifications (sales thresholds)
Title	Details	CAN Country	Certifications (sales thresholds)
Greatest Times of All	Release date: 1989; Label: Airstrip Music	—	
Jason McCoy	Release date: June 7, 1995; Label: MCA Records	2	
Playin' for Keeps	Release date: July 8, 1997; Label: Universal Records	17	CAN: Gold
Honky Tonk Sonatas	Release date: August 29, 2000; Label: Universal Records	9	
Sins, Lies and Angels	Release date: November 25, 2003; Label: Open Road Recordings	*	
Christmas at the Grand	Release date: November 2, 2010; Label: EMI	*	
Everything	Release date: March 1, 2011; Label: Open Road Recordings	*	
"—" denotes releases that did not chart * denotes unknown peak positions

=== Compilation albums ===
Title	Details
Greatest Hits 1995-2005	Release date: October 18, 2005; Label: Open Road Recordings

=== Singles ===
==== 1980s and 1990s ====
Year	Single	Peak positions	Album
Year	Single	CAN Country	Album
1989	"Slow This World Down"	36	Greatest Times of All
1990	"How Could You Hold Me"	82	Greatest Times of All
1991	"She's My Wife"	—	Greatest Times of All
1994	"Your Mama Warned You 'Bout Me"	36	Jason McCoy
1994	"Take It From Me"	40	Jason McCoy
1995	"Ghosts"	29	Jason McCoy
1995	"This Used to Be Our Town"	1	Jason McCoy
1995	"Learning a Lot About Love"	1	Jason McCoy
1995	"Candle"	1	Jason McCoy
1996	"All the Way"	4	Jason McCoy
1997	"Born Again in Dixieland"	3	Playin' for Keeps
1997	"Heaven Help Her Heart"	11	Playin' for Keeps
1998	"A Little Bit of You"	3	Playin' for Keeps
1998	"I'm Gonna Make Her Mine"	15	Playin' for Keeps
1998	"There's More Where That Came From"	18	Playin' for Keeps
"—" denotes releases that did not chart

==== 2000s and 2010s ====
Year	Single	Album
2000	"Kind of Like It's Love"^{[A]}	Honky Tonk Sonatas
2000	"Bury My Heart"	Honky Tonk Sonatas
2001	"Fix Anything"	Honky Tonk Sonatas
2001	"Ten Million Teardrops"	Honky Tonk Sonatas
2002	"I've Got a Weakness"	Honky Tonk Sonatas
2003	"Still"	Sins, Lies and Angels
2004	"I Feel a Sin Comin' On"	Sins, Lies and Angels
2004	"I Lie"	Sins, Lies and Angels
2005	"She Ain't Missin' Missin' Me"	Greatest Hits 1995–2005
2006	"I'm Not Running Anymore"	Greatest Hits 1995–2005
2011	"She's Good for Me"	Everything
2011	"I'd Still Have Everything"	Everything

Notes

- A "Kind of Like It's Love" peaked at number 3 on the Canadian RPM Country Tracks chart.

=== Music videos ===
Year	Video	Director
1995	"Ghosts"	
1995	"This Used to Be Our Town"	
1995	"Learning a Lot About Love"	Warren P. Sonoda
1995	"Candle"	
1997	"Born Again in Dixieland"	Robert Cuffley
1997	"Heaven Help Her Heart"	Jeffrey Siberry
1998	"A Little Bit of You"	
2000	"Kind of Like It's Love"	
2000	"Bury My Heart"	
2001	"Fix Anything"	Warren P. Sonoda
2001	"Ten Million Teardrops"	Warren P. Sonoda
2001	"I've Got a Weakness"	Warren P. Sonoda
2003	"Still"	Margaret Malandruccolo
2004	"I Feel a Sin Comin' On"	Margaret Malandruccolo
2005	"She Ain't Missin' Missin' Me"	Margaret Malandruccolo
2007	"I Wanna Be Your Santa Claus" (with Willie Mack)	
2011	"I'd Still Have Everything"	Warren P. Sonoda
2012	"Meet Me Under the Mistletoe"	

== Awards ==
- 6 2004 OCPFA Awards
- 1 Gold album (Playin' for Keeps)
- 19 CCMA Award Nominations
- 5 time Juno Award Male Country Vocalist of the Year Nominee
- Global Artist of the Year in 2006 for the CMA Awards
