= Brett Kissel discography =

This is the discography for Canadian country music artist Brett Kissel.

== Studio albums ==
Title	Details	Peak positions		Certifications
Title	Details	CAN	US Heat	Certifications
Keepin' It Country	Release date: September 12, 2003; Label: BAK 2 BAK Entertainment Inc.	—	—	
By Request	Release date: September 26, 2004; Label: BAK 2 BAK Entertainment Inc.	—	—	
Tried and True – A Canadian Tribute	Release date: March 5, 2006; Label: BAK 2 BAK Entertainment Inc.	—	—	
My Roots Run Deep	Release date: May 9, 2008; Label: BAK 2 BAK Entertainment Inc.	—	—	
Started with a Song	Release date: October 1, 2013; Label: Warner Music Canada	22	—	MC: Gold
Pick Me Up	Release date: September 11, 2015; Label: Warner Music Canada	7	—	MC: Gold
We Were That Song	Release date: December 8, 2017; Label: Warner Music Canada	29	—	
Now or Never	Release date: January 1, 2020; Label: Warner Music Canada	43	18	
What Is Life?	Release date: April 9, 2021; Label: Warner Music Canada / ONErpm	—	—	
The Compass Project – South Album	Release date: January 27, 2023; Label: Big Star Recordings / ONErpm	—	—	
The Compass Project – East Album	Release date: April 28, 2023; Label: Big Star Recordings / ONErpm	—	—	
The Compass Project – West Album	Release date: November 3, 2023; Label: Big Star Recordings / ONErpm	—	—	
The Compass Project – North Album	Release date: December 1, 2023; Label: Big Star Recordings / ONErpm	—	—	
Let Your Horses Run – The Album	Release date: February 28, 2025; Label: Big Star Recordings / ONErpm	—	—	
"—" denotes releases that did not chart

== Singles ==
=== As lead artist ===
Title	Year	Peak chart positions		Certifications	Album
Title	Year	CAN	CAN Country	Certifications	Album
"Started with a Song"	2013	58	3	MC: Gold	Started with a Song
"Raise Your Glass"	2013	88	7		Started with a Song
"3-2-1"	2014	52	3	MC: Platinum	Started with a Song
"Tough People Do"	2014	99	9		Started with a Song
"Something You Just Don't Forget"	2014	91	5		Started with a Song
"Airwaves"	2015	61	1	MC: Platinum	Pick Me Up
"Pick Me Up"	2015	86	6	MC: Gold	Pick Me Up
"Cool with That"	2016	—	8	MC: Gold	Pick Me Up
"I Didn't Fall in Love with Your Hair" (featuring Carolyn Dawn Johnson)	2016	88	16	MC: Platinum	Pick Me Up
"She's Desire"	2017	—	6		Pick Me Up
"We Were That Song"	2017	— (Note: "We Were That Song" did not enter the Billboard Canadian Hot 100, but peaked at number 34 on the Canadian Digital Song Sales component chart.)	4	MC: Gold	We Were That Song
"Anthem"	2018	—	8	MC: Gold	We Were That Song
"Guitars & Gasoline"	2018	—	8		We Were That Song
"Cecilia"	2018	—	8		We Were That Song
"Drink About Me"	2019	61	1	MC: Platinum	Now or Never
"She Drives Me Crazy"	2020	78	12	MC: Platinum	Now or Never
"A Few Good Stories"	2020	62	1	MC: Gold	Now or Never
"Make a Life, Not a Living"	2021	49	1	MC: Platinum	What Is Life?
"Night in the Life"	2021	—	15		What Is Life?
"Ain't the Same" (featuring 98 Degrees)	2022	— (Note: "Ain't the Same" did not enter the Billboard Canadian Hot 100, but peaked at number 31 on the Canadian Digital Song Sales component chart.)	33		The Compass Project – South Album
"Watch It"	2022	—	11		The Compass Project – South Album
"Never Have I Ever"	2023	—	22	MC: Gold	The Compass Project – South Album
"Two of Us" (with Cooper Alan)	2023	— (Note: "Two of Us" did not enter the Billboard Canadian Hot 100, but peaked at number 9 on the Canadian Digital Song Sales component chart.)	6		Let Your Horses Run
"Let Your Horses Run"	2024	89	4	MC: Gold	Let Your Horses Run
"Another One"	2024	—	7		Let Your Horses Run
"Cowboys & Dreamers"	2025	98	4		Let Your Horses Run
"Hurtin' Songs" (with Dierks Bentley)	2025	—	9		Let Your Horses Run
"—" denotes releases that did not chart

=== As featured artist ===
Year	Single	Peak positions	Album
Year	Single	CAN Country	Album
2021	"Somewhere to Drink" (Nate Haller featuring Brett Kissel and the Reklaws)	25	Party in the Back

== Christmas singles ==
Year	Single	Peak positions	Album
Year	Single	CAN Country	Album
2014	"Rockin' Around the Christmas Tree"	45	Non-album singles
2014	"Not So Perfect Christmas"	48	Non-album singles
2020	"Frosty the Snowman"	39	Non-album singles
2023	"I Want a Massey Ferguson for Christmas"	51	Non-album singles

== Promotional singles ==
Year	Single	Album
2012	"Hockey, Please Come Back"	Non-album single
2017	"Nights in the Sun" (featuring Grandpa Bear)	We Were That Song
2018	"Love Them a Little"	Non-album singles
2021	"Wannabes"	Non-album singles
2022	"Our Home"	The Compass Project – South Album
2023	"Spend a Little Time With You"	The Compass Project – East Album
2023	"Nowhere"	The Compass Project – East Album
2023	"Missin You in San Antone"	The Compass Project – West Album
2023	"Deer Blind"	The Compass Project – West Album
2024	"Close to You"	Let Your Horses Run
2025	"Get the Hell Out of This Town" (featuring Don Louis)	Let Your Horses Run
2025	"Heart to Forget"	Let Your Horses Run
2025	"The Farmer" (featuring Lee Brice)	Non-album single

== Music videos ==
Year	Video	Director
2012	"Hockey, Please Come Back"	Blake McWilliam
2013	"Started with a Song"	Margaret Malandruccolo
2013	"Raise Your Glass"	Margaret Malandruccolo
2014	"3-2-1"	Shaun Silva
2014	"Tough People Do"	Lisa Mann
2014	"Something You Just Don't Forget"	Lisa Mann
2015	"Canadian Kid"	Mike Peleshok
2015	"Airwaves"	Ben Knechtel
2015	"Pick Me Up"	Blake McWilliam
2016	"Cool with That"	Ben Knechtel
2016	"I Didn't Fall in Love with Your Hair"	
2017	"We Were That Song"	Blake McWilliam
2018	"Anthem"	Blake McWilliam
2018	"Guitars and Gasoline"	Ben Dartnell
2018	"Cecilia"	Blake McWilliam
2018	"Love Them a Little"	Jim Wright
2019	"Drink, Cuss, or Fish"	Ben Dartnell
2019	"Drink About Me"	Blake McWilliam
2020	"She Drives Me Crazy"	Emma Higgins / Brett Kissel
2020	"A Few Good Stories" (with Walk Off the Earth)	Chris Di Staulo
2020	"Coffee with Her"	
2020	"Young Enough"	Ben Dartnell
2021	"Make a Life, Not a Living"	Megan Jackson
2021	"Somewhere to Drink" (with Nate Haller and The Reklaws)	Ben Knechtel
2022	"Ain't the Same" (with 98 Degrees)	Aaron Huisman
2022	"Our Home"	
2023	"Never Have I Ever"	Ben Dartnell / Connor Scheffler
2024	"Two of Us" (with Cooper Alan	
