= The Compass Project =

- Cover for the South Album

Studio album by Brett Kissel
- Released: January 27, 2023 (South Album); April 28, 2023 (East Album); November 3, 2023 (West Album); December 1, 2023 (North Album)
- Genre: Country
- Length: 2:49:50; 35:35 (South Album); 35:34 (East Album); 40:25 (West Album); 58:16 (North Album)
- Labels: Big Star; ONErpm
- Producers: Spencer Cheyne; Brett Kissel; Karen Kosowski; Justin Kudding; Bart McKay; Thomas Salter

Brett Kissel chronology
What Is Life? (2021)	The Compass Project (2023)	Let Your Horses Run – The Album (2025)

Singles from The Compass Project
- 1. "Ain't the Same" Released: April 22, 2022; 2. "Watch It" Released: October 4, 2022; 3. "Never Have I Ever" Released: March 8, 2023

The Compass Project is the tenth studio album by Canadian country artist Brett Kissel. It is a four-part box set of albums released in 2023. The first part, South Album was released on January 27, 2023, via Big Star Recordings and ONErpm. The second part, East Album was released on April 28, 2023. The third part, West Album was released on November 3, 2023. The fourth part, North Album was released on December 1, 2023.

== Background ==
After holding desires to record a western-inspired album, an acoustic album, and a live album, Kissel made the decision to record all of these, along with a standard album in one project. The "North Album" is a live album containing live versions of Kissel's previous hits. The "East Album" is an acoustic album that Kissel intends to showcase his singer-songwriter side. The "South Album" is inspired by Nashville and the South, with Kissel noting how its songs are meant to target radio airplay. The "West Album" is intended to be a country and western album, inspired by the time Kissel has spent on his cattle ranch. Kissel views each album as a "specific direction" of his "internal compass", which provides fans with a "a 365-degree view" of his life and music, while they also "speak to all of the important sides" of his artistry. The project totals forty songs overall.

Kissel released promotional singles from each album ahead of their release. Prior to releasing the "South Album", Kissel released the tracks "Ain't the Same", "Our Home", "Watch It", and "Never Have I Ever". He released the tracks "Spend a Little Time With You" and "Nowhere" ahead of the "East Album". In August 2023, he released "Missin You in San Antone" from the West Album. He followed that up in October 2023, with the song "Deer Blind".

Kissel stated that "Watch It" is his favourite song on the album as it "shares advice and wisdom for every parent to relate to". On the "East" and "West" albums, Kissel is the sole writer on several of the songs, and remarked that he was "nervous" to see how his fans and the music industry reacted to them. He co-wrote the track "Legacy" on the "West Album" with his uncle, which was inspired by the estate fight Kissel had to save his grandfather's ranch in Alberta.

== Critical reception ==
Chad Huculak of the Edmonton Journal favourably reviewed "South Album", describing it as "precision-polished, with tracks expertly crafted to land on radio stations and playlists". He added that while there "isn't much experimentation or pushing of musical boundaries" on the album, it is nonetheless "some of the best music [Kissel has] produced in his career". Alan Cackett of NEO Music stated that the "South Album" is "certainly full of singalong songs that swim around and around your head hours after you've stopped listening," but framed the album as "passable," adding that it needed more songs like "Line in the Sand" to become an "essential listen". Andrew Ingram of Front Porch Music described the "South Album" as a "fantastic introduction" to the entire project, stating that it is "a showcase of Kissel's songwriting ability and the authentic country sound that his fans have come to love".

James Daykin of Entertainment Focus referred to the "East Album" as "a masterclass of meaning and melody," adding that "harmonies are used sparingly but effectively and there's enough drama and passion to keep you hitting repeat over and over again." An uncredited review from All Country News stated that the "East Album" is "proof that care and creativity go along way," naming "Sanctuary" and "Ten Years from Now" as standout tracks.

Daykin described the "West Album" as "a must-listen for country music enthusiasts, delivering a genuine and immersive experience from start to finish". Huculak favourably reviewed the "West Album", calling it a "straight-forward, traditional country record". He added that the album "hews close to that classic, blue-collar country music that sounds heavenly coming from an AM radio station.

In the 2025 Canadian federal election, Kissel endorsed the Conservative Party of Canada; his song, "Our Home", was the Conservative campaign theme song.

== Track listings ==
The Compass Project – South Album
No.	Title	Writer(s)	Length
1.	"Never Have I Ever"	Brett Kissel; Thomas Salter; Elizabeth Lowell Boland; Ron Lopata	3:04
2.	"Watch It"	Matt Rogers; Blake Bollinger	3:26
3.	"Ain't the Same" (with 98 Degrees)	Kissel; Karen Kosowski; Tim Nichols	3:08
4.	"That's Just You"	Kissel; Dave Thomson	2:56
5.	"Starts and Ends"	Kissel; Emily Doty; Kosowki	2:33
6.	"All I Ever Wanted"	Jacob Durrett; Justin Wilson; Weston Davis; Mitchell Tenpenny; Dallas Wilson	3:13
7.	"First Place"	Kissel; Jason Nix; Jason Gantt	2:40
8.	"Standing in the Dark"	Steve Fox; Mark Smith; Sean Smith	3:02
9.	"Our Home"	Kissel	3:37
10.	"Cadillac Ranch"	Bruce Springsteen	3:42
11.	"Line in the Sand"	Kissel	4:10
Total length:			35:35

The Compass Project – East Album
No.	Title	Writer(s)	Length
1.	"Spend a Little Time With You"	Kyle Jacobs; James House	3:26
2.	"Drive"	Kissel	4:49
3.	"Nowhere"	Jacobs; Ken Johnson	3:10
4.	"When I Get on a Memory"	Kissel; Matt Rogers	3:09
5.	"Coastline"	Ryan Paul Henderson; Matthew Albert Carins	4:02
6.	"Port Colborne"	Fox	3:33
7.	"Ten Years From Now"	Kissel	2:32
8.	"Made It"	Kissel; Emma-Lee Doty; Karen Kosowski	3:24
9.	"Meet Me in Vegas"	Jacobs; Emily West	4:08
10.	"Sanctuary" (featuring Cecilia Kissel)	Kissel; Cecilia Kissel	3:17
Total length:			35:30

The Compass Project – West Album
No.	Title	Writer(s)	Length
1.	"Missin' You in San Antone"	Kissel; Roger Springer	3:13
2.	"Oil and Cattle" (featuring George Canyon, Don Amero, and Brad Johner)	Kissel	3:42
3.	"Legacy"	Kissel; Derrick Germain	4:23
4.	"Deer Blind"	Kissel; Mike Fisher	3:26
5.	"Wichita Lineman"	Jimmy Webb	3:15
6.	"The Crib Song"	Kissel; Brenden Powers	3:18
7.	"Strait Country"	Kissel	3:52
8.	"Black Eyed Susans"	Kissel; Fox	4:20
9.	"Behind Closed Doors"	Kenny O'Dell	2:55
10.	"Queen on the River"	Kissel; Germain	3:22
11.	"Here's Hoping There'll (Always Be a Cowboy)"	George Fox	4:35
Total length:			40:25

The Compass Project – North Album (Live)
No.	Title	Writer(s)	Length
1.	"We Were That Song" (Live)	Barry Dean; Melissa Peirce; Jonathan Singleton	3:57
2.	"A Few Good Stories" (Live)	Ben Hayslip; Chris Stevens; Rhett Akins	4:46
3.	"3-2-1" (Live)	Kissel; Nichols; Marv Green	4:23
4.	"Make a Life, Not a Living" (Live)	Cary Barlowe; Brandon Day; Steven Lee Olsen	4:32
5.	"Drink About Me" (Live)	Rogers; Ben Stennis	6:20
6.	"Tough People Do" (Live)	Kissel; Hayslip; Ted Hewitt	4:52
7.	"I Didn't Fall in Love with Your Hair" (Live)	Jacobs; Rachel Bradshaw; Billy Montana	4:04
8.	"Cecilia" (Live)	Kissel; Seth Mosley; Brad Rempel	3:20
9.	"Airwaves" (Live)	Singleton; Zach Crowell; Matt Jenkins	3:37
10.	"Started With a Song" (Live)	Kissel; Craig Wiseman	4:17
11.	"Thank God I'm a Country Boy" (Live)	John Martin Sommers	4:16
12.	"Anthem" (Live)	Doty; Kosowski; Phil Barton	4:24
13.	"She Drives Me Crazy" (Live)	Kissel; Doty; Kosowski	4:22
Total length:			56:39

== Charts ==
=== Singles ===
Chart performance for singles from The Compass Project
Year	Single	Peak chart positions		Certifications
Year	Single	CAN Country	CAN Digital	Certifications
2022	"Ain't the Same"	33	31	
2022	"Watch It"	11	—	
2023	"Never Have I Ever"	22	—	MC: Gold
"—" denotes a single that did not chart

== Awards and nominations ==
Year	Association	Category	Nominated work	Result	Ref.
2024	Juno Awards	Country Album of the Year	The Compass Project - South Album	Nominated	
2024	Canadian Country Music Association	Alternative Country Album of the Year	The Compass Project - West Album	Won	
2025	Juno Awards	Country Album of the Year	The Compass Project - West Album	Nominated	

== Release history ==
Release formats for The Compass Project – South Album
Country	Date	Format	Label	Ref.
Canada	January 27, 2023	Digital download	Big Star Recordings	
Canada	January 27, 2023	Streaming	Big Star Recordings	
Various	January 27, 2023	Digital download	Brett Kissel	
Various	January 27, 2023	Streaming	Brett Kissel	
