= Chris Di Staulo =

Canadian film director (1990–2025)

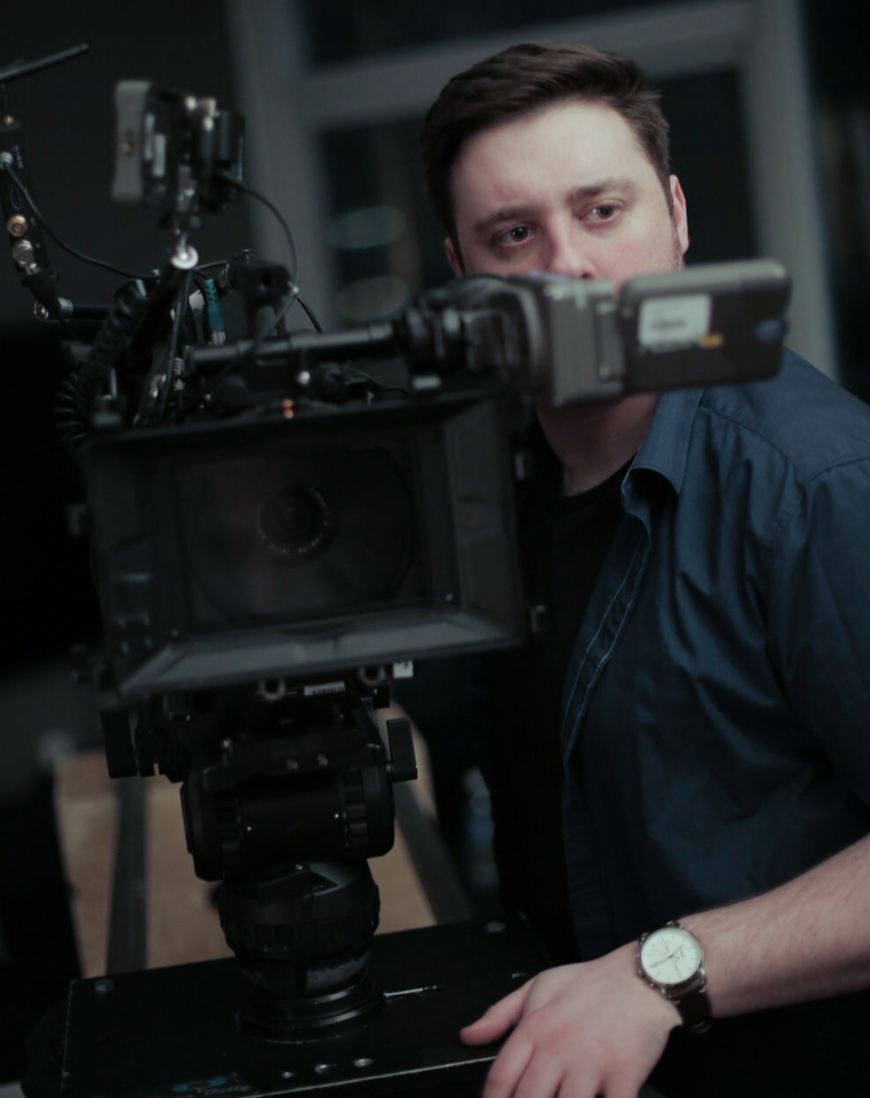
- Born: Christian Alexander Di Staulo; November 9, 1990; Etobicoke, Ontario, Canada
- Died: October 16, 2025 (aged 34); Toronto, Ontario, Canada
- Education: York University (B.A. Spec. Hons.); University of Windsor (B.Ed.)
- Alma mater: Vanier College at York University
- Occupation: Filmmaker
- Years active: 2008–2025
- Notable work: Somnolence; Dirty Talk
- Relatives: José Greco (cousin)

Christian Alexander Di Staulo (November 9, 1990 – October 16, 2025) was an Italian-Canadian filmmaker based in Toronto. His films include those with elements of dark comedy, magic realism, dreams and psychological drama. His works have been selected for the Cannes International Film Festival, Canada International Film Festival, Las Vegas Film Festival and National Screen Institute. Di Staulo's films have been acquired and broadcast globally by Amazon Prime Video and DirecTV; and on networks including CBC Television and ShortsTV.

== Early life and education ==
Di Staulo was born in Etobicoke, Ontario, on November 9, 1990.

In his teen years, he was a drama major at Etobicoke School of the Arts. Di Staulo attended York University and received a Bachelor of Arts degree (Specialized Honours).

Di Staulo completed a Bachelor of Education at the University of Windsor. He was certified to teach Drama and English in Ontario. He coached screen actors, and was a member of the Association of Acting Coaches and Educators.

He was posthumously awarded his Master of Fine Arts in Film and Media Arts by the University of Windsor in June 2026.

== Career ==
In 2013, Di Staulo directed the short psychological drama Somnolence; George Porter lives in a world where humans have evolved beyond sleep and as a result no longer dream, but he is somehow haunted by dreams of his sister. Di Staulo was one of only a few Canadians selected to showcase their work at the Cannes International Film Festival in 2014. CBC commented on how the Canadian representation at Cannes in 2014 was "an incredible vindication of our film culture." Somnolence won Best Cinematography and Best Special Effects in a Short Film at the Hollywood & Vine Film Festival in Los Angeles; Award of Excellence at the Best Shorts Competition in San Diego, Accolade Global Film Competition, and IndieFEST Film Awards; a Gold Award at the Aurora Awards; and a nomination for Best Original Score (scored by Nicolas Techer) at both the Hollywood Music in the Media Festival and the Utah Music Awards.

Di Staulo created a variety of short films, including his most popular short, Dirty Talk. The film stars Jeremy Ferdman and Katie Strain. On February 14, 2015, Dirty Talk aired on CBC to celebrate the success of Canadian filmmakers for the program Canadian Reflections on CBC Television. This film received an Award of Excellence from the Canadian Film Festival and was an Official Selection at the Las Vegas Film Festival in 2014.

== Death ==
Di Staulo died on October 16, 2025, at the age of 34.

== Filmography ==
Film	Director	Producer	Writer	Notes
Bold Accusations	Yes	Yes	No	Television film
Jules	Yes	Yes	No	Television film
Say Goodbye	Yes	Yes	No	Television film
Naughty Neighbours	Yes	Yes	Yes	Television film
O(A)R	Yes	Yes	No	Television film
Lovers to Strangers	Yes	Yes	Yes	Television film
Love for Hire	Yes	No	No	Television film
The Roots of Men	Yes	No	No	Television film
Dark Spaces	Yes	Yes	Yes	Television film
Etobicoke Stories	Yes	Yes	Yes	Television film
Somnolence	Yes	Yes	No	Television film
Eat, Prey, Love	Yes	No	No	Television film
Canadian Reflections	Yes	Yes	Yes	Television film
Dirty Talk	Yes	Yes	Yes	Television film
The Shadow in Red	Yes	Yes	No	Television film

Selected music videos

- "Love You Right" - Walk off the Earth ft. Lukas Graham
- "A Few Good Stories" - Brett Kissel ft. Walk off the Earth
- "LIKE2LIKE" - Gabriela Bee of The Bee Family
- "Words" - Brianna Corona
