= Bad Habit (album) =

Studio album by Alee
- Released: April 21, 2017
- Recorded: 2014–2017
- Genre: Country pop
- Length: 29:46
- Labels: Wax; Universal
- Producers: Dan Swinimer; Jeff Dalziel

Alee chronology
Say Hello to Goodbye (2015)	Bad Habit (2017)	Feels Like This (2021)

Singles from Bad Habit
- 1. "Only the Strong Survive" Released: October 14, 2014; 2. "Moonshine" Released: April 21, 2015; 3. "Are You Alone" Released: August 1, 2016; 4. "When I Do" Released: January 27, 2017; 5. "Bad Habit" Released: June 16, 2017

Bad Habit is the second studio album recorded by Canadian singer and songwriter Alee and first to be distributed by a record label. It was released April 21, 2017 through Wax Records and Universal Music Canada. The album includes the top 50 single, "When I Do", as well as three singles previously released from Alee's 2015 EP, Say Hello to Goodbye. Alee co-wrote all nine tracks.

== Singles ==
"Only the Strong Survive" was released as the lead single from both Bad Habit and Say Hello to Goodbye on October 14, 2014. It reached 32 on the Canada Country airplay chart.

A second single, "Moonshine", was released April 21, 2015. It received generally positive reviews from critics. The song became Alee's first top 20 hit on the Canadian country chart.

"Are You Alone" was initially released to radio August 1, 2016 as the fourth single from Say Hello to Goodbye; it also serves as the third single from Bad Habit.

"When I Do" was released January 27, 2017 as the record's fourth single. It is the album's first single not previously released on the preceding EP. The music video for "When I Do" premiered April 5, 2017 accompanying the announcement of the album's title and release date. The song entered the Canada Country chart at number 50 in April 2017.

The title track, "Bad Habit", was released June 16, 2017 as the fifth radio single.

== Track listing ==
No.	Title	Writer(s)	Producer(s)	Length
1.	"Turn This Night On"	Alexandra "Alee" Adamoski; David Thomson; Phil Barton	Dan Swinimer	3:23
2.	"Bad Habit"	A. Adamoski; Lauren Adamoski; Dan Swinimer; Tavish Crowe	Swinimer	3:10
3.	"Don't Wait"	A. Adamoski; Barton; Adam Argyle	Swinimer	2:45
4.	"When I Do"	A. Adamoski; L. Adamoski; Brian Donkers	Swinimer	3:25
5.	"Deal with It"	A. Adamoski; Barton; Bruce Wallace	Swinimer	3:06
6.	"Moonshine"	A. Adamoski; Alyssa Reid; Andrew Hyatt; Jamie Appleby	Jeff Dalziel	3:54
7.	"Are You Alone"	A. Adamoski; Dakota Jay; William King	Dalziel	3:45
8.	"Only the Strong Survive"	A. Adamoski; Emma-Lee; Karen Kosowski	Dalziel	3:10
9.	"Encore"	A. Adamoski; Jay; King	Swinimer	3:08
Total length:				29:46

== Chart performance ==
=== Singles ===
Year	Single	Peak positions
Year	Single	CAN Country
2014	"Only the Strong Survive"	32
2015	"Moonshine"	20
2016	"Are You Alone"	—
2017	"When I Do"	46
2017	"Bad Habit"	—
"—" denotes a recording that failed to chart.
