= Never Have I Ever =

"Never have I ever" is a drinking game in which players take turns asking other players about things they have not done.

Never Have I Ever may refer to:

- Never Have I Ever (TV series), an American comedy-drama TV series
- "Never Have I Ever", a 2020 song by Danielle Bradbery
- "Never Have I Ever", a 2023 song by Brett Kissel from The Compass Project
