= Hunting What We Already Killed =

Studio album by Dev Lemons
- Released: October 2, 2026
- Genre: Alternative rock
- Length: 36:18
- Label: ONErpm
- Producer: Emmett Kai

Dev Lemons chronology
Surface Tension (2025)	Hunting What We Already Killed (2026)

Singles from Hunting What We Already Killed
- 1. "Eat the Pavement" Released: June 26, 2026; 2. "Only One Way to Know" Released: July 31, 2026; 3. "Best Friend" Released: September 4, 2026

Hunting What We Already Killed is the second studio album by the American musician Dev Lemons. It was released on October 2, 2026, through ONErpm. It was preceded by the singles "Eat the Pavement", "Only One Way to Know", and "Best Friend".

In support of the album, Lemons is currently on the Eat the Pavement Tour in North America from October to November 2026.

== Background and reception ==
Dev Lemons released her debut studio album, Surface Tension, in 2025. She released the songs "Maybe I'm the Reason" and "Be Cool" as a two-track single in February 2026. On June 26, she released the single "Eat the Pavement", and announced her that her second studio album, Hunting What We Already Killed, would be released on October 2. Anthony Fantano of The Needle Drop compared the song to 1990s alternative rock and shoegaze, and praised its production and Lemons' vocals. On July 31, "Only One Way to Know" was released as the album's second single. The album's third single, "Best Friend", was released on September 4. Parker Jones of Melodic Magazine highlighted the song's "lush guitar instrumentation that evolves into electronically distorted rock".

Jess Arcand of The Line of Best Fit highlighted "emotional ups and downs" on Hunting What We Already Killed, and felt that Lemons successfully brought in more elements of alternative rock on the album without losing her signature sound. Phoenix Haigis of The Daily Texan described the album as a "familiar journey of falling in and out of love in this generation", and praised its "fearless" and "over the top" lyrics as well as its overall production and mixing.

== Track listing ==
All tracks written by Dev Lemons and Emmett Kai, and produced by Emmett Kai.

Hunting What We Already Killed track listing
No.	Title	Length
1.	"Only One Way to Know"	2:46
2.	"In the Middle of the Night"	3:36
3.	"Let You"	4:03
4.	"Eat the Pavement"	3:44
5.	"Pace"	3:36
6.	"Easy for You"	3:01
7.	"I Never Wanted to Hurt U" (Interlude)	1:35
8.	"Best Friend"	3:26
9.	"What Happened to You"	3:29
10.	"Another Word You Say"	4:07
11.	"Ice the Bruise"	2:55
Total length:		36:18

=== Notes ===
- All tracks are stylized in lowercase.
