= Klaiber =

Klaiber is a surname of German origin. Notable people with the surname include:

- Jeff Klaiber (born 1962), American speed skater
- Reese Klaiber, Canadian country music artist
- Sean Klaiber (born 1994), Dutch footballer
- Walter Klaiber (born 1940), German theologian and bishop of the Evangelical Methodist Church
