= Marc Rogers =

- Origin: Canada
- Genres: Jazz
- Occupation: Guitarist
- Instrument: Bass guitar

Marc Rogers is a Canadian acoustic and electric bassist.

== Career ==
Rogers studied at the University of North Texas College of Music, where he was a member of the One O'Clock Lab Band directed by Neil Slater.

He is a member of the band The Philosopher Kings. Rogers tours with and is a member of Michael Kaeshammer's band. He has recorded and written music for film and television including Zoe Busiek: Wild Card, the L Word, Lie With Me, and Saint Ralph.

In 1999, Rogers was the bassist for the band Laszlo which featured Norah Jones as the lead singer.

In 2005, he was in a jazz ensemble with Robi Botos, Phil Dwyer, and Terri Lyne Carrington. They were nominated for a Juno Award in the category Contemporary Jazz Album of the Year for the recording Onetake: Volume Two.

Rogers is a contributing columnist for Canadian Musician magazine.

== Personal life ==
Rogers is married to singer/songwriter Karen Kosowski.

== Selected discography ==
Solo

- Marc Rogers – Lunasa (2003)

With Jarvis Church

- Jarvis Church & The Soul Station – Vol. 1 (2012)

With Shawn Hook

- Cosmonaut and the Girl (2012)

With Michael Kaeshammer

- KaeshammerLive! (2012)
- KAESHAMMER (2011)
- Lovelight (2009)

With Emma-Lee

- Backseat Heroine (2012)

With Sarah Harmer

- Oh Little Fire (2010)

With Nelly Furtado

- Mi Plan (2009)

With Mark McLean

- Playground (2010)

With Anjulie

- Anjulie (2009)

With Kelly Jefferson Quartet

- Next Exit (2010)
- Spark (2005)

With Stereos

- Throw Ya Hands Up (Single)(2009)
- Summer Girl (Single)(2009)

With Justin Hines

- Chasing Silver (2009)

With Kreesha Turner

- Passion (2008)

With Serena Ryder

- Calling To Say (Single)(2007)

With The Philosopher Kings

- Castles (2006)

With Theo Tams

- Sing (Single)(2008)

With Fefe Dobson

- Joy (2010)

With K'naan

- The Dusty Foot Philosopher (2005)

With Peter Katz

- More Nights (2007)

With Amanda Stott

- Chasing the Sky (2005)

With Sophie Milman

- Sophie Milman (2004)

With Emilie-Claire Barlow

- Like a Lover (2005)

With Layah Jane

- Grievance and Gratitude (2005)

With Emma Roberts

- Grievance and Gratitude (2005)

With Matt Dusk

- Peace on Earth (2004)

With The Good Lovelies

- Let The Rain Fall (2005)

With Emblem3

- Nothing to Lose (2005)

With Kate Ceberano

- Kensal Road (2013)

With Barbra Lica

- That's What I Do (2012)
