= A Few Good Stories =

2020 Brett Kissel song

Single by Brett Kissel

from the album Now or Never
- Released: September 11, 2020
- Genre: Country
- Length: 2:45 (album version): 2:43 (Walk off the Earth version)
- Label: Warner Canada; BAK 2 BAK
- Songwriters: Ben Hayslip; Chris Stevens; Rhett Akins
- Producers: Brett Kissel; Jacob Durrett

Brett Kissel singles chronology
"She Drives Me Crazy" (2020)	"A Few Good Stories" (2020)	"Make a Life, Not a Living" (2021)

Music video
- "A Few Good Stories" on YouTube

"A Few Good Stories" (with Walk off the Earth)
- Cover for collaboration version

"A Few Good Stories" is a song recorded by Canadian country artist Brett Kissel. The track was co-written by Ben Hayslip, Chris Stevens, and Rhett Akins. A second version of the track with Canadian indie pop band Walk off the Earth was released in November 2020.

In 2024, Kenny Chesney released a cover of the song on his album Born under the title "Few Good Stories".

== Music video ==
The official music video for "A Few Good Stories" with Walk Off the Earth premiered on November 6, 2020, and was directed by Chris Di Staulo. The video features Kissel, members of Walk off the Earth, Edmonton Oilers star Connor McDavid, as well as Kissel's dog Charlie, McDavid's dog Lenny, and television personalities Kaitlyn Bristowe and Jason Tartick's dogs Ramen and Pinot.

== Commercial performance ==
"A Few Good Stories" reached a peak of Number One on the Billboard Canada Country chart dated January 23, 2021. It marks Kissel's third Number One hit on the chart after "Airwaves" and "Drink About Me". It also peaked at number 62 on the Billboard Canadian Hot 100, and was certified Gold by Music Canada.

== Charts ==
Chart (2020–2021)	Peak position
Canada Hot 100 (Billboard)	62
Canada Country (Billboard)	1

== Certifications ==
Region	Certification	Certified units/sales
Canada (Music Canada)	Gold	40,000^{‡}
^{‡} Sales+streaming figures based on certification alone.
