= Never Just a Dream =

- Emma-Lee's debut album, Never Just a Dream

Studio album by Emma-Lee
- Released: 2008
- Genres: Pop, jazz, folk
- Label: Bumstead Productions
- Producers: Mitch Girio; Emma-Lee

Emma-Lee chronology
Never Just a Dream	Backseat Heroine

Never Just a Dream is Emma-Lee's debut full-length album. Initially, it was self-released in the late summer of 2008 and it instantly caught the attention of key industry professionals, including artist development executive David "Click" Cox. Emma-Lee and David Cox signed a co-management deal and re-released Never Just A Dream through Bumstead Productions, with distribution by Universal Music in 2009. The album Co-produced by Mitch Girio and Emma-Lee.

The first review of this album was a four out of four rating from The Toronto Star. Shortly after it was awarded 3.5/4 stars by The Globe and Mail and was the 'disc of the week'. As described by NOW magazine, "Never Just A Dream combines laid-back jazz flavours and concise pop structures. Country references drop in here and there, as do some flavours borrowed from 60s girl groups." As AW Music observes, "there is a focus on the instrumentation associated with these influences, so reminiscent of the classical lounge sounds back in the days."

== Theme ==
""Never Just a Dream"" explores all things romantic – jealousy, rebounding, May–December pairings.

== Album artwork ==
When Emma-Lee designed the artwork for Never Just a Dream, she was inspired by a photo of a red velvet frame. In addition to being eye-catching she liked the idea that it visually captured the acoustic quality of her warm "velvety" voice. The quality of "red velvet cupcake" became an original way to describe that "the album carries a certain sweetness to it".

== Track list ==
1. Bruise Easy
2. That Sinking Feeling 4:05
3. Never Just A Dream 4:51
4. Jealousy 2:14
5. Flow 6:08
6. Isn't It Obvious 5:09
7. Mr. Buttonlip 4:49
8. An Older Man 5:15
9. Where You Want To Be 4:12
10. Until We Meet Again 3:16
