= This Road Goes Everywhere =

Studio album by Alee
- Released: July 18, 2013
- Recorded: MCC Studios in Calgary, Alberta
- Genre: Country
- Length: 41:12
- Label: Gotta Be Alee
- Producer: Johnny "Six Pack" Gasparic

Alee chronology
This Road Goes Everywhere (2013)	Say Hello to Goodbye (EP) (2015)

Singles from This Road Goes Everywhere
- 1. "Real" Released: February 1, 2012; 2. "What're We Waitin' For?" Released: August 27, 2012; 3. "Don't Say You Love Me" Released: January 8, 2013; 4. "Crazy" Released: July 1, 2013

This Road Goes Everywhere is the debut studio album recorded by Canadian country singer Alee, released independently under the imprint Gotta Be Alee on July 18, 2013. The record produced four singles, two of which charted at Canadian country radio. "Don't Say You Love Me" peaked at number 25 on the Canada Country chart, a rare accomplishment for an independent artist. The album was nominated for Album of the Year at the 2013 Alberta Country Music Association (ACMA) awards.

== Background ==
Alee met Dave Temple and Johnny "Six Pack" Gasparic "a few years" before the album was released and began recording music. Gasparic was later brought on as the record's producer. All of the songs were written solely by Alee, except for one track co-written by Emma-Lee and Karen Kosowski. The album's title and pending release was announced in May 2013.

== Singles ==
Alee's debut single, "Real", was released February 1, 2012. "What're We Waitin' For?" was released as the follow-up on August 27, 2012. A third single, "Don't Say You Love Me" was released January 8, 2013. This was her first single to impact the Canada Country chart and her first to hit the top 25. It was also named the "fastest moving indie country single" of 2013. "Crazy" was released July 1, 2013 as the album's fourth and final single. It reached 32 on the Canada Country chart.

== Track listing ==
All tracks are written by Alexandra "Alee" Adamoski, except "One More Light", written by Adamoski, Emma-Lee, and Karen Kosowski

No.	Title	Length
1.	"Real"	4:11
2.	"Don't Say You Love Me"	4:16
3.	"What're We Waitin' For"	3:35
4.	"Friday Night"	2:52
5.	"Trucks"	3:37
6.	"Crazy"	4:06
7.	"I've Got You"	3:39
8.	"One More Light"	4:14
9.	"Real" (radio edit)	3:50
10.	"Don't Say You Love Me" (radio edit)	3:38
11.	"Crazy" (radio edit)	3:14
Total length:		41:12

== Chart performance ==
=== Singles ===
Year	Single	Peak positions
Year	Single	CAN Country
2012	"Real"	—
2012	"What're We Waitin' For?"	—
2013	"Don't Say You Love Me"	25
2013	"Crazy"	32
