= Alee (singer) =

Canadian country music singer-songwriter

- Born: Alexandra Adamoski; Edmonton, Alberta, Canada
- Genre: Country
- Occupation: Singer-songwriter
- Instruments: Guitar; mandolin; piano
- Years active: 2012–present
- Labels: Little Red Truck; Gotta Be Alee; Wax
- Website: gottabealee.com

Alexandra Adamoski, known professionally as Alee, is a Canadian country music singer-songwriter. Alee released her independent debut album, This Road Goes Everywhere, on July 18, 2013. The single "Don't Say You Love Me" reached the Top 25 on the Billboard Canada Country chart, followed by a Top 20 hit with her 2015 single "Moonshine". In August 2013, she won the Canadian Country Music Association's Jiffy Lube FanFest Performance Contest, and was later nominated for the prestigious Rising Star Award in 2016, and Female Artist of the Year in 2017. Her debut label-supported album, Bad Habit, was released in April 2017. She released her third album Feels Like This independently in 2021.

== Discography ==
=== Studio albums ===
Title	Details
This Road Goes Everywhere	Release date: July 18, 2013; Label: Alee
Bad Habit	Release date: April 21, 2017; Label: Wax, Universal
Feels Like This	Release date: July 16, 2021; Label: Alee
Love, Again	Release date: April 26, 2023; Label: Alee

=== Extended plays ===
Title	Details
Say Hello to Goodbye	Release date: July 10, 2015; Label: Wax

=== Singles ===
Year	Single	Peak positions	Album
Year	Single	CAN Country	Album
2012	"Real"	—	This Road Goes Everywhere
2012	"What're We Waitin' For?"	—	This Road Goes Everywhere
2013	"Don't Say You Love Me"	25	This Road Goes Everywhere
2013	"Crazy"	32	This Road Goes Everywhere
2014	"Only the Strong Survive"	32	Bad Habit
2015	"Moonshine"	20	Bad Habit
2015	"Say Hello to Goodbye"	—	Say Hello to Goodbye
2016	"Are You Alone"	—	Bad Habit
2017	"When I Do"	46	Bad Habit
2017	"Bad Habit"	—	Bad Habit
2018	"Don't Make Me Miss You"	38	Feels Like This
2019	"No One Like You"	33	Feels Like This
2021	"Ex-Girlfriend"	—	Feels Like This
2021	"Guys Like You"	—	Feels Like This
2022	"Boys and Girls"	—	Feels Like This
2022	"Twenty-Four"	—	TBA
2023	"Love Songs"	—	TBA
"—" denotes releases that did not chart

=== Music videos ===
Year	Video	Director
2013	"Don't Say You Love Me"	Blake McWilliam
2014	"Only the Strong Survive"	Aaron A
2015	"Moonshine"	Aaron A
2017	"When I Do"	Aaron A

== Awards ==
Year	Nominee / work	Award	Result
2013	This Road Goes Everywhere	ACMA Album of the Year	Nominated
2013	Alee	ACMA Rising Star Award	Nominated
2013	Alee	ACMA Female Artist of the Year	Won
2013	"Don't Say You Love Me"	ACMA Song of the Year	Nominated
2013	"Don't Say You Love Me"	Canadian Country Music Awards Songwriter of the Year (second ballot)	Nominated
2013	Alee	Canadian Country Music Awards Rising Star Award (second ballot)	Nominated
2013	Alee	Canadian Country Music Awards Female Artist of the Year (second ballot)	Nominated
2014	Alee	ACMA Female Artist of the Year	Won
2014	Alee	Canadian Radio Music Awards Best New Group or Solo Artist: Country	Nominated
2016	Alee	Canadian Country Music Awards: Rising Star	Nominated
2017	Alee	Canadian Country Music Awards: Female Artist of the Year	Nominated
2017	Alee	Alberta Country Music Awards: Female Artist of the Year	Won
2017	Alee	Alberta Country Music Awards: Album of the Year (Bad Habit)	Won
2017	Alee	Alberta Country Music Awards: Single of the Year (When I Do)	Nominated
2017	Alee	Alberta Country Music Awards: Song of the Year (When I Do)	Nominated
2017	Alee	Alberta Country Music Awards: Video of the Year (When I Do)	Nominated
2022	Alee	Canadian Country Music Awards: Creative Director of the Year (Feels Like This)	Nominated
