= Let Your Horses Run – The Album =

2025 album by Brett Kissel

Studio album by Brett Kissel
- Released: February 28, 2025
- Genre: Country
- Length: 34:23; 53:33 (Deluxe)
- Label: Big Star
- Producer: Mickey Jack Cones; Jesse Frasure; Bart McKay; Seth Mosley; Michael O'Connor; Case Wood

Brett Kissel chronology
The Compass Project (2023)	Let Your Horses Run – The Album (2025)

Singles from Let Your Horses Run – The Album
- 1. "Two of Us" Released: September 15, 2023; 2. "Let Your Horses Run" Released: May 3, 2024; 3. "Another One" Released: September 13, 2024; 4. "Cowboys & Dreamers" Released: May 4, 2025; 5. "Hurtin' Songs" Released: September 24, 2025

Let Your Horses Run – The Album is the fourteenth studio album by Canadian country music artist Brett Kissel. It was primarily produced by Mickey Jack Cones and Bart McKay, and released on February 28, 2025, via Big Star Recordings. The album includes the singles "Two of Us", "Let Your Horses Run", "Another One", "Cowboys & Dreamers", and "Hurtin' Songs". It was nominated for Album of the Year at the 2025 Canadian Country Music Association Awards.

== Background and promotion ==
Kissel remarked that on this album, he wanted to dive into his "Western roots and heritage," and that he took inspiration from his upbringing on a farm in northern Alberta and his current life after buying his grandparents' farm. Kissel supported the album with his acoustic "The Side You've Never Seen Tour" across Canada in early 2025.

== Critical reception ==
James Daykin of Entertainment Focus reviewed the album and gave it 4.5 out of 5 stars. He described it as a "bold step into the heart of Western country music" and "a cohesive and evocative album that blends classic storytelling with modern sensibilities", while opining that it is one of the "most compelling releases" of Kissel's career.

== Track listing ==
Let Your Horses Run – The Album
No.	Title	Writer(s)	Length
1.	"Cowboys & Dreamers"	Jim Beavers; Brice Long; Lindsay Rimes	3:09
2.	"Let Your Horses Run"	Jesse Frasure; Brett Kissel	3:04
3.	"Get the Hell Out of This Town" (with Don Louis)	Devin Dawson; Austin Taylor Smith; Ben Stennis; Mark Trussell	3:00
4.	"Another One"	Kissel; Andy Albert; Seth Mosley; Matt Rogers	3:30
5.	"Nowhere to Ride"	Reese Klaiber	3:28
6.	"Two of Us" (with Cooper Alan)	Kissel; Mosley; Cooper Alan; Matt McKinney	3:15
7.	"Hurtin' Songs"	Long; Marv Green; J.T. Harding	3:04
8.	"Rich Is" (with Phil Vassar)	Kissel; Brett Sheroky; Phil Vassar	3:11
9.	"Close to You"	Kissel; Kyle Clark; Deric Ruttan	3:19
10.	"All This Cowboy Needs" (with Morgan Klaiber)	Kissel; Morgan Klaiber	5:08
Total length:			34:21

Deluxe Edition
No.	Title	Writer(s)	Length
11.	"Heart to Forget"	Casey Brown; Isley Juber; Parker Welling	3:23
12.	"Hurtin' Songs" (with Dierks Bentley)	Long; Green; Harding	3:04
13.	"Let Your Horses Run" (Mezcal Club Mix)	Kissel; Frasure	2:56
14.	"Let Your Horses Run" (Acoustic Mix)	Kissel; Frasure	2:58
15.	"Two of Us" (Margarita Mix) (with Cooper Alan)	Kissel; Mosley; Alan; McKinney	3:15
16.	"Another One" (Neat Mix)	Kissel; Albert; Mosley; Rogers	3:32
Total length:			53:33

== Personnel ==
Credits adapted from AllMusic.

- Cooper Alan – primary vocals
- Mickey Jack Cones – acoustic guitar, background vocals, electric guitar, keyboards, mixing engineer, production, program engineering, synthesizer, vocal editing, vocal production
- Spencer Cheyne – drum set, vocal production
- Eddy Dunlap – slide guitar
- Jesse Frasure – production
- Jonny Fung – acoustic guitar, banjo, bass, electric guitar, guitar, mandolin, slide guitar
- Georgetown – mastering engineer
- Evan Hutchings – drum set
- Mike Johnson – slide guitar
- Brennan Kennedy – track engineer
- Jeff King – electric guitar
- Morgan Klaiber – background vocals, primary vocals
- Gideon Klein – dobro
- Brett Kissel – acoustic guitar, primary vocals
- Justin Kudding – background vocals, bass guitar, vocal production
- Zach Kuhlman – assistant production, assistant tracking engineer
- Troy Lancaster – electric guitar
- Todd Lombardo – acoustic guitar, bass
- Don Louis – primary vocals
- Bart McKay – accordion, Hammond B3, mixing engineer, piano, production, program engineering, vocal production, Wurlitzer piano
- Spencer McKay – drum set, assistant engineering
- Miles McPherson – drum set
- Andrew Mendleson – master engineering
- Seth Mosley – background vocals, co-production, bass guitar, electric guitar, guitar, keyboards, organ, production
- Carl Miner – acoustic guitar
- Crystal O'Connor – digital editing, keyboards, vocal mixing
- Mike "X." O'Connor – co-production, mixing engineer, production
- Michael Rinne – bass, bass guitar
- Mark Troyer – engineering
- Phil Vassar – primary vocals
- Troy Volrath – fiddle, mandolin
- Jimmy Wallace – keyboards
- Case Wood – production, track engineering

== Charts ==
=== Singles ===
Title	Year	Peak chart positions		Certifications
Title	Year	CAN	CAN Country	Certifications
"Two of Us" (with Cooper Alan)	2023	— (Note: "Two of Us" did not enter the Billboard Canadian Hot 100, but peaked at number 9 on the Canadian Digital Song Sales component chart.)	6	
"Let Your Horses Run"	2024	89	4	MC: Gold
"Another One"	2024	—	7	
"Cowboys & Dreamers"	2025	98	4	
"Hurtin' Songs" (with Dierks Bentley)	2025	—	35	
"—" denotes releases that did not chart

== Accolades ==
Year	Association	Category	Nominated work	Result	Ref
2024	Canadian Country Music Association	Musical Collaboration of the Year	"Two of Us"	Nominated	
2024	Canadian Country Music Association	Video of the Year	"Two of Us"	Nominated	
2025	Canadian Country Music Association	Album of the Year	Let Your Horses Run – The Album	Nominated	
2025	Canadian Country Music Association	Single of the Year	"Let Your Horses Run"	Nominated	
2025	Canadian Country Music Association	Video of the Year	"Let Your Horses Run"	Nominated	

== Release history ==
Release formats for Let Your Horses Run – The Album
Country	Date	Format	Label	Ref.
Various	February 28, 2025	Digital download	Big Star Recordings	
Various	February 28, 2025	Streaming	Big Star Recordings	

Release formats for Let Your Horses Run – The Album (Deluxe Edition)
Country	Date	Format	Label	Ref.
Various	September 26, 2025	Digital download	Big Star Recordings	
Various	September 26, 2025	Streaming	Big Star Recordings	
