= Dev Lemons =

American singer-songwriter and record producer (born 1999)

- Dev Lemons performing in 2026

Background information
- Born: Devon Vonder Schmalz; March 12, 1999 (age 27); Warrington Township, Pennsylvania, U.S.
- Education: Emerson College
- Genres: Alternative pop; alternative rock
- Years active: 2020–present
- Label: ONErpm
- Website: devlemons.org

Devon Vonder Schmalz (born March 12, 1999), also known as Dev Lemons, is an American singer-songwriter, record producer, and YouTuber. She initially gained popularity by making music theory videos as SongPsych on TikTok and YouTube and through her personal YouTube channel, Dev Limes. She has released two studio albums, Surface Tension in 2025, and Hunting What We Already Killed in 2026.

== Early life ==
Devon Vonder Schmalz was born on March 12, 1999, in Warrington Township, Bucks County, Pennsylvania. She played the flute in the fourth grade but had to quit because it was too expensive; she also attempted piano and electric guitar, but dropped those as well.

Initially aspiring to be an actress, Schmalz majored in TV Writing at Emerson College, but had to finish her senior year online due to the COVID-19 pandemic. Later, she interned at Nickelodeon and Comedy Central and, until 2023, produced digestible videos on music theory, which she learned about online during the pandemic, as SongPsych on TikTok and YouTube. She also operated a YouTube channel, Dev Limes, where she became known for a series in which she attempted to recreate popular songs from scratch while keeping her computer muted, leaving her unable to hear the music she was producing. The series later led to her third EP, Songs with the Volume On, which incorporated elements from songs she had created during the series.

== Career ==
Schmalz originally started out making bedroom pop solo as Miss iPad, but rebranded in fear of Apple Inc. suing her if she became more successful. She also formed the comedy music group Queef Jerky with YouTuber, and then-partner, Nickisnotgreen.

Schmalz released her debut studio album, Surface Tension, on August 1, 2025. In the leadup to the album's release, she created "scary short films" that were uploaded to social media; these videos were influenced by the older internet era, the uncanny valley aesthetic, and games such as Doki Doki Literature Club!. She released her second album, Hunting What We Already Killed, on October 2, 2026. She wrote the album over a year and a half prior and drew from personal experiences, including the ending of a relationship.

== Influences and artistry ==
Schmalz has stated that, when making music, she likes to "turn [her] brain off as much as [she] can" to help expose her subconscious to the music. Many of her songs develop based on her feelings on the day. On the visualizer for "Eat the Pavement" off her album Hunting What We Already Killed, Schmalz wanted to draw comparisons to Happy Tree Friends, contrasting its buoyant production with firm lyrics.

== Discography ==
=== Studio albums ===
Title	Details
Surface Tension	Released: August 1, 2025; Label: Self-released; Formats: LP, CD, digital download
Hunting What We Already Killed	Released: October 2, 2026; Label: ONErpm; Formats: LP, CD, digital download

=== Extended plays ===
Title	Details
Lemontopia	Released: April 16, 2021; Label: Self-released; Formats: Digital download
Delusional	Released: May 26, 2023; Label: Self-released; Formats: Digital download
Songs With the Volume On	Released: December 6, 2024; Label: Self-released; Formats: Digital download

=== Singles ===
Title	Year	Album
"Rotisserie Pigeon" (with Stevie Powers)	2020	Non-album singles
"Guessing Games" (with Whose Rules)	2021	Non-album singles
"Don't You See the Time" (with Whose Rules)	2021	Non-album singles
"One Whole Me"	2022	Non-album singles
"Autopilot"	2022	Non-album singles
"CEO of My Ass"	2022	Non-album singles
"Ghosted My Dentist"	2022	Non-album singles
"Nightstand"	2023	Delusional
"Dizzy Vision"	2023	Delusional
"You Tear Me Apart"	2023	Delusional
"Give Mama a Hug"	2024	Non-album singles
"Freak Show"	2024	Non-album singles
"Why Did I Laugh Anyway"	2024	Non-album singles
"In The Party" (with Billy Lemos)	2024	Non-album singles
"Nice Try"	2025	Surface Tension
"Stuck Again"	2025	Surface Tension
"Maybe I'm the Reason / Be Cool"	2026	Non-album singles
"Eat the Pavement"	2026	Hunting What We Already Killed
"Only One Way to Know"	2026	Hunting What We Already Killed
"Best Friend"	2026	Hunting What We Already Killed

=== Songs as a featured artist ===
Title	Year	Album
"Keep in Touch" (with Nxtime)	2021	Non-album singles
"Oh Yeah" (with Ark Woods)	2022	Non-album singles
"System Failure" (with Abbatia)	2022	Red Room
"Soon You're Gonna Know" (with Kinneret)	2023	All That I Know
"Lemons" (with Glitch Gum)	2023	SPRINKLES! (Deluxe)
"All My Fault [Reworked]" (with Johan Lenox)	2025	I Guess We'll Find Out [Reworked]

=== As Miss Ipad ===
Title	Year	Release
"Bluetooth"	2018	Extended Play
"Party People Only"	2018	Extended Play
"Hear Ye!"	2018	Extended Play
"Come Back Tonight"	2019	Single
"Break"	2019	Extended Play
"All I Can Say"	2019	Single
"You Don't Care About People"	2019	Single
"The Sun or the Rain"	2020	Single
"Blue Beanie"	2020	Single
"My Stuff"	2025	Extended Play
"Listen"	2025	Single
"Mountains (Way to Go)"	2025	Single

Notes:

- The Sun or the Rain released under Miss Ipad is an alternate version of the song released under Dev Lemons in the EP Lemontopia, with an alternate instrumental and added vocals.

== Tours ==
- Freak Show Tour (2023)
- Surface Tension Tour (2026)
- Eat The Pavement Tour (2026)
