= Backseat Heroine =

Studio album by Emma-Lee
- Released: February 7, 2012
- Genre: Pop / Rock / Americana / Soul
- Producers: Marc Rogers; Karen Kosowski; Emma-Lee

Emma-Lee chronology
Never Just a Dream (2008)	Backseat Heroine (2012)

Backseat Heroine is Emma-Lee's second album, released February 7, 2012. Produced by Marc Rogers, Karen Kosowski and Emma-Lee, and released on the Special Agent label, under exclusive license to eOne Music Canada.

== Description ==
The voice and the songs are certainly the driving force behind Backseat Heroine, at its core it's held together by the love and passion of the musicians around her. The cover art of Backseat Heroine, a painting of Emma-Lee, was done by Michael Michael Motorcycle, a painter and illustrator, to reflect a "70s, psychedelic vibe". The inspiration for the album's title is derived from the Bobbie Gentry song "Girl from Cincinnati." The album is dedicated to Emma-Lee's father who died before the album was officially released.

== Instrumentation ==
- Emma-Lee - Lead Vocals, Acoustic Guitar, Tambourine
- Devrim Eldeleki - electric guitar, 12 string guitar, acoustic guitar, background vocals (track 8)
- Mark McIntyre - Bass, Background vocals (track 8)
- Marc Rogers - Bass & Backup Vocals
- Karen Kosowski - piano, wurlitzer, rhodes, Background vocals (tracks 1, 2, 5, 6, 8)
- Denis Keldie - B3 organ, Lowry Organ
- Marc Rogers - Background vocals (track 8), horn arrangements (track 5), shaker (track 6)
- Mike Olson - string arrangements, cello
- Kevin Mendes - Drums, Shaker, congas, Background Vocals (track 8)
- Rebecca Hennessy - Trumpet, flugelhorn, horn arrangements (track 1)
- Christine Bougie - lap steel
- Luke Doucet - vocals (track 7)
- Lance Doty - Mandolin (track 8)
- Matt McKenna & James Bloemendal - background vocals (track 9)
- Shelly Hayes, Layah Jane, Lee Wakeline - background vocals (track 6 & 8)
- Melissa Bathory - background vocals (track 1)
- Karen Moffat - viola
- Peter Seminovs - Violin
- Jenny Thompson - Violin

== Tracks ==
1. Not Coming By (4:32)

Words & Music by Emma-Lee
Video directed by Josh Warburton

2. Backseat Heroine (4:52)

Words & Music by Emma-Lee & Nicole Atkins

3. I'll Dream For You (3:41)

Words & Music by Emma-Lee

4. Just Looking (2:56)

Words & Music by Emma-Lee

5. Phoenix (3:56)

Words & Music by Emma-Lee

6. Figure it Out (3:16)

Words & Music by Emma-Lee & Karen Kosowski
Video Directed, Edited, & Shot By Gavin Michael Booth

7. Today's Another Yesterday (5:03)

Words & Music by Emma-Lee & Luke Doucet

8. Bring Back Your Love (4:43)

Words & Music by Emma-Lee

9. The Pool of Tears (3:57)

Words & Music by Emma-Lee

10. Shadow of a Ghost

Words & Music by Emma-Lee & Karen Kosowski (SOCAN) © 2010

11. I Could Live With Dying Tonight

Words & Music by Emma-Lee & Jill Barber

== Backseat Sessions ==
Jessica Denomme describes the Backseat Sessions as a, "series of video-documentaries that followed her [Emma-Lee's] hitch-hiking expeditions around the Greater Toronto Area and performing to random motorist in exchange for a lift". During Canadian Music Fest in 2012, Emma-Lee rented a SUV limousine to serenade industry professionals. The results of the backseat sessions were posted online and can be viewed on Emma-Lee's YouTube Channel video.

== Track by Track Tuesdays ==
In anticipation of the release of Backseat Heroine, Emma-Lee released a weekly “Track by Track” interview every Tuesday leading up to the release of Backseat Heroine. The videos featured Karen Karen Kosowski, Marc Rogers, Emma-Lee and her bandmates. In each video the band discusses the making of a different track from the record Backseat Heroine with Rich Terfry at The Chalet.

== Video contest ==
In April 2012, Emma-Lee announced a video contest for her new single “Figure It Out” inviting aspiring singers and bands to submit their own versions of her song either in a karaoke style or by completely revamping it in their own way. Prizes included a fully produced music video, an electric guitar, cash and song writing session with Emma-Lee and Karen Kosowski.
