= Ain't the Same =

2022 song by Brett Kissel and 98 Degrees

Single by Brett Kissel featuring 98 Degrees

from the album The Compass Project – South Album
- Released: April 22, 2022
- Genre: Country
- Length: 3:06
- Label: BAK 2 BAK; ONErpm
- Songwriters: Brett Kissel; Karen Kosowski; Tim Nichols
- Producer: Karen Kosowski

Brett Kissel singles chronology
"Somewhere to Drink" (2021)	"Ain't the Same" (2022)	"Watch It" (2022)

98 Degrees singles chronology
"Where Do You Wanna Go?" (2021)	"Ain't the Same" (2022)	"Got U" (2025)

Music video
- "Ain't the Same" on YouTube

"Ain't the Same" is a song recorded by Canadian country artist Brett Kissel featuring American pop vocal group 98 Degrees. Kissel wrote the song with Karen Kosowski and Tim Nichols, while Kosowski produced the track. It was the lead single off Kissel's 2023 studio album The Compass Project – South Album.

== Background ==
Kissel and his co-writers wrote the song with inspiration stemming from the idea of "how much sweeter everything is when we get to experience life's gifts with the people we cherish most". Kissel cited his relationship with his wife Cecilia as his personal inspiration. He initially did not intend for it to be a collaboration, before he laid down vocals on the demo and realized the potential of the song. Kissel's manager Jim Cressman had been friends for a long time with Jeff Timmons of 98 Degrees, and knew that the band was initially looking to make a country album so he sent them "Ain't the Same" to gauge their interest in recording it. At this point, the band had abandoned their plans for a full album, but were nonetheless interested in the song and asked Cressman if Kissel was interested in joining them on the track. Kissel immediately approved of the collaboration, and 98 Degrees recorded their parts within several days from a studio in Los Angeles.

== Critical reception ==
Bethany Bowman of the Tennessee Star stated that the song "offers a unique blend of pop and modern country, highlighting Kissel’s warm, rich vocals and paired with the infectious harmonies of 98 Degrees," adding that it was "sure to entice listeners of all genres and from all age groups". Michael Major of Broadway World described the song as a "unique blend of pop and modern country," saying it puts "a fresh, lighthearted spin on the concept of finding one's perfect match". Markos Papadatos of Digital Journal called the track an "upbeat song" with a "clever chorus that parallels the narrator’s relationship and famous pairings that just aren’t quite right when not together".

== Commercial performance ==
"Ain't the Same" peaked at number 33 on the Billboard Canada Country chart for the week of September 3, 2022, marking the lowest peak of Kissel's career to-date. It also peaked at number 31 on the Canadian Digital Song Sales for the week of May 7, 2022, after the song's initial release.

== Live performance ==
Kissel performed "Ain't the Same" live on Citytv's Breakfast Television program in Canada in June 2022. Kissel and 98 Degrees performed the song together at 2022 Canadian Country Music Awards from the Scotiabank Saddledome in Calgary, Alberta on September 11, 2022. The show was broadcast live on Global in Canada, while a video of their performance was uploaded to YouTube on September 20, 2022.

== Music video ==
The official music video for "Ain't the Same" was directed by Aaron Huisman and premiered on April 30, 2022. It features the members of 98 Degrees showing the tourist Brett Kissel around Los Angeles. At one point, Kissel uses FaceTime to speak to his wife and children, with his family later surprising him at a show in Los Angeles. Kissel remarked that he was surprised at the amount of paparazzi that was surrounding 98 Degrees at the video shoot.

== Charts ==
Chart (2022)	Peak position
Canada Country (Billboard)	33
Canada Digital Songs (Billboard)	31
