= Say Hello to Goodbye (EP) =

EP by Alee
- Released: July 10, 2015
- Recorded: Nashville, TN and Toronto, ON
- Genre: Country; country pop
- Length: 20:26
- Label: Wax
- Producer: Dave Thomson; Jeff Dalziel

Alee chronology
This Road Goes Everywhere (2013)	Say Hello to Goodbye (2015)	Bad Habit (2017)

Singles from Say Hello to Goodbye
- 1. "Only the Strong Survive" Released: October 14, 2014; 2. "Moonshine" Released: April 21, 2015; 3. "Say Hello to Goodbye" Released: October 21, 2015; 4. "Are You Alone" Released: August 1, 2016

Say Hello to Goodbye is the first extended play and debut release on a record label by Canadian singer-songwriter Alee. It was released through Wax Records on July 10, 2015. The EP has spawned four singles, including "Moonshine", which was Alee's first Top-20 hit on the Billboard Canada Country airplay chart.

== Promotion ==
Alee embarked upon a promotional radio tour in support of "Moonshine" in the spring of 2015 and followed that with a tour of summer festivals to support the EP in the summer of 2015, kicking off on Canada Day (July 1), 2015 in St. Albert, Alberta.

=== Singles ===
The EP's lead single, "Only the Strong Survive", was released October 14, 2014. It failed to enter the all-genre Billboard Canadian Hot 100, but peaked at number 32 on the magazine's Canada Country airplay chart.

"Moonshine", co-written by labelmate Alyssa Reid, was released April 21, 2015 as the EP's second official single. It has been cited as a standout track by critics. The song has reached a peak position of 20 on the Canada Country chart, a career-high peak.

"Say Hello to Goodbye" was released October 21, 2015 as the EP's third radio single. It failed to enter the country airplay chart.

A fourth single, "Are You Alone", was released to radio August 1, 2016.

== Critical reception ==
Kyle Mullin of Exclaim! rated the EP 7/10, comparing it favorably to Taylor Swift's earlier, country-inspired work. "Fans of the genre... will surely adore it," writes Mullin, "but crucially, there's something here for outsiders, too, as Alee's true talents lie not only in her ability to conform to Nashville norms, but in the way she subtly adds her own spin."

Taryn McElheran of Confront Magazine was also positive in her 4 stars out of 5 review. She praised the collection's combination of "typical country love/heartbreak songs" and more upbeat material, and wrote that it is "really hard not to enjoy her smooth, twangy tunes."

== Track listing ==
No.	Title	Writer(s)	Producer(s)	Length
1.	"Fall Too Fast"	Alexandra Adamoski; Bruce Wallace	Dave Thomson	3:18
2.	"Say Hello to Goodbye"	Adamoski; Dakota Jay; William King	Thomson	2:55
3.	"Happily Ever After (After You)"	Adamoski; Jamie Appleby; Nathan Ferraro	Thomson	3:25
4.	"Moonshine"	Adamoski; Alyssa Reid; Andrew Hyatt; Appleby	Jeff Dalziel	3:54
5.	"Are You Alone"	Adamoski; Jay; King	Dalziel	3:45
6.	"Only the Strong Survive"	Adamoski; Emma Lee; Karen Kosowski	Dalziel	3:09
Total length:				20:26

== Chart performance ==
=== Singles ===
Year	Single	Peak positions
Year	Single	CAN Country
2014	"Only the Strong Survive"	32
2015	"Moonshine"	20
2015	"Say Hello to Goodbye"	—
2016	"Are You Alone"	—
"—" denotes releases that did not chart
