= What Is Life? (album) =

Studio album by Brett Kissel
- Released: April 9, 2021
- Genre: Country
- Length: 34:45
- Label: BAK 2 BAK; Warner Canada; ONErpm
- Producer: Brett Kissel; Bart McKay; Jesse Frasure

Brett Kissel chronology
Now or Never (2020)	What Is Life? (2021)	The Compass Project (2023)

Singles from What Is Life?
- 1. "Make a Life, Not a Living" Released: March 5, 2021; 2. "Night in the Life" Released: August 13, 2021

What Is Life? is the fifth major-label studio album by Canadian country music artist Brett Kissel. It was released on April 9, 2021, through Warner Music Canada, and ONErpm in the United States. It includes the #1 Canada Country hit single "Make a Life, Not a Living", as well as "Night in the Life".

== Background ==
Kissel believes the COVID-19 pandemic changed the music industry and that music needs to "bring people together safely, tell the story, distract from the real challenges going on in the world right now". At the onset of the pandemic, Kissel felt lacking of creative spirit and did not write songs for six months. He began writing again in late 2020 and early 2021, and says that from this album forward he will spend the next few years focusing on telling a story with his music and not focusing on profit. He remarked that the song "Die to Go Home" was the "most emotional" for him as it was "super vulnerable" and a story he felt he would never share, while he called "Slidin' Your Way" an "ode" to 1990s country group Diamond Rio.

== Development ==
Kissel says this album is "not really hit driven" rather it is "heart driven". In order to make the album more important to him, he recorded some of the songs on his farm in Alberta, and took all of the photos for the album and its liner notes on the farm he grew up at. He also invited his wife and three children to be involved with the album, with each of his three children featuring on their own interlude. He described the title of the album What Is Life? as an "age-old question" that he has focused on for this phase of his career and life, saying that "each and every time, the one thought that is always front and centre for me, is doing the best we can with what we have, and making the most of our lives". Kissel opted to have his touring band play the backing instruments on the album instead of Nashville session players.

== Critical reception ==
What Is Life? received overwhelmingly positive reviews upon release, with many noting the real-world emotions and feelings in the songs. Markos Papadatos of Digital Journal gave the album an "A rating", saying "there is a lot of variety in this musical effort, and every track has its own identity". Hannah Rastrick of Complete Country called the album "incredible", "genuine", and "inspiring", adding that "it came at the perfect time for a lot of people looking for direction". Pip Ellwood-Hughes of Entertainment Focus referred to What is Life? as a "timely record that is sure to resonate with everyone", noting Kissel's "honest approach" and calling it his "best work to date". Erica Zisman of NY Country Swag stated that the album is a "powerful project that is all love, all heart, and all honesty". Kim Hughes of Parton and Pearl described the album as "beautiful, melodic, earnest, important and nearly perfect" as well as "soul-affirming". Nanci Dagg of Canadian Beats Media said the songs were "well-thought-out".

== Track listing ==
What Is Life? track listing
No.	Title	Writer(s)	Length
1.	"What Is Life?" (A Perspective)	Brett Kissel; Graham Wardle	1:54
2.	"Make a Life, Not a Living"	Cary Barlowe; Brandon Day; Steven Lee Olsen	2:47
3.	"Die to Go Home"	Kissel; Jesse Frasure	3:08
4.	"From Aria" (Interlude) (featuring Aria Kissel)		0:22
5.	"Down to Earth"	Kissel; Eric Paslay	3:03
6.	"Better Bad Idea"	Kissel; Dave Thomson	3:22
7.	"Night in the Life"	Andrew Dorff; Brad Tursi; Jonathan Singleton	3:26
8.	"From Leo" (Interlude) (featuring Leo Kissel)		0:24
9.	"Everything in the Rearview"	Day; Olsen; Jordan Minton	3:06
10.	"Slidin' Your Way"	Justin Wilson; Michael Lotten; Trea Landon; Chapin Hartford; Donald Pfrimmer; James Foster (Note: Contains a sample of "Meet in the Middle" by Diamond Rio.)	3:16
11.	"Without"	Kissel; Barlowe; Frasure	2:50
12.	"From This Day Forward"	Austin Taylor Smith	3:33
13.	"From Mila" (Interlude) (featuring Mila Kissel)		0:32
14.	"Kindness"	Kissel; Matt Rogers	3:02
Total length:			34:45

== Charts ==
=== Singles ===
Chart performance for singles from What Is Life?
Year	Single	Peak chart positions		Certifications
Year	Single	CAN Country	CAN	Certifications
2021	"Make a Life, Not a Living"	1	49	MC: Platinum
2021	"Night in the Life"	15	—	

== Awards and nominations ==
Year	Association	Category	Nominated work	Result	Ref.
2021	Canadian Country Music Association	Album of the Year	What is Life?	Nominated	
2021	Canadian Country Music Association	Video of the Year	"Make a Life, Not a Living"	Won	
2022	Juno Awards	Country Album of the Year	What is Life?	Won	
2022	Juno Awards	Single of the Year	"Make a Life, Not a Living"	Nominated	
2022	Canadian Country Music Association	Single of the Year	"Make a Life, Not a Living"	Nominated	

== Release history ==
Release formats for What is Life?
Country	Date	Format	Label	Ref.
Various	April 9, 2021	Digital download	Warner Music Canada; BAK 2 BAK Entertainment Inc.	
Various	April 9, 2021	Streaming	Warner Music Canada; BAK 2 BAK Entertainment Inc.	
Various	April 23, 2021	Compact disc	Warner Music Canada; BAK 2 BAK Entertainment Inc.	
Various	June 4, 2021	Vinyl	Warner Music Canada; BAK 2 BAK Entertainment Inc.	
United States	April 9, 2021	Digital download	ONErpm	
United States	April 9, 2021	Streaming	ONErpm	
