= Emma-Lee =

Canadian musician and photographer

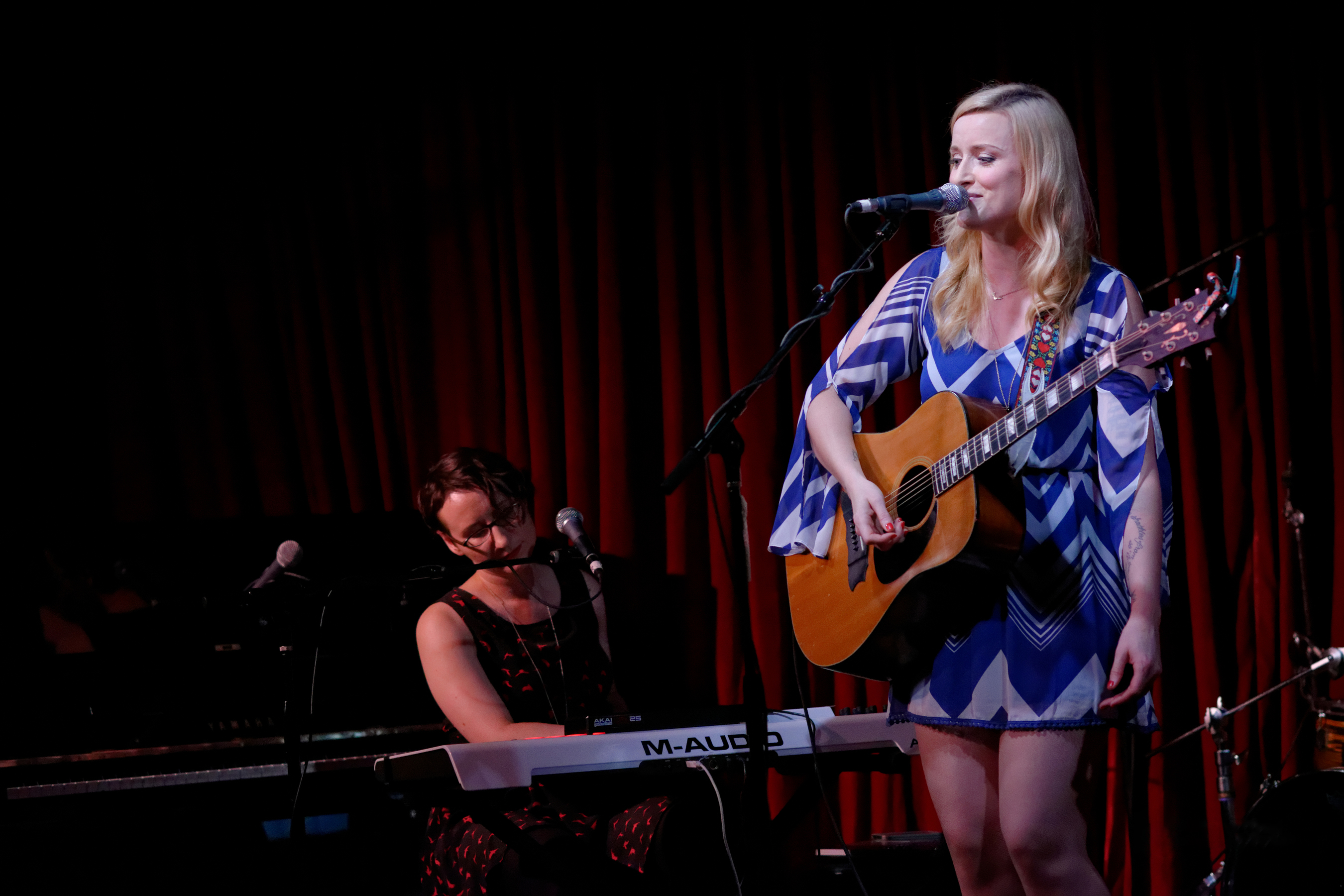
- Emma-Lee, June 2014

Background information
- Born: Emily Margo Doty; Toronto, Ontario, Canada
- Genre: Pop
- Occupations: Singer, songwriter, photographer
- Instruments: Vocals, guitar, piano
- Years active: 2004–present
- Website: emma-lee.com

Emma-Lee, is a Canadian pop singer, songwriter and photographer from Toronto, Ontario. She is considered a mezzo-soprano and is a self-taught vocalist. She has written hit songs for other artists in both the pop and country genres.

== Early life ==
Emma-Lee was born in Toronto and raised in Markham, Ontario. She started playing guitar at age 14 and credits her father for teaching her. She soon began writing her own songs.

=== Published works ===
==== Albums ====
===== Never Just a Dream =====
She released her debut album Never Just a Dream in 2008 to critical acclaim from the Toronto Star and the Globe and Mail. The album was picked up by Bumstead Records and re-released on March 3, 2009. Her vocal style is frequently compared to k.d. lang, Norah Jones and Feist. No Depression magazine described Never Just a Dream as "an album so full of ideas and potential that it is hard to know how to properly frame a description of its contents. It is a collection of songs that is far more than the sum of its influences" and dubbed her "the voice to remember from 2009."

Emma-Lee's song "That Sinking Feeling" was featured as the single of the week on iTunes Canada.

In November 2016 she released her first Christmas recording "It Won't Be Christmas" (by songwriters Karen Kosowski & Julie Crochetière) to radio and iTunes.

===== Backseat Heroine =====
On February 7, 2012, she released her long-awaited second album Backseat Heroine, co-produced by Emma-Lee, Karen Kosowski and Marc Rogers. The album features collaborations with Nicole Atkins, Jill Barber and Luke Doucet. Most of the album was tracked at The Chalet, a studio near Uxbridge, Ontario. Backseat Heroine blends multiple musical genres including pop, country, soul and rock. According to her online biography, "Emma-Lee's goal was to make a record that lived and breathed in its own world and could cross genres while still being a soundscape that was complete from start to finish."

== Discography ==
=== Albums ===
- 2009: Never Just a Dream (Bumstead Records)
- 2012: Backseat Heroine (eOne Music Canada)
- 2017: Fantasies: Volume 1 (Special Agent)

=== Singles ===
Year	Single	Peak positions		
Year	Single	CAN AC	CAN Hot AC	CBC Radio 2
2011	"Shot in the Dark"	—	—	—
2014	"What Would Tom Petty Do"	—	—	9
2015	"All the Way"	—	—	—
2016	"Worst Enemy"	18	24	—
2016	"It Won't Be Christmas"	4	—	—
"—" denotes releases that did not chart

== Awards and nominations ==
- 2014, won for best female vocalist in NOW Magazine's best of Toronto feature.
- 2013, her album Backseat Heroine won "Best Adult Contemporary Album" and the video for "Shadow of a Ghost" was nominated for "Best Short Form Music Video" for the 12th annual Independent Music Awards.
- 2013, her album Backseat Heroine won the 12th annual Independent Music Awards Vox Pop Fan Choice Award for "Best Adult Contemporary Album" and the video for "Shadow of a Ghost" won the Independent Music Awards Vox Pop Fan Choice Award for "Best Short Form Music Video."
- 2013, won for best female vocalist in NOW Magazine's best of Toronto feature.
- 2012, nominated for a CBC Radio 3 BUCKY award in the category of Hottest Pipes.
- 2010, Emma-Lee's song "Until We Meet Again" from the album Never Just a Dream won in the 9th annual Independent Music Awards as "best love song".

== Film/TV placements ==
- "Boomerang" in Syfy's Wynonna Earp
- "All The Way" in CBC's Hello Goodbye
- "Flow" in Degrassi: The Next Generation, CBC's The Border and Bomb Girls
- "Pick Me Up, Dust Me Off" in CBC's Heartland - performed by Carleton Stone
- "Never Just a Dream" in CBC's 18 to Life and Alias
- "That Sinking Feeling" in Tyler Perry's Why Did I Get Married Too?
- "Shot In The Dark" in HBO's Bloodletting and Miraculous Cures, Lifetime's Dance Moms, promotional ad for FX's Wilfred, 2014 feature film The Scarehouse
- "I Could Live With Dying Tonight" in NBC's Saving Hope and MTV's Teen Wolf
- "Shadow Of a Ghost" in Degrassi: The Next Generation
- "Figure It Out" in Beauty & the Beast
- "It Won't Be Christmas 'Til You're Here" in CBS' NCIS: Los Angeles - performed by Julie Crochetière

== Collaborations ==
- sings backing vocals on the album "Let Me Prove It To You" by Steve Strongman (2014)
- sings backing vocals on the album "Rustbucket" by Sean Pinchin (2013)
- sings on "I Put a Spell On You" and "Ne Me Quitte Pas" on Jesse Cook's The Blue Guitar Sessions album (2012)
- sings a duet with country music artist Josh Macumber on his song "Tomorrow" (Josh Macumber Was Here, 2012)
- sings on "It Was You" by Peter Katz (Still Mind Still, 2012)
- sings on Jill Barber's song "Took Me By Surprise" (Mischievous Moon, 2011)
- sings on Rob Szabo's song "Something Like Me" (Rob Szabo, 2011)

== Songwriting credits (selected discography) ==
Title	Artist	Album	Label
Confession	MacKenzie Porter	Nobody's Born with a Broken Heart	Big Loud
Starts and Ends	Brett Kissel	The Compass Project	Big Star Recordings
Bad for Me	Tebey	The Good Ones	Jayward Artist Group
What Are You Gonna Tell Her?	Mickey Guyton	Bridges	Universal Music Group Nashville
Bridges	Mickey Guyton	Bridges	Universal Music Group Nashville
Home To Me	Ross Ellis	Single	Sony Music Nashville
Good Love	Shawn Hook	Take Me Home	Ultra Music
I Still See You At Parties	Port Cities and Emma-Lee	Single	Independent/Warner Canada
She Drives Me Crazy	Brett Kissel	Now or Never	Warner Music Canada
Hummingbird	Brett Kissel	Now or Never	Warner Music Canada
Country Thunder	The Washboard Union	Single	Warner Music Canada
Memphis T-Shirt	Melanie Dyer	Single	Universal Australia
Lit In The Sticks	Ryan Langdon	Single	Hidden Pony
Wasted	Sam Drysdale	Single	Warner Music Canada
Wild At Heart	The Abrams	Reminder	Warner Music Canada
Care	Whitney Woerz	Single	600 Volt
How It's Done	Kendra Kay	Single	Independent
Wasted	Sam Drysdale	Single	Warner Music Canada
Swerve	Samara Yung	Single	Independent
Over Me	Michelle Treacy	Insane	Independent
What A Song Should Do	Tim Hicks	New Tattoo	Open Road Recordings
So Fresh & Legs	Stacey Kay	11 O'Clock Number	Independent
The Story	Leah Daniels	The Story	LDM Entertainment
I Don't Wanna Know	Kira Isabella	Sides	Creator
Anthem	Brett Kissel	We Were That Song	Warner Music Canada
No Last Call	Dan Davidson	Found	
Pony Up & Jim, Jack, Johnnie & Jose	Nice Horse	A Little Unstable	Coalition Entertainment
Colours	Michelle Treacy	Single	Sony Music Canada
Live On Your Love	SATE	Red Black & Blue	CLK Creative Works
Crush	Madeline Merlo	Free Soul	Open Road Recordings
I'm So Over Getting Over You	Kira Isabella	Single	Sony Music Canada
Salt Water	Leah Daniels	What It Feels Like	Independent
A Little Bit Goes A Long Way	River Town Saints	Single	Open Road Recordings
Only The Strong Survive	Alee	Single	Wax Records
Sawdust	Victoria Duffield	Accelerate	Warner Music Canada
Pick Me Up, Dust Me Off	Carleton Stone	Draws Blood	Groundswell Music
One More Light	Alee	This Road Goes Everywhere	Independent
Cabin Fever & Man Up!	Tia Brazda	Cabin Fever	Rebeluck Records
Sheets	Carleton Stone	Carleton Stone	Groundswell Music
Fall Apart	Sabrina Carpenter	Single	Independent
