= 3-2-1 (Brett Kissel song) =

Single by Brett Kissel

from the album Started with a Song
- Released: February 2014
- Genre: Country
- Length: 3:35
- Label: Warner Music Canada
- Songwriter(s): Brett Kissel; Marv Green; Tim Nichols

Brett Kissel singles chronology
"Raise Your Glass" (2013)	"3-2-1" (2014)	"Tough People Do" (2014)

"3-2-1" is a song recorded by Canadian country music artist Brett Kissel. It was released in February 2014 as the third single from his major label debut album, Started with a Song. Kissel wrote the song with Marv Green and Tim Nichols.

== Music video ==
The music video was directed by Shaun Silva and released on February 24, 2014. It reached number one on the CMT Chevy Top 20 Countdown and won the Canadian Country Music Association award for CMT Video of the Year.

== Chart performance ==
"3-2-1" debuted at No. 31 on the Billboard Canada Country chart and peaked No. 3.

Chart (2014)	Peak position
Canada (Canadian Hot 100)	52
Canada Country (Billboard)	3

== Certifications ==
Region	Certification	Certified units/sales
Canada (Music Canada)	Platinum	80,000^{‡}
^{‡} Sales+streaming figures based on certification alone.
