= Now or Never (Brett Kissel album) =

2020 studio album by Brett Kissel

Studio album by Brett Kissel
- Released: January 1, 2020
- Recorded: 2019
- Genre: Country
- Length: 26:04
- Label: Warner Music Canada; BAK 2 BAK Entertainment Inc.
- Producer: Bart McKay; Jacob Durrett; Brett Kissel

Brett Kissel chronology
We Were That Song (2017)	Now or Never (2020)	What Is Life? (2021)

Singles from Now or Never
- 1. "Drink About Me" Released: September 6, 2019; 2. "She Drives Me Crazy" Released: February 1, 2020; 3. "A Few Good Stories" Released: September 11, 2020

Now or Never is the fourth studio album by Canadian country music singer Brett Kissel. It was released on January 1, 2020 via Warner Music Canada. It won Album of the Year at the 2020 Canadian Country Music Association Awards.

== Background ==
Kissel said "in previous years, previous albums, I didn’t have the courage to do a traditional country music on a project. Well, now we’ve recorded one. In previous years, I didn’t have the balls to record something so Pop/EDM because I was afraid of what people would think. Well, I’ve got one like that. All in all, I just wanted to destroy the box of what I thought was possible for a country record".

== Content ==
"Now or Never" features eight tracks in total including Kissel's debut American single and #1 Canadian country hit "Drink About Me". Kissel noted how he incorporated tracks of different styles between traditional country, Canadian country, and pop country. Kissel stated that some songs found "a new direction" while others took him in "the direction of his roots", and that the album has "something for everybody".

== Track listing ==
Now or Never track listing
No.	Title	Writer(s)	Length
1.	"Drink About Me"	Ben Stennis; Matt Rogers	3:11
2.	"A Few Good Stories"	Ben Hayslip; Chris Stevens; Rhett Akins	2:45
3.	"That's Country Music"	Brett Kissel; Karen Kosowski; Phil Barton	4:16
4.	"Young Enough"	David Hodges; Jessi Alexander; Will Weatherly	3:21
5.	"She Drives Me Crazy"	Kissel; Emma-Lee Doty; Kosowski	3:04
6.	"Hummingbird"	Kissel; Doty; Kosowski	2:57
7.	"I'm Not Him, I'm Not Her" (featuring Christina Taylor)	Kissel	3:52
8.	"Coffee with Her"	Hodges; Daniel Ross; Laura Veltz	2:42
Total length:			26:04

== Personnel ==
Adapted from the CD booklet.

- Jess Baumung - photography
- Ben Bradley - drums
- Spencer Cheyne - engineering, gang vocals
- Spencer Clark - engineering
- Jim Cooley - mixing
- Ben Dartnell - photography
- Emma-Lee Doty - background vocals
- Jacob Durrett - production, recording, engineering, programming, electric guitar, acoustic guitar, bass guitar, drums, banjo, background vocals
- Jordan Eberle - gang vocals
- Josh Gwilliam - engineering
- Mitch Jay - steel guitar
- Mike Johnson - steel guitar
- Jeff King - electric guitar
- Brett Kissel - lead vocals, production, electric guitar, acoustic guitar, banjo, background vocals, album artwork
- Cecilia Kissel - photography
- Karen Kosowski - engineering, recording, vocal production, programming, piano
- Justin Kudding - bass guitar, gang vocals
- Bart McKay - production, recording, mixing, engineering, programming, piano, symphony programming, gang vocals
- Matty McKay - engineering, vocal coaching, electric guitar, acoustic guitar, background vocals
- Marc Rogers - bass guitar
- Matt Rogers - background vocals
- Connor Scheffler - album artwork
- Ben Stennis - programming
- Matt Streuby - gang vocals
- Chris Stevens - programming
- Christina Taylor - featured vocals on "I'm Not Him, I'm Not Her"
- Tyler Volrath - acoustic guitar, fiddle, mandolin, banjo
- Will Weatherly - programming

== Charts ==
Sales chart performance for Now or Never
Chart (2020)	Peak position
Canadian Albums (Billboard)	43
US Country Album Sales (Billboard)	40
US Heatseekers Albums (Billboard)	18

Chart performance for singles from Now or Never
Year	Single	Peak chart positions		Certifications
Year	Single	CAN Country	CAN	Certifications
2019	"Drink About Me"	1	61	MC: Platinum
2020	"She Drives Me Crazy"	12	78	MC: Platinum
2020	"A Few Good Stories"	1	62	MC: Gold

== Awards and nominations ==
Year	Award	Category	Work	Result	Ref
2020	CCMA	Album of the Year	Now or Never	Won	
2020	CCMA	Video of the Year	"Drink About Me"	Nominated	
2021	Juno Awards	Single of the Year	"Drink About Me"	Nominated	

== Release history ==
Release formats for Now or Never
Country	Date	Format	Label	Ref.
Various	January 1, 2020	Digital download	Warner Music Canada; BAK 2 BAK Entertainment Inc.	
Various	January 1, 2020	Compact disc	Warner Music Canada; BAK 2 BAK Entertainment Inc.	
Various	January 1, 2020	Streaming	Warner Music Canada; BAK 2 BAK Entertainment Inc.	
Various	January 31, 2020	Vinyl	Warner Music Canada; BAK 2 BAK Entertainment Inc.	

== See also ==
- List of 2020 albums
