= We Were That Song =

Studio album by Brett Kissel
- Released: December 8, 2017
- Genre: Country
- Length: 45:19
- Label: Warner Music Canada
- Producer: Bart McKay; Spencer Cheyne; Brett Kissel; Justin Kudding; Luke Wooten

Brett Kissel chronology
Pick Me Up (2015)	We Were That Song (2017)	Now or Never (2020)

Singles from We Were That Song
- 1. "We Were That Song" Released: September 12, 2017; 2. "Anthem" Released: January 12, 2018; 3. "Guitars and Gasoline" Released: May 2018; 4. "Cecilia" Released: October 2018

We Were That Song is the third major label studio album recorded by Canadian country music singer Brett Kissel. It was released December 8, 2017 through Warner Music Canada. We Were That Song entered the Canadian Albums Chart at number 29.

The album has produced four top-ten singles, including the Music Canada Gold-certified title track and "Anthem". It includes collaborations with Dave Mustaine of Megadeth and country music icon Charley Pride.

== Critical reception ==
Anthony Easton of Exclaim! was highly critical of the album in terms of both production and lyrical content, describing it as "the worst country album of the year," and writing that "the stories [Kissel] tells are ones that we have heard before."

We Were That Song was given the Juno Award for Country Album of the Year in 2019. This marked Kissel's first win in the category, after being nominated with his previous two releases.

== Track listing ==
No.	Title	Writer(s)	Length
1.	"We Were That Song"	Barry Dean; Melissa Peirce; Jonathan Singleton	3:20
2.	"Anthem"	Phil Barton; Emma-Lee; Karen Kosowski	4:01
3.	"Guitars and Gasoline"	Ash Bowers; Dustin Lynch; Matthew Rogers	3:42
4.	"Nights in the Sun" (featuring Grandpa Bear)	Ted Hewitt; Brett Kissel; Phil O'Donnell	4:30
5.	"Between You and Me"	Andy Albert; Dave Pittenger; Mitchell Tenpenny; Justin Wilson	2:58
6.	"That's How the World Ends"	Jimmy Robbins; Wilson	3:03
7.	"Slow Me Down"	Jessi Alexander; Matt Dragstrem; Josh Thompson	3:24
8.	"Cecilia"	Kissel; Seth Mosley; Brad Rempel	3:24
9.	"Shootin' It"	Devin Dawson; Jacob Durrett; Kissel; Austin Smith	2:56
10.	"Damn!" (featuring Dave Mustaine)	Kissel; Brian Maher; Wilson	3:41
11.	"Drink, Cuss, or Fish"	Corey Crowder; Justin Lantz; John Pierce	3:16
12.	"God Made Daughters"	Kissel; Brice Long	3:27
13.	"Burgers and Fries" (featuring Charley Pride)	Ben Peters	3:48
Total length:			45:19

== Charts ==
Chart (2017)	Peak position
Canadian Albums (Billboard)	29

== Release history ==
Country	Date	Format	Label	Ref.
Various	December 8, 2017	Digital download	Warner Music Canada; BAK 2 BAK	
Various	December 15, 2017	Compact disc	Warner Music Canada; BAK 2 BAK	
Various	June 1, 2018	Vinyl	Warner Music Canada; BAK 2 BAK	
