= Cowboys & Dreamers =

Single by Brett Kissel

from the album Let Your Horses Run – The Album
- Released: May 4, 2025
- Genre: Country
- Length: 3:09
- Label: Big Star
- Songwriters: Jim Beavers; Brice Long; Lindsay Rimes
- Producer: Mickey Jack Cones

Brett Kissel singles chronology
"Another One" (2024)	"Cowboys & Dreamers" (2025)	"Hurtin' Songs" (2025)

Music video
- "Cowboys & Dreamers" on YouTube

"Cowboys & Dreamers" is a song recorded by Canadian country music artist Brett Kissel. The song was written by Jim Beavers, brice Long, and Lindsay Rimes, and produced by Mickey Jack Cones. It was the fourth single to Canadian radio, and second to Australian radio, off Kissel's 2025 studio album, Let Your Horses Run – The Album.

== Commercial performance ==
"Cowboys & Dreamers" reached a peak of number four on the Billboard Canada Country chart for the week of September 6, 2025. This marked Kissel's twentieth career top ten song. It entered the all-genre Canadian Hot 100 at number 98 the following week. Later in the year, it reached number 14 on Radiomonitor's Country Hot 50 in Australia.

== Music video ==
The official music video for "Cowboys & Dreamers" was directed by Travis Nesbitt and premiered on Holler Country on June 17, 2025. The video featured bull riders Brock Radford, Ashton Sahli, Jeremy Maisonneuve, Sloan Walker, Chanse Switzer, Garrett Green, Jake Gardner and Gordon Erickson, as well as bull fighters Ty Prescott, Brett Monea, and Connor Larrivee. Kissel also rode a bull himself in the video, and performed the song in front of a bull at rodeo arena for part of the video. He described it as the "most intense" video that he has filmed in his career, and stated that the "adrenaline matched with the mad respect" he has for bull riders.

== Credits and personnel ==
Credits adapted from Apple Music.

- Mickey Jack Cones – acoustic guitar, background vocals, electric guitar, programming, keyboards
- Evan Hutchings – drums
- Mike Johnson – steel guitar, slide guitar
- Jeff King – electric guitar
- Brett Kissel – lead vocals
- Troy Lancaster – electric guitar
- Carl Miner – acoustic guitar
- Michael Rinne – bass guitar, electric bass guitar
- Tyler Volrath – fiddle
- Jimmy Wallace – keyboards

== Charts ==
Chart performance for "Cowboys & Dreamers"
Chart (2025)	Peak position
Australia Country Hot 50 (The Music)	14
Canada Hot 100 (Billboard)	98
Canada Country (Billboard)	4
