= Let Your Horses Run =

2024 song by Brett Kissel

Single by Brett Kissel

from the album Let Your Horses Run – The Album
- Released: May 3, 2024
- Genre: Country
- Length: 2:59
- Label: Big Star
- Songwriters: Brett Kissel; Jesse Frasure
- Producers: Jesse Frasure; Michael "X" O'Connor; Seth Mosley

Brett Kissel singles chronology
"Two of Us" (2023)	"Let Your Horses Run" (2024)	"Another One" (2024)

Music video
- "Let Your Horses Run" on YouTube

"Let Your Horses Run" is a song co-written and recorded by Canadian country music artist Brett Kissel. He wrote the song with Jesse Frasure, who co-produced it with Michael "X" O'Connor and Seth Mosley.

== Background ==
Kissel wrote the song "in a few hours" with Nashville songwriter Jesse Frasure. He stated that the song is "an advice song for anyone ready to take on the next big leap in their life, explaining that you can be a force of nature if you want to be, and you can be unstoppable if you put your mind to something that inspires". Kissel added that the song was "special as a parent" for him, as his kids "can listen to this song years from now, and understand that these are encouraging words".

== Critical reception ==
Nanci Dagg of Canadian Beats Media favourably spoke of the song, stating it "gallops forth with an intensity that is both invigorating and inspiring, showcasing Kissel’s evolution as a songwriter and performer," and opined that it "may be his most-compelling vocal performance to date". Hannah Means-Shannon of Wildfire Music + News wrote that the song "shows Kissel’s journey towards artistic maturity".

== Critical reception ==
Lily Braendle of Front Porch Music described the song as a "catchy tune", noting that the "lyrics do a great job at painting a picture of the simple joys and special moments of country living". An uncredited author from RFD-TV called the song a "a powerful anthem that captures the authenticity of [the duo's] rural roots".

== Accolades ==
Year	Association	Category	Result	Ref
2025	Canadian Country Music Association	Single of the Year	Nominated	
2025	Canadian Country Music Association	Video of the Year	Nominated	

== Music video ==
The official music video for "Let Your Horses Run" premiered on YouTube on July 19, 2024. Kissel dedicated the song to his four children in the video, which he described as "kind of like a love letter" to his home province of Alberta. The video featured a nine-year-old race horse named Kenlee.

== Track listings ==
Digital download

1. "Let Your Horses Run" – 2:59

Digital download – acoustic mix

1. "Let Your Horses Run" (acoustic mix) – 2:58

== Charts ==
Chart performance for "Let Your Horses Run"
Chart (2024–2025)	Peak position
Australia Country Hot 50 (The Music)	4
Canada Hot 100 (Billboard)	89
Canada Country (Billboard)	4

== Certifications ==
Region	Certification	Certified units/sales
Canada (Music Canada)	Gold	40,000^{‡}
^{‡} Sales+streaming figures based on certification alone.
