= Anthem (Brett Kissel song) =

2018 Brett Kissel song

Single by Brett Kissel

from the album We Were That Song
- Released: January 12, 2018
- Genre: Country pop
- Length: 4:01
- Label: Warner Canada; BAK 2 BAK
- Songwriter(s): Phil Barton; Emma-Lee Doty; Karen Kosowski
- Producer(s): Brett Kissel; Luke Wooten

Brett Kissel singles chronology
"We Were That Song" (2017)	"Anthem" (2018)	"Guitars and Gasoline" (2018)

Music video
- "Anthem" on YouTube

"Anthem" is a song recorded by Canadian country artist Brett Kissel. The song was written by Phil Barton, Emma-Lee, and Karen Kosowski, and was the second single off his Juno Award-winning studio album We Were That Song.

== Critical reception ==
Front Porch Music noted elements of dance and pop music in "Anthem". They called it a "departure" from Kissel's usual music stating it could "open up a brand new demographic for him and attract some new fans", and that it was "refreshing" and would "definitely be a hit".

== Commercial performance ==
"Anthem" reached a peak of number 6 on the Billboard Canada Country chart dated March 24, 2018. It was certified Gold by Music Canada.

== Music video ==
The official music video for "Anthem" was directed by Blake McWilliam and premiered on February 2, 2018.

== Charts ==
Chart (2018)	Peak position
Canada Country (Billboard)	8

== Certifications ==
Region	Certification	Certified units/sales
Canada (Music Canada)	Gold	40,000^{‡}
^{‡} Sales+streaming figures based on certification alone.
