= Drink About Me =

2019 song by Brett Kissel

Single by Brett Kissel

from the album Now or Never
- Released: September 6, 2019
- Genre: Country
- Length: 3:11
- Label: Warner Canada; BAK 2 BAK; Go Long
- Songwriter(s): Ben Stennis; Matt Rogers
- Producer(s): Brett Kissel; Jacob Durrett

Brett Kissel singles chronology
"Cecilia" (2018)	"Drink About Me" (2019)	"She Drives Me Crazy" (2020)

Music video
- "Drink About Me" on YouTube

"Drink About Me" is a song recorded by Canadian country music artist Brett Kissel for his eighth studio album Now or Never. The song was written by Ben Stennis and Matt Rogers, while Kissel co-produced the track with Jacob Durrett. The track was Kissel's first release to the American country radio format. "Drink About Me" was nominated for Single of the Year at the Juno Awards of 2021.

== Background ==
Kissel remarked that Jeff Long of Go Long Entertainment was the first to show him "Drink About Me". He then told Long "If you can talk to the songwriters and publishers and have me cut it, I'll do it". Two months later, Kissel was playing at the Bluebird Café in Nashville when he invited the writer of the song, Matt Rogers on stage. Rogers then sang the song live and Kissel told him "if you give me permission to cut this song ... I promise you I will place it as my first single" regarding his then-upcoming album. Kissel said "When you hear this song, I hope you’ll reminisce about your best days. Happiest times. First kiss. Longest kiss. Warmest embrace. Let this song surround you. And let these memories come flooding back".

== Critical reception ==
Front Porch Music referred to the track as "an emotional single that humbles us all".

== Accolades ==
Year	Award	Category	Result	Ref
2020	CCMA	Video of the Year	Nominated	
2021	Juno Awards	Single of the Year	Nominated	

== Commercial performance ==
"Drink About Me" reached a peak of Number One on the Billboard Canada Country chart dated January 25, 2020. It marks Kissel's second Number One hit on the chart after "Airwaves". It also peaked at number 61 on the Billboard Canadian Hot 100, his first single to chart there since "I Didn't Fall in Love with Your Hair" in 2016. The song was certified Platinum by Music Canada on June 8, 2021, with over 80,000 sales. As of June 2021, it has received over 15 million streams through Spotify.

== Music video ==
The official music video for "Drink About Me" was directed by Blake McWilliam and premiered September 7, 2019. It features The Bachelorette star Kaitlyn Bristowe and her partner Jason Tartick and was filmed on South Andros Island in The Bahamas. The video was nominated for Video of the Year at the 2020 CCMA Awards.

== Charts ==
Chart (2020)	Peak position
Canada (Canadian Hot 100)	61
Canada Country (Billboard)	1
US Rolling Stone Trending 25	4

== Certifications ==
Region	Certification	Certified units/sales
Canada (Music Canada)	Platinum	80,000^{‡}
^{‡} Sales+streaming figures based on certification alone.
