= We Were That Song (song) =

Single by Brett Kissel

from the album We Were That Song
- Released: September 10, 2017
- Genre: Country
- Length: 3:20
- Label: BAK 2 BAK; Warner Music Canada
- Songwriter(s): Barry Dean; Melissa Peirce; Jonathan Singleton
- Producer(s): Brett Kissel; Bart McKay; Luke Wooten

Brett Kissel singles chronology
"She's Desire" (2017)	"We Were That Song" (2017)	"Anthem" (2018)

"We Were That Song" is a song recorded by Canadian country music artist Brett Kissel for his seventh studio album of the same name (2017). The song was written by Barry Dean, Melissa Peirce, and Jonathan Singleton, while Kissel co-produced the track with Bart McKay and Luke Wooten. Kissel debuted "We Were That Song" at the 2017 Canadian Country Music Association Awards on September 10, 2017 and it was released to digital retailers that evening by BAK 2 BAK Entertainment and Warner Music Canada.

The song reached a peak position of four on the Canada Country chart, earning Kissel his tenth top ten single.

== Music video ==
The accompanying video for "We Were That Song" was directed by Blake McWilliam and premiered September 10, 2017.

== Charts ==
Chart (2017)	Peak position
Canada Country (Billboard)	4
Canada Digital Songs (Billboard)	34

== Certifications ==
Region	Certification	Certified units/sales
Canada (Music Canada)	Gold	40,000^{‡}
^{‡} Sales+streaming figures based on certification alone.
