= Pick Me Up (album) =

Studio album by Brett Kissel
- Released: September 11, 2015
- Genre: Country
- Length: 35:54
- Label: Warner Music Canada
- Producer: Mickey Jack Cones; Brett Kissel; Bart McKay

Brett Kissel chronology
Started with a Song (2013)	Pick Me Up (2015)	We Were That Song (2017)

Singles from Pick Me Up
- 1. "Airwaves" Released: June 19, 2015; 2. "Pick Me Up" Released: October 2015; 3. "Cool with That" Released: April 2016; 4. "I Didn't Fall in Love with Your Hair" Released: September 2016; 5. "She's Desire" Released: January 16, 2017

Pick Me Up is the second studio album by Canadian country music artist Brett Kissel. It was released on September 11, 2015, via Warner Music Canada. The album includes the number one single "Airwaves".

Upon release, Pick Me Up debuted at number seven on the Canadian Albums Chart.

== Promotion ==
In the fall of 2014, Kissel opened for Brad Paisley on the Canadian leg of his then-current tour and began playing material from what would become Pick Me Up. Kissel will headline "The Airwaves Tour 2015" in promotion of Pick Me Up beginning on October 10 in Simcoe, Ontario. Dates were announced through to November 28, with additional stops to be added. He also performed at the Grand Ole Opry on August 29, 2015.

=== Singles ===
On June 19, 2015, "Airwaves" was released to digital retailers and Canadian country radio as the album's lead single. It entered the Billboard Canada Country airplay chart at number 31 as the most-added single of the week and reached the number one position on the chart dated October 3, 2015. It has also charted on the Billboard Canadian Hot 100 at number 61.

== Track listing ==
No.	Title	Writer(s)	Producer(s)	Length
1.	"Pick Me Up"	Cary Barlowe, Chase Bryant, Hillary Lindsey	Mickey Jack Cones	3:22
2.	"Airwaves"	Zach Crowell, Matt Jenkins, Jonathan Singleton	Cones	3:29
3.	"Cool with That"	Ted Hewitt, Brett Kissel, Phil O'Donnell	Bart McKay, Kissel	3:49
4.	"Feet Back on the Ground"	Casey Beathard, Tony Martin, Neil Thrasher	McKay, Kissel	3:25
5.	"I Can Play Guitar" (featuring Hunter Hayes)	Kissel, Troy Olsen	McKay, Kissel	4:25
6.	"She's Desire"	Jake Mitchell, Jason Mizelle, JP Williams	Cones	3:11
7.	"Why Won't You"	Adrienne Follesé, Keith Follesé, Kissel	Cones	4:18
8.	"I Hope It's Me"	Jacob Bryant, John Davidson, Gordie Sampson	Cones	3:17
9.	"That's Why God Made Guitars"	Ashley Gorley, Jenkins, Lindsey	McKay, Kissel	3:20
10.	"I Didn't Fall in Love with Your Hair" (with Carolyn Dawn Johnson)	Rachel Bradshaw, Kyle Jacobs, Billy Montana	McKay, Kissel	3:18
Total length:				35:54

== Credits and personnel ==
Credits adapted from liner notes.

Recorded and engineered at

- Nashville, Tennessee (Westwood Studios)
- Saskatoon, Saskatchewan (Bart McKay Productions)

Mastered at

- Nashville, Tennessee (Georgetown Masters)

Performance credits

- All vocals – Brett Kissel
  - Featured vocals – Carolyn Dawn Johnson
  - Background vocals – Mickey Jack Cones, Matty McKay, Brett Kissel, Russell Terrell, the Good Friday Choir

Instruments

- Bass – Mark Hill, Justin Kudding, Derek Stremel
- Drums – Chad Malchert, Nir Z
- Fiddle – Tyler Vollrath
- Guitars (acoustic and electric) – Mickey Jack Cones, J.T. Corenflos, Hunter Hayes, Jeff King, Brett Kissel, Troy Lancaster, B. James Lowry, Matty McKay
- Mandolin – Troy Lancaster, Matty McKay
- Piano and synthesizer – Mickey Jack Cones, Tony Harrell, Bart McKay
- Percussion – Mickey Jack Cones
- Steel guitar – Randle Currie, Mike Johnson

Production

- Engineers – Mickey Jack Cones, Bart McKay, Dave Salley
  - Assistant engineers – Brady Tilow
- Management – Louis O'Reilly, Invictus Entertainment (Canada); Bob Doyle, Major Bob Music (US)
  - Management Agency – Jim Cressman, Invictus Entertainment (IEG)
- Mastering – Andrew Mendelson
- Mixers – Mickey Jack Cones, Bart McKay, Brett Kissel
- Packaging designer – Patrick Duffy for Attention
- Photographer – Juan Pont Lezica
- Record producer – Mickey Jack Cones, Bart McKay, Brett Kissel
- Programming and editing – Mickey Jack Cones, Brady Tilow
- Songwriters – Cary Barlowe, Casey Beathard, Rachel Bradshaw, Chase Bryant, Jacob Bryant, Zach Crowell, John Davidson, Adrienne Follesé, Keith Follesé, Ashley Gorley, Ted Hewitt, Kyle Jacobs, Matt Jenkins, Brett Kissel, Hillary Lindsey, Tony Martin, Jake Mitchell, Jason Mizelle, Billy Montana, Phil O'Donnell, Troy Olsen, Gordie Sampson, Jonathan Singleton, Neil Thrasher, JP Williams

Additional credits

- Hunter Hayes appears courtesy of Atlantic Recording Corporation
- Carolyn Dawn Johnson appears courtesy of Dancing Lily Music

== Chart performance ==
=== Album ===
Chart (2015)	Peak position
Canadian Albums (Billboard)	7

=== Singles ===
Year	Single	Peak chart positions	
Year	Single	CAN Country	CAN
2015	"Airwaves"	1	61
2015	"Pick Me Up"	6	86
2016	"Cool with That"	8	—
2016	"I Didn't Fall in Love with Your Hair"	16	88
2017	"She's Desire"	6	—
