= Started with a Song =

Studio album by Brett Kissel
- Released: October 1, 2013
- Genre: Country
- Length: 38:20
- Label: Warner Music Canada
- Producers: Ted Hewitt; Brett Kissel; Bart McKay; Ben Phillips

Brett Kissel chronology
My Roots Run Deep (2008)	Started with a Song (2013)	Pick Me Up (2015)

Singles from Started with a Song
- 1. "Started with a Song" Released: June 17, 2013; 2. "Raise Your Glass" Released: October 7, 2013; 3. "3-2-1" Released: February 2014; 4. "Tough People Do" Released: July 2014; 5. "Something You Just Don't Forget" Released: November 2014

Professional ratings
Review scores
Source	Rating
Edmonton Journal	4/5 stars

Started with a Song is the major label debut album by Canadian country music artist Brett Kissel. It was released on October 1, 2013, via Warner Music Canada.

Started with a Song was nominated for Country Album of the Year at the 2014 Juno Awards.

== Critical reception ==
Amanda Ash of the Edmonton Journal gave the album four stars out of five, calling it "a wham-bam collection of 10 sweeping love songs and lively party anthems that leave you glossy-eyed and daydream drunk." Ash wrote that "his songs like to play hooky with pop punches and rock growls, making for a cross-genre record that will surely befriend a very large audience."

== Track listing ==
No.	Title	Writer(s)	Length
1.	"Started with a Song"	Brett Kissel, Craig Wiseman	4:18
2.	"Tough People Do"	Kissel, Ben Hayslip, Ted Hewitt	3:34
3.	"3-2-1"	Kissel, Marv Green, Tim Nichols	3:35
4.	"Something You Just Don't Forget"	Kissel, Hewitt	3:09
5.	"Raise Your Glass"	Kissel, Wade Kirby, Jason Matthews	3:51
6.	"Country in My Blood"	Kissel, Duane Steele	3:50
7.	"My Cowgirl"	Kissel, Steele	3:34
8.	"Girl in a Cowboy Hat"	Steve Fox, Troy Kokol	3:04
9.	"Canadian Kid"	Kissel, Tim Taylor	3:12
10.	"Together (Grandma & Grandpa's Song)"	Kissel	6:13
Total length:			38:20

Walmart Deluxe Edition
No.	Title	Length
11.	"She Knows What She Likes"	2:26
12.	"The Man I Am"	3:34
13.	"Long Hot Summer"	3:35

== Chart performance ==
=== Album ===
Chart (2013)	Peak position
Canadian Albums (Billboard)	22

=== Singles ===
Year	Single	Peak chart positions	
Year	Single	CAN Country	CAN
2013	"Started with a Song"	3	58
2013	"Raise Your Glass"	7	88
2014	"3-2-1"	3	52
2014	"Tough People Do"	9	99
2014	"Something You Just Don't Forget"	5	91
