= Two of Us (Brett Kissel and Cooper Alan song) =

2023 song by Brett Kissel and Cooper Alan

Single by Brett Kissel and Cooper Alan

from the album Let Your Horses Run – The Album
- Released: September 15, 2023
- Genre: Country
- Length: 3:15
- Label: Big Star
- Songwriters: Cooper Alan; Brett Kissel; Matt McKinney; Seth Mosley
- Producers: Michael "X" O'Connor; Seth Mosley

Brett Kissel singles chronology
| "Never Have I Ever" (2023) | "Two of Us" (2023) | "Let Your Horses Run" (2024) |

Music video
- "Two of Us" on YouTube

"Two of Us" is a song co-written and recorded by Canadian country music artist Brett Kissel and American country artist Cooper Alan. The two artists wrote the song with Matt McKinney and Seth Mosley, while Mosley produced the track with Michael "X" O'Connor.

== Background ==
Cooper Alan stated that he wanted to record a song with a Canadian country artist after appreciating the support he had received from fans in Canada while performing live shows there for the first time in 2023. He elected to post on social media platform TikTok, asking for suggestions of Canadian country artists to duet with. Brett Kissel publicly responded to the post, suggesting himself, and the two later got together to write "Two of Us" with Matt McKinney and Seth Mosley. Alan remarked that he had been a fan of Kissel prior to his original call for suggestions, and that he had hoped Kissel would reach out to him in response.

Kissel described the song as being about "making a new best friend and drinking buddy at a bar". He also stated that working with Alan was "so much fun". Alan framed the song as a modern take on Alan Jackson and Jimmy Buffett's 2003 hit "It's Five O'Clock Somewhere".

== Critical reception ==
James Daykin of Entertainment Focus stated that "Two of Us" is an example of the "magic that can happen when two remarkable talents join forces". Jenna Melanson of Canadian Beats Media referred to the song as an "electrifying duet".

== Live performance ==
Kissel and Alan performed "Two of Us" live at the 2023 Canadian Country Music Awards at the FirstOntario Centre in Hamilton, Ontario on September 16, 2023, one day after the song's official release. The award show was broadcast live on CTV in Canada, and their performance was later uploaded to YouTube.

== Accolades ==
| Year | Association | Category | Result | Ref |
|---|---|---|---|---|
| 2024 | Canadian Country Music Association | Musical Collaboration of the Year | Nominated | |
| 2024 | Canadian Country Music Association | Video of the Year | Nominated | |

== Credits and personnel ==
Credits adapted from AllMusic.

- Cooper Alan – composition, vocals
- Jonny Fung – banjo, guitar, mandolin
- Brett Kissel – composition, vocals
- Matt McKinney – composition
- Miles McPherson – drums
- Seth Mosley – bass guitar, composition, guitar, organ, production
- Crystal O'Connor – editing
- Michael "X" O'Connor – mixing, production
- Mark Troyer – engineering

== Charts ==
Chart performance for "Two of Us"
| Chart (2023–2024) | Peak position |
|---|---|
| Canada Country (Billboard) | 6 |
| Canada Digital Songs (Billboard) | 9 |
