= Reese Klaiber =

- Origin: Alberta, Canada
- Genres: Country
- Occupation: Singer
- Instrument(s): Vocals, guitar
- Years active: 1998–present
- Labels: RCM

Reese Klaiber is a Canadian country music artist. He lives in Alberta on a ranch. In 1998, Klaiber released his debut album, Where I Come From. His 1999 single "She's Sittin' Pretty" reached the Top 20 of the RPM Country Tracks chart.

== Discography ==
=== Albums ===
Year	Album
1998	Where I Come From

=== Singles ===
Year	Single	CAN Country	Album
1998	"Cowboy Up"	39	Where I Come From
1999	"She's Sittin' Pretty"	19	Where I Come From
1999	"Where I Come From"	41	Where I Come From
2000	"A Little Love"	—	Where I Come From
2000	"Makin' Noise"	*	Where I Come From
2001	"Sound of My Heart Breaking"	*	Where I Come From
