= I Didn't Fall in Love with Your Hair =

Single by Brett Kissel featuring Carolyn Dawn Johnson

from the album Pick Me Up
- Released: September 9, 2016
- Genre: Country
- Length: 3:18
- Label: Warner Music Canada
- Songwriters: Rachel Bradshaw; Kyle Jacobs; Billy Montana
- Producers: Bart McKay; Brett Kissel

Brett Kissel singles chronology
"Cool with That" (2016)	"I Didn't Fall in Love with Your Hair" (2016)	"She's Desire" (2017)

Carolyn Dawn Johnson singles chronology
"Reach You" (2012)	"I Didn't Fall in Love with Your Hair" (2016)	"Road Blocks" (2023)

Music video
- "I Didn't Fall in Love with Your Hair" on YouTube

"I Didn't Fall in Love with Your Hair" is a song recorded by Canadian country music artist Brett Kissel for his sixth studio album, Pick Me Up (2015). It was written by Rachel Bradshaw, Kyle Jacobs, and Billy Montana and features guest vocals by Canadian country singer Carolyn Dawn Johnson. The song was released to radio on September 9, 2016, as the album's fourth single.

Kissel debuted the song at the 2016 Canadian Country Music Association Awards ceremony on September 11, 2016. The single was released in collaboration with philanthropist W. Brett Wilson for Cancer Awareness Month, with proceeds from sales of the song between September 9 and October 28, 2016, being donated to the Canadian Cancer Society and being matching by Wilson.

"I Didn't Fall in Love with Your Hair" debuted at number 42 on the Canada Country airplay chart dated October 1, 2016. It peaked at number 16 in November 2016, making it Kissel's lowest-charting country single to date and first to miss the top ten.

== Critical reception ==
Markos Papadatos of Digital Journal rated the song and its music video five stars out of five, writing that "nobody tugs at the heartstrings like Brett Kissel does with [this song]," and labelling it as "by far the best song of his career." In a review of Pick Me Up, Bruce Leperre of the Winnipeg Free Press cited the song as the "highlight" of the album and a recommended track.

== Music video ==
The accompanying music video for the song premiered September 21, 2016 and is dedicated to Kissel's mother, who herself has battled cancer. It was filmed in Toronto, Ontario in August 2016.

== Chart performance ==
Chart (2016)	Peak position
Canada Hot 100 (Billboard)	88
Canada Country (Billboard)	16
