= Make a Life, Not a Living =

2021 Brett Kissel song

Single by Brett Kissel

from the album What Is Life?
- Released: March 5, 2021
- Genre: Country
- Length: 2:46
- Label: Warner Canada; BAK 2 BAK
- Songwriter(s): Cary Barlowe; Brandon Day; Steven Lee Olsen
- Producer(s): Bart McKay; Brett Kissel

Brett Kissel singles chronology
| "A Few Good Stories" (2020) | "Make a Life, Not a Living" (2021) | "Night in the Life" (2021) |

Music video
- "Make a Life, Not a Living" on YouTube

"Make a Life, Not a Living" is a song by Canadian country artist Brett Kissel. The track was co-written by Cary Barlowe, Brandon Day, and Steven Lee Olsen. It is the lead single from Kissel's album What Is Life?

== Background ==
Fellow Canadian country singer-songwriter Steven Lee Olsen co-wrote "Make a Life, Not a Living" and sent it to Kissel on his thirtieth birthday, telling him "if anybody is able to live, and eat, sleep and breathe these lyrics, it’s going to be you". Kissel remarked that he "immediately knew" he had to base his "entire record" and "whole new life" around the song. One month prior to the release of the song, Kissel revealed the lyrics "I'm trying to make a life... not a livin'". He announced he was taking a month off social media to 'live the lyrics', and returned to announce the new single.

== Critical reception ==
"Make a Life, Not a Living" received generally positive reviews. Caleigh DeCaprio of NY Country Swag called the song a "reminder to be happy with all that you do have and to not worry about what you don’t". Isabella Mitchell of Raised Rowdy referred to the track as a "catchy, upbeat and positive song that you can’t help but dance to". Complete Country described the song as a 'gift', saying it is a "great reminder to seek out moments that make us genuinely happy". Front Porch Music labelled the track a "down home song" and a "great message to live for life as opposed to living for work". Mallory Arbour of Countrytown favourably reviewed the song, stating it is a "song to get you through this Friday".

== Accolades ==
| Year | Award | Category | Result | Ref |
|---|---|---|---|---|
| 2021 | CCMA | Video of the Year | Won | |
| 2022 | Juno Awards | Single of the Year | Nominated | |
| 2022 | CCMA | Single Of The Year | Nominated | |

== Commercial performance ==
"Make a Life, Not a Living" debuted as the most downloaded song on all-formats on Canadian radio for the week ending on March 5, 2021, ahead of Maroon 5's "Beautiful Mistakes" and Justin Bieber's "Hold On". It subsequently debuted at number 36 on the Billboard Canada Country chart, and made history as the most-added song in a single week at Canadian country radio ever. One week later, it debuted at number 95 on the Canadian Hot 100. It later peaked at number 49, making it his highest charting entry there. In July 2021, "Make a Life, Not a Living" became Kissel's fourth Number One on the Canada Country chart. The song has been certified Platinum by Music Canada.

== Music video ==
The official music video for "Make a Life, Not a Living" was directed by Megan Jackson and premiered on March 19, 2021. It features Kissel, his wife Cecilia, and their three children. The video portrays Kissel ditching an office job for life on a farm. The video was named "Video of the Year" at the 2021 Canadian Country Music Awards.

== Charts ==
Chart performance for "Make a Life, Not a Living"
| Chart (2021) | Peak position |
|---|---|
| Canada (Canadian Hot 100) | 49 |
| Canada Country (Billboard) | 1 |

== Certifications ==
Certifications for "Make a Life, Not a Living"
| Region | Certification | Certified units/sales |
|---|---|---|
| Canada (Music Canada) | Platinum | 80,000^{‡} |
^{‡} Sales+streaming figures based on certification alone.
