= She Drives Me Crazy (Brett Kissel song) =

2020 song by Brett Kissel

Single by Brett Kissel

from the album Now or Never
- Released: February 1, 2020
- Genre: Country pop
- Length: 3:04 (album version): 2:46 (remix featuring Nelly)
- Label: Warner Canada; BAK 2 BAK
- Songwriters: Brett Kissel; Emma-Lee; Karen Kosowski
- Producers: Brett Kissel; Jacob Durrett

Brett Kissel singles chronology
"Drink About Me" (2019)	"She Drives Me Crazy" (2020)	"A Few Good Stories" (2020)

Music video
- "She Drives Me Crazy" on YouTube

"She Drives Me Crazy" (DND Remix)
- Cover for remix featuring Nelly

"She Drives Me Crazy" is a song co-written and recorded by Canadian country music artist Brett Kissel. It was the second single off his eighth studio album Now or Never. A remix of the track featuring rapper Nelly was previewed in November 2020, and released on June 21, 2021.

== Background ==
Kissel told The Boot that during the process of making his album Now or Never, "I [had written] "That's Country Music" and "Drink About Me," which was in the queue to be the first single, so I had a lot of powerful songs. I had "I'm Not Him, I'm Not Her," that I knew was gonna be on the album. I had "Coffee With Her." But I didn't have that uptempo pop banger, as I call it". Kissel remarked that on his way to write the song with fellow songwriters Emma-Lee and Karen Kosowski, he "was listening to pop music the whole way, just to get excited". He said after writing the song in 45 minutes, they were "feeling great about it, but it was so pop-heavy" and said "Oh my gosh, this is not a country song" and proceeded to add a major banjo riff to the song. Later that day, they wrote the track "Hummingbird" on a 1950s Gibson guitar so they "could tell the country gods that we still love country music".

== Commercial performance ==
"She Drives Me Crazy" was certified Gold by Music Canada on July 14, 2020, with over 40,000 sales or streaming equivalents, and later achieved Platinum certification on February 23, 2021. As of June 2023, the song had received over 13 million streams through Spotify.

== Music video ==
The official music video for "She Drives Me Crazy" was directed by Emma Higgins and Brett Kissel and premiered January 30, 2020. It featured a nearly all-female cast including Kissel's wife Cecilia, and their daughters Mila and Aria.

== Chart performance ==
"She Drives Me Crazy" reached a peak of number 12 on the Billboard Canada Country chart dated July 18, 2020. It also peaked at number 78 on the Billboard Canadian Hot 100, his fifth-highest-charting entry on that chart.

Chart (2020)	Peak position
Canada Hot 100 (Billboard)	78
Canada Country (Billboard)	12

== Certifications ==
Region	Certification	Certified units/sales
Canada (Music Canada)	Platinum	80,000^{‡}
^{‡} Sales+streaming figures based on certification alone.
