= Started with a Song (song) =

Single by Brett Kissel

from the album Started with a Song
- Released: June 17, 2013
- Genre: Country
- Length: 4:18
- Label: Warner Music Canada
- Songwriter(s): Brett Kissel, Craig Wiseman

Brett Kissel singles chronology
| "Started with a Song" (2013) | "Raise Your Glass" (2013) |

"Started with a Song" is a song recorded by Canadian country music artist Brett Kissel. It was released in June 2013 as the first single from his major label debut album, Started with a Song. It became the most added song at Canadian country radio in its first week, surpassing a record set by Taylor Swift's "We Are Never Ever Getting Back Together".

== Music video ==
The music video was directed by Margaret Malandruccolo and premiered in June 2013.

== Chart performance ==
"Started with a Song" debuted at number 87 on the Canadian Hot 100 for the week of July 27, 2013.

| Chart (2013) | Peak position |
|---|---|
| Canada (Canadian Hot 100) | 58 |
| Canada Country (Billboard) | 3 |

== Certifications ==
| Region | Certification | Certified units/sales |
|---|---|---|
| Canada (Music Canada) | Gold | 40,000^{‡} |
^{‡} Sales+streaming figures based on certification alone.
