= Airwaves (Brett Kissel song) =

2015 song by Brett Kissel

Single by Brett Kissel

from the album Pick Me Up
- Released: June 19, 2015
- Genre: Country
- Length: 3:29
- Label: Warner Music Canada
- Songwriters: Zach Crowell; Matt Jenkins; Jonathan Singleton
- Producer: Mickey Jack Cones

Brett Kissel singles chronology
"Something You Just Don't Forget" (2014)	"Airwaves" (2015)	"Pick Me Up" (2015)

"Airwaves" is a song recorded by Canadian country music artist Brett Kissel, released June 19, 2015 as the first single from his sixth studio album, Pick Me Up (2015). It peaked at number one on the Billboard Canada Country chart, his first chart-topper.

== Composition ==
"Airwaves" is a midtempo country song written by Zach Crowell, Matt Jenkins, and Jonathan Singleton. The song also incorporates elements of pop and rock genres. According to the digital sheet music published by Atlas Music Publishing, "Airwaves" is composed in the key of E♭ major with an approximate tempo of 114 BPM.

== Critical reception ==
Kerry Doole of New Canadian Music praised the song's production and "catchy," radio-friendly sound. In his review of Pick Me Up, Markos Papadatos of Digital Journal described the song as "infectious" and wrote that it "lures the listener in from its first note."

== Commercial performance ==
"Airwaves" entered the Billboard Canada Country airplay chart at number 31 for the week of July 6, 2015 and was the most-added single of the week. It reached the number one position on the chart dated October 3, 2015. The song also debuted at number 83 on the Billboard Canadian Hot 100 chart dated July 11, 2015, and has since peaked at number 61.

== Music video ==
The music video was directed by Ben Knechtel and premiered in July 2015.

== Chart performance ==
Chart (2015)	Peak position
Canada Hot 100 (Billboard)	61
Canada Country (Billboard)	1

== Certifications ==
Region	Certification	Certified units/sales
Canada (Music Canada)	Platinum	80,000^{‡}
^{‡} Sales+streaming figures based on certification alone.
