= ONErpm =

American music distribution service

- Parent company: Verge Records International, Inc.
- Founded: 2010; 16 years ago
- Founder: Emmanuel Zunz; Matthew Olim
- Distributor: ONErpm U.S.
- Genre: Various
- Country of origin: United States
- Location: Brooklyn; New York City, New York, U.S.
- Official website: onerpm.com

Verge Records International, Inc., doing business as ONErpm (ONE Revolution People's Music) is a music company that includes music distribution, publishing, and label services. Their label services are invite-only for artists in the more advanced stages of their careers. In 2023, they launched a subsidiary called OFFstep, specifically designed for emerging artists. For a fixed fee, artists can release their music and upload videos using OFFstep—similar to platforms like DistroKid or TuneCore.

== History ==
Founded in 2010 by Emmanuel Zunz and Matthew Olim, the company endeavored to offer such services as direct-to-fan sales, distribution to outlets like Facebook.

According to information from the site, ONErpm charges no upfront fees and gives 85% of sales to artists and labels in a nonexclusive deal, so the rights of artists are preserved and they also have an option to distribute content using Creative Commons licenses.

In 2013, ONErpm began offering a free package that includes distribution to Rdio, Grooveshark and YouTube in which artists can receive revenue generated from advertising on the video platform.

In 2023, ONErpm launched ONErpm Enterprise Solutions (a Saas platform).

In 2026, the company hired music industry veteran Mike Easterlin to run their Nashville office.

== Artists ==
The company has distributed music from artists like Metric, Wutah Kobby, Tame Impala, Amerado, Brett Kissel, Verzache, Ozomatli, Cabas, Erasmo Carlos, BNegão, Chitãozinho & Xororó, Emicida, Wendy Shay, Oseikrom Sikani, Vybz Kartel and Leoni.

In 2020, ONErpm signed a deal with 112 and Bobby Shmurda.

In 2024, Canadian band MAGIC! signed to ONErpm to release their album Inner Love Energy.

In 2025, ONErpm signed pop artist Daya (singer) and Cochise (rapper)

In 2026, ONErpm signed R&B artist Dylan Wild (singer), Sam Drysdale (singer), Myles Erlick, Dev Lemons, and Charlie Worsham.

ONErpm is home to more than 300,000 artists and has more than 5,000 YouTube channels in its MCN. ONErpm's statistics include 8 billion video plays per month, 500 million subscribers, and two billion audio streams per month. The company has 43 offices around the world, including offices in New York City, Nashville, Miami, Malaysia and São Paulo.

== Incidents ==
=== 2026 OFFstep incident ===
In July 2026, a large number of major artist channels on YouTube were compromised in which a group of hackers had reportedly used the OFFstep platform and uploaded AI-generated songs though the platform accompanied by album art which advertised an Instagram profile, as well as a link to a Discord server. Eventually, these releases were later taken down.

== See also ==
- CD Baby
