= Brett Kissel =

Canadian country singer (born 1990)

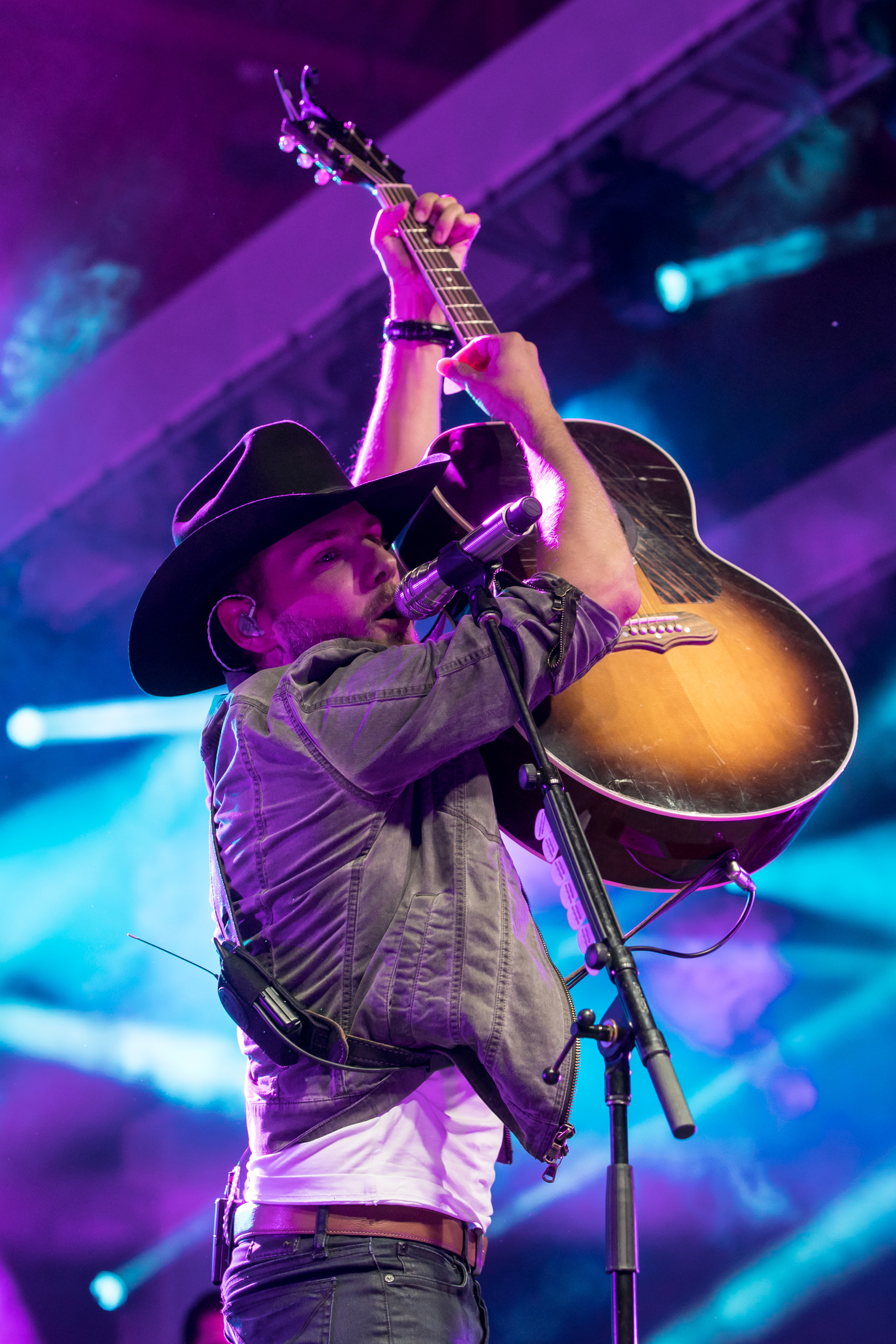
- Kissel performing at the 2017 Canada Summer Games

Background information
- Born: May 27, 1990 (age 36); St. Paul, Alberta, Canada
- Origin: Flat Lake, Alberta, Canada
- Genres: Country
- Occupation: Singer-songwriter
- Instruments: Vocals, guitar
- Years active: 2003–present
- Labels: Big Star Recordings; Verge Records; Warner Music Canada; BAK 2 BAK Entertainment Inc.
- Website: brettkissel.com

Brett Kissel (born May 27, 1990) is a Canadian country singer. He has achieved four number-one hits on the Canadian country chart with "Airwaves", "Drink About Me", "A Few Good Stories", and "Make a Life, Not a Living". Kissel has released the albums, Started with a Song (2013), Pick Me Up (2015), We Were That Song (2017), Now or Never (2020), What Is Life? (2021), The Compass Project (2023), and Let Your Horses Run – The Album (2025).

== Early life ==
Kissel was born in St. Paul, Alberta, the son of Brenda and Gordon Kissel. He has one older brother, Jamison. He grew up on a cattle ranch in northeastern Alberta's Flat Lake region, where his family operates the Wengzynowski North View cattle ranch.

== Career ==
=== 2000–2011: Early years ===
Kissel recorded his first album, Keepin' It Country, when he was 12 years old.

Kissel released three more albums, By Request in 2004, Tried and True – A Canadian Tribute in 2006 and My Roots Run Deep in 2008. In 2006, Kissel was nominated for the Chevy Trucks Rising Star Award at the Canadian Country Music Association Awards. Kissel was 16 years old at the time, making him the youngest CCMA nominee in the history of the awards show.

On May 10, 2013, Kissel signed a record deal with Warner Music Canada. His debut single, "Started with a Song", was released on June 17. It became the most added song at Canadian country radio in its first week, surpassing a Canadian country radio record set by Taylor Swift's "We Are Never Ever Getting Back Together". It debuted at number 87 on the Billboard Canadian Hot 100 for the week of July 27, 2013. The music video for the song premiered on CMT Canada on June 27. Kissel's first album for Warner, also titled Started with a Song, was released on October 1, 2013.

On February 14, 2014, Kissel released his third single from his Started with a Song album titled "3-2-1". On March 29, 2014, Kissel won his first Juno Award for Breakthrough Artist of the Year, and also performed on the 2014 Juno Awards broadcast on CTV alongside OneRepublic, Tegan and Sara, Bachman–Turner Overdrive and The Sheepdogs.

In September 2014, Kissel led all country singers with eight nominations for the Canadian Country Music Awards held in Edmonton, Alberta.

=== 2015–2018: Pick Me Up and We Were That Song ===
In September 2017 Kissel won Male Artist of the Year, Interactive Artist of the Year, Country Music Program or Special of the Year and Video of the Year for I Didn't Fall in Love With Your Hair at the 2017 Canadian Country Music Awards. He also released a new album We Were That Song on December 8, 2017. In 2018 he went on a tour across Canada to support the album.

=== 2019–2021: Now or Never, What Is Life? ===
In September 2019, Kissel released his first American country radio single "Drink About Me", the lead single from his fourth major-label album Now or Never which was released on January 1, 2020. "Drink About Me" would become Kissel's second number one on the Canada Country chart, but wouldn't find a place on the American Country Billboard chart. "She Drives Me Crazy" was released as the second single off the album in February 2020.

In September 2020, Kissel released this third single off Now or Never, "A Few Good Stories" and picked up 4 CCMA Awards, winning Male Artist of the Year, Fan's Choice, Creative Director, and Album of the Year for Now it Never. Kissel then signed his first American record deal with Verge Records, a Nashville-based partner of ONErpm. "A Few Good Stories" became Kissel's third Number One on Canada Country, "She Drives Me Crazy" became Kissel's second Platinum-certified single, and "Drink About Me" was nominated for Single of the Year at the 2021 Juno Awards.

In March 2021, Kissel released the single "Make a Life, Not a Living", and announced his fifth major-label album What Is Life?, which was released on April 9, 2021. "Make a Life, Not a Living" debuted by setting a record as the most-added song at Canadian country radio in a single week ever. It later became his fourth career Number One at Canadian country radio, and his first song to chart in the top 50 of the Billboard Canadian Hot 100. Kissel won the "Fans' Choice" award at the 2021 Canadian Country Music Awards in November 2021.

=== 2022–present: The Compass Project, Let Your Horses Run, and The Side You've Never Seen Tour ===
In 2022, he released the single "Ain't the Same" with American vocal group 98 Degrees. Along with its follow-up single "Watch It", the song was included on Kissel's studio album The Compass Project - South Album, which was released on January 27, 2023. The entire box set saw Kissel release four different albums as part of The Compass Project in 2023. The South Album also included the single "Never Have I Ever", which was released in January 2023 alongside the official announcement of the project. The East Album was released on April 28, 2023. Kissel was awarded the Queen Elizabeth II Platinum Jubilee Medal for outstanding contributions to the Province of Alberta in April 2023. In September 2023, he released the single "Two of Us" with American country artist Cooper Alan. Kissel released the West Album on November 3, 2023, and followed with the live North Album on December 1, 2023. The South Album received a nomination for Country Album of the Year at the 2024 Juno Awards.

In May 2024, Kissel released the single "Let Your Horses Run". In the fall of 2024 and early 2025, Kissel embarked on his first acoustic tour across Canada, "The Side You've Never Seen Tour". He released his fourteenth album Let Your Horses Run – The Album on February 28, 2025. The album includes the singles "Two of Us", "Let Your Horses Run", "Another One", "Cowboys & Dreamers", and "Hurtin' Songs".

In April 2026, Kissel supported Lee Brice on his "Sunriser Tour" across Canada.

== Personal life ==
Brett Kissel married Cecilia Friesen in July 2011 in Edmonton, Alberta. They lived in Nashville, Tennessee for several years. In 2016, Cecilia gave birth to their first daughter. Over the next six years, she gave birth to their second daughter, and two sons. Kissel and his family now reside on his family farm in Northern Alberta. In December 2025, it was announced that the couple would be getting a divorce and had been separated for a year and a half. In the 2025 Canadian federal election, Kissel endorsed the Conservative Party of Canada; his song, "Our Home", was the Conservative campaign theme song.

== Discography ==
- Started with a Song (2013)
- Pick Me Up (2015)
- We Were That Song (2017)
- Now or Never (2020)
- What Is Life? (2021)
- The Compass Project (2023)
- Let Your Horses Run – The Album (2025)

== Awards and nominations ==
Year	Award	Category	Result
2006	Canadian Country Music Association	Chevy Trucks Rising Star Award	Nominated
2007	Canadian Country Music Association	Chevy Trucks Rising Star Award	Nominated
2014	Juno Awards	Breakthrough Artist of the Year	Won
2014	Juno Awards	Country Album of the Year – Started with a Song	Nominated
2014	Association of Country Music in Alberta Awards	Rising Star Award	Won
2014	Association of Country Music in Alberta Awards	Single of the Year Award – "Started with a Song"	Won
2014	Canadian Country Music Association	Male Artist of the Year	Nominated
2014	Canadian Country Music Association	Album of the Year – Started with a Song	Nominated
2014	Canadian Country Music Association	Single of the Year – "Started with a Song"	Nominated
2014	Canadian Country Music Association	Songwriter of the Year – "Started with a Song"	Nominated
2014	Canadian Country Music Association	CMT Video of the Year – "3-2-1"	Won
2014	Canadian Country Music Association	Interactive Artist of the Year	Won
2015	Association of Country Music in Alberta Awards	Male Artist of the Year	Won
2015	Association of Country Music in Alberta Awards	Country Album of the Year – Started with a Song	Won
2015	Association of Country Music in Alberta Awards	Single of the Year – "3-2-1"	Won
2015	Canadian Country Music Association	Male Artist of the Year	Nominated
2015	Canadian Country Music Association	Single of the Year – "3-2-1"	Nominated
2015	Canadian Country Music Association	Video of the Year – "Tough People Do"	Nominated
2015	Canadian Country Music Association	Interactive Artist of the Year	Won
2016	Juno Awards	Country Album of the Year – Pick Me Up	Nominated
2016	Canadian Country Music Association	Male Artist of the Year	Won
2016	Canadian Country Music Association	Interactive Artist of the Year	Won
2016	Canadian Country Music Association	Fan's Choice Award	Won
2016	Canadian Country Music Association	Single of the Year – "Airwaves"	Nominated
2017	Canadian Country Music Association	Male Artist of the Year	Won
2017	Canadian Country Music Association	Single of the Year – "Cool With That"	Nominated
2017	Canadian Country Music Association	Video of the Year – "I Didn't Fall In Love With Your Hair"	Won
2017	Canadian Country Music Association	Songwriter of the Year – "Cool With That" (with Ted Hewitt, Phil O'Donnell)	Nominated
2017	Canadian Country Music Association	Interactive Artist or Group of the Year	Won
2018	Canadian Country Music Association	Male Artist of the Year	Nominated
2018	Canadian Country Music Association	Fan's Choice Award	Nominated
2018	Canadian Country Music Association	Country Album of the Year – We Were That Song	Nominated
2018	Canadian Country Music Association	Video of the Year – "We Were That Song"	Nominated
2018	Canadian Country Music Association	Interactive Artist of the Year	Won
2018	Western Canadian Music Awards	Country Artist of the Year	Nominated
2019	Juno Awards	Country Album of the Year – We Were That Song	Won
2019	Canadian Country Music Association	Entertainer of the Year	Nominated
2019	Canadian Country Music Association	Fans' Choice Award	Won
2019	Canadian Country Music Association	Interactive Artist of the Year	Nominated
2019	Canadian Country Music Association	Male Artist of the Year	Nominated
2019	Canadian Country Music Association	Songwriter of the Year – "Cecilia" (with Seth Mosley, Brad Rempel)	Nominated
2019	Western Canadian Music Awards	Country Artist of the Year	Won
2020	Canadian Country Music Association	Album Of The Year - Now Or Never	Won
2020	Canadian Country Music Association	Entertainer Of The Year	Nominated
2020	Canadian Country Music Association	Fans' Choice Award	Won
2020	Canadian Country Music Association	Male Artist Of The Year	Won
2020	Canadian Country Music Association	Video Of The Year - "Drink About Me"	Nominated
2021	Juno Awards of 2021	Single of the Year - "Drink About Me"	Nominated
2021	2021 Canadian Country Music Awards	Album of the Year - What is Life?	Nominated
2021	2021 Canadian Country Music Awards	Entertainer Of The Year	Nominated
2021	2021 Canadian Country Music Awards	Fans' Choice Award	Won
2021	2021 Canadian Country Music Awards	Male Artist Of The Year	Nominated
2021	2021 Canadian Country Music Awards	Video Of The Year - "Make a Life, Not a Living"	Won
2022	Juno Awards of 2022	Country Album of the Year - What is Life?	Won
2022	Juno Awards of 2022	Single of the Year - "Make a Life, Not a Living"	Nominated
2022	Canadian Country Music Association	Entertainer of the Year	Nominated
2022	Canadian Country Music Association	Fans' Choice	Nominated
2022	Canadian Country Music Association	Male Artist of the Year	Nominated
2022	Canadian Country Music Association	Single of the Year - "Make a Life, Not a Living"	Nominated
2023	Canadian Country Music Association	Fans' Choice	Nominated
2023	Canadian Country Music Association	Male Artist of the Year	Nominated
2024	Juno Awards	Country Album of the Year - The Compass Project - South Album	Nominated
2024	Canadian Country Music Association	Alternative Country Album of the Year - The Compass Project - West Album	Won
2024	Canadian Country Music Association	Musical Collaboration of the Year - "Two of Us" (with Cooper Alan)	Nominated
2024	Canadian Country Music Association	Video of the Year - "Two of Us" (with Cooper Alan)	Nominated
2025	Juno Awards	Country Album of the Year – The Compass Project - West Album	Nominated
2025	Canadian Country Music Association	Album of the Year - Let Your Horses Run - The Album	Nominated
2025	Canadian Country Music Association	Country Music Program or Special of the Year - A Kissel Country Christmas (with Abbey White)	Nominated
2025	Canadian Country Music Association	Fans' Choice	Nominated
2025	Canadian Country Music Association	Male Artist of the Year	Nominated
2025	Canadian Country Music Association	Single of the Year - "Let Your Horses Run"	Nominated
2025	Canadian Country Music Association	Video of the Year - "Let Your Horses Run"	Nominated
2026	Juno Awards	Country Album of the Year - Golden Child	Nominated
