= Born and Raised (song) =

2017 single by Hunter Brothers

Single by Hunter Brothers

from the album Getaway
- Released: July 26, 2017
- Genre: Country
- Length: 3:02
- Label: Open Road; Hunter Brothers
- Songwriter(s): Jim Beavers; Brad Rempel; Seth Mosley
- Producer(s): Seth Mosley; Mike "X" O'Connor

Hunter Brothers singles chronology
"Getaway" (2017)	"Born and Raised" (2017)	"Those Were the Nights" (2018)

Music video
- "Born and Raised" on YouTube

"Born and Raised" is a song recorded by Canadian country group Hunter Brothers. The song was written by Brad Rempel of High Valley with Jim Beavers and Seth Mosley. It was the fifth single off their debut album Getaway.

== Background ==
J.J. Hunter of the Hunter Brothers stated "the song is all about the things that make us proud of where we’re from. We’re honouring family, farm, faith and community; the people and things that made us who we are today".

== Critical reception ==
Nanci Dagg of Canadian Beats Media said that "if you listen to this tune with your eyes closed for a moment, you can imagine yourself looking around your own hometown with amazement and with a feeling of pride". Brittany Thompson of iHeartRadio described the song as "an anthem for small towns across the country". Top Country stated that with "Born and Raised", "the Hunter Brothers are soon to be on everyone's radars".

== Accolades ==
Year	Association	Category	Result	Ref
2018	Saskatchewan Country Music Association	Single of the Year	Nominated	
2018	SaskMusic	Single of the Year	Won	

== Commercial performance ==
"Born and Raised" reached a peak of number nine on the Billboard Canada Country chart dated January 6, 2018, marking the group's first career top ten hit. It has been certified Gold by Music Canada.

== In popular culture ==
"Born and Raised" was selected as the official anthem for the 2019 World Junior Ice Hockey Championships in Vancouver and Victoria, British Columbia through an online voting contest run by SiriusXM Canada. It defeated songs by fellow Canadian artists, The Strumbellas, Monster Truck, and The Glorious Sons.

== Music video ==
The official music video was for "Born and Raised" premiered exclusively on CBC Music on August 23, 2017, and was directed by Gavin Michael Booth. It was filmed on their family's farm in Shaunavon, Saskatchewan and used footage from a benefit concert they held there to raise money for community organizations in which approximately 12,000 people showed up to see the band.

== Charts ==
Chart (2018)	Peak position
Canada Country (Billboard)	9

== Certifications ==
Region	Certification	Certified units/sales
Canada (Music Canada)	Gold	40,000^{‡}
^{‡} Sales+streaming figures based on certification alone.
