= County Line =

A county line is the border between two counties.

County Line, County line, or County lines may also refer to:

- County Line Branch, a stream in Pennsylvania, United States
- County Line (High Valley album)
- County Line (Southern Pacific album)
- "County Line" (song)
- County Line (film)
- County Line, Alabama
- County Line, Arkansas
- County Line, Wisconsin
- County Line Baptist Church, Dudleyville, Alabama, United States
- County Line High School, Branch, Alabama, United States
- County Line station (disambiguation), stations of the name
- El Cerrito, Contra Costa County, California, formerly County Line
- County line (New Jersey), an aspect of primary election ballots in New Jersey
- County lines (drug trafficking), a form of drug trafficking in the United Kingdom

== See also ==
- County Line Bridge (disambiguation)
