= Be You =

Single by High Valley

from the album County Line
- Released: March 10, 2016
- Genre: Country
- Length: 3:08
- Label: Open Road
- Songwriter(s): Seth Mosley; Brad Rempel; Ben Stennis
- Producer(s): Seth Mosley

High Valley singles chronology
"Make You Mine" (2016)	"Be You" (2016)	"Every Week's Got a Friday" (2016)

"Be You" is a song recorded by Canadian country music group High Valley for their fourth studio album, County Line (2014). It was written by group member Brad Rempel with longtime collaborator Ben Stennis and the record's producer, Seth Mosley. "Be You" was released to Canadian country radio March 10, 2016 as the album's sixth and final single. The song also serves as the duo's final release on Open Road Recordings. It became the group's sixth consecutive top-10 single on the Canada Country chart.

== Critical reception ==
In a review of County Line, Markso Papadatos of Digital Journal called the song a "beautiful ballad." "Be You" ranked at number 48 on Alberta radio station CJOK-FM's list of "The Top 93 Songs of 2016."

== Chart performance ==
"Be You" debuted at number 42 on the Canada Country chart dated April 2, 2016. It reached a peak position of 10 on the chart dated May 28, 2016. This made it the group's sixth consecutive top-10 single, encompassing all of their releases from County Line. However, "Be You" was the first single off the album to not enter the Canadian Hot 100.

== Track listing ==
Digital download

1. "Be You" – 3:08

== Charts ==
Chart (2016)	Peak position
Canada Country (Billboard)	10

== Release history ==
Country	Date	Format	Label	Ref.
Canada	March 10, 2016	Country radio	Open Road	
Canada	April 1, 2016	Digital download	Open Road	
