= Those Were the Nights =

2018 single by Hunter Brothers

Single by Hunter Brothers

from the album Getaway
- Released: March 14, 2018
- Genre: Country pop
- Length: 3:25
- Label: Open Road; Hunter Brothers
- Songwriter(s): Jim Beavers; Brad Rempel; Lindsay Rimes

Hunter Brothers singles chronology
"Born and Raised" (2017)	"Those Were the Nights" (2018)	"Lost" (2018)

Music video
- "Those Were the Nights" on YouTube

"Those Were the Nights" is a song recorded by Canadian country group Hunter Brothers. The song was written by Brad Rempel of High Valley with Jim Beavers and Lindsay Rimes. It was the fifth single off the group's debut album Getaway.

== Background ==
Ty Hunter of the Hunter Brothers described "Those Were the Nights" as "one of those songs that takes you back in time and really helps you remember the moments that you want to reflect on, the times that were positive, the times that may have shaped you to who you are today".

== Critical reception ==
Nanci Dagg of Canadian Beats Media said that "the melody is upbeat and the brothers’ harmonies soar once again," describing the song as "a tune that will grab you then stick in your head from the moment you listen to it". Lauren Laffer of Sounds Like Nashville called the track "nostalgic," saying it "speaks to the essence of remembering where you came from and embracing the memories that will last a lifetime".

== Accolades ==
Year	Association	Category	Result	Ref
2019	Saskatchewan Country Music Association	Single of the Year	Won	
2019	Saskatchewan Country Music Association	Video of the Year	Won	

== Commercial performance ==
"Those Were the Nights" reached a peak of number nine on the Billboard Canada Country chart dated July 21, 2018, marking the group's second consecutive and second overall top ten hit. It has been certified Gold by Music Canada.

== Music video ==
The official music video was for "Those Were the Nights" premiered exclusively on Sounds Like Nashville on May 4, 2018, and was directed by Gavin Michael Booth. It was mostly filmed at the farm in which the brothers were born and raised at in Saskatchewan. The video included a scene in which they put five New Holland tractors in a circle and used them as lighting.

== Charts ==
Chart (2018)	Peak position
Canada Country (Billboard)	9

== Certifications ==
Region	Certification	Certified units/sales
Canada (Music Canada)	Gold	40,000^{‡}
^{‡} Sales+streaming figures based on certification alone.
