= Rescue You (song) =

Single by High Valley

from the album County Line
- Released: October 15, 2013
- Recorded: 2013
- Genre: Country
- Length: 2:39
- Label: Open Road; Eaglemont
- Songwriters: Brad Rempel; Ben Stennis
- Producer: Seth Mosley

High Valley singles chronology
"Trying to Believe" (2013)	"Rescue You" (2013)	"County Line" (2014)

"Rescue You" is a song recorded by Canadian country music group High Valley for their fourth studio album, County Line (2014). It is the last release by the group as a trio before Bryan Rempel departed the band in March 2014, with the rest of the album being recorded as a duo. "Rescue You" was released in Canada on October 15, 2013, through Open Road Recordings as the album's lead single. The song was written by Brad Rempel and Ben Stennis. It was their first top-10 hit on the Canada Country chart.

== Chart performance ==
"Rescue You" entered the Billboard Canadian Hot 100 at number 100 on the chart dated February 1, 2014. It reached a peak position of 80 two weeks later on the chart dated February 15, 2014. The song spent 20 weeks on the Canada Country chart, peaking at number 10 in its twelfth week on the chart dated February 8, 2014.

== Music video ==
The official music video for "Rescue You" was filmed in Watertown, Tennessee and directed by Kristen Barlowe. It premiered December 10, 2013 through SiriusXM's The Highway. Set in a forest, the video depicts a young couple "discovering true love," intercut with scenes of the trio performing.

== Track listings ==
Digital download
No.	Title	Writer(s)	Length
1.	"Rescue You"	Ben Stennis; Brad Rempel	2:39

US extended play
No.	Title	Writer(s)	Length
1.	"Let It Be Me"	Phil Barton; Jared Crump; Rempel	3:04
2.	"Rescue You"	Stennis; Rempel	2:39
3.	"Call Me Old Fashioned"	Jerry Salley; David Turnbull	3:38
4.	"Have I Told You I Love You Lately"	Rempel; Danny Wells	3:42
5.	"Dirt Rich"	Phil O'Donnell; Rempel; Jeremy Spillman	3:37
6.	"Love You for a Long Time"	Crump; Rempel; Stennis	3:01
Total length:			19:41

== Charts ==
Chart performance for "Rescue You"
Chart (2013–2014)	Peak position
Canada Hot 100 (Billboard)	80
Canada Country (Billboard)	10

== Release history ==
Release history and formats for "Rescue You"
Country	Date	Format	Label	Ref.
Canada	October 15, 2013	Digital download	Open Road	
United States	November 19, 2013	Digital extended play	Eaglemont	
