= State of Mind (Hunter Brothers album) =

Studio album by Hunter Brothers
- Released: January 25, 2019
- Genre: Country; country pop
- Length: 38:49
- Label: Open Road; Hunter Brothers
- Producer: Seth Mosley; Mike "X" O'Connor; Hunter Brothers

Hunter Brothers chronology
Getaway (2017)	State of Mind (2019)	Been a Minute (2021)

Singles from State of Mind
- 1. "Lost" Released: November 2, 2018; 2. "Northern Lights" Released: May 10, 2019; 3. "Silver Lining" Released: October 18, 2019

State of Mind is an album by Canadian country music group, the Hunter Brothers. It was released on January 25, 2019, via Open Road Recordings. It includes the #1 single "Lost", as well as "Northern Lights" and "Silver Lining". The album was nominated for Country Album of the Year at the 2020 Juno Awards.

== Singles ==
"Lost" was released as the debut single off the album in November 2018, and became their first #1 on the Canada Country chart. It was also their first charting entry on the Canadian Hot 100 at #100 and was certified Gold by Music Canada.

"Northern Lights" was released as the second single to radio in May 2019. It peaked at #16 on Canadian country radio.

"Silver Lining" was released as the third single to radio in October 2019. It peaked at #11 on Canadian country radio.

== Track listing ==
No.	Title	Writer(s)	Length
1.	"Country State of Mind"	Hunter Brothers; Niko Moon; Seth Mosley	3:33
2.	"Lost"	Cary Barlowe; Jesse Frasure; Jon Nite; Brad Rempel	2:43
3.	"Want"	Victoria Banks; Joe Ginsberg; Emily Shackelton	2:54
4.	"Silver Lining"	Mosley; Rempel; Ben Stennis	3:14
5.	"Next Year"	Hunter Brothers; Mosley; Rempel	3:26
6.	"Day Off"	Hunter Brothers; Stennis; Blake Bollinger	2:44
7.	"Train"	Mosley; Rempel; Stennis	3:34
8.	"I Still Fall"	Dave Barnes; Robyn Collins; Jordan Reynolds	3:09
9.	"Natural"	Moon; Mosley; Rempel	3:22
10.	"Lonely"	Rempel; Stennis; Pavel Dovgalyuk	3:14
11.	"Northern Lights"	Hunter Brothers; Brennin Hunt	2:56
12.	"When You Love a Girl"	Hunter Brothers; Banks	3:56
Total length:			38:49

== Charts ==
=== Album ===
Chart (2019)	Peak position
Canadian Albums (Billboard)	62

=== Singles ===
Year	Single	Peak chart positions		Certifications
Year	Single	CAN Country	CAN	Certifications
2018	"Lost"	1	100	MC: Platinum
2019	"Northern Lights"	17	—	
2019	"Silver Lining"	11	—	

== Awards and nominations ==
Year	Association	Category	Nominated work	Result	Ref.
2019	Canadian Country Music Association	Album of the Year	State of Mind	Nominated	
2019	SaskMusic Awards	Single of the Year	"Lost"	Won	
2019	SaskMusic Awards	Country Album of the Year	State of Mind	Won	
2019	SaskMusic Awards	Single of the Year	"Northern Lights"	Nominated	
2019	SaskMusic Awards	Album of the Year	State of Mind	Nominated	
2020	Juno Awards of 2020	Country Album of the Year	State of Mind	Nominated	
2020	Saskatchewan Country Music Association	Single of the Year	"Lost"	Won	
2020	Saskatchewan Country Music Association	Single of the Year	"Northern Lights"	Nominated	
2020	Saskatchewan Country Music Association	Album of the Year	State of Mind	Won	
2020	Saskatchewan Country Music Association	Video of the Year	"Silver Lining"	Nominated	
2020	Canadian Country Music Association	Video Of The Year	"Silver Lining"	Nominated	

== Release history ==
Release formats for State of Mind
Country	Date	Format	Label	Ref.
Various	January 25, 2019	Digital download	Open Road Recordings; Hunter Brothers	
Various	January 25, 2019	Streaming	Open Road Recordings; Hunter Brothers	
Various	February 1, 2019	Compact disc	Open Road Recordings; Hunter Brothers	
