= Hunter Brothers =

Canadian country music group

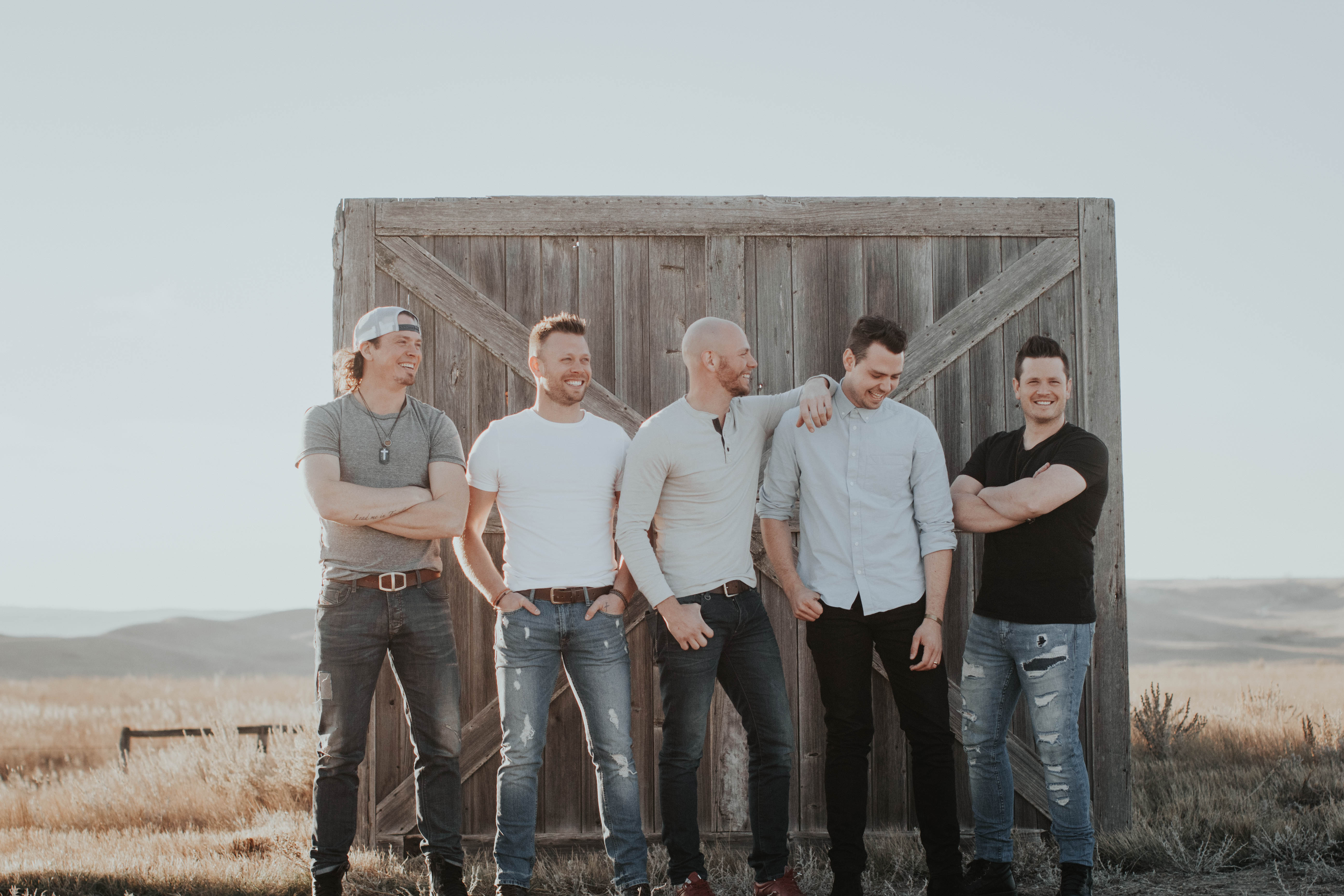

Background information
- Origin: Shaunavon, Saskatchewan, Canada
- Genres: Country; country pop
- Years active: 2016–present
- Label: Open Road
- Members: Luke Hunter; J.J. Hunter; Ty Hunter; Brock Hunter; Dusty Hunter
- Website: www.hunterbrothers.com

Hunter Brothers is a Canadian country music group from Shaunavon, Saskatchewan, composed of brothers Luke, J.J., Ty, Brock, and Dusty Hunter. They signed with Open Road Recordings and released their debut single, "El Dorado", in February 2016. It debuted on the Billboard Canada Country chart in March 2016. The band earned their first Top 10 single at Canadian country radio with their hit "Born and Raised". In 2019, their single "Lost" became their first #1 hit.

== Personal life ==
The Hunter Brothers are a Canadian country band consisting of 5 brothers from Shaunavon, Saskatchewan: Luke, J.J., Ty, Brock, and Dusty. Their parents are Lorne and Norma Hunter, and their uncle Jim Hunter is a former Canadian Olympic skier.

These brothers grew up farming in the Canadian prairies. They spent their summers singing in churches across the country. In the Winter, they were heavily involved in the hockey community. Some of the brothers even played for some major league teams.

When the 5 brothers are at home working on the farm, they often pass the time in the field by re-writing well known songs with words that are relevant to farming culture, performing them over their CB radios. They often share these songs online through their various social media platforms.

== Hockey careers ==
Four of the five brothers played junior ice hockey and three played in the professional minor leagues. J.J., Dustin, and Luke each played forward, while Brock and Ty were defencemen. Ty played rep hockey before suffering a broken femur. The remaining four brothers all sustained injuries of various kinds and returned home to continue farming with their parents on their family's 20,000 acre farm.

J.J. Hunter played three seasons in Western Hockey League with the Kelowna Rockets and Prince Albert Raiders; he attended six NHL training camps (1999 Detroit Red Wings, 2001–2006 Edmonton Oilers) and was under contract with the Edmonton Oilers for 5 seasons playing NHL pre-season games and five years in their farm system. Altogether, he played 6 years of pro-hockey including parts of six seasons in the American Hockey League with the Hamilton Bulldogs, Toronto Roadrunners, Edmonton Road Runners, Toronto Marlies, and Manitoba Moose; and parts of four season in the ECHL with the Toledo Storm and Columbus Cottonmouths.

Dustin Hunter played junior hockey with the Melville Millionaires in the Saskatchewan Junior Hockey League, then one professional season split between the Oklahoma City Blazers and San Angelo Saints in the Central Hockey League before his career was abruptly ended due to a severe eye injury.

Luke Hunter played five seasons in the WHL with the Swift Current Broncos, and one season each with the Wichita Thunder in the CHL, and the University of Calgary Dinos men's ice hockey team in the CIS. His career also came to a halt due to an eye injury.

Brock Hunter played junior hockey in the AJHL with the Drumheller Dragons, and the Fort McMurray Oil Barons before finishing up his career with the Kindersley Klippers in the SJHL.

All the brothers joined forces together when they returned home to play for the same hometown hockey team, the Shaunavon Badgers in the WMHL.

== Music career ==
=== Early years ===
When they were younger, they spent their time mirroring music videos from other artists, and learning to become performers. The Hunter Brothers quickly became known for their harmonies and stage presence.

=== 2016–2018: Getaway ===
In 2016, the brothers started recording a collection of songs with their label Open Road Recordings. On February 5, 2016 they released their debut single "El Dorado" to country radio which helped put this new band on the map within the Canadian country music industry. "El Dorado" was co-produced by Brad Rempel of Canadian country band High Valley along with Seth Mosley and Mike "X" O'Connor

"El Dorado" debuted on the Billboard Canada Country charts in March 2016, and reach number 24 on the chart.

In the spring of 2017, the Hunter Brothers released their debut album Getaway. This album included two singles that earned them their first two songs that entered the top 10 on the Billboard charts: "Born and Raised", and "Those Were the Nights".

Their single "Born and Raised" from their Getaway album was selected as the official anthem for the 2018 IIHF World Junior Hockey Tournament. "Born and Raised" also won Saskatchewan Music Award for Single of the Year.

After the release of "El Dorado", the Hunter Brothers were nominated for four Saskatchewan Country Music Association Awards, and won for both Group of the Year, and Emerging Artist categories.

=== 2019–present: State of Mind and Been a Minute ===
In January 2019, they released their sophomore album State of Mind. The record showcases the brothers' talent and growth. The first single from the record "Lost" has been certified Gold in Canada and became their first #1 single at Canadian Country Radio. "Lost" was also awarded Single of the Year at the 2019 Saskatchewan Music Awards. The album also included the singles, "Northern Lights" and "Silver Lining".

In 2019, their album State of Mind was the number one selling country album in Canada for four consecutive weeks and has had over 10 million streams worldwide. Earlier in 2019, the Hunter Brothers joined country superstars Paul Brandt, Jess Moskaluke and High Valley for The Journey Tour on 26 dates across Canada. They debuted at CMA Fest in Nashville, and also landed three CCMA Award nominations. The band was nominated for 2 JUNO Awards in 2020 for Country Album of the Year for their sophomore album State of Mind and Breakthrough Group of the Year.

On June 30, 2021, they released their third studio album Been a Minute, which included the singles "Hard Dirt" and "Been a Minute".

On May 12, 2023, the Hunter Brothers released the extended play Burning Down the Barn, which they supported with the aptly-named "Burning Down the Barn Tour" across Canada in the fall of 2023.

== Tours ==
- Burning Down the Barn Tour (2023)

== Discography ==
=== Studio albums ===
Title	Details	Peak positions
Title	Details	CAN
Getaway	Release date: March 3, 2017; Label: Open Road	—
State of Mind	Release date: January 25, 2019; Label: Open Road	62
Been a Minute	Release date: June 30, 2021; Label: Open Road	—
"—" denotes a recording that did not chart.

=== Extended plays ===
Title	Details
Burning Down the Barn	Release date: May 12, 2023; Label: Open Road
All Kinds of Country	Release date: November 7, 2025; Label: Open Road

=== Singles ===
Year	Title	Peak positions		Certifications	Album
Year	Title	CAN	CAN Country	Certifications	Album
2016	"El Dorado"	—	25		Getaway
2016	"Long Way to Love You"	—	40		Getaway
2017	"Getaway"	—	31		Getaway
2017	"Born and Raised"	—	9	MC: Gold	Getaway
2018	"Those Were the Nights"	—	9	MC: Gold	Getaway
2018	"Lost"	100	1	MC: Platinum	State of Mind
2019	"Northern Lights"	—	17		State of Mind
2019	"Silver Lining"	—	11		State of Mind
2020	"Hard Dirt"	—	17		Been a Minute
2021	"Been a Minute"	—	12		Been a Minute
2021	"Diamonds"	—	40		Been a Minute
2022	"Peace, Love & Country Music"	—	41		Burning Down the Barn
2022	"What Colour You Drive"	—	38		Burning Down the Barn
2023	"Burning Down the Barn"	—	46		Burning Down the Barn
2024	"Train (Station Edition)"	—	44		TBA
2025	"Better Days" (with Shantaia)	—	51		TBA
"—" denotes a recording that did not chart.

=== Other charted songs ===
Year	Single	Peak positions	Album
Year	Single	CAN Country	Album
2017	"Joy to the World"	46	Non-album single

=== Music videos ===
Year	Video	Director
2017	"Getaway"	The Edde Brothers
2017	"Born and Raised"	Gavin Michael Booth
2018	"Those Were the Nights"	Gavin Michael Booth
2018	"Lost"	Ben Knechtel
2019	"Northern Lights"	The Edde Brothers
2019	"Silver Lining"	The Edde Brothers
2020	"Hard Dirt"	Sean Smith
2021	"Been a Minute"	Sean Smith
2022	"Peace, Love & Country Music"	Sean Smith
2022	"What Colour You Drive"	Adler Irwin
2023	"Country State of Mind"	Adler Irwin
2023	"Burning Down the Barn"	Adler Irwin

== Awards and nominations ==
Year	Association	Category	Result	Ref
2017	Canadian Country Music Association	Interactive Artist of the Year	Nominated	
2017	Saskatchewan Country Music Association	Group of the Year	Won	
2017	Saskatchewan Country Music Association	Emerging Artist Award	Won	
2017	Saskatchewan Country Music Association	Fans’ Choice Entertainer of the Year	Nominated	
2017	Saskatchewan Country Music Association	Single of the Year - "El Dorado"	Nominated	
2018	Canadian Country Music Association	Group or Duo of the Year	Nominated	
2018	Canadian Country Music Association	Rising Star Award	Nominated	
2018	Canadian Country Music Association	Interactive Artist of the Year	Nominated	
2018	Saskatchewan Country Music Association	Single of the Year - "Born and Raised"	Nominated	
2018	SaskMusic	Single of the Year	Won	
2019	Canadian Country Music Association	Album of the Year - State of Mind	Nominated	
2019	Canadian Country Music Association	Fans' Choice Award	Nominated	
2019	Canadian Country Music Association	Group or Duo of the Year	Nominated	
2019	Saskatchewan Country Music Association	Group of the Year	Won	
2019	Saskatchewan Country Music Association	Single of the Year - "Those Were The Nights"	Won	
2019	Saskatchewan Country Music Association	Video of the Year - "Those Were The Nights"	Won	
2019	Saskatchewan Country Music Association	Interactive Group of the Year	Won	
2019	Saskatchewan Country Music Association	Fans’ Choice Entertainer of the Year	Nominated	
2019	SaskMusic Awards	Single of the Year - "Lost	Won	
2019	SaskMusic Awards	Country Album of the Year - State of Mind	Won	
2019	SaskMusic Awards	Single of the Year - "Northern Lights"	Nominated	
2019	SaskMusic Awards	Album of the Year - State of Mind	Nominated	
2019	Western Canadian Music Awards	Country Artist of the Year	Nominated	
2020	Juno Awards	Breakthrough Group of the Year	Nominated	
2020	Juno Awards	Country Album of the Year - State of Mind	Nominated	
2020	Saskatchewan Country Music Association	Fans’ Choice Entertainer of the Year	Won	
2020	Saskatchewan Country Music Association	Group/Duo of the Year	Won	
2020	Saskatchewan Country Music Association	Single of the Year - "Lost"	Won	
2020	Saskatchewan Country Music Association	Single of the Year - "Northern Lights"	Nominated	
2020	Saskatchewan Country Music Association	Album of the Year - State of Mind	Won	
2020	Saskatchewan Country Music Association	Video of the Year - "Silver Lining"	Nominated	
2020	Saskatchewan Country Music Association	Interactive Artist or Group of the Year	Nominated	
2020	Canadian Country Music Association	Fans’ Choice Award	Nominated	
2020	Canadian Country Music Association	Group Or Duo Of The Year	Nominated	
2020	Canadian Country Music Association	Video Of The Year - "Silver Lining"	Nominated	
2020	Western Canadian Music Awards	Country Artist of the Year	Nominated	
2021	Western Canadian Music Awards	Country Artist of the Year	Nominated	
2021	2021 Canadian Country Music Awards	Group or Duo of the Year	Nominated	
2021	2021 Canadian Country Music Awards	Video of the Year - "Hard Dirt"	Nominated	
2023	2023 Canadian Country Music Awards	Group or Duo of the Year	Nominated	
2023	2023 Canadian Country Music Awards	Innovative Campaign of the Year - "What Colour You Drive" Content and Fan Contest	Nominated	
2024	Canadian Country Music Association	Group or Duo of the Year	Nominated	
