= Lost (Hunter Brothers song) =

Hunter Brothers song

Single by Hunter Brothers

from the album State of Mind
- Released: November 2, 2018
- Genre: Country
- Length: 2:42
- Label: Open Road; Hunter Brothers
- Songwriters: Brad Rempel; Cary Barlowe; Jesse Frasure; Jon Nite

Hunter Brothers singles chronology
"Those Were the Nights" (2018)	"Lost" (2018)	"Northern Lights" (2019)

Music video
- "Lost" on YouTube

"Lost" is a song recorded by Canadian country music group Hunter Brothers. It was the lead single off their second studio album State of Mind. The track was co-written by Brad Rempel, Cary Barlowe, Jesse Frasure, and Jon Nite. It became the group’s first #1 hit on the Billboard Canada Country chart, and was awarded Single of the Year at the 2019 Saskatchewan Music Awards.

== Critical reception ==
Nanci Dagg of Canadian Beats Media said the track "has an upbeat melody and delightful lyrics – the kind you want to dance to and sing along with, no matter where you are when you’re listening to it" and a "love song that catches you right from the get-go, wants you to get lost in the presence of someone new in your life. It’s an unanticipated excitement that you feel when you do and these brothers have captured that in this song." Cashbox Canada wrote that the song is "an upbeat, addictive track that captivates the listener" with "the brothers’ brilliantly-synched harmonies".

== Commercial performance ==
"Lost" reached a peak of number 1 on the Billboard Canada Country chart dated April 13, 2019, marking the brothers' first chart-topper. It also peaked at number 100 on the Billboard Canadian Hot 100 and was their first charting entry there. The song was the most-spun Canadian song on country radio in Canada in 2019, according to Mediabase. "Lost" was certified Gold by Music Canada on November 22, 2019, with over 40,000 sales. On October 18, 2023, "Lost" became the group's first Platinum-certified single. As of December 2023, the song had received over 6.3 million streams through Spotify.

== Music video ==
The official music video for "Lost" was directed by Ben Knechtel and premiered November 2, 2018.

== Chart performance ==
Chart (2019)	Peak position
Canada Hot 100 (Billboard)	100
Canada Country (Billboard)	1

== Certifications ==
Region	Certification	Certified units/sales
Canada (Music Canada)	Platinum	80,000^{‡}
^{‡} Sales+streaming figures based on certification alone.
