= High Valley (album) =

Studio album by High Valley
- Released: September 14, 2010
- Genre: Country
- Length: 41:30
- Labels: Open Road; Centricity
- Producers: Paul Brandt; Sean Neff

High Valley chronology
Hands in the Dirt (2008)	High Valley (2010)	Love Is a Long Road (2012)

Singles from High Valley
- 1. "I Will Stand by You" Released: February 21, 2010; 2. "On the Combine" Released: August 2, 2010; 3. "A Father's Love (The Only Way He Knew How)" Released: January 24, 2011; 4. "Call Me Old Fashioned" Released: June 27, 2011

High Valley is the second studio album by Canadian country music group High Valley. It was released on September 14, 2010 by Open Road Recordings in Canada and by Centricity Music in the United States. Included are the singles "I Will Stand by You," "On the Combine," "A Father's Love (The Only Way He Knew How)" and "Call Me Old Fashioned." "A Father's Love (The Only Way He Knew How)" was originally recorded by Bucky Covington on his 2010 EP, I'm Alright, and released as a single in March 2010. The Judds released a cover of "I Will Stand by You" in October 2010.

High Valley was nominated for Country Album of the Year at the 2012 Juno Awards.

== Track listing ==
No.	Title	Writer(s)	Length
1.	"I Will Stand by You"	Steven Lee Olsen, Robert Ellis Orrall	3:44
2.	"On the Combine"	Paul Brandt, Brad Rempel	4:34
3.	"You'll Find Your Way"	Neal Coty, Jon Henderson	3:49
4.	"Somebody Like Me"	Michael Boggs, Neil Thrasher	4:14
5.	"A Father's Love (The Only Way He Knew How)"	Liz Hengber, Thom Shepherd, Steve Williams	3:33
6.	"When You Call My Name"	Brandt	3:41
7.	"My Way Back"	Tony Martin, Thrasher	3:44
8.	"Call Me Old Fashioned"	Jerry Salley, David Turnbull	3:38
9.	"Exactly What I Didn't Want to Happen"	Whitney Duncan, Richard Fagan, Danny Wells	3:04
10.	"Plastic Jesus"	Catt Gravitt, James LeBlanc	3:49
11.	"The Last Thing You Do"	Ashley Gorley, Wade Kirby	3:40
Total length:			41:30

== Personnel ==
=== High Valley ===
- Brad Rempel - vocals
- Bryan Rempel - vocals
- Curtis Rempel - vocals

=== Additional musicians ===
- Tim Akers - piano
- Steve Brewster - drums
- J.T. Corenflos - electric guitar
- Chad Cromwell - drums
- Dan Dugmore - dobro, lap steel guitar, pedal steel guitar
- The Eaglemont Family Singers - choir, handclapping, stomping
- Shannon Forrest - drums

- Kenny Greenberg - electric guitar
- John "Chank" Jeansonne - harmonica
- Mike Johnson - pedal steel guitar
- Steve King - Hammond B-3 organ, piano, synthesizer
- Pat McGrath - acoustic guitar
- Justin Meeks - drums
- Sean Neff - cowbell, acoustic guitar, electric guitar, percussion, synthesizer strings

- Michael Rhodes - bass guitar
- Ben Shive - Hammond B-3 organ, piano, Wurlitzer
- Adam Shoenfeld - electric guitar
- Jimmie Lee Sloas - bass guitar
- Ilya Toshinsky - banjo, acoustic guitar, mandolin
- Travis Toy - banjo, pedal steel guitar
- Wanda Vick - fiddle, mandolin
- Jonathan Yudkin - banjo, mandolin

== Chart performance ==
=== Singles ===
Year	Single	Peak positions
Year	Single	CAN
2010	"I Will Stand by You"	—
2010	"On the Combine"	—
2011	"A Father's Love (The Only Way He Knew How)"	98
2011	"Call Me Old Fashioned"	—
"—" denotes releases that did not chart
