= Been a Minute =

2021 song by Hunter Brothers

Single by Hunter Brothers

from the album Been a Minute
- Released: March 19, 2021
- Genre: Country pop
- Length: 2:30
- Label: Open Road; Hunter Brothers
- Songwriters: Hunter Hayes; Luke Dick; Chase McGill
- Producer: Hunter Hayes

Hunter Brothers singles chronology
"Hard Dirt" (2020)	"Been a Minute" (2021)	"Diamonds" (2021)

Music video
- "Been a Minute" on YouTube

"Been a Minute" is a song recorded by Canadian country group Hunter Brothers. American singer and multi-instrumentalist Hunter Hayes produced the track, and co-wrote it with Luke Dick and Chase McGill. It is the title track and second single off the group's third studio album Been a Minute.

== Background ==
"Been a Minute" was released amidst the COVID-19 pandemic. Ty Hunter of the Hunter Brothers remarked that the group wanted to release something "that points toward a day when we can all gather to laugh together, sing together and experience the community that we have all been missing over the last year". He said "the phrase ‘it’s been a minute’ holds a lot of weight and felt more relevant than ever".

== Critical reception ==
Nanci Dagg of Canadian Beats Media called the track "inspirational", saying it "makes you want to have a positive outlook to life". Taylor Jean of Front Porch Music said the song makes you want to "roll the windows down and drive down a country road", describing it as the "perfect summer anthem for this year". Top Country referred to the track as a "fresh new single", naming it their "Pick of the Week" for July 4, 2021.

== Music video ==
The official music video was for "Been a Minute" premiered on May 18, 2021, and was filmed in rural Saskatchewan.

== Charts ==
Chart (2021)	Peak position
Canada Country (Billboard)	12
