= Hard Dirt =

2020 song by Hunter Brothers

Single by Hunter Brothers

from the album Been a Minute
- Released: June 12, 2020
- Genre: Country
- Length: 2:57
- Label: Open Road; Hunter Brothers
- Songwriter(s): Hunter Hayes; Steve Moakler; Eric Paslay
- Producer(s): Hunter Hayes

Hunter Brothers singles chronology
"Silver Lining" (2019)	"Hard Dirt" (2020)	"Been a Minute" (2021)

Music video
- "Hard Dirt" on YouTube

"Hard Dirt" is a song recorded by Canadian country group Hunter Brothers. The song was written by Hunter Hayes, Steve Moakler and Eric Paslay, while Hayes produced the track. It was the lead single off their third studio album Been a Minute.

== Background ==
Ty Hunter of the Hunter Brothers described "Hard Dirt" as a "a song that speaks to the process of enduring struggle, but also knowing that hope exists on the other side of whatever circumstances you may be going through". The band dedicated the song to frontline workers and all those affected by the COVID-19 pandemic.

== Critical reception ==
Dutch Bickell of Canadian Beats Media said the song "serves as a message of hope and signifies our collective ability to grow through challenges and adversity". Front Porch Music stated that the track "really grabs your heart strings right away and pulls you close," adding that it is "an emotional feel good song that doesn’t disappoint our ears".

== Music video ==
The official music video was for "Hard Dirt" premiered on July 16, 2020, and was directed by Sean K. Smith.

== Track listings ==
Digital download – single

1. "Hard Dirt" – 2:57

Digital download – single

1. "Hard Dirt" (string version) – 3:00

== Charts ==
"Hard Dirt" reached a peak of number 17 on the Billboard Canada Country chart dated October 10, 2020, becoming the group's seventh Top 20 hit.

Chart (2020)	Peak position
Canada Country (Billboard)	17
