= Last Call (2019 film) =

2019 film by Gavin Michael Booth

- Poster
- Directed by: Gavin Michael Booth
- Written by: Gavin Michael Booth; Daved Wilkins
- Produced by: Gavin Michael Booth; Daved Wilkins
- Starring: Daved Wilkins; Sarah Booth; Matt Maenpaa
- Cinematography: Seth Wessel-Estes
- Edited by: Gavin Michael Booth
- Music by: Adrian Ellis
- Production company: Mimetic Entertainment
- Distributed by: Mill Creek Entertainment; Mutiny Pictures
- Release dates: February 28, 2019 (Beloit International Film Festival); November 25, 2020 (United States)
- Running time: 77 minutes
- Country: Canada
- Language: English

Last Call is a 2019 Canadian drama film directed by Gavin Michael Booth and written by Booth and Daved Wilkins. The film stars Wilkins, Sarah Booth and Matt Maenpaa.

== Plot ==
A man struggling with mental health attempts to reach a suicide hotline but the call is accidentally connected to a janitor.

== Cast ==
- Daved Wilkins as Scott
- Sarah Booth as Beth
- Matt Maenpaa as Jessie
- Makenna Pickersgill as Emily

== Production ==
Principal photography of the film is a 77-minute, split-screen single take.

== Release ==
The film premiered at Beloit International Film Festival on February 28, 2019. A limited theatrical release took place on November 25, 2020, and it was released for streaming on February 23, 2021.

== Reception ==
The film has received mostly positive feedback. On review aggregator Rotten Tomatoes, 82% of the critics recommend the film based on seventeen reviews. Joel Fisher at Battle Royale With Cheese said that the film is "a realistic and heart-breaking account of a man whose life is on the line". Alan Ng at Film Threat scored the film eight out of ten. Kat Hughes at The Hollywood News said: "Last Call offers up a necessary dialogue on a topic that is all too often branded as taboo". Peter Debruge at Variety said that "there's so much dead space here, and it's unfair to ask composer Adrian Ellis to fill it all". Roger Moore at Movie Nation said that it is a "generic suicide hot-line thriller memorable for its long-take/split screen gimmick, and little else".

Sarah Booth received the 2022 ACTRA Montreal Award for Outstanding Onscreen Performance–Feminine for her performance in the film, while Gavin Michael Booth won the award for Best Director at the 2019 Portland Film Festival.
