= Flower child (disambiguation) =

Flower child is a term that refers to a hippie.

Flower child may also refer to:

== Film and television ==
- "Flower Child" (Earth 2), a television episode
- "Flower Child" (Once Upon a Time), a television episode
- "Flower Child" (The Outer Limits), a television episode
- Flower Child Coffin, the fictional protagonist of the 1973 film Coffy

== Songs ==
- "Flower Child", by Eddie Murphy from Love's Alright, 1993
- "Flower Child", by the Higgins from Real Thing, 2008
- "Flower Child", by Lenny Kravitz from Let Love Rule, 1989
- "Flower Child", by Nitty Scott, 2013
- "Flower Child", by the Reseptors, competing to represent Finland in the Eurovision Song Contest 2000
- "Flower Child", by U2 from The Complete U2, 2004

== Other uses ==
- Flower Child, a 1988 poetry collection by Uche Nduka
- Flower Child, a Thoroughbred racehorse, dam of Desert Orchid
