= She's with Me =

- Canadian single cover

Single by High Valley

from the album County Line and Dear Life
- Released: May 13, 2015
- Recorded: 2014
- Genre: Country pop
- Length: 3:07 (County Line version): 3:00 (Dear Life version)
- Label: Open Road; Warner Nashville
- Songwriter(s): Seth Mosley; Brad Rempel; Ben Stennis
- Producer(s): Seth Mosley

High Valley singles chronology
"Make You Mine" (2014)	"She's with Me" (2015)	"Come on Down" (2015)

High Valley 2017 singles chronology
"I Be U Be" (2016)	"She's with Me" (2017)	"Dear Life" (2017)

Alternate cover
- US single cover

Music video
- "She's with Me" on YouTube

"She's with Me" is a song recorded by Canadian country music duo High Valley for their fourth studio album, County Line (2014). The song was written by Seth Mosley, Brad Rempel, and Ben Stennis, and was produced by Mosley. It was released to Canadian country radio on May 13, 2015 as the album's fourth single. "She's with Me" was later included on the American track listing for the duo's fifth studio album and major-label debut, Dear Life (2016). It was released to American country radio April 17, 2017 as that album's fourth overall single and second in the United States.

Following its release, "She's with Me" achieved moderate commercial success. The song peaked at number 70 on the Canadian Hot 100 and at number six on the Canada Country chart. It was certified Platinum by Music Canada in 2018. In the United States, "She's with Me" peaked at number seven and number 11 on the Country Airplay and Hot Country Songs charts, respectively, earning the group their highest-charting single on either chart. The song later entered the Hot 100 at number 96 and peaked at 79, becoming their first entry on the chart.

== Composition ==
"She's with Me" is an uptempo, pop-leaning country song with influences of bluegrass. The song includes "catchy", hook-filled lyrics and "hand-clapped rhythms." Lyrically, the song expresses adoration for a woman the narrator feels is "out of his league."

== Release ==
The duo's record label, Open Road Recordings, announced "She's with Me" as the album's fourth single on May 13, 2015 and serviced the song to Canadian country radio that day. It was released to digital retailers worldwide the following day, on May 14, 2015. The song was re-released in the United States on October 14, 2016 through Atlantic Records and Warner Music Nashville as the second promotional single from Dear Life when that record became available for pre-order. "She's with Me" was released to American country radio on April 17, 2017.

== Chart performance ==
"She's with Me" debuted at number 100 on the Canadian Hot 100 chart dated June 27, 2015. It reached a peak position of 70 on the chart dated August 1, 2015. The song spent 20 weeks on the Canada Country chart and reached a peak of 6 on the chart dated August 15, 2015. This earned the group their third consecutive top 10 single. In September 2016, the single was certified Gold by Music Canada for sales of over 50,000 copies and in November 2018 the song was certified Platinum. Since its American release, the song has peaked at number seven on the Country Airplay chart, their highest-charting single to date. It has also peaked at number 12 on the Hot Country Songs chart and at number 79 on the Hot 100. This earned the group their first entry on the latter, after bubbling under the chart with "Make You Mine".

== Music video ==
An accompanying music video was directed by Roger Pistole and premiered June 4, 2015. The video alternates between a love story purportedly told in the past and shots of the duo performing in the present day at the household of the couple, who can be seen in a black and white photograph. "She's with Me" earned the duo their second consecutive number one on the CMT Canada music video countdown, after the video for "Make You Mine".

== Track listings ==
Digital download – single

1. "She's with Me" – 3:07

Digital download – promotional single

1. "She's with Me" – 3:00

== Charts ==
=== Weekly charts ===
Chart (2015)	Peak position
Canada (Canadian Hot 100)	70
Canada Country (Billboard)	6
Chart (2017–2018)	Peak position
US Billboard Hot 100	79
US Country Airplay (Billboard)	7
US Hot Country Songs (Billboard)	11

=== Year-end charts ===
Chart (2018)	Position
US Country Airplay (Billboard)	30
US Hot Country Songs (Billboard)	53

== Certifications and sales ==
Region	Certification	Certified units/sales
Canada (Music Canada)	Platinum	80,000^{‡}
United States (RIAA)	Gold	500,000^{‡}
^{‡} Sales+streaming figures based on certification alone.

== Release history ==
Country	Date	Format	Label	Ref.
Canada	May 13, 2015	Country radio	Open Road	
Worldwide	May 14, 2015	Digital download	High Valley; Open Road	
United States	April 17, 2017	Country radio	Warner Bros.	

Promotional release

Country	Date	Format	Label	Ref.
United States	October 14, 2016	Digital download	Atlantic; Warner Nashville	
