= Love You for a Long Time =

Love You for a Long Time may refer to:

- "Love You for a Long Time" (High Valley song), 2012
- "Love You for a Long Time" (Maggie Rogers song), 2019
