= A Single Man (disambiguation) =

A Single Man is a 2009 film directed by Tom Ford based on the novel.

A Single Man may also refer to:

- A Single Man (1929 film), a 1929 lost MGM film starring Lew Cody
- A Single Man (album), 1978, by Elton John
- A Single Man (novel), 1964, by Christopher Isherwood

== See also ==
- "Single Man" (song), 2019, by Canadian country duo High Valley
