= Classroom 6 =

- Directed by: Jonas Odenheimer
- Written by: Jonas Odenheimer
- Produced by: Adam Cobler; Devin Dygert; Lidia Karpukova; Jonas Odenheimer; Sybilla Odenheimer; Sandor Tako
- Starring: Valentina Kolaric; Mike McLaughlin; Maurice Mejia
- Cinematography: Derrick Sims
- Release dates: April 14, 2015 (Fright Nights); October 9, 2015
- Running time: 76 minutes
- Country: United States
- Language: English

Classroom 6 is a 2015 American found footage horror feature film written and directed by Jonas Odenheimer. The plot centers on a reporter who takes a TV crew into an old college building to investigate the disappearances of a professor and his student in a supposedly haunted classroom. The film is distributed by 108 Media and was released on multiple video on demand platforms including Amazon Instant, iTunes, Google Play and VUDU on October 9, 2015. Classroom 6 was featured in the 2015 Beloit International Film Festival where it was nominated for Best Feature Film.

== Production ==
The film's script was completed in September 2012 and filming took place in December of the same year. The entire film was shot in less than 48 hours spread out over three days. The budget of the film was $5,000 with costs kept down thanks to being filmed mostly in the school. It took over a year to edit the film with a final print ready in early 2014.

== Cast ==
- Valentina Kolaric as Annie Monroe
- Mike McLaughlin as Jack Dogget
- Maurice Mejia as Dan
- Vince Major as Kurt
- Victor Manso as Gaston
- Jessica Amal Rice as Amanda
- Paul Thomas Arnold as Dean Michael Keaton
- Craig Cranic as Stephen Ellis
- Matt Poe as Brent Davis

== Reception ==
Reviews tended to be negative with a consensus view that the film borrows heavily from other sources and gives away its ending in the opening scenes. Infernal Cinema stated Classroom 6 has an ending that is slightly reminiscent of REC, but it is a shame they didn’t borrow more elements from this classic earlier. Horror Cult Films gave the movie 1 star out of 5 and stated "the film is basically a checklist of what to expect from supernatural low budget type movies". Dread Central also gave it 1 star out of 5. Found Footage Critic does give a positive review saying Classroom 6 is an entertaining, interesting, and sometimes scary found footage film that builds on techniques used in the classics, while staying fresh and defining its own unique look and feel.
