= I Will Stand by You =

2010 single by High Valley

Single by High Valley

from the album High Valley
- Released: February 21, 2010
- Genre: Country
- Length: 3:44
- Label: Centricity Music; Open Road
- Songwriters: Steven Lee Olsen; Robert Ellis Orrall
- Producers: Paul Brandt; Sean Neff

High Valley singles chronology
"Back to You" (2007)	"I Will Stand by You" (2010)	"On the Combine" (2010)

"I Will Stand by You" is a song written by Steven Lee Olsen and Robert Ellis Orrall. It was recorded by Canadian country group High Valley and released as the lead single to the group's second self-titled album in early 2010. The song reached the top 20 of the Billboard Canada Country chart. The song was also recorded by American country duo The Judds and released as a single in September 2010. The song was the only single released off of the 2011 compilation album, I Will Stand by You: The Essential Collection.

== Background, reception and release ==
The original version of "I Will Stand by You" was recorded in 2009 by High Valley in preparation for their debut studio release. The song was recorded in sessions held at three studios: Fool on the Hill, Six Degrees, and The Grip. Additional material was cut that later appeared on the duo's debut studio album. Released in February 2010, "I Will Stand by You" reached number 16 on the Billboard Canada Country chart later that year. It became the duo's first major hit as recording artists. "I Will Stand by You" was released on the duo's self-titled debut studio album, which also was issued in 2010. Three additional singles would be released following the song's success: "On the Combine," "A Father's Love (The Only Way He Knew How)" and "Call Me Old Fashioned."

== Chart performance ==
Chart (2010)	Peak position
Canada Country (Billboard)	16

== Personnel ==
All credits are adapted from Discogs.

High Valley

- Brad Rempel – vocals
- Bryan Rempel – vocals
- Curtis Rempel – vocals

Additional musicians

- Shannon Forrest – drums
- Jimmie Lee Sloas – bass guitar
- Adam Shoenfeld – electric guitar
- Ilya Toshinsky – banjo, acoustic guitar, mandolin
- Travis Toy – banjo, pedal steel guitar

== The Judds version ==
"I Will Stand by You"

Single by The Judds

from the album I Will Stand by You: The Essential Collection
- Released: September 2010
- Recorded: 2010
- Genre: Country; Contemporary country
- Length: 3:26
- Label: Curb
- Songwriters: Steven Lee Olsen; Robert Ellis Orrall
- Producer: Don Potter

The Judds singles chronology
"Stuck in Love" (2000)	"I Will Stand by You" (2010)

=== Background ===
"I Will Stand by You" was recorded in 2010 in Nashville, Tennessee. The session was produced by Don Potter. Potter had previously assisted in the production of The Judds's studio releases in the 1980s. The song was recorded in promotion of the duo's 2011 compilation album release and national tour. The song was one of two new tracks featured on the compilation. The second new recording, "Back Home," was a duet with Alison Krauss. The song was recorded in a contemporary country style backed by an uptempo beat and a mix of various instruments. The song's instrumentation mostly featured acoustic guitars, banjos, and kick drums.

=== Critical reception ===
"I Will Stand by You" was received with mostly negative reception upon its release. Tara Seetharam of Country Universe was disappointed by the lead vocals performed by Wynonna Judd. "Her performance misses the mark on all accounts: she blasts her notes with so much splashy aggression that they can barely find their pitch, and her phrasing is painfully affected," she commented. In addition, Seetharam also criticized harmony vocals performed by Naomi Judd, calling them "off-key." While negatively reviewing the song's vocal performance, Seetharam called the production "kinda cool," comparing it to that of Mary Chapin Carpenter and Keith Urban.

In reviewing the duo's 2011 compilation album, Allmusic's Thom Jurek also criticized "I Will Stand by You." Jurek disliked the song's production style and compared it to that of "70's area-rock." He also believed that the production drowned harmony vocals performed by the duo.

=== Release and promotion ===
"I Will Stand by You" was released in September 2010 via Curb Records. The song marked the duo's first single release in ten years. The Judds promoted the single beginning with making an appearance on The Oprah Winfrey Show in September 2010. The duo performed the song at the end of the episode. One month later, the duo appeared on the Grand Ole Opry to promote the single, helping to raise awareness for cancer. They later appeared on Good Morning America and The Today Show to promote the single. The single also helped promote the duo's first tour in ten years entitled The Judds: The Last Encore. The tour ran for one month in the fall of 2010. "I Will Stand by You" was later released on the duo's compilation album, I Will Stand by You: The Essential Collection. The album was officially released on April 5, 2011 via Curb Record.

=== Track listing ===
CD single

- "I Will Stand by You" – 3:26
- "I Will Stand by You (Callout Hook)" – 0:10

=== Personnel ===
All credits are adapted from Discogs.

The Judds

- Naomi Judd – vocals
- Wynonna Judd – vocals

Additional musicians

- Tim Akers – keyboards, organ
- Eddie Bayers – drums
- Bob Britt – electric guitar
- Spencer Campbell – bass guitar
- Maurice Carter – background vocals
- Gordon Mote – piano, synthesizer
- Don Potter – banjo, acoustic guitar, mandolin
- Jaimee Paul Shires – background vocals
- Nir Z. – drums, percussion
