= Love Is a Long Road (album) =

Studio album by High Valley
- Released: June 12, 2012
- Genre: Country
- Length: 42:50
- Label: Open Road (Canada); Centricity (US)
- Producer: Phil O'Donnell; Jeremy Spillman

High Valley chronology
High Valley (2010)	Love Is a Long Road (2012)	County Line (2014)

Singles from Love Is a Long Road
- 1. "Have I Told You I Love You Lately" Released: February 13, 2012; 2. "Let It Be Me" Released: June 18, 2012; 3. "Love You for a Long Time" Released: September 10, 2012; 4. "Trying to Believe" Released: March 2013

Love Is a Long Road is the third studio album by Canadian country music group High Valley. It was released on June 12, 2012 by Open Road Recordings in Canada and by Centricity Music in the United States. It includes the single "Have I Told You I Love You Lately" and the group's debut US release, "Love You for a Long Time".

== Track listing ==
Love Is a Long Road track listing
No.	Title	Writer(s)	Length
1.	"Let It Be Me"	Phil Barton, Jared Crump, Brad Rempel	3:04
2.	"Love Is a Long Road"	Crump, Rempel, Fred Wilhelm	2:54
3.	"Have I Told You I Love You Lately"	Rempel, Danny Wells	3:42
4.	"Not That Long Ago"	Tim James, Phil O'Donnell, Rempel	3:51
5.	"Trying to Believe"	Travis Meadows, Rempel	3:21
6.	"Love You for a Long Time"	Crump, Rempel, Ben Stennis	3:01
7.	"Never Took Her Dancing"	Rob Crosby, Brett Jones, Allen Shamblin	4:46
8.	"Home Sweet You"	O'Donnell, Rempel, Jeremy Spillman	3:29
9.	"Right Here Beside Her"	Neal Coty, Rempel, Brian G. White	4:15
10.	"Dirt Rich"	O'Donnell, Rempel, Spillman	3:37
11.	"Porches"	O'Donnell, Rempel, Spillman	3:36
12.	"Back Half Acre"	Kelley Lovelace, Rivers Rutherford	3:14
Total length:			42:50

== Personnel ==
=== High Valley ===
- Brad Rempel – vocals
- Bryan Rempel – bass guitar, vocals
- Curtis Rempel – beat box, vocals

=== Additional musicians ===
- Tom Bukovac – electric guitar
- Kevin "Swine" Grantt – bass guitar
- Tony Harrell – accordion
- Jim Hoke – harmonica
- Josh Matheny – dobro
- Greg Morrow – drums
- Phil O'Donnell – acoustic guitar, electric guitar, percussion
- John Osborne – acoustic guitar, resonator guitar, hi-string guitar, mandolin
- Jeremy Spillman – organ, percussion, piano, synthesizer
- Bryan Sutton – banjo, acoustic guitar, mandolin
- Oran Thornton – bass guitar, acoustic guitar, baritone guitar
- John Willis – acoustic guitar

== Chart performance ==
=== Singles ===
Year	Single	Peak chart positions		
Year	Single	CAN Country	CAN	US Country Airplay
2012	"Have I Told You I Love You Lately"	—	91	—
2012	"Let It Be Me"	—	89	—
2012	"Love You for a Long Time"	13	91	56
2013	"Trying to Believe"	21	—	—
"—" denotes releases that did not chart
