= Grew Up On That =

Single by Canadian country music group High Valley

Single by High Valley

from the EP Grew Up On That
- Released: March 13, 2020
- Genre: Country
- Length: 2:52
- Label: Warner Nashville
- Songwriter(s): Brad Rempel; Ben Stennis; Jaron Boyer
- Producer(s): Seth Mosley; Mike "X" O'Connor

High Valley singles chronology
"Single Man" (2019)	"Grew Up On That" (2020)	"River's Still Running" (2020)

"Grew Up On That" is a song recorded by Canadian country music group High Valley. The track was co-written by the band's lead singer Brad Rempel with Ben Stennis and Jaron Boyer. It was the lead single and title track off their third extended play Grew Up On That.

== Critical reception ==
Carena Liptak of Taste of Country said "the lyrics of the song take fans through the bandmates' childhoods in rural Alberta, Canada, with references that are both intensely specific and universal enough to tug at the heartstrings of any listener".

== Commercial performance ==
"Grew Up On That" was certified Gold by Music Canada on October 19, 2020. As of December 2020, "Grew Up On That" had received over 22.9 million streams through Spotify. In May 2023, "Grew Up On That" achieved Platinum-certification in Canada.

== Music video ==
The official music video for "Grew Up On That" was directed by Benno Nelson and Sam Siske and premiered April 24, 2020. The video integrates films and photos from the Rempels' childhood and upbringing in La Crete, Alberta.

== Chart performance ==
"Grew Up On That" reached a peak of number 1 on the Billboard Canada Country chart dated August 15, 2020, their second chart-topper after "I Be U Be". It also peaked at number 65 on the Billboard Canadian Hot 100.

Chart (2020)	Peak position
Canada (Canadian Hot 100)	65
Canada Country (Billboard)	1
US Country Indicator (Billboard)	44

== Certifications ==
Region	Certification	Certified units/sales
Canada (Music Canada)	Platinum	80,000^{‡}
^{‡} Sales+streaming figures based on certification alone.
