= Dreamers Like Us =

Studio album by The Higgins
- Released: June 8, 2010
- Genre: Country
- Length: 28:27
- Label: Open Road

The Higgins chronology
Real Thing (2008)	Dreamers Like Us (2010)

Singles from Dreamers Like Us
- 1. "Free Like Love" Released: January 11, 2010; 2. "Dreamers Like Us" Released: May 17, 2010; 3. "Burn You Back" Released: August 30, 2010

Dreamers Like Us is a studio album by Canadian country music group The Higgins. It was released on June 8, 2010 by Open Road Recordings. The first single was "Free Like Love."

== Track listing ==
No.	Title	Writer(s)	Length
1.	"Dreamers Like Us"	Kathleen Higgins, Deric Ruttan	3:19
2.	"Free Like Love"	Kelly Archer, Casey Koesel, Justin Weaver	3:47
3.	"All Cried Out"	K. Higgins, Ron Irving, Lynda McKillip	2:43
4.	"Burn You Back"	John Higgins, K. Higgins, Bruce Wallace	3:16
5.	"Carry Me Away"	Eileen Higgins, J. Higgins, K. Higgins, Steven Lee Olsen	2:54
6.	"I Ride Alone"	Kaci Bolls, K. Higgins, Josh Rush	3:59
7.	"Yours"	K. Higgins, Liz Rose, Pam Rose	3:59
8.	"Where Does the Time Go"	K. Higgins, Byron Hill	4:30
