= Every Week's Got a Friday =

Single by High Valley

from the album Dear Life
- Released: August 26, 2016
- Recorded: 2015–16 in Nashville, TN
- Genre: Country pop
- Length: 3:08
- Label: Atlantic; Warner Nashville
- Songwriter(s): Phil Barton; Brad Rempel; Seth Mosley
- Producer(s): Seth Mosley

High Valley singles chronology
| "Be You" (2016) | "Every Week's Got a Friday" (2016) | "I Be U Be" (2017) |

"Every Week's Got a Friday" is a song recorded by Canadian country music duo High Valley for their fifth studio album and major-label debut, Dear Life (2016). It was written by group member Brad Rempel with Phil Barton and the record's producer, Seth Mosley. "Every Week's Got a Friday" was released August 8, 2016 as the Canadian lead single for the album and second released overall.

== Background and release ==
Following the success achieved with their fourth studio album, County Line (2014), High Valley signed a record deal with Atlantic Records and Warner Music Nashville in October 2015. They began recording new music for their then-forthcoming project and re-released "Make You Mine" to the United States. The song also serves as the album's lead single in that market. The duo released "Every Week's Got a Friday" to Canadian country radio and digital retailers worldwide on August 26, 2016, serving as the record's first Canadian single. While "Every Week's Got a Friday" is available as a standalone digital single in the United States, it was not included on the American track listing for Dear Life, being replaced by "Make You Mine".

== Chart performance ==
"Every Week's Got a Friday" entered the Canada Country chart at number 46 on the chart dated September 17, 2016. It rose from number 11 to its peak position of 8 on the chart dated October 29, 2016, earning the group its seventh consecutive top-10. The song did not enter the Canadian Hot 100, but did reach number 36 on the All-Format Airplay chart.

== Music video ==
The official music video for "Every Week's Got a Friday" premiered through CMT Canada on October 13, 2016. It features the duo performing an impromptu performance of the song on the roof of a hardware store, where a large crowd assembles to watch them perform and to party. The video was shot on location in Millbrook, Ontario.

== Charts ==
| Chart (2016) | Peak position |
|---|---|
| Canada Country (Billboard) | 8 |

== Release history ==
| Country | Date | Format | Label | Ref. |
|---|---|---|---|---|
| Canada | August 26, 2016 | Country radio | Warner Canada | |
| Worldwide | August 26, 2016 | Digital download | Atlantic; Warner Nashville | |
