= Sarah Booth (Canadian actress) =

Canadian actress

Sarah Booth, née Hansen is a Canadian actress. She is most noted for her role as Keri Whitman in the second season of the drama anthology series Plan B, for which she received a Canadian Screen Award nomination for Best Supporting Performance in a Drama Program or Series at the 13th Canadian Screen Awards in 2025.

Originally from Ormstown, Quebec, she had her earliest acting roles as Sarah Hansen before marrying filmmaker Gavin Michael Booth in 2012.

She appeared in her husband's films The Scarehouse and Last Call, and has appeared in the television series 19-2, 21 Thunder, Transplant, Murdoch Mysteries, Pretty Hard Cases and Three Pines.

== Selected filmography ==
Booth has appeared in over 70 on screen works, so this is Booth's most highly regarded and well known on screen roles:

2024- Keri Whitman in Plan B (TV Mini Series)

2022-Yvette Nichol in Three Pines

2021- Luda in Star Trek: Discovery

2015-Sister Olivia in Helix

2011-Rhonda in 30 vies

== Awards and nominations ==
Year	Organisation	Award	Work	Result
2014	New York City Horror Film Festival	Best Feature	The Scarehouse	Win
2015	FANtastic Horror Film Festival, San Diego	Best Actress in a Feature Film	The Scarehouse	Nominated
2018	ACTRA Award	Walter Massey Breakthrough Artist	N/A	Win
2018	Independent Shorts Awards	Best Comedy Short	Are You My Mummy	Win
2019	Artemis Women in Action Film Festival	Best Comedy	Are You My Mummy	Win
2019	CFK International Film Festival	Best Actor (Female Foreign)	Last Call	Win
2019	Hamilton Film Festival	Best Actress	Last Call	Win
2019	ACTRA Award	Outstanding Performance in a Video Game	Far Cry 5	Nominated
2022	Vancouver Island Short Film Festival	People's Choice	Are You My Mummy	Win
2024	ACTRA Award	Outstanding Performance in TV	Three Pines	Nominated
2025	Canadian Screen Awards	Best Supporting Performer, Drama	Plan B	Nominated
