= Real Thing (The Higgins album) =

Studio album by The Higgins
- Released: June 24, 2008
- Genre: Country
- Length: 41:14
- Label: Open Road
- Producer: Paul Shatto, David Wills

The Higgins chronology
Real Thing (2008)	Dreamers Like Us (2010)

Singles from Real Thing
- 1. "Flower Child" Released: March 3, 2008; 2. "Real Thing" Released: July 2008; 3. "Second Hand Car" Released: February 2, 2009

Real Thing is the debut studio album by Canadian country music group The Higgins. It was released on June 24, 2008 by Open Road. The first single, "Flower Child," was released in March 2008. "Flower Child" received the "Single of the Year", "SOCAN Song of the Year", and "Video of the Year" Awards at the 32nd Annual BCCMA Award Ceremony.

== Track listing ==
No.	Title	Writer(s)	Length
1.	"Flower Child"	Kathleen Higgins, Eileen Higgins, John Higgins, David Wills	4:12
2.	"Sounds of Summer"	K. Higgins, E. Higgins, J. Higgins	3:29
3.	"16 Going on 30"	K. Higgins, E. Higgins, Jeff Wood	4:10
4.	"Real Thing"	Chris Thorsteinson, Dave Wasyliw, Deric Ruttan	3:14
5.	"Second Hand Car"	K. Higgins, E. Higgins, Joni Delaurier	5:04
6.	"Factory Girl"	Traditional	1:42
7.	"I Got No Time (For a Little Boy)"	K. Higgins, E. Higgins, Wills	2:42
8.	"Rhythm Guitar"	Emmylou Harris, Paul Kennerley	3:05
9.	"My Way of Thinking"	K. Higgins, E. Higgins, J. Higgins, Wood	3:33
10.	"Wild Horse"	K. Higgins, E. Higgins, Wills, Ian Cameron	4:07
11.	"Hey Jamie"	K. Higgins, E. Higgins, J. Higgins, Wood	3:54
12.	"Love in One Shot"	J. Higgins, Ken Visser	2:02

== Chart performance ==
=== Singles ===
Year	Single	Peak positions
Year	Single	CAN
2008	"Flower Child"	—
2008	"Real Thing"	99
2009	"Second Hand Car"	—
"—" denotes releases that did not chart
