= Stuck in Love (song) =

Single by the Judds

from the album Big Bang Boogie
- Released: February 2000
- Genre: Country
- Length: 3:48
- Label: Curb/Mercury
- Songwriters: Kim Patton-Johnston; Gary Nicholson
- Producer: Gary Nicholson

The Judds singles chronology
| "John Deere Tractor" (1991) | "Stuck in Love" (2000) | "I Will Stand by You" (2010) |

"Stuck in Love" is a song recorded by American country music duo the Judds. It was released in February 2000 as a single from Big Bang Boogie, a bonus EP included with Wynonna Judd's 2000 album New Day Dawning. The song peaked at number 26 on the Billboard Hot Country Singles chart and reached number 16 on the RPM Country Tracks chart in Canada. The song was written by Kim Patton-Johnston and Gary Nicholson.

== Chart performance ==
| Chart (2000) | Peak position |
|---|---|
| Canada Country Singles (RPM) | 16 |
| US Hot Country Songs (Billboard) | 26 |
