= I Be U Be =

Single by High Valley

from the album Dear Life
- Released: February 27, 2017
- Recorded: 2015–16 in Nashville, TN
- Genre: Country
- Length: 3:33
- Label: Atlantic; Warner Nashville
- Songwriters: Brad Rempel; Jenson Vaughan
- Producer: Seth Mosley

High Valley singles chronology
"Every Week's Got a Friday" (2016)	"I Be U Be" (2017)	"She's with Me" (2017)

Music video
- "I Be U Be" on YouTube

"I Be U Be" is a song written by Brad Rempel and Jenson Vaughan and recorded by Canadian country music duo High Valley for their fifth studio album, Dear Life (2016). The song was first released digitally on November 11, 2016, as the fifth and final promotional single supporting the album. It was serviced to Canadian country radio on February 27, 2017, as the album's second Canadian single and third overall single. "I Be U Be" is the first single available on both regional track listings for Dear Life.

== Content ==
"I Be U Be" is a country song with influences of folk, bluegrass, and Americana. The song's lyrics describe an "ideal love" reciprocated through back-and-forth assertions of support.

== Critical reception ==
In a review of Dear Life, Matt Bjorke of Roughstock wrote that "I Be U Be" is "a song with an interesting melody and... what makes the whole song work is the band's harmonies and strong, heartfelt lyrics." Laura Hostelley of Sounds Like Nashville commended the song's "strong imagery" and wrote that the song's percussion-heavy sound "might become a signature in their career."

== Commercial performance ==
"I Be U Be" entered the Canada Country chart dated March 25, 2017 at number 38. It reached the top 10 in its sixth week on the chart, becoming the group's eighth consecutive top-10 single. The song reached the number one position on the chart dated May 27, 2017; this makes it the group's most successful radio single to date, surpassing the no. 3 peak of "Come on Down", and first number one. "I Be U Be" entered the Canadian Hot 100 chart at number 92 in the chart dated May 27, 2017. The song has been certified Gold by Music Canada.

== Music video ==
The official music video for "I Be U Be" premiered through CMT Canada on April 6, 2017.

== Charts ==
Chart (2017)	Peak position
Canada Hot 100 (Billboard)	92
Canada Country (Billboard)	1

=== Year-end charts ===
Chart (2017)	Position
Canada Country (Billboard)	39

== Certifications ==
Region	Certification	Certified units/sales
Canada (Music Canada)	Platinum	80,000^{‡}
^{‡} Sales+streaming figures based on certification alone.

== Release history ==
Country	Date	Format	Label(s)	Ref.
North America	November 11, 2016	Digital download (promotional)	Atlantic; Warner Bros.	
Canada	February 27, 2017	Country radio	Warner Nashville	
