= Plan B (2023 TV series) =

2023 Canadian time travel television series

- Genre: Science fiction
- Created by: Jean-François Asselin; Jacques Drolet
- Based on: Plan B
- Starring: Patrick J. Adams; Vinessa Antoine; Carolina Bartczak; Karine Vanasse
- Country of origin: Canada
- Original language: English
- No. of seasons: 3
- No. of episodes: 18

Production
- Production companies: KOTV Productions; Seven.One Studios

Original release
- Network: CBC
- Release: February 27, 2023 – present

Plan B is a Canadian television drama series, that premiered on CBC Television on February 27, 2023.

An adaptation of the French-language Quebec series Plan B, which premiered on Ici Radio-Canada Télé in 2017, the series is an anthology centred on a mysterious agency that allows people to travel back in time to change their lives, with each season telling a different self-contained story.

== Premise ==
The first season follows Phillip (Patrick J. Adams), a man who is offered the opportunity to go back in time to make different choices in life to salvage his relationship with his girlfriend Evelyn (Karine Vanasse) and his career after a major personal setback.

The second season follows Mia Coleman, a police officer who wants to change her actions after her intervention in a domestic dispute between Paul (Vincent Leclerc) and Keri (Sarah Booth) Whitman goes disastrously wrong. The second season of the English series is adapted from the third, rather than the second, season of the French series, and features two actors, Leclerc and Patrick Emmanuel Abellard as Mia's police partner, reprising the same roles they played in French.

The third season, adapted from the second season of the original series, stars Carolina Bartczak as Abigail Walker, a prominent television host who approaches the agency after her daughter Lucy (Arianna Shannon) commits suicide. The cast also includes Arnold Pinnock, Ennis Esmer, Jaeden Noel, Carolyn Taylor and Grace Lynn Kung. The third season premiered August 8, 2025, on CBC Gem.

== Cast and characters ==
=== Season 1 ===
- Patrick J. Adams as Phillip Grimmer (Original French: Louis Morissette as Philippe Girard)
- Karine Vanasse as Evelyn Landry (Original French: Magalie Lépine-Blondeau as Évelyne Lalonde)
- François Arnaud as Patrick Landry (Original French: Émile Proulx-Cloutier as Patrick Lalonde)
- Josh Close as Andy Tremblay (Original French: Fabien Cloutier as André Dumais)
- Troian Bellisario as Miranda Delano (Original French: Julie Le Breton as Marie Denoncourt)

=== Season 2 ===
- Vinessa Antoine as Mia Coleman (Original French: Anne-Élisabeth Bossé as Mylène Clermont)
- Vincent Leclerc as Paul Whitman (Original French: Vincent Leclerc as Bruno Bernier)
- Sarah Booth as Keri Whitman (Original French: Mélanie Pilon as Caroline Nadeau)
- Rossif Sutherland as Bryson (Original French: Pierre-Luc Brillant as Guillaume Raymond)

=== Season 3 ===
==== Main ====
- Carolina Bartczak as Abigail Walker (Original French: Sophie Lorain as Florence Morin)
- Arianna Shannon as Lucy Walker (Original French: Émi Chicoine as Marilou Morin)
- Arnold Pinnock

==== Supporting ====
- Ennis Esmer
- Jaeden Noel
- Carolyn Taylor
- Grace Lynn Kung

== Episodes ==
Season	Episodes	Originally released	
Season	Episodes	First released	Last released
1	6	February 27, 2023	April 10, 2023
2	6	August 10, 2024	
3	6	August 8, 2025	

=== Season 1 (2023) ===
No. overall	No. in season	Title	Directed by	Written by	Original release date
1	1	Episode 1	Maxime Giroux	Teleplay by : Lynne Kamm & Jean-François Asselin; Story by : Bruce Smith	February 27, 2023
2	2	Episode 2	Maxime Giroux	Teleplay by : Lynne Kamm & Jean-François Asselin; Story by : Bruce Smith	March 6, 2023
3	3	Episode 3	Aisling Chin-Yee	Lynne Kamm	March 20, 2023
4	4	Episode 4	Aisling Chin-Yee	Teleplay by : Lynne Kamm & Jean-François Asselin; Story by : Bruce Smith	March 27, 2023
5	5	Episode 5	Aisling Chin-Yee	Lynne Kamm	April 3, 2023
6	6	Episode 6	Jean-François Asselin	Teleplay by : Bruce Smith and Lynne Kamm & Jean-François Asselin & Jacques Drolet; Story by : Bruce Smith	April 10, 2023

=== Season 2 (2024) ===
The second season was released in August 2024 to the CBC's streaming platform CBC Gem, although it is slated for linear television broadcast beginning October 7.

No. overall	No. in season	Title	Directed by	Written by	Original release date
7	1	Episode 1	Jean-François Asselin	Story by : Jean-François Asselin; Teleplay by : Jean-François Asselin and Celeste Parr	August 11, 2024
8	2	Episode 2	Jean-François Asselin	Story by : Jean-François Asselin; Teleplay by : Jean-François Asselin and Celeste Parr	August 11, 2024
9	3	Episode 3	Jean-François Asselin	Story by : Jean-François Asselin; Teleplay by : Jean-François Asselin and Celeste Parr	August 11, 2024
10	4	Episode 4	Jean-François Asselin	Story by : Jean-François Asselin; Teleplay by : Jean-François Asselin and Celeste Parr	August 11, 2024
11	5	Episode 5	Jean-François Asselin	Story by : Jean-François Asselin; Teleplay by : Jean-François Asselin and Celeste Parr	August 11, 2024
12	6	Episode 6	Jean-François Asselin	Story by : Jean-François Asselin; Teleplay by : Jean-François Asselin and Celeste Parr	August 11, 2024

=== Season 3 (2025) ===
No. overall	No. in season	Title	Directed by	Written by	Original release date
13	1	Episode 1	Jean-François Asselin	Story by : Jean-François Asselin; Teleplay by : Jean-François Asselin and Celeste Parr	August 8, 2025
14	2	Episode 2	Jean-François Asselin	Story by : Jean-François Asselin; Teleplay by : Jean-François Asselin and Celeste Parr	August 8, 2025
15	3	Episode 3	Jean-François Asselin	Story by : Jean-François Asselin; Teleplay by : Jean-François Asselin and Celeste Parr	August 8, 2025
16	4	Episode 4	Jean-François Asselin	Story by : Jean-François Asselin; Teleplay by : Jean-François Asselin and Celeste Parr	August 8, 2025
17	5	Episode 5	Jean-François Asselin	Story by : Jean-François Asselin; Teleplay by : Jean-François Asselin and Celeste Parr	August 8, 2025
18	6	Episode 6	Jean-François Asselin	Story by : Jean-François Asselin; Teleplay by : Jean-François Asselin and Celeste Parr	August 8, 2025

== Production ==
=== Development ===
The series is produced by KOTV, directed by Jean-François Asselin, Aisling Chin-Yee, and Maxime Giroux. The English adaptation was written by Lynne Kamm; the co-creators of the original French-language series are Jean Francois Asselin and Jacques Drolet.

On September 22, 2023, CBC announced the second season of Plan B.

=== Casting ===
In June 2022, the casting of Patrick J. Adams and Karine Vanasse in the lead roles was announced. In August 2022, it was announced that François Arnaud, Josh Close and Troian Bellisario would be joining the cast in undisclosed roles.

== Broadcast ==
International distribution rights to the series have been acquired by Seven.One Studios through Red Arrow Studios International.

== Critical response ==
In August 2025, The Globe and Mail television critic J. Kelly Nestruck questioned why the CBC had invested money in creating a full English-language remake of the original French-language series, instead of simply distributing the original version on CBC Gem with subtitles, and investing in a new original production instead of a remake.
