= The Scarehouse =

- Film poster
- Directed by: Gavin Michael Booth
- Screenplay by: Gavin Michael Booth
- Story by: Sarah Booth; Gavin Michael Booth
- Produced by: Mike Carriere; Jeremy Shell; Rhys Trenhaile
- Starring: Sarah Booth; Kimberly-Sue Murray; Katherine Barrell
- Cinematography: Ian Macmillan
- Edited by: Gavin Michael Booth
- Music by: Adrian Ellis
- Production company: A Named Viking
- Distributed by: D Films
- Release date: October 5, 2014
- Country: Canada
- Language: English
- Budget: C$273,000

The Scarehouse is a 2014 Canadian horror film directed by Gavin Michael Booth. It stars Sarah Booth and Kimberly-Sue Murray as two women who seek revenge against their former sorority.

== Premise ==
Six sorority sisters enter a Halloween haunted house attraction, only to discover that there are two former members who seek revenge on them for past misdeeds.

== Cast ==
- Sarah Booth as Corey Peters
- Kimberly-Sue Murray as Elaina Forrester
- Katherine Barrell as Jaqueline Gill
- Jennifer Miller as Lisa Jenner
- Teagan Vincze as Shelby Hickman
- Emily Alatalo as Katrina Larson
- Dani Barker as Emily Lewis
- Ivana Stojanovic as Caitlin Bowden

== Production ==
Pre-production was announced in July 2013. Filming took place in Windsor, Ontario, in August 2013. Shooting ended after 22 days, and the film entered post-production in September 2013. All of the Haunted House scenes were filmed entirely inside a real operational haunted attraction called Scarehouse Windsor

== Release ==
The Scarehouse premiered in Windsor on 5 October 2014. It was released to video on demand 13 January 2015 in the US and Canada.

== Reception ==
Kevin Scott of Exclaim! rated it 5/10 stars and wrote that though the film is repetitive, it has "gruesome creativity" and "twisted exuberance." Trace Thurman of Bloody Disgusting rated it 1.5/5 stars and stated, "The film's biggest issue is that it thinks it's hip, cool and funny; but it is none of those things." Matt Boiselle of Dread Central rated it 3.5/5 stars and wrote, "Aside from a few off-the-map plot stretches and fizzled attempts at black comedy, The Scarehouse steps ahead of the torture-porn genre for a brief moment." Ben Bussey of Brutal as Hell opined, "Gavin Michael Booth's film is out to provide a bit more than your textbook slasher/torture movie scares – and largely succeeds in doing so." Mark L. Miller of Ain't It Cool News wrote, "Full of unexpected turns and twists, The Scarehouse is not your typical revenge film. It takes some inventive kills and some interesting plot swerves and injects two characters played by two fantastic actresses;" while Horror Society rated it 8/10 stars and stated of its use of dual female antagonists, "The Scarehouse breaks the traditional horror film mold and keeps the new experiences going, too."

The Scarehouse won Best Feature Film at the New York City Horror Film Festival.
