= Make You Mine (High Valley song) =

Single by High Valley featuring Ricky Skaggs

from the album County Line and Dear Life
- Released: December 8, 2014
- Genre: Alternative country
- Length: 3:31
- Label: Open Road; Warner Nashville
- Songwriters: Seth Mosley; Brad Rempel; Ben Stennis
- Producer: Seth Mosley

High Valley singles chronology
"County Line" (2014)	"Make You Mine" (2014)	"She's with Me" (2015)

High Valley 2016 singles chronology
"Come on Down" (2015)	"Make You Mine" (2016)	"Be You" (2016)

Ricky Skaggs singles chronology
"Forever's Not Long Enough" (2014)	"Make You Mine" (2014)

Music video
- "Make You Mine" on YouTube

"Make You Mine" is a song recorded by Canadian country music duo High Valley for their fourth studio album, County Line (2014). It was written by group member Brad Rempel along with Ben Stennis and the record's producer, Seth Mosley, and features Ricky Skaggs. (Note: Skaggs is only credited as a featured artist on the initial Canadian release.) "Make You Mine" was first released in Canada in December 2014 through Open Road Recordings as the third single off County Line. After High Valley signed to Atlantic Records / Warner Music Nashville in 2015, they re-released the single through that label on February 26, 2016. The song serves as the lead single for their debut major-label album, Dear Life (2016).

The song has been the group's most commercially successful, reaching a career-high peak of 58 on the Canadian Hot 100 in addition to becoming a top 5 hit on the Canada Country airplay chart and being certified Gold by Music Canada. It is the group's second entry on the Billboard Country Airplay chart, and is their first on Hot Country Songs.

== Critical reception ==
"Make You Mine" was selected as a critic's pick by Taste of Country and given a positive review by Billy Dukes. "One could argue the picture this duo paints is too familiar," writes Dukes, "But their arrangement makes this an urgent listen. It's fun that touches your soul, and that is very rare on country radio."

== Commercial performance ==
"Make You Mine" was the second most-downloaded song in Canada and the "most active indie", being the independent single with the most combined sales and streaming, for the week of December 8–15, 2014 according to DMDS. The song debuted and peaked at number 39 on the Billboard Hot Canadian Digital Songs chart dated March 21, 2015. It debuted at number 94 on the Billboard Canadian Hot 100 on the chart dated February 7, 2015 and reached its peak position of 58 in its seventh week on the chart dated March 21, 2015. "Make You Mine" spent 22 weeks on the Canada Country airplay chart and reached a peak position of 5. Music Canada certified the single Gold in April 2016 and Platinum in June 2019.

In the United States, "Make You Mine" debuted at number 59 on the Billboard Country Airplay chart dated March 5, 2016. It entered the top 40 of the chart in its ninth week and has since peaked at number 21 on the chart dated December 3, 2016. "Make You Mine" debuted at number 49 on the Hot Country Songs chart dated July 16, 2016 - their first entry on the chart. It has reached a peak position of 21 on that chart. As of March 2017, the song has sold 237,000 copies in the US. "Make You Mine" debuted at number 8 on the Bubbling Under Hot 100 Singles chart dated January 14, 2017. "Make You Mine" was certified Gold by the Recording Industry Association of America on June 28, 2018.

== Music video ==
The accompanying music video for "Make You Mine" was directed by Kristin Barlowe and premiered January 29, 2015 through CMT Canada.

== Track listing ==
Digital download – single

1. "Make You Mine" – 3:31

== Charts ==
=== Weekly charts ===
Chart (2014–2017)	Peak position
Canada (Canadian Hot 100)	58
Canada Country (Billboard)	5
US Bubbling Under Hot 100 (Billboard)	8
US Country Airplay (Billboard)	17
US Hot Country Songs (Billboard)	21

=== Year-end charts ===
Chart (2015)	Position
Canada Country (Billboard)	25
Chart (2016)	Position
US Hot Country Songs (Billboard)	93
Chart (2017)	Position
US Hot Country Songs (Billboard)	77

== Certifications and sales ==
Region	Certification	Certified units/sales
Canada (Music Canada)	Platinum	80,000^{‡}
United States (RIAA)	Gold	237,000
^{‡} Sales+streaming figures based on certification alone.

== Release history ==
Country	Date	Format	Label	Ref.
Canada	December 8, 2014	Country radio	Open Road	(Note: Release date inferred from song's debut sales frame falling on week of December 15, 2014 and tendency for labels to release new singles to radio on Mondays.)
Europe	December 2, 2015	Digital download	Warner Nashville	
Oceania	December 2, 2015	Digital download	Warner Nashville	
United States	February 26, 2016	Digital download	Warner Nashville	
United States	February 29, 2016	Country radio	Atlantic; Warner Nashville	
