= Dear Life (High Valley song) =

Single by High Valley

from the album Dear Life
- Released: July 17, 2017
- Genre: Country
- Length: 3:14
- Label: Atlantic; Warner Nashville
- Songwriters: Brad Rempel; Seth Mosley; Ben Stennis
- Producers: Seth Mosley; Mike "X" O'Connor

High Valley singles chronology
"She's with Me" (2017)	"Dear Life" (2017)	"Young Forever" (2018)

"Dear Life" is a song recorded by Canadian country music duo High Valley for their fifth studio album of the same name (2016). Group member Brad Rempel co-wrote the song with Seth Mosley and Ben Stennis, while Mosley co-produced the track with Mike "X" O'Connor. The song was first released digitally as the second promotional single on October 28, 2016, and was later released to Canadian country radio July 17, 2017 as the album's third Canadian single and fifth overall single.

== Composition ==
"Dear Life" is a Bluegrass-inspired song that features a "percussive" chorus and acoustic verses. The song's lyrics address making choices as one grows up and was inspired by the duo's kids. Drums feature prominently in the song's instrumentation, and "Dear Life"'s production has been compared to Avicii's "Hey Brother", which combines elements of country music with electronic dance music.

== Chart performance ==
"Dear Life" peaked at number five on the Canada Country chart, earning the group their ninth consecutive top-10 single.

Chart (2017)	Peak position
Canada Country (Billboard)	5

== Certification ==
Region	Certification	Certified units/sales
Canada (Music Canada)	Platinum	80,000^{‡}
^{‡} Sales+streaming figures based on certification alone.

== Release history ==
Country	Date	Format	Label	Ref.
North America	October 28, 2016	Digital download	Atlantic; Warner Nashville	
Canada	July 17, 2017	Country radio	Warner Nashville	
