= A Father's Love =

A Father's Love may refer to:

- A Father's Love (French: L'Ogre), a 1973 novel by Jacques Chessex
- "A Father's Love (The Only Way He Knew How)", a 2010 single by Bucky Covington
- "A Father's Love", a 2005 episode of the British TV series Casualty
- "A Father's Love", a 2013 episode of the American TV series New Girl
