= County Line station =

County Line station may refer to:

- County Line station (NHSL), a SEPTA Norristown High Speed Line station in Radnor Township, Pennsylvania
- County Line station (RTD), an RTD commuter rail station in Lone Tree, Colorado
- County Line station (SEPTA Regional Rail), in Upper Southampton Township, Pennsylvania

== See also ==
- County Line (disambiguation)
