= Gavin Michael Booth =

Canadian filmmaker and music video director

- Born: 29 November 1987 (age 37); Amherstburg, Essex County, Ontario, Canada
- Occupations: Film director; screenwriter; film editor; film producer; music video director
- Years active: 2004–present
- Notable work: Last Call; The Scarehouse
- Spouse: Sarah Booth (m. 2012)
- Awards: List of Awards
- Website: gavinmichaelbooth.com

Gavin Michael Booth (born 29 November 1987) is a Canadian filmmaker and music video director known for the films Last Call and The Scarehouse.

== Career ==
Early in his career, Booth produced short films and music videos, including the music videos for The Afters' "Light Up the Sky" and Hunter Brothers' "Those Were the Nights." He worked with SYML and Third Eye Blind before working with Blumhouse Productions on a film titled Fifteen, the first horror film broadcast live on Periscope and Twitter.

Booth later produced The Scarehouse with Universal Pictures and Last Call, a single take split-screen film. For the latter film, Booth won the award for Best Director at the 2019 Portland Film Festival. In 2023, he was named an Honorary Chairperson for that year's Beloit International Film Festival. He is currently in development on his next film, Sydney vs. Sean, which will star Janel Parrish (who will also serve as producer) and T. R. Knight.

== Personal life ==
In 2012, Booth married Sarah Booth, who starred in the lead role of his film Last Call.

== Filmography ==
Year	Title	Director	Writer	Producer	Editor	Notes
2005	Leaving Town	Yes	Yes	Yes	Yes	Co-directed, co-produced, co-wrote and co-edited with Michael Drouillard
2006	Do Not Disturb	Yes	Yes	Yes	Yes	Co-directed and co-edited with Navin Ramaswaran; also co-cinematographer
2007	A Most Useless Place	Yes	Yes	Yes	Yes	Also cinematographer
2011	Silent but Deadly	No	No	Yes	No	Associate producer
2014	The Scarehouse	Yes	Yes	Yes	Yes	
2015	Fifteen	Yes	Yes	Yes	No	Short film produced by Jason Blum
2019	Last Call	Yes	co-writer	Yes	Yes	
TBA	Sydney vs. Sean †	Yes	No	Yes	Yes	

Key
†	Denotes film or TV productions that have not yet been released

== Awards ==
Event	Year	Award	Title	Result	Ref.
New York City Horror Film Festival	2014	Best Feature	The Scarehouse	Won	
Portland Film Festival	2019	Best Director	Last Call	Won	
