= County Line (song) =

2014 song by High Valley

Single by High Valley

from the album County Line
- Released: August 12, 2014
- Studio: Full Circle Studio in Franklin, TN
- Genre: Country pop
- Length: 2:43
- Label: Open Road
- Songwriter(s): Seth Mosley; Brad Rempel; Ben Stennis
- Producer(s): Seth Mosley

High Valley singles chronology
"Rescue You" (2013)	"County Line" (2014)	"Make You Mine" (2014)

"County Line" is a song recorded by Canadian country music duo High Valley for their fourth studio album of the same name (2014). It was released August 12, 2014 as the album's second single and their first release as a duo. The song was written by Seth Mosley, Brad Rempel, and Ben Stennis and was produced by Mosley. In January 2016, the single was certified Gold by Music Canada, marking the first single of the group's career to earn this distinction.

== Background ==
In March 2014, founding member Bryan Rempel parted with the group in order to focus on his family. Now recording as a duo, High Valley soon began working on new music. They played demos for their fans to gain input on which songs should make the album and opted to release "County Line" as the de facto lead single (and second released overall) due to positive reception. According to Verb News, the song "sets the tone for the rest of the album" with its more progressive, pop-influenced sound.

== Chart performance ==
"County Line" debuted at number 98 on the Canadian Hot 100 chart dated September 13, 2014. Initially spending only two weeks on the chart, the song later re-entered at a new high of 85 on the chart dated October 11, 2014. It reached a peak position of 70 on the chart dated November 1, 2014. On country radio, "County Line" was at the time the fastest charting song of High Valley's career, hitting the Canada Country top 20 in its second week. The song peaked on that chart at number 8 in November 2014.

== Music video ==
An accompanying video for the song depicts small-town life and premiered through CMT Canada on September 12, 2014. It was directed by Kristin Barlowe, who also worked on the video for the group's previous single, "Rescue You". The video was uploaded to High Valley's official YouTube channel on September 19, 2014.

== Charts ==
Chart (2014)	Peak position
Canada (Canadian Hot 100)	70
Canada Country (Billboard)	8

== Certifications and sales ==
Region	Certification	Certified units/sales
Canada (Music Canada)	Gold	40,000^{*}
^{*} Sales figures based on certification alone.
