= Single Man (song) =

2019 song by Canadian country music group High Valley

Single by High Valley
- Released: April 3, 2019
- Genre: Country
- Length: 3:26
- Label: Atlantic; Warner Nashville
- Songwriter(s): Brad Rempel; Jordan Schmidt; Derrick Southerland
- Producer(s): Seth Mosley; Mike "X" O'Connor

High Valley singles chronology
"Young Forever" (2018)	"Single Man" (2019)	"Grew Up On That" (2020)

Music video
- "Single Man" on YouTube

"Single Man" is a song recorded by Canadian country group High Valley. The song was written by the group's frontman Brad Rempel along with Jordan Schmidt and Derrick Southerland.

== Background ==
Both Rempel brothers of High Valley are married and have kids with their wives, and they elected to use a play-on-words with the sing title. Rather than singing about being a "single man", the song is the narrator singing about how they don't know a single man who wouldn't want what he has. Brad Rempel, who co-wrote the track, said he "loved how it talked about how sometimes, being single looks amazing but it never can beat what we have at home with our family".

== Critical reception ==
Billy Dukes of Taste of Country said the song "feels like something you'd keep time with around the campfire", adding that High Valley "[doubles] down on the foot-stomping, rootsy sound they've softly been introducing to mainstream country music crowds in the United States. Nicole Bochinis of NY Country Swag called the track "upbeat", saying "the future is looking very bright" for the group.

== Commercial performance ==
"Single Man" reached a peak of number two on the Billboard Canada Country chart, marking the group's sixth top five hit. It also peaked at number 81 on the Billboard Canadian Hot 100, their highest charting entry there since "Come On Down" in 2015. The track was certified Platinum by Music Canada.

== Music video ==
The official music video for "Single Man" was filmed on a ranch outside Nashville, Tennessee, and features a man doing his best to be a good husband and father. It was directed by Sean Hagwell and premiered on May 1, 2019.

== Track listings ==
Digital download – single

1. "Single Man" – 3:26

Digital download – single

1. "Single Man" (acoustic version) – 3:19

Digital download – single

1. "Single Man" (bluegrass version) – 3:51

== Charts ==
Chart performance for "Single Man"
Chart (2019)	Peak position
Canada (Canadian Hot 100)	81
Canada Country (Billboard)	2

== Certifications ==
Certifications for "Single Man"
Region	Certification	Certified units/sales
Canada (Music Canada)	Platinum	80,000^{‡}
^{‡} Sales+streaming figures based on certification alone.
