= Grew Up On That (EP) =

EP by High Valley
- Released: May 8, 2020
- Genre: Country
- Length: 19:24
- Label: Warner Nashville
- Producer: Seth Mosley (all tracks); Mike "X" O'Connor (all tracks); Daniel Tashian (track 6)

High Valley chronology
Farmhouse Sessions (2018)	Grew Up On That (2020)	Way Back (2022)

Singles from Grew Up On That
- 1. "Grew Up On That" Released: March 13, 2020; 2. "River's Still Running" Released: October 23, 2020

Grew Up On That is the third extended play by Canadian country music group High Valley. It was released on May 8, 2020 through Warner Nashville. It includes the singles "Grew Up On That" and "River's Still Running".

== Track listing ==
Adapted from Spotify.
No.	Title	Writer(s)	Length
1.	"Grew Up On That"	Brad Rempel; Jaron Boyer; Ben Stennis	2:52
2.	"Your Mama"	Tyler Hubbard; Josh Miller; Troy Verges; Ben West	3:44
3.	"River's Still Running"	Rempel; Corey Crowder; Randy Montana	3:09
4.	"Northern Star"	Rempel; Stennis; Matt Rogers	2:42
5.	"One Day You'll Get It"	Rempel; West; Derrick Southerland	3:38
6.	"Show Me the Way"	Rempel; Tenille Nadkrynechny; Daniel Tashian	3:17
Total length:			19:24

== Charts ==
=== Singles ===
Year	Single	Peak chart positions			Certifications
Year	Single	CAN	CAN Country	US Country Indicator	Certifications
2020	"Grew Up On That"	65	1	44	MC: Platinum
2020	"River's Still Running"	79	1	—	MC: Gold

== Release history ==
Release formats for Grew Up On That
Country	Date	Format	Label	Ref.
Various	May 8, 2020	Compact disc	Warner Music Nashville	
Various	May 8, 2020	Digital download	Warner Music Nashville	
Various	May 8, 2020	Streaming	Warner Music Nashville	
