= The Higgins =

Canadian country band

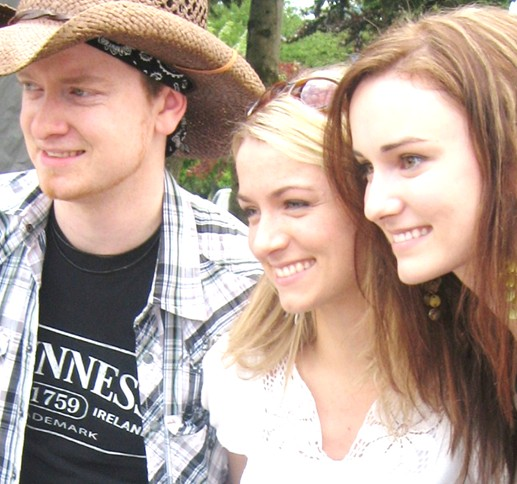
- John, Eileen, and Kathleen Higgins, June 14, 2008, Vancouver, Canada

Background information
- Origin: Delta, British Columbia, Canada
- Genres: Country
- Years active: 1998–present
- Label: Open Road
- Members: John Higgins; Eileen Higgins; Kathleen Higgins
- Past members: Mary Higgins; James Higgins
- Website: www.higginsmusic.com

The Higgins are a Canadian country music group from Delta, British Columbia. The Higgins comprise three siblings: John (born June 4, 1982), Eileen (born July 17, 1986), and Kathleen Higgins (born November 11, 1988). They have charted three singles on the Canadian Country Music charts, two of which were Top 15. Videos for "Flower Child", "Real Thing", and "Second Hand Car" all went to No. 3 on CMT's Chevy Cross Canada Countdown.

The Higgins are songwriters as well as musicians, having written or co-written nine tracks on their national debut album Real Thing. The Higgins were nominated for CCMA Group of the Year in 2008 and 2009, and have won six BCCMA awards including Album of the Year and Group of the Year (2008).

The group is best known for its vocal harmonies, and character onstage. The Higgins combine their country roots, pop influences and a Celtic family background into "their unique musical sound".

== Members ==
- John Higgins – Vocals, Acoustic and Electric Guitars
- Eileen Higgins – Vocals, Mandolin, Tin whistle
- Kathleen Higgins – Vocals, Acoustic guitar

== History ==
The Higgins grew up in Delta, British Columbia, as three of seven siblings in their Irish/Hungarian family. They began singing as young children, performing in local musicals and schools. They developed as musicians, matured as individuals, and committed their lives perfecting their music. The band's earliest incarnation included younger brother James, on drums, and their sister Mary on vocals. Mary left the group in 2005, in order to pursue other interests.

The Higgins musical influences come from Emmylou Harris, Fleetwood Mac, the Dixie Chicks, The Corrs, James Taylor, Celtic, deep South traditional forms of folk, blues, and country. They write, arrange and accompany themselves on a variety of both modern and traditional songs.

In 1998, John broke his back in a workplace accident, when a forklift crushed him in a bottle-recycling plant. It made him a wheelchair user for almost a year. Formerly a basketball hopeful, the 16-year-old had to find something else to do. A friend lent him a battered, acoustic, steel-string guitar while he was in his wheelchair, and he and his sisters taught each other to play.

John later became a spokesperson for WorkSafeBC, an organization dedicated to workplace safety. The Higgins performed at the WorkSafeBC 50th Anniversary, in June 2008.

=== Personal life ===
Just before their Canadian debut album, Real Thing, was released in June 2008, two of The Higgins had weddings. John was married in April, his new wife travelling with the group, working behind the scenes. Eileen married in May 2008, though her new husband generally stays home while The Higgins go on tour.

== Awards and honours ==
In September 2006, they were honored with their own star on the Merritt Mountain Music Festival's Walk of Stars, in Merritt, British Columbia, Canada. Each year the town features a giant festival of the country music industry's top performers. Past performers include Reba McEntire and Carrie Underwood.

In November 2006, The Higgins were invited to represent Canada at the Guangdong International Tourism & Cultural Festival in China. For a week, they performed in places such as the 60,000 seat capacity Tian-He Stadium, and the Sun Yat-Sen Memorial Hall, in Guangzhou, China.

In 2007, The Higgins were nominated again with the BCCMA's, in 3 categories: Entertainer of The Year, Group/Duo of The Year, and the Gaylord Wood Memorial Award for traditional country performers.

The Higgins "Flower Child" video was nominated in April 2008, for a LEO Award in the "Best Best Music Video" Category. In September 2008, The Higgins presented at the 2008 Canadian Country Music Association Awards Show. Eileen Higgins took home a CCMA All-Star Band Award (Special Instrument Category – Mandolin), from the event. The Higgins were also nominated as CCMA Band/Duo of The Year, which later went to the songwriters of their hit single "Real Thing" : Deric Ruttan, Chris Thorsteinson and Dave Wasyliw (both of Country Group Doc Walker).

In October 2008, The Higgins won 6 BCCMA Awards : Album of the Year (Real Thing), Group of the Year, Single of the Year ("Flower Child"), SOCAN Song of the Year ("Flower Child"), Video of the Year (Stephano Barberis for "Flower Child"), and Roots/Canadiana Group of the Year.

2008 also brought The Higgins as nominations for a CRMA, and an Indie Award.

In July 2009, The Higgins were nominated for 3 Canadian Country Music Associations (CCMA) Awards: Group/Duo of the Year, Roots Artist of the Year, and Eileen, for Special Instrument (Mandolin). Their album Real Thing was also nominated for a 2009 Western Canadian Music Award, (Country Album of the Year).

== Media ==
The Higgins performed at the 4th Annual Merritt Walk of Stars Gala, in June 2007, aired on CMT. This was their third year in a row they've performed at the ceremonies.

In 2006, the group made a music video (of their song "Hey Jamie"), for the CBC Television show Make Some Noise. Other media appearances for 2006 included, CBC, Global TV, CityTV, CMT, CFJC-TV7.

In February 2008, The Higgins released their first music video for "Flower Child", directed by award-winning director Stephano Barberis to CMT Canada. It peaked at No. 3 on the network's Chevy Cross Canada Countdown in June 2008. Their videos for "Real Thing" (in 2008), and "Second Hand Car" (in 2009) were also directed by Barberis, and both reached No. 3 on the countdown.

== Discography ==
=== Studio albums ===
Title	Details
Coming Home for Christmas	Release date: October 27, 2003; Label: self-released
Wild Minds	Release date: October 4, 2004; Label: self-released
The Higgins	Release date: April 13, 2007; Label: self-released
Real Thing	Release date: June 24, 2008; Label: Open Road Recordings
Dreamers Like Us	Release date: June 8, 2010; Label: Open Road Recordings

=== Singles ===
Year	Single	Peak positions	Album
Year	Single	CAN	Album
2008	"Flower Child"	—	Real Thing
2008	"Real Thing"	99	Real Thing
2009	"Second Hand Car"	—	Real Thing
2010	"Free Like Love"	—	Dreamers Like Us
2010	"Dreamers Like Us"	—	Dreamers Like Us
2010	"Burn You Back"	—	Dreamers Like Us
"—" denotes releases that did not chart

=== Music videos ===
Year	Video	Director
2008	"Flower Child"	Stephano Barberis
2008	"Real Thing"	Stephano Barberis
2009	"Second Hand Car"	Stephano Barberis
2010	"Free Like Love"	Stephano Barberis

== Awards and nominations ==
Year	Association	Category	Result
2008	Canadian Country Music Association	Group or Duo of the Year	Nominated
2009	Canadian Country Music Association	Group or Duo of the Year	Nominated
2009	Canadian Country Music Association	Roots Artist or Group of the Year	Nominated
2010	Canadian Country Music Association	Group or Duo of the Year	Nominated
2010	Canadian Country Music Association	Roots Artist or Group of the Year	Nominated
