= Dear Life (album) =

Studio album by High Valley
- Released: November 18, 2016
- Recorded: 2014–16 in Nashville, Tennessee
- Genre: Country
- Length: 36:12 (US edition)
- Labels: Atlantic; Warner Nashville
- Producers: Seth Mosley; Mike "X" O'Connor

High Valley chronology
County Line (2014)	Dear Life (2016)	Farmhouse Sessions (2018)

Singles from Dear Life
- 1. "Make You Mine" Released: February 26, 2016; 2. "Every Week's Got a Friday" Released: August 26, 2016; 3. "I Be U Be" Released: February 27, 2017; 4. "She's with Me" Released: April 17, 2017; 5. "Dear Life" Released: July 2017; 6. "Young Forever" Released: January 2018

Dear Life is the fifth studio album by Canadian country music duo High Valley and the group's debut major-label release. It was released on November 18, 2016 through Atlantic Records and Warner Music Nashville. The American track listing for the album features two tracks from the duo's previous album, County Line (2014), in place of two of the newly recorded songs, notably removing the Canadian lead single, "Every Week's Got a Friday" in favour of "Make You Mine".

== Background ==
Following the departure of founding member Bryan Rempel in March 2014, High Valley returned as a duo and released their fourth studio album, County Line in October of that year. They experienced a commercial breakthrough with the record, landing six consecutive singles in the top 10 on Canadian country radio from 2014 through 2016 and earning three Gold-certified singles from Music Canada. In October 2015, High Valley signed a record deal with Atlantic Records and Warner Music Nashville. They soon began working on new music for their major-label debut, and had recorded seven of the songs that would make the album's final track listing by May 2016.

The title, cover, and release date of Dear Life were revealed on October 3, 2016. The album was made available for pre-order on October 14. In support of pre-orders, one new promotional track was released to digital retailers weekly from October 14 through the release date of November 18, 2016.

== Reception ==
The album debuted on the Canadian Albums chart at No. 36, and Billboard's Top Country Albums album at No. 37. It sold 2,300 copies in the US in the first week, and with an additional 800 copies in the second week. The album has sold 12,000 copies in the US as of March 2017.

== Singles ==
"Make You Mine" was re-issued in the United States on February 26, 2016 as their debut major-label single and lead single from Dear Life in that country. It was serviced to radio on February 29, 2016. The song debuted at number 59 on the Billboard Country Airplay chart in March 2016 and reached a peak position of 17 in March 2017. It is also their first entry on the magazine's Hot Country Songs chart, where it has peaked at number 21. "Make You Mine" was first released in Canada in December 2014, serving as the third single from previous album, County Line, and reached peaks of 5 and 58, respectively, on the Canada Country and Canadian Hot 100 charts.

In Canada, "Every Week's Got a Friday" was released August 26, 2016 as the album's lead single. It has since reached 8 on the Canada Country chart.

"I Be U Be" was serviced to Canadian country radio on February 27, 2017 as the second single in Canada and third overall.

"She's with Me", previously the top-10 follow-up to "Make You Mine" from County Line in 2015, impacted American country radio on April 17, 2017 as the album's fourth single and second in the United States.

The title track, "Dear Life", was released in July 2017 as the third Canadian single and fifth release overall.

"Young Forever" was serviced to Canadian country radio as the fourth and final Canadian single, and sixth overall release from the album, in January 2018.

=== Other songs ===
"Young Forever" was released in both countries as the first promotional single from the album on September 9, 2016. It is also featured on the soundtrack to the sports video game, Madden NFL 17.

"Long Way Home" was made available as an instant-grat track to Canadian digital retailers on October 14, 2016 when the album was made available for pre-orders. In the US, "She's with Me" was made available instead. "Dear Life", "Memory Makin'", and "I Be U Be" followed suit on October 28, November 4, and November 11, respectively.

== Track listing ==
Dear Life (Canadian edition)
No.	Title	Writer(s)	Length
1.	"Dear Life"	Brad Rempel; Seth Mosley; Ben Stennis	3:14
2.	"I Ain't Changin'"	Rempel; Mosley; Jessi Alexander	3:12
3.	"Long Way Home"	Oliver Lundström; Rempel; Mosley; Johan Åsgärde	3:03
4.	"Memory Makin'"	Rempel; Mosley; Stennis	2:39
5.	"I Be U Be"	Rempel; Jenson Vaughan	3:33
6.	"Roads We've Never Taken"	Rempel; Tom Douglas; Jaren Johnston	3:17
7.	"Don't Stop"	Rempel; Mosley; Stennis	3:36
8.	"The Only"	Jon Nite; Ross Copperman; Nicolle Galyon	3:07
9.	"Every Week's Got a Friday"	Phil Barton; Rempel; Mosley	3:08
10.	"Soldier"	Josh O'Keefe, Marli Harwood, Michael Angelo	3:23
11.	"Young Forever"	Rempel; Mosley; Stennis	3:40

Dear Life (American edition)
No.	Title	Writer(s)	Length
1.	"She's with Me"	Rempel; Mosley; Stennis	3:00
2.	"Dear Life"	Rempel; Mosley; Stennis	3:14
3.	"I Ain't Changin'"	Rempel; Mosley; Alexander	3:12
4.	"Make You Mine"	Rempel; Mosley; Stennis	3:31
5.	"Don't Stop"	Rempel; Mosley; Stennis	3:36
6.	"The Only"	Nite; Copperman; Galyon	3:07
7.	"Roads We've Never Taken"	Rempel; Douglas; Johnston	3:17
8.	"I Be U Be"	Rempel; Vaughan	3:33
9.	"Memory Makin'"	Rempel; Mosley; Stennis	2:39
10.	"Soldier"	O'Keefe, Marli Harwood, Michael Angelo	3:23
11.	"Young Forever"	Rempel; Mosley; Stennis	3:40
Total length:			36:12

== Personnel ==
Credits are adapted from liner notes of Dear Life.

High Valley

- Brad Rempel – Lead vocals, guitar
- Curtis Rempel – Vocals, mandolin, guitar

Musicians

- Drums – Nick Buda, Shannon Forrest, Miles McPherson, Ben Phillips, Nir Z.
- Bass – Joeie Canaday, Tony Lucido, Steve Mackey, Mike "X" O'Connor, Jimmie Lee Sloas
- Guitar – Mike "X" O'Connor, Raymond Klassen, Tom Bukovac, Chris LaCorte, Troy Lancaster, Dan Macal, Rob McNelley, Seth Mosley, Mike Payne, Keith Sewell, Ilya Toshinsky, Derek Wells
- Programming – Mike "X" O'Connor, Seth Mosley
- Dobro – Raymond Klassen, Josh Matheny

- Keyboards – Tim Lauer
- Cello – Carole Rabinowitz
- Viola – Kristin Wilkinson
- Violin – David Davidson, David Angel
- Orchestrations – David Davidson
- Background vocals – Seth Mosley, Ty Hutner, Dusty Hunter, Jerricho Scroggins, Asa Wiggins, Ally Smith, Luke Brown, Jordan Phillips, Ben Stennis, Adam Stark, Dave Myers, Patrick Donahoe

Production

- Production – Seth Mosley, Mike "X" O'Connor
- Recording – Mike "X" O'Connor, Jerricho Scroggins
  - Recorded at Castle Recording Studio, Dark Horse Recording, Full Circle Music, Portofino Island Resort, Beachy Keen, Little Big Sound (strings)
- String engineer – Bobby Shin
  - Assistant string recording – Jerricho Scroggins

- Mixing – Mike "X" O'Connor, Jerricho Scroggins, Sean Moffit (strings)
  - Additional mixing – Tom Coyne, Mark Endert, F. Reid Shippen
- Digital editing – Michael Sanders, Andy Selby, Nick Schwarz, Asa Wiggins, Mike "X" O'Connor, Jerricho Scroggins
  - Additional editing – Michael Sanders, Dave Hagen
- Mastering – Tom Coyne, Randy Merrill

Design

- Creative direction – Shane Tarleton
- Art direction & design – Mike Moore
- Photography – Robby Klein

- Styling – Kim Perrett
- Grooming – Libby Barnes

== Chart performance ==
Chart performance for Dear Life
Chart (2016)	Peak position
Canadian Albums (Billboard)	36
US Top Country Albums (Billboard)	37
US Heatseekers Albums (Billboard)	3

== Certifications ==
Region	Certification	Certified units/sales
Canada (Music Canada)	Gold	40,000^{‡}
^{‡} Sales+streaming figures based on certification alone.
