= River's Still Running =

Single by Canadian country music group High Valley

Single by High Valley

from the EP Grew Up On That
- Released: October 23, 2020
- Genre: Country
- Length: 3:09
- Label: Warner Nashville; Atlantic; Blue Chair
- Songwriter(s): Brad Rempel; Corey Crowder; Randy Montana
- Producer(s): Seth Mosley; Mike "X" O'Connor

High Valley singles chronology
"Grew Up On That" (2020)	"River's Still Running" (2020)	"Whatever It Takes" (2021)

Music video
- "River's Still Running" on YouTube

"River's Still Running" is a song recorded by Canadian country group High Valley. The song was written by the band's frontman Brad Rempel with Corey Crowder and Randy Montana. It was the second single off their extended play Grew Up On That.

== Background ==
Brad Rempel wrote the song with Corey Crowder and Randy Montana, shortly after Montana had scored a six-week Number One with Luke Combs' "Beer Never Broke My Heart". They wanted to write a "super positive song that your average country bumpkin could identify with, that was from a very backwoods, small town".

== Critical reception ==
Complete Country described the song positively, saying it "reminder to remain positive and appreciate the little things in life, like the sun rising and the river running" adding the "lyrics are spot on".

== Music video ==
The official music video for "River's Still Running" premiered on January 22, 2021. It features both Brad and Curtis Rempel of High Valley.

== Chart performance ==
"River's Still Running" reached a peak of number 1 on the Billboard Canada Country chart dated April 17, 2021, their third chart-topper, and second consecutive after "Grew Up On That". It also peaked at number 64 on the Billboard Canadian Hot 100.

Chart (2021)	Peak position
Canada (Canadian Hot 100)	64
Canada Country (Billboard)	1

== Certifications ==
Region	Certification	Certified units/sales
Canada (Music Canada)	Gold	40,000^{‡}
^{‡} Sales+streaming figures based on certification alone.
