= Love You for a Long Time (High Valley song) =

Single by High Valley

from the album Love Is a Long Road
- Released: September 10, 2012
- Genre: Country pop; bluegrass
- Length: 3:01
- Label: Open Road; Eaglemont; Rodeowave
- Songwriters: Jared Crump; Brad Rempel; Ben Stennis
- Producers: Phil O'Donnell; Jeremy Spillman

High Valley singles chronology
"Let It Be Me" (2012)	"Love You for a Long Time" (2012)	"Trying to Believe" (2013)

Music video
- "Love You for a Long Time" on YouTube

"Love You for a Long Time" is a song recorded by Canadian country music trio High Valley for their third studio album, Love Is a Long Road (2012). It was written by lead vocalist Brad Rempel along with Jared Crump and Ben Stennis. The song was released to Canadian country radio through Open Road Recordings in September 2012 as the album's third single.

In the United States, "Love You for a Long Time" serves as the group's debut single and was promoted to American country radio on September 10, 2012 through Eaglemont Entertainment and Rodeowave Entertainment. It was released to digital retailers in October 2012 and was later officially re-released as part of High Valley's Rescue You extended play in 2013.

The song was a modest hit, charting at 91 on the Billboard Canadian Hot 100 and reaching 13 on the Canada Country airplay chart. It was also their first entry on the US country charts, peaking at 56 on the Country Airplay survey.

== Critical reception ==
Billy Dukes of Taste of Country rated the song three-and-a-half stars out of five in a positive review complimenting the group's harmonies and professionalism. "The lyrics won't knock you down," writes Dukes, "but it's a song one won't mind hearing every three to four hours on country radio... If High Valley can keep turning out pure and honest love stories like 'Love You for a Long Time,' they'll build a fan base quickly."

== Music video ==
The accompanying music video for "Love You for a Long Time" was directed by Mark Maryanovich and Carolyne Stossel and premiered through CMT on November 12, 2012. It was uploaded to the group's official YouTube channel on November 16, 2012. Shot in the desert outside of Palm Springs, California, the video plays on the contrast between its barren desert setting and a more colourful backdrop to demonstrate the highs and lows of relationships.

== Chart performance ==
Chart performance for "Love You for a Long Time"
Chart (2012–2013)	Peak position
Canada Hot 100 (Billboard)	91
Canada Country (Billboard)	13
US Country Airplay (Billboard)	56

== Release history ==
Release history and formats for "Love You for a Long Time"
Country	Date	Format	Label	Ref.
Canada	September 10, 2012	Country radio	Open Road	
United States	September 10, 2012	Country radio	Eaglemont; Rodeowave	
United States	October 2012	Digital download	Eaglemont	
