= County Line (High Valley album) =

Studio album by High Valley
- Released: October 14, 2014
- Genre: Country
- Length: 32:11
- Label: Open Road
- Producer: Seth Mosley

High Valley chronology
Love Is a Long Road (2012)	County Line (2014)	Dear Life (2016)

Singles from County Line
- 1. "Rescue You" Released: October 15, 2013; 2. "County Line" Released: August 12, 2014; 3. "Make You Mine" Released: December 8, 2014; 4. "She's with Me" Released: May 13, 2015; 5. "Come on Down" Released: September 29, 2015; 6. "Be You" Released: March 10, 2016

County Line is the fourth studio album by Canadian country music group High Valley. It was released on October 14, 2014 by Open Road Recordings. The record is their first to be released as a duo, following the departure of Bryan Rempel. It includes the top-10 country radio singles "Rescue You", "County Line", "Make You Mine", "She's with Me", "Come on Down" and "Be You".

== Critical reception ==
Markos Papadatos of Digital Journal gave the album four and a half stars out of five, writing that "Brothers Brad and Curtis Rempel are exceptional on this new album. They soar on harmonies where the listener can recall Rascal Flatts and Diamond Rio." Shenieka Russell-Metcalf of Top Country wrote that "Brad and Curtis didn't miss a beat with this 10 track album. They have a great mix of content, great harmonies and strong lyrical content."

== Track listing ==
No.	Title	Writer(s)	Length
1.	"County Line"	Seth Mosley, Brad Rempel, Ben Stennis	3:29
2.	"Make You Mine" (featuring Ricky Skaggs)	Mosley, Rempel, Stennis	3:31
3.	"Be You"	Mosley, Rempel, Stennis	3:07
4.	"Fathers and Sons"	Blake Bollinger, Travis Meadows, Rempel	3:04
5.	"Farm Girl"	Jim Beavers, Rempel, Deric Ruttan	3:09
6.	"Why God Made a River"	Mosley, Don Poythress, Rempel	2:58
7.	"She's with Me"	Mosley, Rempel, Stennis	3:07
8.	"Come on Down"	Jared Crump, Rempel, Fred Wilhelm	3:22
9.	"While the Gettin's Good"	Dave Berg, Deanna Bryant, Tommy Lee James	3:49
10.	"Rescue You"	Rempel, Stennis	2:35
Total length:			32:11

== Chart performance ==
=== Singles ===
Year	Single	Peak chart positions	
Year	Single	CAN Country	CAN
2013	"Rescue You"	10	80
2014	"County Line"	8	70
2014	"Make You Mine"	5	58
2015	"She's with Me"	6	70
2015	"Come on Down"	3	77
2016	"Be You"	10	—
"—" denotes releases that did not chart
