= County Line Bridge =

County Line Bridge may refer to:

- County Line Bridge (Morristown, Indiana), listed on the National Register of Historic Places (NRHP) in Rush County and Hancock County
- County Line Bridge (Columbus Junction, Iowa), NRHP-listed in Washington County and in Louisa County
- County Line Bowstring, between Cloud and Republic counties, near Hollis and Wayne, Kansas, NRHP-listed
- County Line Bridge (Cherry County, Nebraska), spanning Niobrara River, NRHP-listed in eastern Cherry County
- EJP County Line Bridge, Hyattville, Wyoming, NRHP-listed

== See also ==
- Rush County Bridge No. 188, Otis, Kansas, NRHP-listed in Rush County
