= Come On Down (High Valley song) =

"Come on Down"

Single by High Valley

from the album County Line
- Released: September 29, 2015
- Genre: Country
- Length: 3:22
- Label: Open Road
- Songwriter(s): Jared Crump; Brad Rempel; Fred Wilhelm
- Producer(s): Seth Mosley

High Valley singles chronology
"She's with Me" (2015)	"Come on Down" (2015)	"Make You Mine" (2016)

Music video
- "Come on Down" on YouTube

"Come on Down" is a song recorded by Canadian country music duo High Valley for their fourth studio album, County Line (2014). It was released September 29, 2015 as the record's fifth single. The song was written by Jared Crump, Brad Rempel, and Fred Wilhelm. "Come on Down" peaked at number 3 on the Canada Country chart, becoming the group's highest-charting radio hit.

== Content ==
"Come on Down" is a midtempo country song with bluegrass style lyrics and pop-influenced production. The lyrics were inspired by the brothers' hometown of La Crete, Alberta and reinforce the group's tenets of "faith, family and farming."

== Commercial performance ==
"Come on Down" debuted at number 83 on the Canadian Hot 100 chart dated January 16, 2016 as the week's highest-ranking debut. It reached a peak position of 77 on the chart dated February 6, 2016. "Come on Down" entered the Canada Country airplay chart in October 2015 and reached a peak position of 3 on the chart dated January 23, 2016. With this peak, the song surpassed "Make You Mine" (which reached number 5 in 2015) as the group's highest charting single to date.

The song reached number one on the CMT Canada Countdown Chart, earning a No. 1 Song Award from SOCAN.

== Music video ==
The music video for "Come on Down" was filmed in La Crete and premiered October 23, 2015.

== Charts ==
=== Weekly charts ===
Chart (2015–16)	Peak position
Canada (Canadian Hot 100)	77
Canada Country (Billboard)	3

=== Year end charts ===
Chart (2016)	Position
Canada Country (Billboard)	50
