= SaskMusic =

- Type: Trade association
- Region served: Saskatchewan, Canada
- Parent organization: Creative Saskatchewan
- Website: www.saskmusic.org

SaskMusic is a trade association for the music industry for the Canadian province of Saskatchewan, and serves as the province's Canadian Academy of Recording Arts and Sciences representative.

SaskMusic organizes the Saskatchewan Music Awards, an annual awards program first held in 2018.

During the COVID-19 pandemic, SaskMusic established a relief fund for artists and music industry workers and organized an online concert in celebration of National Indigenous Peoples Day.
