= Beloit International Film Festival =

Film festival held in Beloit, Wisconsin

Coordinates: 43°38′48″N 79°23′25″W

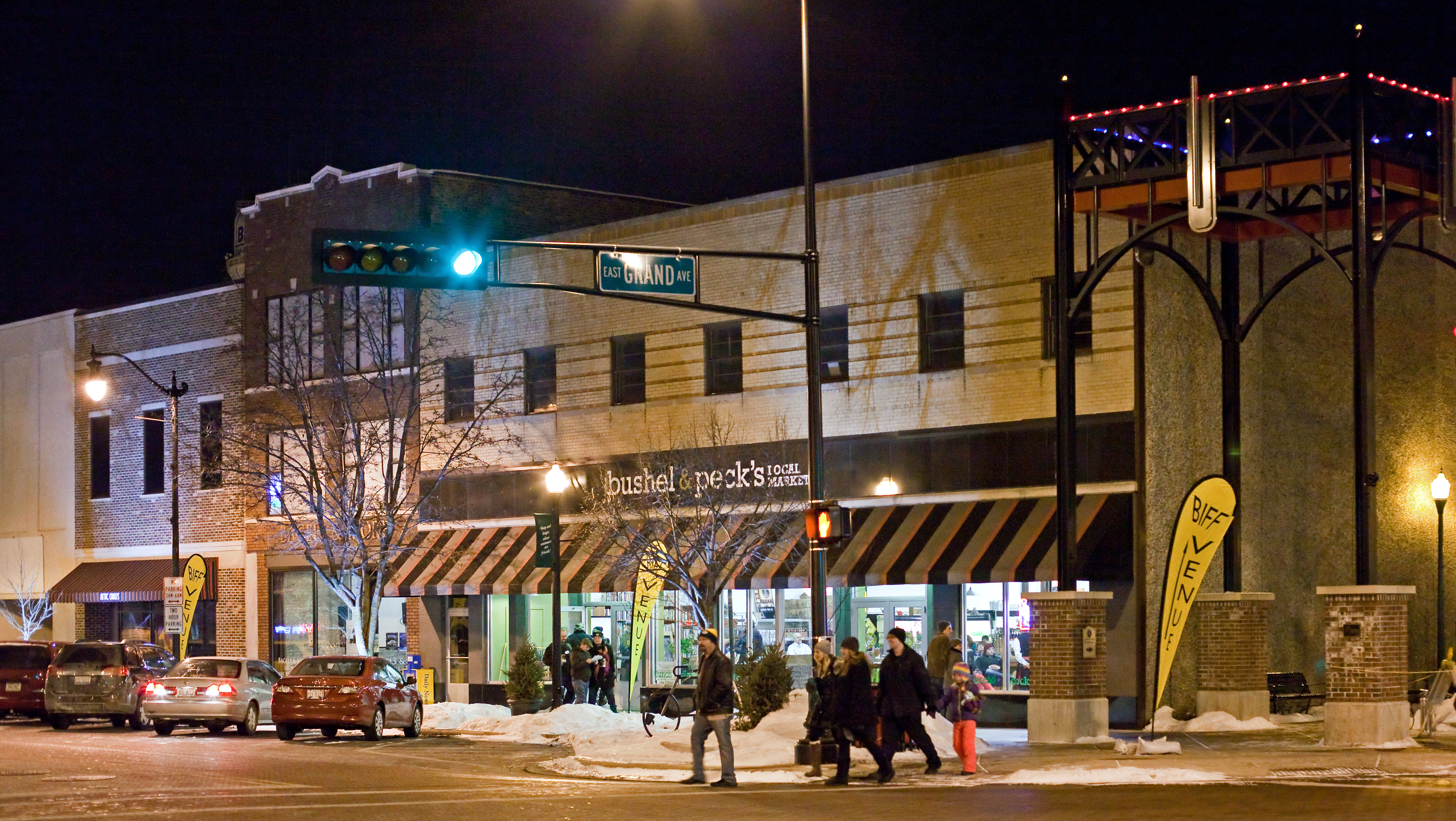
- BIFF is held across multiple screening locations in walkable downtown Beloit Wisconsin
- Location: Beloit, Wisconsin, United States
- Founded: 2005
- Language: International
- Website: beloitfilmfest.org

The Beloit International Film Festival (BIFF) is an annual film festival in Beloit, Wisconsin, usually held in mid-February (as of 2023 the festival moved to end of March/early April). The first edition of the festival took place in 2006. BIFF has evolved from a single weekend to now span 10 days and seven venues. Most venues are in downtown Beloit and within easy walking distance between each. With more than 300 volunteers, it is a community-wide effort, welcoming filmmakers from across the nation and around the world.

== History ==
The first Beloit International Film Festival was presented at a half-dozen venues throughout Beloit's downtown area. It started as a long weekend, with social events going into the night. One of the earliest events was the Silent Film Showcase, presenting films from the silent era accompanied by music performed by the local symphony orchestra. Another early project that continues today is the "Kids at BIFF" program, where fifth graders watch and discuss films.

In 2012, BIFF expanded to 10 days and added films by local filmmakers from Wisconsin and Illinois. The Wisconsin-Illinois Showdown takes place the first weekend of BIFF. In 2014, BIFF became a year-round festival with films shown weekly. In summer, BIFF shows family films at parks in the area.

Selected films are shown in small venues, seating 30–100, most within walking distance of one another. Other events include the annual BIFF Sing Along musical, the final Classic Film Showcase, the Silent Film Showcase, and BIFF CARES, which groups films with a social theme.

== Events ==
- BIFF Year 'Round — weekly screening of films under consideration for the next festival, allowing attendees to vote on inclusion
- BIFF Outdoors — large, outdoor inflatable BIFF screen features films in Beloit and surrounding communities during warm weather
- The Silent Film Showcase — classic silent film accompanied by live orchestra
- BIFF Cares — pairing of films of special social significance with panel discussion
- Kids@BIFF — introducing school-age children to film criticism and filmmaking
- BIFF Sing-a-long — classic film paired with on-screen lyrics
- The Wisconsin/Illinois Showdown — filmmakers from both states pitted against one another in friendly competition
- Filmmaker Workshop — guest filmmaker provides professional insight and guidance into the art and craft of independent filmmaking
- BIFF Classic Film — film festival closing event re-introducing audiences to seminal classic film

== Awards ==
- Power of Film Award
- People's Choice Award
- President’s Award
- Josh Burton Award for Artistry
- Executive Director Award
- Golden Laurel Award
- Best Music Video
- BIFF Documentary Short
- Best Narrative Short
- Best Documentary Feature
- Best Narrative Feature

== See also ==
- Film industry in Wisconsin
- Wisconsin Film Festival
