= High Valley =

Canadian country band

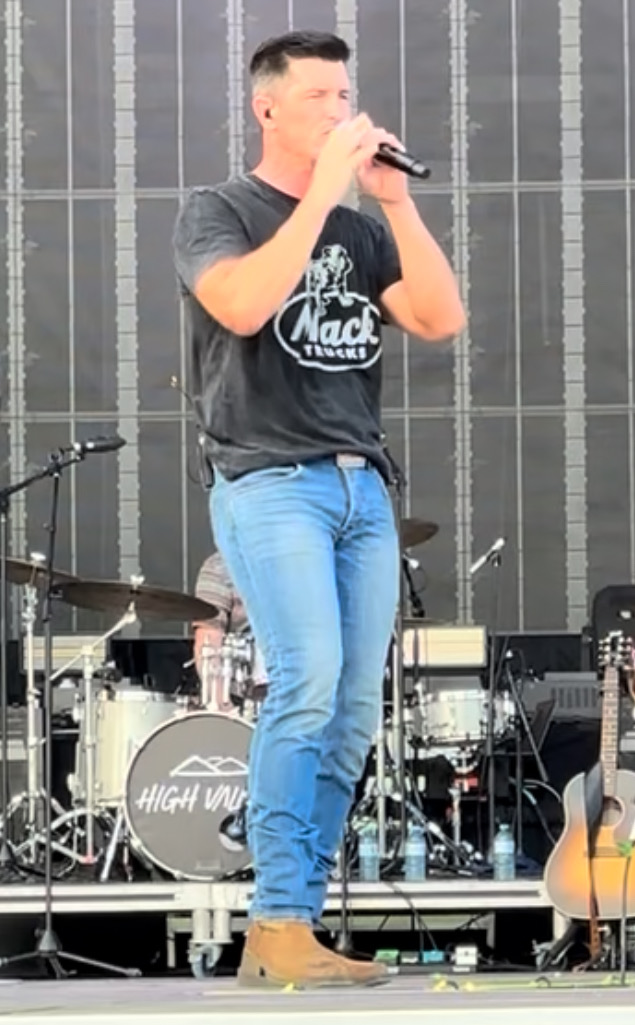
- High Valley's Brad Rempel performing at Boots and Hearts in 2025

Background information
- Origin: La Crete, Alberta, Canada
- Genres: Country; bluegrass
- Years active: 1997–present
- Labels: Open Road; Centricity (US); Atlantic; Warner Nashville; Blue Chair; Cage Free
- Members: Brad Rempel; Dave Myers; Raymond Klassen; Clint Milburn; Andrew Hemmerling
- Past members: Bryan Rempel; Curtis Rempel
- Website: Official website

High Valley is a Canadian country and bluegrass band originally from Blumenort, Alberta, a small community near the hamlet of La Crete. The group is composed of Brad Rempel (lead vocals) and his supporting band, Holt Stuart-Hitchcox (bass guitar), Raymond Klassen (Dobro), Jardeth Hemmerling (mandolin, guitar and vocals), and Andrew Hemmerling (drums). Brad Rempel's brother Bryan Rempel was a member until March 2014, while younger brother Curtis Rempel was a member until June 2021. All three brothers grew up in a Mennonite community and graduated from La Crete Public School.

After a number of chart successes in Canada between 2010 and 2015, High Valley were signed to Atlantic Records Nashville in October 2015. They achieved some success with the singles "Make You Mine" and "She's with Me" at United States country radio. They have three No. 1 hits on the Billboard Canada Country chart with "I Be U Be", "Grew Up On That", and "River's Still Running".

== Discography ==
=== Albums ===
Title	Album details	Peak chart positions			Certifications	Sales
Title	Album details	CAN	US Country	US Heat	Certifications	Sales
Broken Borders	Release date: January 1, 2007; Label: Self-released	—	—	—		
High Valley	Release date: September 14, 2010; Label: Open Road, Centricity	—	—	—		
Love Is a Long Road	Release date: June 12, 2012; Label: Open Road, Centricity	—	—	—		
County Line	Release date: October 14, 2014; Label: Open Road	—	—	—	MC: Gold	
Dear Life	Release date: November 18, 2016; Label: Atlantic / Warner Nashville	36	37	3	MC: Gold	US: 12,000
Way Back	Release date: May 20, 2022; Label: Cage Free	—	—	—		
"—" denotes a recording that failed to chart or was not released to that territory.

=== Extended plays ===
Title	EP details
Hands in the Dirt	Release date: April 1, 2008; Label: Centricity
Farmhouse Sessions	Release date: March 23, 2018; Label: Atlantic / Warner Nashville
Grew Up On That	Release date: May 8, 2020; Label: Atlantic / Warner Nashville
Small Town Somethin'	Release date: February 2, 2024; Label: Cage Free Music Inc.
Paradise & Hurricanes	Release date: March 6, 2026; Label: Cage Free Music Inc.

=== Singles ===
Year	Title	Peak chart positions					Certifications (sales threshold)	Sales	Album
Year	Title	CAN	CAN Country	US	US Country Songs	US Country Airplay	Certifications (sales threshold)	Sales	Album
2007	"Back to You"	—	—	—	—	—			Broken Borders
2010	"I Will Stand by You"	—	16	—	—	—			High Valley
2010	"On the Combine"	—	26	—	—	—			High Valley
2011	"A Father's Love (The Only Way He Knew How)"	98	12	—	—	—			High Valley
2011	"Call Me Old Fashioned"	—	17	—	—	—			High Valley
2012	"Have I Told You I Love You Lately"	91	12	—	—	—			Love Is a Long Road
2012	"Let It Be Me"	89	5	—	—	—			Love Is a Long Road
2012	"Love You for a Long Time"	91	13	—	—	56			Love Is a Long Road
2013	"Trying to Believe"	—	21	—	—	—			Love Is a Long Road
2013	"Rescue You"	80	10	—	—	—			County Line
2014	"County Line"	70	8	—	—	—	MC: Gold		County Line
2014	"Make You Mine" (featuring Ricky Skaggs)	58	5	—	—	—	MC: Platinum		County Line
2015	"She's with Me"	70	6	—	—	—	MC: Platinum		County Line
2015	"Come on Down"	77	3	—	—	—	MC: Gold		County Line
2016	"Make You Mine" (US release)	—	—	— (Note: "Make You Mine" did not enter the Hot 100, but peaked at number eight on the Bubbling Under Hot 100 Singles extension chart.)	21	17	RIAA: Gold	US: 237,000	Dear Life
2016	"Be You"	—	10	—	—	—			County Line
2016	"Every Week's Got a Friday"	—	8	—	—	—			Dear Life
2017	"I Be U Be"	92	1	—	—	—	MC: Platinum		Dear Life
2017	"She's with Me" (US release)	—	—	79	11	7	RIAA: Gold	US: 109,000	Dear Life
2017	"Dear Life"	—	5	—	—	—	MC: Platinum		Dear Life
2018	"Young Forever"	—	10	—	—	—			Dear Life
2019	"Single Man"	81	2	—	—	—	MC: Platinum		Non-album single
2020	"Grew Up On That"	65	1	—	—	— (Note: "Grew Up On That" did not enter Country Airplay, but peaked at No. 44 on Billboard Country Indicator.)	MC: Platinum		Grew Up On That
2020	"River's Still Running"	64	1	—	—	—	MC: Gold		Grew Up On That
2021	"Whatever It Takes"	65	2	—	—	— (Note: "Whatever It Takes" did not enter Country Airplay, but peaked at No. 43 on Billboard Country Indicator.)	MC: Gold		Way Back
2022	"Country Music, Girls and Trucks" (with Granger Smith)	87	6	—	—	—			Way Back
2023	"Do This Life" (with Alison Krauss)	—	4	—	—	—			Way Back
2023	"Small Town Somethin'"	—	6	—	—	—			Small Town Somethin'
2024	"Not Yet"	—	7	—	—	—			Small Town Somethin'
2024	"Buy a Boy a Baseball"	—	21	—	—	—			Small Town Somethin'
2025	"I'm Leavin' You"	—	7	—	—	—			Paradise & Hurricanes
2026	"Fools"	—	13	—	—	—			Paradise & Hurricanes
"—" denotes releases that did not chart or were not released to that territory

==== Christmas singles ====
Year	Title	Peak positions	Album
Year	Title	CAN Country	Album
2022	"Back Home Christmas"	38	Non-album singles
2023	"Run Outta Mistletoe"	41	Non-album singles
2024	"Santa Had a Rough Year"	—	Non-album singles
2025	"Call It Christmas"	—	Non-album singles

==== As featured artist ====
Year	Title	Artist	Peak positions	Album
Year	Title	Artist	CAN Country	Album
2023	"Take Me Backroad"	Tim and the Glory Boys	5	Tim and the Glory Boys

=== Promotional singles ===
Year	Single	Album
2013	"Away in a Manger"	Non-album single
2016	"Young Forever"	Dear Life
2016	"Long Way Home"	Dear Life
2016	"Dear Life"	Dear Life
2016	"Memory Makin'"	Dear Life
2019	"Your Mama"	Grew Up On That
2021	"Never Not"	Way Back
2022	"Run Outta Somedays"	Way Back
2022	"Somebody Tell That Girl" (featuring Anne Wilson)	Way Back

=== Music videos ===
Year	Video	Director
2010	"I Will Stand by You"	Colin Minihan
2010	"On the Combine"	Bill Baumgart
2011	"A Father's Love (The Only Way He Knew How)"	Warren P. Sonoda
2012	"Have I Told You I Love You Lately"	Warren P. Sonoda
2012	"Let It Be Me"	Mark Maryanovich, Carolyne Stossel
2012	"Love You for a Long Time"	Mark Maryanovich, Carolyne Stossel
2013	"Trying to Believe"	
2013	"Rescue You"	Kristin Barlowe
2014	"County Line"	Kristin Barlowe
2015	"Make You Mine"	Kristin Barlowe
2015	"She's with Me"	Roger Pistole
2015	"Come on Down"	
2016	"Every Week's Got a Friday"	
2017	"I Be U Be"	
2019	"Single Man"	
2019	"Single Man" (Bluegrass Version)	
2019	"Your Mama"	
2020	"Grew Up On That"	Benno Nelson / Sam Siske
2021	"River's Still Running"	
2022	"Country Music, Girls and Trucks" (with Granger Smith)	
2023	"Take Me Backroad" (with Tim and the Glory Boys)	

== Tours ==
Headlining

- County Line Tour – 2014
- Make You Mine Tour (Europe) – 2017
- The Highway Finds Tour – 2017
- Small Town Somethin' Tour - 2024
- Paradise & Hurricanes Tour - 2026

Supporting

- Love Unleashed Tour – Martina McBride (2016)
- Soul2Soul: The World Tour – Tim McGraw and Faith Hill (2017)
- Happy Endings Tour – Old Dominion (2018)
- The Journey Tour – Paul Brandt (2019)

== Awards ==
=== Academy of Country Music Awards ===
Year	Category	Result
2018	ACM – New Vocal Duo or Group of the Year	Nominated
2019	ACM – New Vocal Duo or Group of the Year	Nominated

=== GMA Canada Covenant Awards ===
- 2007 two awards: Country/Bluegrass Album of the Year: Broken Borders, and Country/Bluegrass Song of the Year: "Back to You"
- 2011 five awards: Artist of the Year, Group of the Year, Country/Bluegrass Album of the Year: High Valley, Country/Bluegrass Song of the Year: "A Father's Love (The Only Way He Knew How)", and Video of the Year: "A Father's Love (The Only Way He Knew How)"
- 2012 three awards: Artist of the Year, Country/Bluegrass Album of the Year: "Love Is a Long Road" and Country/Bluegrass Song of the Year "Have I Told You I Love You Lately"

=== Canadian Country Music Association Awards ===
Year	Category	Result
2010	Rising Star	Nominated
2011	Group or Duo of the Year	Nominated
2011	Rising Star	Nominated
2012	Group or Duo of the Year	Nominated
2013	Group or Duo of the Year	Nominated
2013	Interactive Artist of the Year	Won
2015	Group or Duo of the Year	Won
2015	Album of the Year – County Line	Nominated
2015	Interactive Artist of the Year	Nominated
2016	Group or Duo of the Year	Won
2017	Fans' Choice Award	Nominated
2017	Group or Duo of the Year	Nominated
2017	Album of the Year – Dear Life	Nominated
2018	Fans' Choice Award	Nominated
2018	Group or Duo of the Year	Nominated
2019	Group or Duo of the Year	Nominated
2020	Group or Duo of the Year	Nominated
2020	Single of the Year – "Single Man"	Nominated
2020	Fans' Choice	Nominated
2020	Group or Duo of the Year	Won
2020	Single of the Year – "Grew Up on That"	Nominated
2022	Fans' Choice	Nominated
2022	Group or Duo of the Year	Nominated
2023	Fans' Choice	Nominated
2023	Group or Duo of the Year	Nominated
2023	Musical Collaboration of the Year - "Do This Life"	Won
2024	Fans' Choice	Nominated
2024	Group or Duo of the Year	Nominated
2024	Musical Collaboration of the Year - "Take Me Backroad"	Nominated
2024	Video of the Year - "Take Me Backroad"	Nominated
2025	Fans' Choice	Nominated
2025	Group or Duo of the Year	Nominated

=== Juno Awards ===
Year	Category	Result
2012	Country Album of the Year – High Valley	Nominated
2016	Country Album of the Year – County Line	Nominated
2023	Country Album of the Year – Way Back	Nominated
