= Open Road Recordings =

Canadian country music record label

- Parent company: RGK Entertainment Group Inc
- Founded: 2003
- Founder: Ron Kitchener
- Distributor: Universal Music Canada
- Genre: Country
- Country of origin: Canada
- Location: Toronto, Ontario
- Official website: openroadrecordings.com

Open Road Recordings, a division of RGK Entertainment Group Ltd., is a Canadian record label specializing in country music. it was established by Ron Kitchener in 2003 and distributed through Universal Music Canada. The label also owns an American division in Nashville, Tennessee.

== Open Road artists ==
- Blackjack Billy
- Dustin Bird
- Tim Hicks
- Hunter Brothers
- Dayna Reid

== Former artists ==
- Dean Brody
- Ridley Bent
- Emerson Drive
- The Ennis Sisters
- Adam Gregory
- Adam Harvey
- The Higgins
- High Valley
- Willie Mack
- Jake Mathews
- Jason McCoy
- Madeline Merlo
- One More Girl
- Amy Nelson
- Tara Oram
- Prairie Oyster
- Johnny Reid
- The Road Hammers
- River Town Saints
- Sons of Daughters
- Doc Walker
- The Wilkinsons
- The Wilsons

== See also ==
- List of record labels
