= Love and Theft =

Love and Theft may refer to:

- Love and Theft (Bob Dylan album), 31st album of Bob Dylan
- Love and Theft (duo), an American country music band
  - Love and Theft (Love and Theft album), the band's self-titled album
