= Stamping Ground =

Stamping Ground may refer to:

- Stamping Ground (album), a 1994 album by Bill Bruford's Earthworks
- Stamping Ground, a Pink Floyd bootleg release
- The Stamping Ground, a 2001 album by Runrig
- "Stamping Ground", a composition by Moondog
- Stampin' Ground, a British heavy metal band
- Stamping Ground (music festival)
- Stamping Ground (dance festival), New South Wales, Australia
- Stamping Ground (ballet), a 1983 contemporary dance
- Stamping Ground, Kentucky, a town in the United States

== See also ==
- Stomping Ground, a 2000 album by Goldfinger
- Stompin' Grounds, an album by The Kentucky Headhunters
- Stompin' Ground
- StompinGrounds
- Stompen Ground
