= 5:01 =

Studio album by Tim Hicks
- Released: August 5, 2014
- Genre: Country
- Length: 40:18
- Label: RGK/Open Road
- Producer: Jeff Coplan

Tim Hicks chronology
Throw Down (2013)	5:01 (2014)	Shake These Walls (2016)

Singles from 5:01
- 1. "Here Comes the Thunder" Released: May 13, 2014; 2. "She Don't Drink Whiskey Anymore" Released: September 2014; 3. "So Do I" Released: February 17, 2015; 4. "Young, Alive and In Love" Released: July 10, 2015

5:01+

5:01 is the second studio album by Canadian country music artist Tim Hicks. It was released on August 5, 2014, via RGK Entertainment Group/Open Road Recordings. The album features appearances by Blackjack Billy, Clayton Bellamy and Madeline Merlo.

A special edition of the album, 5:01+, was released on September 4, 2015, including the single "Young, Alive and In Love".

== Track listing ==
No.	Title	Writer(s)	Length
1.	"Here Comes the Thunder"	Todd Clark, Tim Hicks, Gavin Slate	3:07
2.	"Dust and Bone"	Anthony Krizan, Steve Pasch, Bruce Wallace	3:10
3.	"Just Like You"	Jaron Boyer, Hicks, Ben Stennis	3:19
4.	"She Don't Drink Whiskey Anymore"	Dylan Altman, Tommy Lee James, Jon Randall	3:03
5.	"You Know You're Home"	Hicks, Steven MacDougall, Gordie Sampson	3:14
6.	"Hands Up"	Phil Barton, Boyer, Hicks	3:07
7.	"So Do I"	Barton, Preston Brust, Jason Matthews	3:06
8.	"A Little Drinkalong" (featuring Blackjack Billy and Clayton Bellamy)	Noel Billings, Rob Blackledge, Jeff Coplan, Hicks	3:41
9.	"Calling All Trucks"	Billings, Coplan, Hicks	3:16
10.	"Ready to Say Goodnight" (featuring Madeline Merlo)	Clark, Hicks, Jessica Mitchell	3:56
11.	"My Baby"	Wallace, Brian White	3:30
12.	"Too Young to Care"	Hicks, Dan Swinimer	3:49
Total length:			40:18

5:01+ Special Edition tracks
No.	Title	Writer(s)	Length
13.	"Underdog"	Clark, Hicks, Slate	3:33
14.	"Young, Alive and In Love"	Cary Barlowe, Nathan Chapman, Derrick Southerland	3:16
15.	"Don't Wanna Go"	Coplan, Hicks	3:09
16.	"Friends Around Here"	Coplan, Hicks	3:23
Total length:			53:41

== Chart performance ==
=== Album ===
Chart (2014)	Peak position
Canadian Albums (Billboard)	7

=== Singles ===
Year	Single	Peak chart positions	
Year	Single	CAN Country	CAN
2014	"Here Comes the Thunder"	10	69
2014	"She Don't Drink Whiskey Anymore"	10	91
2015	"So Do I"	8	87
2015	"Young, Alive and In Love"	11	—
"—" denotes releases that did not chart
