= Throw Down (album) =

Studio album by Tim Hicks
- Released: August 27, 2013
- Genre: Country
- Length: 38:36
- Label: RGK/Open Road
- Producer: Jeff Coplan

Tim Hicks chronology
| Throw Down (2013) | 5:01 (2014) |

Singles from Throw Down
- 1. "Get By" Released: December 2012; 2. "Hell Raisin' Good Time" Released: May 2013; 3. "Buzz, Buzz, Buzzing" Released: September 2013; 4. "Got a Feeling" Released: January 2014

Professional ratings
Review scores
| Source | Rating |
|---|---|
| Top Country | 4/5 stars |

Throw Down is the debut studio album by Canadian country music artist Tim Hicks. It was released on August 27, 2013 via RGK Entertainment Group/Open Road Recordings. It debuted at number 16 on the Billboard Canadian Albums Chart for the week of September 14, 2013.

Throw Down was nominated for Country Album of the Year at the 2014 Juno Awards.

== Critical reception ==
Kayla Tinson of Top Country gave the album four stars out of five, writing that it is "aptly named, packed full of fun-inducing party songs you’ll want to listen to again and again."

== Track listing ==
| No. | Title | Writer(s) | Length |
|---|---|---|---|
| 1. | "Hell Raisin' Good Time" | Jeff Coplan, Tim Hicks, Casey Marshall, Neil Sanderson | 3:04 |
| 2. | "Get By" | Shawn Hamm, Hicks, Tyler Hubbard, Brian Kelley, Marshall, Sanderson | 3:12 |
| 3. | "Just Add Water" | Coplan, Hicks | 3:12 |
| 4. | "Buzz, Buzz, Buzzing" | Jaron Boyer, Ben Stennis | 3:17 |
| 5. | "Got a Feeling" (featuring Blackjack Billy) | Noll Billings, Coplan, Hicks | 3:16 |
| 6. | "Long Way Jose" | Larry Haack, Hicks | 3:16 |
| 7. | "Stronger Beer" | Coplan, Hicks | 3:03 |
| 8. | "Sure Ain't Tough Tonight" | Coplan, Hicks | 3:22 |
| 9. | "Nothing On You and Me" | Coplan, Hicks, Marshall, Sanderson | 3:10 |
| 10. | "Greasy John Deere Cap" | Rob Harris, Greg Johnson | 2:45 |
| 11. | "Can't Get Enough" | Hicks, Jason Matthews, Steve Pasch | 3:18 |
| 12. | "Cheers to You" | Jason Blaine, Coplan, Hicks | 3:41 |
| Total length: | | | 38:36 |

== Chart performance ==
=== Album ===
| Chart (2013) | Peak position |
|---|---|
| Canadian Albums (Billboard) | 16 |

=== Singles ===
| Year | Single | Peak chart positions | |
| Year | Single | CAN Country | CAN |
|---|---|---|---|
| 2012 | "Get By" | 9 | 57 |
| 2013 | "Hell Raisin' Good Time" | 9 | 59 |
| 2013 | "Buzz, Buzz, Buzzing" | 8 | 94 |
| 2014 | "Got a Feeling" | 14 | 62 |
