= The Good, the Bad and the Pretty =

2021 song by Tim Hicks

Single by Tim Hicks

from the album Talk to Time
- Released: February 19, 2021
- Genre: Country rock
- Length: 2:58
- Label: Open Road; UMA
- Songwriter(s): Tim Hicks; Derek Hoffman; Deric Ruttan

Tim Hicks singles chronology
"Wreck This Town" (2020)	"The Good, the Bad and the Pretty" (2021)	"Whiskey Does" (2022)

Lyric Video
- "The Good, the Bad and the Pretty" on YouTube

"The Good, the Bad and the Pretty" is a song co-written and recorded by Canadian country artist Tim Hicks. The track was co-written with Derek Hoffman and Deric Ruttan. It was the lead single off Hicks' 2021 extended play Campfire Troubador and his 2022 album Talk to Time.

== Background ==
"The Good, the Bad and the Pretty" was the first song Hicks had released in eight months. He remarked that the song is "about that one bar in every town, that welcomes all sorts of characters on any given night", adding "it represents a lot of the bars I played on a nightly basis for years". Hicks said he made many friends in those bars, calling them "the best people" and wanted to "pay tribute to them" with this song.

== Critical reception ==
Matthew Weaver of Country104 said the song was released "just in time for spring, sunshine and the outdoors".

== Charts ==
Chart (2021)	Peak position
Canada Country (Billboard)	26
