= Loud (Tim Hicks song) =

2018 single by Tim Hicks

Single by Tim Hicks

from the album New Tattoo
- Released: April 23, 2018
- Genre: Country rock
- Length: 2:56
- Label: Open Road; ABC
- Songwriter(s): Tim Hicks; Todd Clark; Gavin Slate; Travis Wood
- Producer(s): Todd Clark

Tim Hicks singles chronology
"Forever Rebels" (2017)	"Loud" (2018)	"The Worst Kind" (2018)

Music video
- "Loud" on YouTube

"Loud" is a song co-written and recorded by Canadian country artist Tim Hicks. The track was produced by Todd Clark, who co-wrote the track with Hicks, Gavin Slate, and Travis Wood. The track was the lead single off Hicks' fourth studio album New Tattoo.

== Background ==
Hicks told Top Country: "We had a riot writing and recording 'LOUD', and I think it shows on the track, it's high energy, guitar driven, and begs to be played live, so I can't wait to get out and perform it!"

== Commercial performance ==
"Loud" was certified Gold by Music Canada on October 7, 2020, with over 40,000 sales. It reached a peak of #4 on the Billboard Canada Country chart dated July 28, 2018, marking Hicks' eleventh Top 10 hit.

== In popular culture ==
"Loud" was licensed for use during the 2018 Stanley Cup playoffs on Sportsnet in Canada and NBC Sports in the United States. Team Canada chose "Loud" as their official goal song for the 2021 World Junior Ice Hockey Championships in Edmonton. The song was heard 41 times across Team Canada's 41 goals.

== Music video ==
The official music video for "Loud" premiered on May 31, 2018 and was directed by Peter Zavadil.

== Charts ==
Chart (2018)	Peak position
Australia Country (TMN)	22
Canada Country (Billboard)	4

== Certifications ==
Region	Certification	Certified units/sales
Canada (Music Canada)	Gold	40,000^{‡}
^{‡} Sales+streaming figures based on certification alone.
