= Whiskey Does =

2022 song by Tim Hicks

Single by Tim Hicks

from the album Talk to Time
- Released: February 25, 2022
- Genre: Country rock
- Length: 3:36
- Label: Open Road
- Songwriter(s): Deric Ruttan; Monty Criswell; Tim Hicks
- Producer(s): Deric Ruttan

Tim Hicks singles chronology
"The Good, the Bad and the Pretty" (2021)	"Whiskey Does" (2022)	"Dodge Out of Hell" (2022)

Music video
- "Whiskey Does" on YouTube

"Whiskey Does" is a song co-written and recorded by Canadian country rock artist Tim Hicks. He wrote the song with Deric Ruttan and Monty Criswell, while Ruttan produced it. It was the second single off Hicks' fifth studio album Talk to Time.

== Background ==
Hicks and his co-writers wrote "Whiskey Does" in 2021, and he stated it was based on the idea that "everyone's been in a relationship at some point in their life that's maybe not the best relationship for you, but there's something there that keeps you going back to the well to 'try again,'" with the singer in the song deciding to "choose the whiskey over the toxic relationship".

== Critical reception ==
Nanci Dagg of Canadian Beats Media stated that the track "showcases Hicks’s versatility," calling it a "a heartbreaking story with an inebriating effect" that is "grounded by his unmistakable voice". Top Country named the song their "Pick of the Week" for March 4, 2022, describing it as "an amazing radio-friendly song," noting Hicks' "crisp vocals".

== Accolades ==
Year	Association	Category	Result	Ref
2022	Canadian Country Music Awards	Songwriter(s) of the Year	Nominated	
2022	Canadian Country Music Awards	Record Producer of the Year - Deric Ruttan	Nominated	
2022	Canadian Country Music Awards	Video of the Year	Nominated	
2023	Country Music Association of Ontario	Songwriter(s) of the Year	Nominated	

== Music video ==
The official music video for "Whiskey Does" was directed by Adam Rothlein and premiered on YouTube on April 6, 2022.

== Track listings ==
Digital download - single

1. "Whiskey Does" – 3:36

Digital download - single

1. "Whiskey Does" – 3:44
  (Reimagined) (featuring Roz)

== Charts ==
Chart performance for "Whiskey Does"
Chart (2022)	Peak position
Canada Country (Billboard)	10
