= Dancing in Circles =

"Dancin' in Circles"

Single by Love and Theft

from the album World Wide Open
- Released: November 30, 2009
- Genre: Country pop
- Length: 3:07
- Label: Lyric Street
- Songwriters: Stephen Barker Liles; Robert Ellis Orrall; Roger Springer
- Producers: Jeff Coplan; Robert Ellis Orrall

Love and Theft singles chronology
"Runaway" (2009)	"Dancin' in Circles" (2009)	"Angel Eyes" (2011)

"Dancing in Circles" is a song recorded by American country music group Love and Theft. Co-written by band member Stephen Barker Liles with Robert Ellis Orrall and Roger Springer, it was released in November 2009 as the second single from the band's debut album World Wide Open. The song is the final single to include founding member Brian Bandas, who left the band in January 2011.

== Content ==
"Dancing in Circles" is a mid-tempo song mostly accompanied by mandolin, with fiddle fills. It is written in the Key of E Major. Featuring Stephen Barker Liles on lead vocals, the song's narrator wants people to get along, and "share this world together" as sisters and brothers, instead of "dancing in circles" (i.e. fighting and war).

== Critical reception ==
Dan Milliken of Country Universe gave the song a B− rating. He called the song "a Contemporary Christian-styled waltz with a few nice thoughts for humankind." "Dancing in Circles" was also described favorably by Roughstock critic Matt Bjorke, who said that "the song fits in well for both the softer fall/winter vibe at country radio while also featuring a message that is universal and questions why humanity does the things that we do to each other."

== Chart performance ==
"Dancing in Circles" debuted at number 59 on the U.S. Billboard Hot Country Songs chart dated December 12, 2009, and reached a peak of number 25 in March 2010.

Chart (2009–2010)	Peak position
US Hot Country Songs (Billboard)	25
