= Hell Raisin' Good Time =

Single by Tim Hicks

from the album Throw Down
- Released: May 21, 2013
- Genre: Country
- Length: 3:04
- Label: RGK/Open Road
- Songwriter(s): Jeff Coplan; Tim Hicks; Casey Marshall; Neil Sanderson
- Producer(s): Jeff Coplan

Tim Hicks singles chronology
"Get By" (2012)	"Hell Raisin' Good Time" (2013)	"Buzz, Buzz, Buzzing" (2013)

"Hell Raisin' Good Time" is a song recorded by Canadian country music artist Tim Hicks. It was released in May 2013 as the second single from his debut album, Throw Down. It peaked at number 59 on the Canadian Hot 100 in September 2013.

== Critical reception ==
In his review of Hicks' EP, Henry Lees of Top Country wrote that the song "turns things up another few notches with some guitar growl and the best chorus hook of the bunch."

== Music video ==
The music video premiered on May 31, 2013.

== Chart performance ==
"Hell Raisin' Good Time" debuted at number 93 on the Canadian Hot 100 for the week of June 29, 2013.

Chart (2013)	Peak position
Canada (Canadian Hot 100)	59
Canada Country (Billboard)	9

== Certifications ==
Region	Certification
Canada (Music Canada)	Platinum
