= Runaway (Love and Theft song) =

Single by Love and Theft

from the album World Wide Open
- Released: March 16, 2009
- Recorded: January 2009
- Genre: Country pop
- Length: 3:50
- Label: Carolwood
- Songwriters: Robert Blackledge; Stephen Barker Liles; Canaan Smith
- Producers: Jeff Coplan; Robert Ellis Orrall

Love and Theft singles chronology
"Runaway" (2009)	"Dancing in Circles" (2009)

"Runaway" is a debut song written by Stephen Barker Liles, Robert Blackledge and Canaan Smith and recorded by American country music group Love and Theft. It is the lead-off single from the band's debut album World Wide Open. The song debuted on the Hot Country Songs chart in March 2009.

== Content ==
The song's narrator wants to get from with his current life as it is not going well, and he decides to become a "runaway."

== Critical reception ==
Dan Milliken of Country Universe.net gave the song a C rating, and said this in his review of the song that the band "is another three-piece boy band who sound like they paid a lot of attention to 80’s pop-rock and care deeply about the inner yearnings of suburban girls between the ages of 11 and 17." Juli Thanki of Engine 145 gave it a thumbs-down, saying that the band "combine[s] the adult contemporary pop of 'Iris' era Goo Goo Dolls and the treacly sentiment featured in your average Rascal Flatts song with the nonthreatening cuteness of the Jonas Brothers." She also thought that the lead vocals lacked grit in comparison to the song's theme of running away.

== Chart performance ==
"Runaway" debuted at number 60 on the Billboard Hot Country Songs chart for the week of March 14, 2009. It debuted at number 65 on the Hot 100 for the chart dated September 12, 2009.

Chart (2009)	Peak position
US Hot Country Songs (Billboard)	10
US Billboard Hot 100	65

=== Year-end charts ===
Chart (2009)	Position
US Country Songs (Billboard)	36
