= Get By (Tim Hicks song) =

Single by Tim Hicks

from the album Throw Down
- Released: December 18, 2012
- Genre: Country
- Length: 3:12
- Label: RGK/Open Road
- Songwriters: Shawn Hamm; Tim Hicks; Tyler Hubbard; Brian Kelley; Casey Marshall; Neil Sanderson
- Producer: Jeff Coplan

Tim Hicks singles chronology
"Get By" (2012)	"Hell Raisin' Good Time" (2013)

"Get By" is the debut single by Canadian country music artist Tim Hicks, released in December 2012 from his 2013 debut album, Throw Down. Hicks co-wrote the song with Tyler Hubbard and Brian Kelley of Florida Georgia Line, Neil Sanderson of Three Days Grace, Casey Marshall and Shawn Hamm. It peaked at number 57 on the Canadian Hot 100 in March 2013.

"Get By" was the number one selling country song in Canada for seventeen weeks. Sales of the single surpassed 100,000 units in less than eight months. It was certified gold by Music Canada in June 2013.

== Critical reception ==
Henry Lees of Top Country called the song a "singable stomper," writing that "it’s as great an introductory calling card as they come and an ear worm of the most welcome kind."

== Music video ==
The music video premiered in March 2013. It was directed by Jason Lupish and filmed in Thorold, Ontario.

== Chart performance ==
"Get By" debuted at number 90 on the Canadian Hot 100 for the week of February 16, 2013.

Chart (2013)	Peak position
Canada Hot 100 (Billboard)	57
Canada Country (Billboard)	9

== Certifications ==
Region	Certification
Canada (Music Canada)	Gold
