= World Wide Open =

Studio album by Love and Theft
- Released: August 25, 2009
- Genre: Country
- Label: Carolwood
- Producer: Jeff Coplan; Robert Ellis Orrall

Love and Theft chronology
World Wide Open (2009)	Love and Theft (2012)

Singles from World Wide Open
- 1. "Runaway" Released: March 16, 2009; 2. "Dancing in Circles" Released: November 30, 2009

Professional ratings
Review scores
Source	Rating
Allmusic	4/5 stars
Country Weekly	3.5/5 stars
The New York Times	mixed

World Wide Open is the debut studio album by American country music band Love and Theft. It was released on August 25, 2009 (see 2009 in country music) via Carolwood Records, a sister label of Lyric Street Records. The album includes the single "Runaway", which is a Top 10 hit on the Billboard Hot Country Songs charts.

== Content ==
At least one member of the band had a hand in co-writing every track on the album. Co-writers include former RCA Records artist Robert Ellis Orrall, as well as Roger Springer and The Warren Brothers. Lead-off single "Runaway", which Stephen Barker Liles co-wrote, has reached Top 10 on the U.S. Billboard Hot Country Songs charts. Shortly after "Runaway" peaked, Carolwood was consolidated with Lyric Street Records. The second single is "Dancing in Circles."

== Critical reception ==
Todd Sterling gave four stars out of five in his Allmusic review, where he referred to the album as "teeming with tasty pop melodies and delicious hooks" and said that it should allow the band to compete with labelmates Rascal Flatts. Chris Neal of Country Weekly magazine gave the album three-and-a-half stars out of five. His review calls the album "surprisingly subdued" outside the lead-off single and makes note of the shared lead vocals among all three members, but also criticizes the vocals for not showing the members' personalities clearly. The New York Times reviewer Jon Caramanica gave a mixed review, calling it "charmingly uncomplicated, a promising album from a band making the most of limited resources."

== Track listing ==
No.	Title	Writer(s)	Length
1.	"World Wide Open"	Eric Gunderson, Danny Orton	3:27
2.	"Runaway"	Rob Blackledge, Canaan Smith, Stephen Barker Liles	3:50
3.	"Dancing in Circles"	Liles, Robert Ellis Orrall, Roger Springer	3:07
4.	"It's Up to You"	Orrall, Gunderson, Chris Carpenter	3:19
5.	"You to Miss"	Brian Bandas, Jeff Coplan	4:04
6.	"Can't Go Back"	Coplan, Gunderson, Orrall	3:31
7.	"Don't Wake Me"	Coplan, Liles	3:23
8.	"Freedom"	Liles, Jay Joyce, Brad Warren, Brett Warren	3:36
9.	"Slow Down"	Bandas, Gunderson, Orrall	3:37
10.	"Me Without You"	Coplan, Smith, Liles	3:41
11.	"Drowning"	Coplan, Bandas, Gunderson, Liles	4:22

== Personnel ==
Love and Theft

- Brian Bandas – lead vocals, background vocals, piano, acoustic guitar, electric guitar
- Eric Gunderson – lead vocals, background vocals, acoustic guitar, bass guitar
- Stephen Barker Liles – lead vocals, background vocals

Additional musicians

- Mike Brignardello – bass guitar
- Tom Bukovac – electric guitar
- Joe Caverlee – fiddle, mandolin
- Jeff Coplan – acoustic guitar, electric guitar, bass guitar, mandolin, Dobro, percussion, Hammond B-3 organ
- Eric Darken – percussion
- Dan Dugmore – steel guitar
- Connie Ellisor – violin
- Shannon Forrest – drums
- Kevin Haynie – banjo
- Chris McHugh – drums
- Greg Morrow – drums
- Robert Ellis Orrall – percussion, Hammond B-3 organ, keyboards
- Carole Rabinowitz-Neuen – cello
- Darren Theriault – bass guitar

Strings arrangements by David Hoffner.

== Chart performance ==
=== Album ===
Chart (2009)	Peak position
U.S. Billboard Top Country Albums	10
U.S. Billboard 200	36

=== Singles ===
Year	Single	Peak chart positions	
Year	Single	US Country	US
2009	"Runaway"	10	65
2009	"Dancing in Circles"	25	—
"—" denotes releases that did not chart
