= Stronger Beer =

2013 song by Tim Hicks

Song by Tim Hicks

from the album Throw Down
- Released: August 27, 2013
- Genre: Country
- Length: 3:03
- Label: Open Road
- Songwriters: Tim Hicks; Jeff Coplan

Lyric Video
- "Stronger Beer" on YouTube

"Stronger Beer" is a song recorded by Canadian country music artist Tim Hicks. He wrote the song with Jeff Coplan. It was included on Hicks' debut studio album Throw Down.

== Background ==
Hicks and frequent collaborator Jeff Coplan wrote "Stronger Beer", intending for it to be a joke to show Hicks' American manager at the time. Hicks wanted to play "Stronger Beer" for his manager first, then show him a more serious song that he actually intended to record. His manager urged him to release "Stronger Beer". Hicks initially was hesitant to do so, believing lyrics such as "We've got bigger balls and longer fields" (a contrast between Canadian football and American football) would prevent him from being taken seriously as an artist. Nonetheless, Hicks subsequently recorded the song for his debut album.

The song was never released as a single to radio or digital platforms, but a lyric video was released to YouTube. The original demo of the song that Hicks presented to his manager was ultimately released, as Hicks felt that any attempt to re-record it would not match the energy they brought in the demo.

== Lyrical content ==
"Stronger Beer" is a humorous cultural comparison, intended to show the differences between Canada and the United States. The song is sung from the perspective of a Canadian, and highlights direct contrasts between both countries such as popular brands of chocolate ("We eat Smarties, you eat M&M's") to well-known celebrities ("We got Bryan Adams, but hey you got Bruce Springsteen").

Hicks described the song as a representation of if "two drunk guys were sitting in a bar and one was from the states and one was from Canada, what would they be talking about? Maybe about stronger beer.”

== Commercial performance ==
Despite never having been released as a single, "Stronger Beer" has been certified Double Platinum by Music Canada.

== Music video ==
The official lyric video for "Stronger Beer" premiered on YouTube on March 8, 2013. The video was created by graphic designer Mitch Nevins.

== Credits and personnel ==
Credits adapted from Apple Music.

- Rob Blackledge — background vocals
- Nick Buda — drums
- Jeff Coplan — background vocals
- Tim Hicks — lead vocals, guitar

== Certifications ==
Region	Certification	Certified units/sales
Canada (Music Canada)	2× Platinum	160,000^{‡}
^{‡} Sales+streaming figures based on certification alone.
