= Talk to Time =

2023 song by Tim Hicks

Single by Tim Hicks

from the album Talk to Time
- Released: February 21, 2023
- Genre: Country rock
- Length: 3:29
- Label: Open Road
- Songwriters: Josh Osborne; Ross Copperman; Shane McAnally
- Producer: Deric Ruttan

Tim Hicks singles chronology
"Dodge Out of Hell" (2022)	"Talk to Time" (2023)	"Yee to the Haw" (2023)

Music video
- "Talk to Time" on YouTube

"Talk to Time" is a song recorded by Canadian country rock artist Tim Hicks. The song was written by Josh Osborne, Ross Copperman, and Shane McAnally, while the track was produced by Deric Ruttan. It is the fourth single and title track off Hicks' fifth studio album Talk to Time.

== Background ==
Hicks usually writes his own songs, and he was resultingly somewhat hesitant to record "Talk to Time", which was written by Nashville songwriters Josh Osborne, Ross Copperman, and Shane McAnally. He liked the "slowing down time" sentiment of the song, but felt it was too slow for his country rock style. After encouragement from his wife, his kids, his manager, and his producer Deric Ruttan, Hicks decided to record a demo at home and "fell in love" with the song. He subsequently recorded it and later remarked that it is now a song that he "can't imagine not singing" as it "really hits home".

== Critical reception ==
Graham Rockingham of the Hamilton Spectator remarked that "Talk to Time" is a "fitting" song for this stage of Hicks' career, ten years after the release of his debut album, describing it as a "sentimental tune about all those important things in our lives that sometimes we’re just too busy to appreciate as they’re happening".

== Live performance ==
Hicks performed "Talk to Time" live on CityTV's program "Breakfast Television", and the performance was uploaded to their website afterwards.

== Music video ==
The official music video for "Talk to Time" premiered exclusively on iHeartRadio.ca on February 21, 2023. The video was directed by Travis Didluck and was filmed under the Burlington Skyway bridge in southern Ontario. Hicks stated that he was surprised when his team told him where they were filming, as he was unaware that anyone could film under the Burlington Skyway. The day that they filmed the video was "cold and windy", and a make-shift makeup tent on the set was blown away by the wind while Hicks was sitting in it. The music video was later uploaded to YouTube on February 22, 2023.

== Charts ==
Chart performance for "Talk to Time"
Chart (2023)	Peak position
Canada Country (Billboard)	7

== Certifications ==
Certifications for "Talk to Time"
Region	Certification	Certified units/sales
Canada (Music Canada)	Gold	40,000^{‡}
^{‡} Sales+streaming figures based on certification alone.
