= Tim Hicks =

Canadian country singer-songwriter

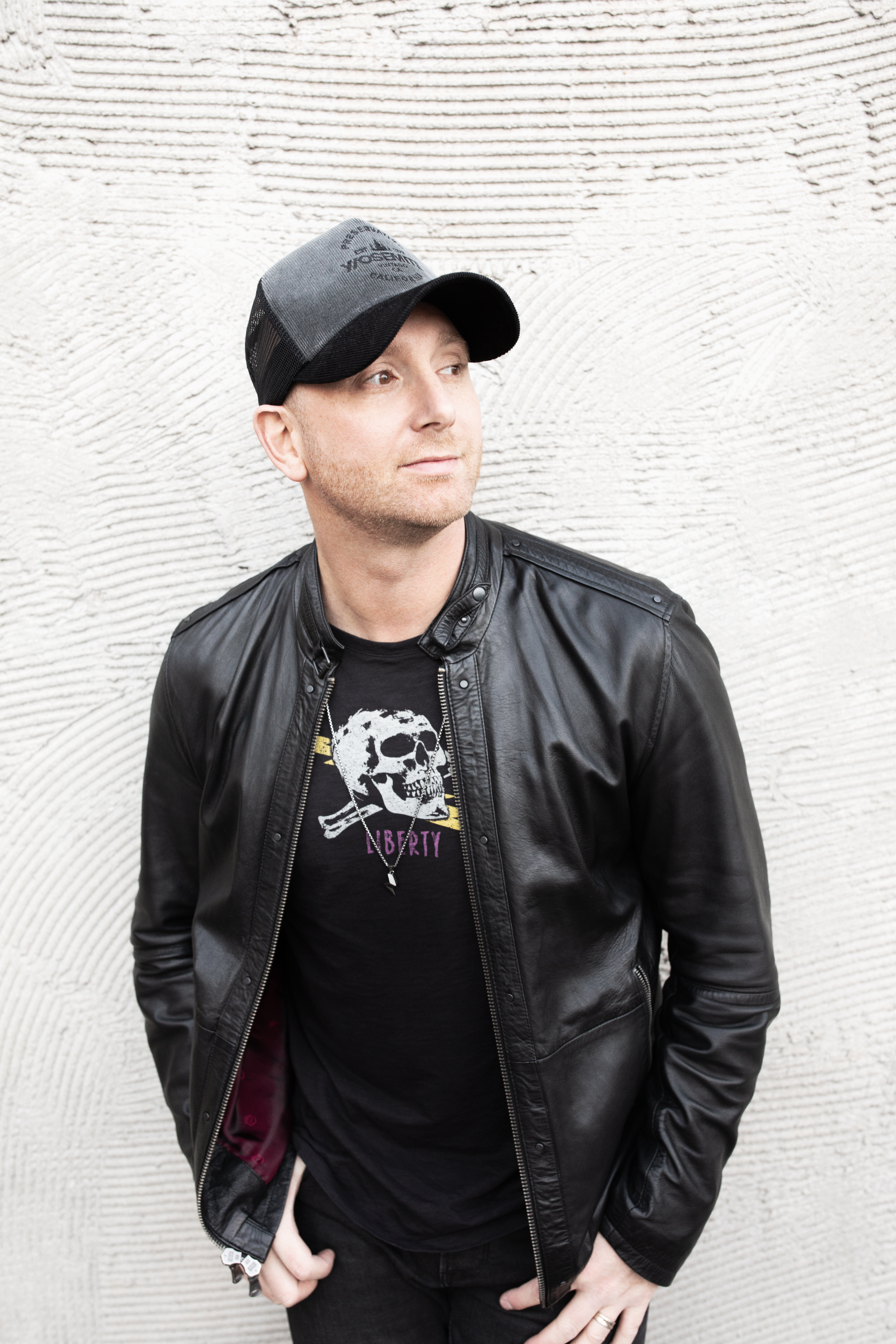

Background information
- Born: August 22, 1979 (age 47); Niagara Falls, Ontario, Canada
- Origin: Niagara Falls, Ontario, Canada
- Genre: Country
- Occupation: Singer-songwriter
- Years active: 2012–present
- Labels: Open Road; ABC Music
- Website: timhicksmusic.com

Tim Hicks (born August 22, 1979) is a Canadian country music singer-songwriter from Niagara Falls, Ontario. Since releasing his debut single "Get By" in 2012, he has had eighteen top ten hits on the Canada Country chart. His albums include: Throw Down, 5:01, Shake These Walls, and New Tattoo.

Hicks has earned four nominations for the JUNO Awards. He has also won a CCMA Award, earned a double platinum certification for "Stronger Beer", four platinum selling singles, seven gold singles ("Loud" is one), one gold album, and two No. 1 chart topping singles: "What a Song Should Do", and "No Truck Song".

== Personal life ==
At the age of six, Hicks started taking music lessons at the Ontario Conservatory of Music in Niagara Falls. Tim is married to Amanda Hicks, and they have 2 children.

In 2002, Hicks graduated from the University of Waterloo with a bachelor's in Psychology. During his time at the University of Waterloo, Hicks spent his spare time playing at open mic nights across the Waterloo Region.

His father is James Hicks.

== Career ==
=== Early career ===
Early in his career, Hicks built a loyal and dedicated fan base in his home town of Niagara Falls by frequently playing at the local pubs and wineries. This is what led to him being discovered by Open Road Recordings.

=== Record deal and Throw Down ===
In 2011, Hicks signed a deal with his record label Open Road Recordings. Hicks then opened for Dallas Smith and Chad Brownlee on the Boys of Fall tour in 2012.

In 2013, Hicks released his debut album Throw Down, which featured his debut single "Get By" that has since been certified Platinum. "Get By" landed in the Top 10 at Country Radio in less than 8 weeks and became his first Gold single.

"Get By" performed well on the digital charts as the number-one selling Canadian Country single for more than 17 weeks.

According to Mediabase, Hicks was the most played debut country artist in 2013 and was also the best selling digital Canadian country artist of the year.

==== “Stronger Beer” ====
One of the tracks "Stronger Beer" from Hicks's Throw Down album is a humorous take on the comparisons of Canadian and American cultures. Although the song was never released as a single, a lyric video was released March 8, 2013, and became a cultural hit. The song has gone on to accumulate over 10 million streams and was certified Platinum in Canada in May 2017.

=== 5:01, 5:01+, and Tim Hicks ===
Hicks' second album 5:01 was released August 5, 2014. This album featured the Top 10 singles "Here Comes the Thunder", "She Don't Drink Whiskey Anymore", and "So Do I".

In 2014, it was announced that Hicks would join Dierks Bentley's Riser tour as an opening act for its Canadian dates.

An extended version of 5:01 called 5:01+ was released on July 10, 2015 with four new songs, including the Top 10 hit "Young, Alive and in Love". "Young, Alive and in Love" also reached Top 10 in Australia on the CMC Top 50 charts.

Later in the Fall of 2015, Hicks headlined his first Canadian national tour called the “Get A Little Crazy Tour”, with openers Cold Creek County and Jason Benoit.

Tim Hicks, a combination of hits from Throw Down and 5:01+, was released in Australia and New Zealand on Jan 28, 2016 through ABC Music. This album reached #4 on the iTunes charts.

=== Shake These Walls and tour ===
Hicks's next album Shake These Walls was released on September 9, 2016. It was produced by CMA and Grammy nominee Corey Crowder. The album featured the top-10 singles "Stompin' Ground", "Slow Burn", "Slide Over", and "Forever Rebels".

In 2017 Hicks headlined his second nationwide tour, called the Shake These Walls Tour.

CMT TV aired a special on the Shake These Walls Tour titled Tim Hicks Sudbury Sunday Night. The special was nominated for a CCMA Award and Certified for two CIMA Road Gold Awards.

=== New Tattoo and Get Loud Tour ===
In 2018, Hicks was presented with the first Nielsen Compass Award at the Country Music Association of Ontario Awards. He won the award again in 2019.

In March 2018, Hicks joined Brantley Gilbert's tour as an opening act throughout Western Canada.

In June 2018, Hicks released his fourth studio album New Tattoo and announced his Get Loud tour. His first single "Loud" from this album was licensed by the NHL across North America. The song was used on Sportsnet and NBC Sports in various promotional segments.

The Get Loud tour was his third headlining national tour in Canada and featured Tebey, Madeline Merlo, and Andrew Hyatt as opening acts. For the tour he partnered with PLUS1 and donated $1 from every ticket sold to the Unison Fund.

His next single from New Tattoo "What a Song Should Do" became his first number 1 song at Canadian country radio. This song also reached number one on Australia’s CMC Chart.

By the end of 2018, it was announced that Hicks was the 7th most played Canadian country artist for that year.

=== Wreck This, Campfire Troubador, Talk to Time, and Going Somewhere ===
In early 2020, Hicks announced the “Wreck This Town World Tour” along with a digital release of Wreck a three-song EP which included the single "No Truck Song". “No Truck Song” was produced by Jeff Coplan and co-written by Hicks, Coplan, and Bruce Wallace. "No Truck Song" became Hicks' second number one single at Canadian country radio. Hicks expanded on his previous EP with a 6-track extended play Wreck This released on June 26, 2020.

In 2021, he released the extended play Campfire Troubador, which included a special edition of the single "The Good, the Bad and the Pretty". He released a new single, "Whiskey Does", in February 2022. On September 2, 2022, Hicks released his fifth studio album Talk to Time, which included the singles "The Good, the Bad and the Pretty", "Whiskey Does", "Dodge Out of Hell", and the title track.

In 2025, Hicks released the single "Going Somewhere". In the spring of 2026, Hicks embarked on his headlining "Going Somewhere Tour" across Canada.

== Discography ==
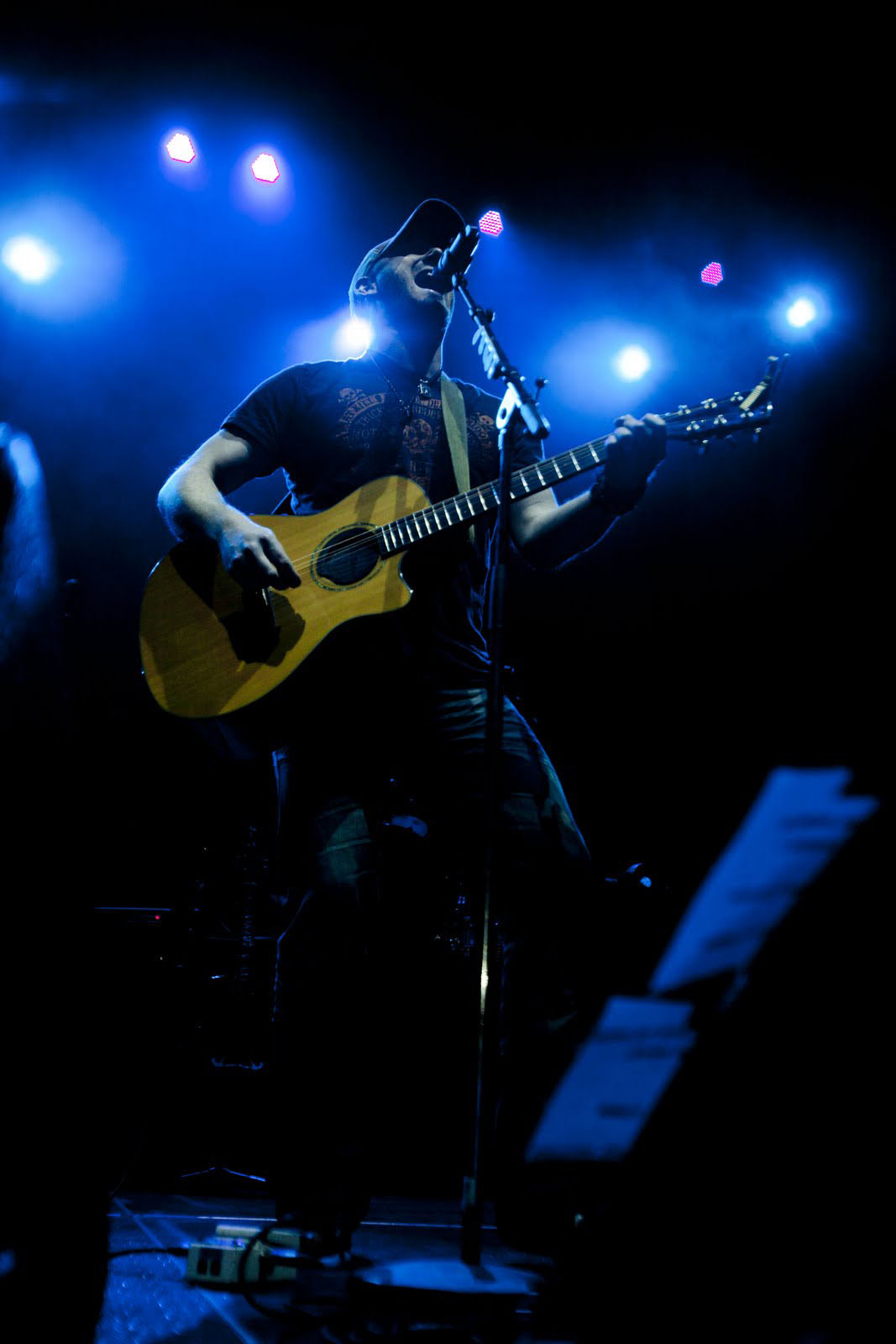
Hicks performing live at CMT Hitlist 2013 tour in GM Centre, Oshawa, Ontario

=== Studio albums ===
Title	Details	Peak positions	Certifications
Title	Details	CAN	Certifications
Throw Down	Release date: August 27, 2013; Label: Open Road	16	MC: Gold
5:01	Release date: August 5, 2014; Label: Open Road	7	
Shake These Walls	Release date: September 9, 2016; Label: Open Road	15	
New Tattoo	Release date: June 22, 2018; Label: Open Road	27	
Talk to Time	Release date: September 2, 2022; Label: Open Road	—	
Going Somewhere	Release date: May 22, 2026; Label: Open Road	—	

=== Live albums ===
Title	Details
Tim Hicks Live	Release date: May 19, 2017; Label: Open Road

=== Extended plays ===
Title	Details	Peak positions
Title	Details	AUS
Tim Hicks	Release date: March 5, 2013; Label: Open Road	94
Wreck This	Release date: June 26, 2020; Label: Open Road	—
Campfire Troubadour	Release date: May 21, 2021; Label: Open Road	—
Campfire Troubadour Vol. 2	Release date: June 2, 2023; Label: Open Road	—

=== Singles ===
==== As lead artist ====
Year	Title	Peak chart positions		Certifications	Album
Year	Title	CAN	CAN Country	Certifications	Album
2012	"Get By"	57	9	MC: Platinum	Throw Down
2013	"Hell Raisin' Good Time"	59	8	MC: Platinum	Throw Down
2013	"Buzz, Buzz, Buzzing"	94	8		Throw Down
2014	"Got a Feeling" (featuring Blackjack Billy)	62	14	MC: Gold	Throw Down
2014	"Here Comes the Thunder"	69	10	MC: Gold	5:01
2014	"She Don't Drink Whiskey Anymore"	91	10		5:01
2015	"So Do I"	87	8		5:01
2015	"Young, Alive and In Love"	—	11		5:01+
2016	"Stompin' Ground"	—	7	MC: Platinum	Shake These Walls
2016	"Slow Burn"	—	9		Shake These Walls
2017	"Slide Over"	—	2		Shake These Walls
2017	"Forever Rebels"	—	10		Shake These Walls
2018	"Loud"	—	4	MC: Gold	New Tattoo
2018	"The Worst Kind" (featuring Lindsay Ell)	—	17		New Tattoo
2019	"What a Song Should Do"	—	1	MC: Gold	New Tattoo
2020	"No Truck Song"	71	1	MC: Platinum	Wreck This
2020	"Wreck This Town"	—	43		Wreck This
2021	"The Good, the Bad and the Pretty"	—	26		Talk to Time
2022	"Whiskey Does"	—	10		Talk to Time
2022	"Dodge Out of Hell"	—	10		Talk to Time
2023	"Talk to Time"	—	7	MC: Gold	Talk to Time
2023	"Yee to the Haw"	—	30		Talk to Time
2024	"One More"	—	19		Going Somewhere
2025	"Quits"	—	24		Going Somewhere
2025	"Going Somewhere"	—	6		Going Somewhere
2026	"The Pilot"	—	16		Going Somewhere
"—" denotes releases that did not chart

==== As featured artist ====
Year	Title	Peak chart positions	Album
Year	Title	CAN Country	Album
2015	"One Horse Town" (with the Road Hammers)	41	The Squeeze
2024	"Won't Forget" (with Dan Davidson)	—	TBA

=== Other songs ===
Year	Title	Certifications	Album
2013	"Stronger Beer"	MC: 2× Platinum	Throw Down

=== Music videos ===
Year	Title	Director
2013	"Get By"	Jason Lupish
2013	"Hell Raisin' Good Time"	Steven Goldmann
2013	"Buzz, Buzz, Buzzing"	Warren P. Sonoda
2014	"Got a Feeling" (featuring Blackjack Billy)	Adam Rothlein
2014	"Here Comes the Thunder"	Adam Rothlein
2014	"She Don't Drink Whiskey Anymore"	The Edde Brothers
2015	"So Do I"	Brent Bergerson
2015	"Young, Alive and In Love"	
2015	"One Horse Town" (with The Road Hammers)	
2015	"I'll Be Home for Christmas but I'll Be Drunk"	Joel Stewart
2016	"Stompin' Ground"	
2016	"Slow Burn"	Ross Kolton
2017	"Slide Over"	Gavin Michael Booth
2018	"Loud"	Peter Zavadil
2018	"The Worst Kind"	Ben Knechtel
2019	"What a Song Should Do"	Lee Levin / Adam Rothlein
2020	"No Truck Song"	Adam Rothlein
2021	"Slow"	
2022	"Whiskey Does"	Adam Rothlein
2022	"High Rollers"	
2022	"Dodge Out of Hell"	Adam Rothlein
2023	"Talk to Time"	Travis Didluck
2023	"Yee to the Haw"	Corey Kelly
2023	"I Miss Tom Petty"	Adam Rothlein
2024	"One More"	Adam Rothlein
2025	"Quits"	Lee Zavitz
2025	"Going Somewhere"	Jason Lupish

== Awards and nominations ==
Year	Association	Category	Result	Ref.
2013	Canadian Country Music Association	Rising Star	Nominated	
2014	Juno Awards of 2014	Breakthrough Artist of the Year	Nominated	
2014	Juno Awards of 2014	Country Album of the Year – Throw Down	Nominated	
2014	Canadian Country Music Association	Rising Star	Won	
2014	Canadian Country Music Association	Album of the Year – Throw Down	Nominated	
2014	Canadian Country Music Association	Songwriter of the Year – "Hell Raisin' Good Time"	Nominated	
2014	Canadian Country Music Association	CMT Video of the Year – "Got a Feeling"	Nominated	
2014	Country Music Association of Ontario	Male Artist of the Year	Won	
2014	Country Music Association of Ontario	Album of the Year – Throw Down	Nominated	
2014	Country Music Association of Ontario	Single of the Year – "Get By"	Nominated	
2014	Country Music Association of Ontario	Songwriter of the Year – "Get By"	Nominated	
2015	Canadian Country Music Association	Male Artist of the Year	Nominated	
2015	Canadian Country Music Association	Album of the Year – 5:01	Nominated	
2015	Canadian Country Music Association	Interactive Artist of the Year	Nominated	
2015	Country Music Association of Ontario	Single of the Year – "Here Comes The Thunder"	Nominated	
2015	Country Music Association of Ontario	Video of the Year – "She Don’t Drink Whiskey Anymore"	Nominated	
2015	Country Music Association of Ontario	Songwriter of Year – "Here Comes The Thunder"	Nominated	
2016	Canada Music Week's Live Music Awards	Breakthrough Touring Artist of the Year	Nominated	
2016	Canadian Country Music Association	Interactive Artist of the Year	Nominated	
2016	Country Music Association of Ontario	Fans’ Choice	Nominated	
2016	Country Music Association of Ontario	Male Artist of the Year	Nominated	
2016	Country Music Association of Ontario	Album of the Year – 5:01+	Nominated	
2017	Country Music Association of Ontario	Male artist of the Year	Won	
2017	Country Music Association of Ontario	Album of the Year – Shake These Walls	Nominated	
2017	Country Music Association of Ontario	Songwriter of the Year – "Stompin’ Ground" (with Todd Clark, Gavin Slate and Travis Wood)	Nominated	
2017	Country Music Association of Ontario	Fan's Choice	Nominated	
2017	Canadian Country Music Association	Male Artist of the Year	Nominated	
2017	Canadian Country Music Association	Interactive Artist or Group of the Year	Nominated	
2018	Canadian Country Music Association	Fan's Choice Award	Nominated	
2018	Juno Awards of 2018	Country Album of the Year – Shake These Walls	Nominated	
2018	Country Music Association of Ontario	Fans’ Choice of the Year	Nominated	
2018	Country Music Association of Ontario	Male Artist of the Year	Nominated	
2018	Country Music Association of Ontario	Single of the Year – "Slide Over"	Nominated	
2018	Country Music Association of Ontario	Video of the Year – "Slide Over"	Nominated	
2019	Canada Music Week's Live Music Awards	Video of the Year – "The Worst Kind"	Won	
2019	Juno Awards of 2019	Country Album of the Year – New Tattoo	Nominated	
2019	Canadian Country Music Association	Entertainer of the Year	Nominated	
2019	Canadian Country Music Association	Album of the Year – New Tattoo	Nominated	
2019	Canadian Country Music Association	Fans' Choice Award	Nominated	
2019	Canadian Country Music Association	Male Artist of the Year	Nominated	
2019	Country Music Association of Ontario	Male Artist of the Year	Won	
2019	Country Music Association of Ontario	Fans’ Choice of the Year	Nominated	
2019	Country Music Association of Ontario	Single of the Year – "Loud"	Nominated	
2019	Country Music Association of Ontario	Album of the Year – New Tattoo	Nominated	
2019	Country Music Association of Ontario	Video of the Year – "The Worst Kind"	Nominated	
2019	Country Music Association of Ontario	Songwriter of the Year – "Loud"	Nominated	
2020	Canadian Country Music Association	Songwriter(s) Of The Year – "No Truck Song" (shared with Jeff Coplan, Bruce Wallace)	Nominated	
2020	Canadian Country Music Association	Video Of The Year – "No Truck Song"	Nominated	
2021	Country Music Association of Ontario	Fans' Choice	Nominated	
2021	Country Music Association of Ontario	Male Artist of the Year	Nominated	
2021	Country Music Association of Ontario	Music Video of the Year – "No Truck Song"	Nominated	
2021	Country Music Association of Ontario	Single of the Year – "No Truck Song"	Won	
2021	Country Music Association of Ontario	Songwriter(s) of the Year – "No Truck Song" (with Jeff Coplan, Bruce Wallace)	Nominated	
2021	2021 Canadian Country Music Awards	Single of the Year – "No Truck Song"	Nominated	
2022	Juno Awards of 2022	Country Album of the Year – Campfire Troubador	Nominated	
2022	Country Music Association of Ontario	Album of the Year – Campfire Troubador	Nominated	
2022	Country Music Association of Ontario	Fans' Choice	Won	
2022	Country Music Association of Ontario	Male Artist of the Year	Won	
2022	Canadian Country Music Association	Songwriter(s) of the Year – "Whiskey Does" (with Deric Ruttan, Monty Criswell)	Nominated	
2022	Canadian Country Music Association	Video of the Year – "Whiskey Does"	Nominated	
2023	Country Music Association of Ontario	Album of the Year – Talk to Time	Nominated	
2023	Country Music Association of Ontario	Fans' Choice	Nominated	
2023	Country Music Association of Ontario	Male Artist of the Year	Won	
2023	Country Music Association of Ontario	Songwriter(s) of the Year – "Whiskey Does" (with Deric Ruttan, Monty Criswell)	Nominated	
2023	Canadian Country Music Association	Album of the Year - Talk to Time	Nominated	
2023	Canadian Country Music Association	Fans' Choice	Nominated	
2025	Country Music Association of Ontario	Male Artist of the Year	Nominated	
2025	Country Music Association of Ontario	Songwriter(s) of the Year – "Quits" (with Deric Ruttan, Monty Criswell)	Nominated	
2025	Canadian Country Music Association	Musical Collaboration of the Year — "Won't Forget" (with Dan Davidson, Max Jackson)	Nominated	
