= Here Comes the Thunder =

2014 song by Tim Hicks

Single by Tim Hicks

from the album 5:01
- Released: May 13, 2014
- Genre: Country rock
- Length: 3:07
- Label: Open Road
- Songwriter(s): Tim Hicks; Todd Clark; Gavin Slate
- Producer(s): Jeff Coplan

Tim Hicks singles chronology
"Got a Feeling" (2014)	"Here Comes the Thunder" (2014)	"She Don't Drink Whiskey Anymore" (2014)

Music video
- "Here Comes the Thunder" on YouTube

"Here Comes the Thunder" is a song co-written and recorded by Canadian country artist Tim Hicks. He wrote the track with Todd Clark and Gavin Slate, and it was the lead single off Hicks' second studio album 5:01.

== Commercial performance ==
"Here Comes the Thunder" reached a peak of number ten on the Billboard Canada Country chart for the week of September 13, 2014, marking Hicks' fourth career top ten hit. It also reached a peak of number 69 on the Canadian Hot 100 for the week of July 26, 2014. The song has been certified Gold by Music Canada.

== Music video ==
The official music video for "No Truck Song" premiered on May 30, 2014, and was directed by Adam Rothlein. The video includes a race scene and part of a concert, both filmed in Nashville, Tennessee. The police were called during the filming of one scene due to a misunderstanding regarding peel outs, although no one was arrested.

== Charts ==
Chart (2014)	Peak position
Canada (Canadian Hot 100)	69
Canada Country (Billboard)	10

== Certifications ==
Region	Certification	Certified units/sales
Canada (Music Canada)	Gold	40,000^{*}
^{*} Sales figures based on certification alone.
