= What a Song Should Do =

Single by Tim Hicks

from the album New Tattoo
- Released: April 8, 2019
- Genre: Country
- Length: 3:57
- Label: Open Road
- Songwriters: Tim Hicks; Emily Doty; Karen Kosowski
- Producer: Jeff Coplan

Tim Hicks singles chronology
"The Worst Kind" (2018)	"What a Song Should Do" (2019)	"No Truck Song" (2020)

Music video
- "What A Song Should Do" on YouTube

"What a Song Should Do" is a song co-written and recorded by Canadian country artist Tim Hicks. The track was co-written with Emily Doty and Karen Kosowski, while Jeff Coplan produced the track. The track was the third single off Hicks' fourth studio album New Tattoo.

== Critical reception ==
Top Country named "What a Song Should Do" as "Pick of the Week" referring to it as a "powerful song that Tim Hicks fans will be raising their glasses to for years to come", and stating "every lyric resonates while the melody pulls you in further, making this song a true hit".

== Commercial performance ==
"What a Song Should Do" was certified gold by Music Canada on July 30, 2020, with over 40,000 sales. It reached a peak of #1 on the Billboard Canada Country chart dated June 15, 2019 becoming Hicks' first #1 hit. It also reached #1 on the CMC chart in Australia, becoming Hicks' first Australian chart-topper.

== Music video ==
The official music video for "What a Song Should Do" premiered on April 22, 2019 and was directed and produced by Adam Rothlein. Front Porch Music stated that the video "has a vibe that makes you want to jump in the back of that convertible two of the characters are driving and feel the wind blowing across your face".

== Charts ==
Chart (2019)	Peak position
Canada Country (Billboard)	1

== Certifications ==
Region	Certification	Certified units/sales
Canada (Music Canada)	Gold	40,000^{‡}
^{‡} Sales+streaming figures based on certification alone.
