= Runnin' Out of Air =

Single by Love and Theft

from the album Love and Theft
- Released: November 5, 2012
- Genre: Country
- Length: 3:20
- Label: RCA Nashville
- Songwriter(s): Matt Jenkins; Shane McAnally; Josh Osborne
- Producer(s): Josh Leo

Love and Theft singles chronology
"Angel Eyes" (2011)	"Runnin' Out of Air" (2012)	"If You Ever Get Lonely" (2013)

"Runnin' Out of Air" is a song recorded by American country music duo Love and Theft. It was released in November 2012 as the second single from their second studio album, Love and Theft. The song was written by Matt Jenkins, Shane McAnally and Josh Osborne.

== Critical reception ==
Billy Dukes of Taste of Country gave the song four-and-a-half stars out of five, comparing it to "a busted piñata that just keeps giving sweet goodness". Dukes wrote that "even traditionalists won’t be able to keep from tapping a boot when the first hit of the snare drum melts into a funky guitar lick that sets the mood for what’s to come. […] Add guitar, piano, mandolin and effortless harmonies, and you have a single that bursts out of the speakers." He predicted that "by embracing everything great about artists like Rascal Flatts and Taylor Swift while adding their own unique sounds, they’ve created a single radio will still be playing years from now." In his review of the album, Matt Bjorke of Roughstock wrote that the song "feels like another potential hit with the moody, swampy melody being accentuated with mandolins and b-3 in Josh Leo's production mix a long with a little cow bell". Bjorke felt that it was "a nice play on love lost and the sadness that can accompany those emotions".

== Music video ==
The music video was directed by Mason Dixon and premiered in November 2012. It features the band performing in a club to an audience of mainly female fans, and each member separately in a different darkened room being seduced by 3 women each.

== Chart performance ==
"Runnin' Out of Air" debuted at number 60 on the U.S. Billboard Country Airplay chart for the week of November 24, 2012. It also debuted at number 50 on the U.S. Billboard Hot Country Songs chart for the week of February 2, 2013.

Chart (2012–2013)	Peak position
US Country Airplay (Billboard)	35
US Hot Country Songs (Billboard)	38
