= No Truck Song =

2020 song by Tim Hicks

Single by Tim Hicks

from the EP Wreck This
- Released: April 1, 2020
- Genre: Country rock
- Length: 2:12
- Label: Open Road; UMA
- Songwriter(s): Tim Hicks; Bruce Wallace; Jeff Coplan
- Producer(s): Jeff Coplan

Tim Hicks singles chronology
"What A Song Should Do" (2019)	"No Truck Song" (2020)	"Wreck This Town" (2020)

Music video
- "No Truck Song" on YouTube

"No Truck Song" is a song co-written and recorded by Canadian country artist Tim Hicks. The track was co-written by Bruce Wallace and Jeff Coplan who produced the track. The track is the lead single off Hicks' EP Wreck This.

== Background ==
Hicks said: "On every album I usually add one or two songs that are a little tongue-in-cheek, designed to give fans (and me!) a chuckle, but we’ve never released one as a single before. We smiled and laughed a lot while we wrote it, so I hope fans hear that, and it makes them do the same".

== Commercial performance ==
"No Truck Song" was certified Gold by Music Canada on October 7, 2020, with over 40,000 sales, and later achieved a Platinum certification in 2023. It reached a peak of #1 on the Billboard Canada Country chart dated July 4, 2020, marking Hicks' second chart-topper. It also reached a peak of #71 on the Canadian Hot 100, and #40 on the Australian TMN Country Hot 50.

== Music video ==
The official music video for "No Truck Song" premiered on March 4, 2020 and was directed by Adam Rothlein.

== Charts ==
Chart (2020)	Peak position
Australia Country Hot 50 (TMN)	40
Canada (Canadian Hot 100)	71
Canada Country (Billboard)	1

== Certifications ==
Region	Certification	Certified units/sales
Canada (Music Canada)	Platinum	80,000^{‡}
^{‡} Sales+streaming figures based on certification alone.
