= If You Ever Get Lonely =

Single by Love and Theft

from the album Love and Theft
- Released: June 3, 2013
- Genre: Country
- Length: 3:49
- Label: RCA Nashville
- Songwriter(s): Kyle Cook; Lisa Drew; Michael Dulaney; Steven Dale Jones; John Waite
- Producer(s): Josh Leo

Love and Theft singles chronology
"Runnin' Out of Air" (2012)	"If You Ever Get Lonely" (2013)	"Night That You'll Never Forget" (2014)

"If You Ever Get Lonely" is a song written by Kyle Cook, Lisa Drew, Michael Dulaney, Steven Dale Jones and John Waite. It was originally recorded by Waite on his 2011 album Rough & Tumble and released as the album's first single. It was covered by American country music duo Love and Theft on their second studio album, Love and Theft, in 2012 and released as the album's third single in June 2013.

== Critical reception ==
Markus Papadatos of Digital Journal described the song favorably, saying that "is one of Love and Theft’s best singles that they have released in their career". He described the music video as "melancholic" and praised Liles' lead vocals. Billy Dukes of Taste of Country gave the song one star out of five, stating that "Stephen Barker Liles and Eric Gunderson do little to put their individual marks on the story or production." Dukes wrote that "vocally, Love and Theft spend so much time at their high end, one loses appreciation for it" and "an overripe guitar solo further brings one back to the early ’90s, a time not proudly remembered as bringing the best in pop ballads.

== Music video ==
The music video was directed by Mason Dixon and premiered in July 2013. Filmed entirely in black-and-white, it features footage of the duo on their 2013 tour, as well as them performing the song both on stage, and in the empty audience stands. There is also a subplot of Gunderson texting his wife at home and getting encouragement from Liles to let it go. The duo are also seen in some shots playing rock-paper-scissors in their dressing room.

== Chart performance ==
"If You Ever Get Lonely" debuted at number 53 on the U.S. Billboard Country Airplay chart for the week of June 22, 2013. It also debuted at number 50 on the U.S. Billboard Hot Country Songs chart for the week of November 16, 2013.

Chart (2013)	Peak position
US Country Airplay (Billboard)	34
US Hot Country Songs (Billboard)	43
