= Shake These Walls =

Studio album by Tim Hicks
- Released: September 9, 2016
- Genre: Country
- Length: 32:18
- Labels: Open Road; Universal Canada
- Producer: Todd Clark

Tim Hicks chronology
5:01 (2014)	Shake These Walls (2016)	Tim Hicks Live (2017)

Singles from Shake These Walls
- 1. "Stompin' Ground" Released: June 10, 2016; 2. "Slow Burn" Released: November 9, 2016; 3. "Slide Over" Released: March 28, 2017; 4. "Forever Rebels" Released: August 30, 2017

Shake These Walls is the third studio album from Canadian country music artist Tim Hicks. It was released on September 9, 2016, via Open Road Recordings and Universal Music Canada.

== Track listing ==
No.	Title	Writer(s)	Length
1.	"Shake These Walls"	Tim Hicks; Phil Barton; Jeff Middleton	3:14
2.	"Slow Burn"	Hicks; Todd Clark; Gavin Slate; Travis Wood	3:10
3.	"Stompin' Ground"	Hicks; Clark; Slate; Wood	3:10
4.	"Slide Over"	Hicks; Barton; Corey Crowder	3:10
5.	"We Came Up"	Hicks; Crowder; Jared Mullins	3:04
6.	"Let's Just Drink"	Hicks; Barton; Jason Matthews	3:20
7.	"Don't Make It a Love Song"	Hicks; Deric Ruttan	3:40
8.	"The Night Gets Us"	Hicks; Crowder; Middleton	3:09
9.	"Too Fast"	Hicks; Barton; Lindsay Rimes	3:11
10.	"Forever Rebels"	Hicks; Matt Nolan; Derrick Southerland	3:10
Total length:			32:18

== Charts ==
=== Album ===
Chart (2016)	Peak position
Canadian Albums (Billboard)	15

=== Singles ===
Year	Single	Peak chart positions
Year	Single	CAN Country
2016	"Stompin' Ground"	7
2016	"Slow Burn"	9
2017	"Slide Over"	2
2017	"Forever Rebels"	15
"—" denotes releases that did not chart
