= Angel Eyes (Love and Theft song) =

Single by Love and Theft

from the album Love and Theft
- Released: November 14, 2011
- Recorded: 2011
- Genre: Country
- Length: 3:06
- Label: RCA Nashville
- Songwriters: Jeff Coplan; Eric Gunderson; Eric Paslay
- Producer: Josh Leo

Love and Theft singles chronology
"Dancing in Circles" (2009)	"Angel Eyes" (2011)	"Runnin' Out of Air" (2012)

Music video
- "Angel Eyes" on YouTube

"Angel Eyes" is a song recorded by American country music duo Love and Theft. Eric Gunderson, one-half of the duo, co-wrote it with Jeff Coplan and Eric Paslay. The song was released in November 2011 as the band's first single without group member Brian Bandas, and the first from their self-titled album. It also became their second Top 10 single and their first and only number one hit on the U.S. Billboard Hot Country Songs chart.

== Content ==
The song is about a rebellious female lover who is described as having "a little bit of devil in her angel eyes". Paslay told Taste of Country that the song's title came out in conversation, and that he "just wanted to make sure it didn’t sound too serious on that song." "It’s a fun song," Paslay said. "I’m glad that they recorded it and that it’s out there."

== Critical reception ==
Taste of Country writer Billy Dukes gave the song three stars out of five, saying that its story has "been told thousand of times before" but that it is "still really difficult to resist". Bobby Peacock of Roughstock rated it four stars out of five, saying that its sound was "fresh and interesting."

== Music video ==
Directed by Chris Hicky, the video features the duo falling for two different girls: Eric picks up a brunette-haired woman wearing a leather jacket and a pair of jeans (who carries a flask with her) at a stable on his motorcycle. Stephen picks up a blonde-haired woman wearing a white long coat and scarf with a skirt at her house in his Ford Mustang. They both reach a late-night outdoor party where they meet their friends and hang out by drinking beer and dancing near the campfire. The video ends with the duo taking their respective dates to the same church and revealing that the women are possibly sisters as well as Preacher's daughters. The girls are played by Chicago-based model and musician, Erin Gipson.

== Chart performance ==
On the week of August 25, 2012, "Angel Eyes" became Love and Theft's only number-one single.

Chart (2011–2012)	Peak position
Canada Hot 100 (Billboard)	68
US Billboard Hot 100	32
US Hot Country Songs (Billboard)	1

=== Year-end charts ===
Chart (2012)	Position
US Country Songs (Billboard)	21

== Certifications ==
Region	Certification	Certified units/sales
United States (RIAA)	Platinum	1,000,000^{^}
^{^} Shipments figures based on certification alone.
