= Blackjack Billy =

US musical group

- Origin: Nashville, Tennessee, U.S.
- Genres: Country rock
- Years active: 2012–present
- Labels: Independent; Open Road
- Members: Noll Billings; Jeff Coplan; Weston Jordan; Clayton Shay
- Past members: Rob Blackledge; Patrick Cornell; Ian Munsick; Brad Cummings
- Website: blackjackbilly.com

Blackjack Billy is an American country rock group composed of Noll Billings (vocals), Clayton Shay (vocals, bass guitar), Jeff Coplan (electric guitar), and Weston Jordan (drums). Based in Nashville, they describe their music as "Redneck Rock." Their debut single, "The Booze Cruise," was independently released in March 2013.

SiriusXM satellite radio's new country channel "The Highway" began playing "The Booze Cruise" as a Highway "Find." It's cited as the biggest-selling song on iTunes by any band without a major record deal in the first half of 2013. As of Aug 12, 2013, the song has sold more than 100K in the US and more than 150K worldwide. It reached platinum status in Canada and Australia.

Billy Dukes of Taste of Country gave "The Booze Cruise" four stars out of five, writing that "clever lyrics and a melody that grabs your attention like that hottie oiling up with sunblock make this an easy song to finish before you realize you’ve begun." The song was written by Noll Billings, Jeff Coplan and Chuck Jones on August 24, 2011. A writing session was set for that very hot summer day in Nashville, when Billings said that a fun way to spend that day would be to get on a booze cruise. The song was written in 45 minutes.

The single "Drinking all weekend" was released in 2020.

== Founders ==
Rob Blackledge is originally from Madison, Mississippi and toured as a solo artist while attending the Mike Curb College of Entertainment & Music Business at Belmont University in Nashville, Tennessee. Blackledge co-wrote Love & Theft's first top 10 single "Runaway" with LNT's Stephen Barker Liles and Canaan Smith. (Liles is a musician often cited as the inspiration for Taylor Swift's song "Hey Stephen," from her second studio album "Fearless.") "Runaway" reached No. 10 on the Billboard Hot Country Songs chart.

Noll Billings is originally from Kennett, Missouri and while pursuing a solo career, he signed a publishing deal as a songwriter with EMI Music Group.

Jeff Coplan is originally from Montreal, Quebec, Canada, and lived in New York before relocating to Nashville. Coplan is a songwriter and musician who began producing and engineering projects for others; including Bowling for Soup, Love and Theft, and Tim Hicks. Coplan, together with Robert Ellis Orrall, developed the group Love and Theft and produced their first album. Coplan also co-wrote their #1 hit Angel Eyes with LNT's Eric Gunderson and Eric Paslay. Coplan jumped back onstage with Blackjack Billy, and publishing company is Roots Three Music/Ole.

The three met in Nashville and began writing songs together. Blackjack Billy band members are considered a part of the so-called "young crop" of country artists finding success; Coplan and Blackledge were on a softball team from 2009-2010 together with Gunderson and Liles of Love and Theft, Tyler Hubbard of Florida Georgia Line and Canaan Smith.

Brad Cummings joined in 2012. Cummings is originally from Hendersonville, Tennessee, and previous played drums for Randy Houser and Bobby Bare Jr.

== Discography ==
=== Studio albums ===
Title	Details
Rebel Child	Release date: September 19, 2014; Label: Blackjack Billy

=== Extended plays ===
Title	Details	Peak positions
Title	Details	US Heat
Get Some	Release date: November 19, 2013; Label: Bigger Picture Music Group	25

=== Singles ===
Year	Single	Peak chart positions				Certifications	Album
Year	Single	US Country	US Country Airplay	CAN Country	CAN	Certifications	Album
2013	"The Booze Cruise"	46	—	31	41	MC: Platinum	Get Some
2013	"Get Some"	—	55	—	—		Get Some
2014	"Blood, Sweat and Beer"	—	—	—	—		Get Some
2014	"Sugar Cane"	—	—	—	—		Rebel Child
2014	"Run" (with The Road Hammers and Doc Walker)	—	—	35	—		TBD
2015	"Why God Made Summertime"	—	—	—	—		TBD
2015	"Night Light"	—	—	—	—		TBD
2016	"Tread"	—	—	—	—		TBD
"—" denotes releases that did not chart

=== Music videos ===
Year	Video	Director
2012	"Born to Ride"	
2013	"The Booze Cruise"	Aaron Thomas
2014	"Got a Feeling" (with Tim Hicks)	Adam Rothlein
2014	"Run" (with The Road Hammers and Doc Walker)	
2016	"Tread"	

== Awards and nominations ==
Year	Association	Category	Result
2014	Canadian Country Music Association	CMT Video of the Year – "Got a Feeling"	Nominated
