= Stompin' Ground =

2016 song by Tim Hicks

Single by Tim Hicks

from the album Shake These Walls
- Released: June 10, 2016
- Genre: Country rock
- Length: 3:10
- Label: Open Road
- Songwriters: Tim Hicks; Todd Clark; Gavin Slate; Travis Wood
- Producer: Todd Clark

Tim Hicks singles chronology
"Young, Alive and In Love" (2015)	"Stompin' Ground" (2016)	"Slow Burn" (2016)

Music video
- "Stompin' Ground" on YouTube

"Stompin' Ground" is a song recorded by Canadian country rock artist Tim Hicks. He co-wrote the song with Todd Clark, Gavin Slate, and Travis Wood. It was the lead single off Hicks' third studio album Shake These Walls.

== Background ==
In a press release, Hicks stated that "Stompin' Ground" is "a definite reflection of my need to constantly push my own limits personally and the limits of my music in general."

== Commercial performance ==
"Stompin' Ground" reached a peak of number seven on the Billboard Canada Country chart for the week of October 15, 2016. This marked a new career-highest charting entry for Hicks. The song has since been certified Platinum by Music Canada.

== Music video ==
The official music video for "Stompin' Ground" premiered on YouTube on July 21, 2016. It features Hicks and his band performing the song in an outdoor setting, while other people act out scenes from the song's lyrics, intended to reflect Hicks’ upbringing. The video was filmed in Niagara Falls, Ontario, where Hicks grew up. Some scenes were filmed at his cousin's house, while one scene features his grandmother’s house. There is also a scene where a boy rides a bike down the same path Hicks used to deliver newspapers on as a kid.

== Charts ==
Chart performance for "Stompin' Ground"
Chart (2016)	Peak position
Canada Country (Billboard)	7

== Certifications ==
Region	Certification	Certified units/sales
Canada (Music Canada)	Platinum	80,000^{‡}
^{‡} Sales+streaming figures based on certification alone.
