= Love and Theft (duo) =

American country music duo

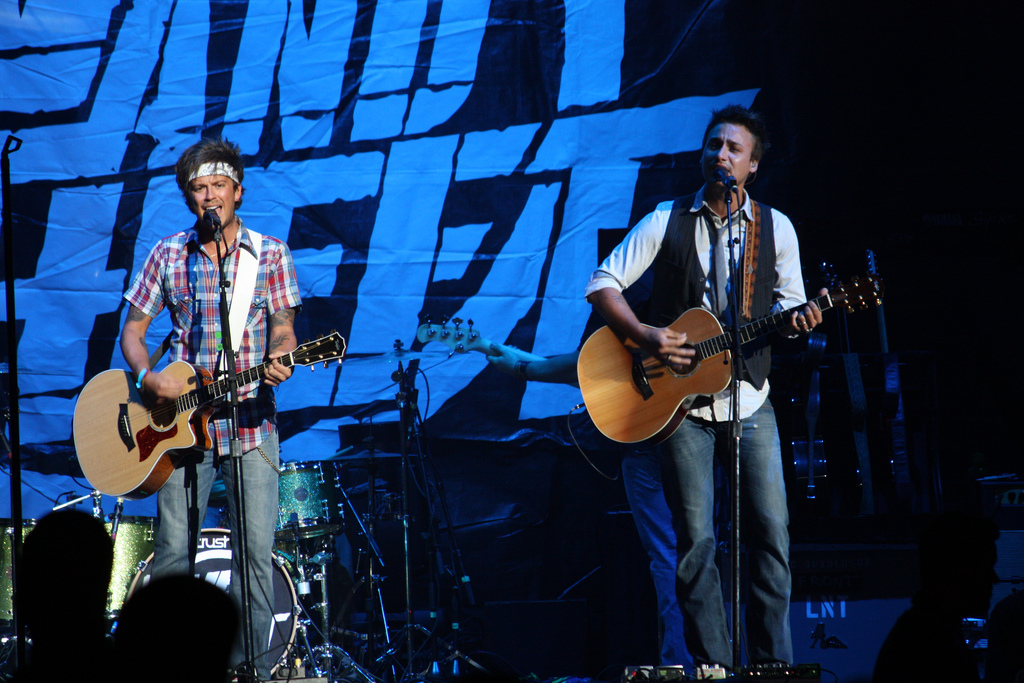
- Love and Theft performing in Mount Pleasant, South Carolina. Stephen Barker Liles (left) and Eric Gunderson

Background information
- Origin: Nashville, Tennessee, U.S.
- Genre: Country
- Years active: 2006–present
- Labels: Carolwood/Lyric Street; RCA Nashville; Hate and Purchase; Curb
- Members: Eric Gunderson Stephen Barker Liles
- Past members: Brian Bandas
- Website: Official website

Love and Theft is an American country music duo consisting of vocalists Eric Gunderson and Stephen Barker Liles. They originally recorded as a trio with vocalist Brian Bandas; after he exited the band, Gunderson and Liles continued as a duo. Signed to Lyric Street Records subsidiary Carolwood Records in 2009, Love and Theft made their chart debut in early 2009 with the single "Runaway," which reached the Top 10 on Billboard Hot Country Songs. The band's debut album, World Wide Open, was released on August 25, 2009.

In 2011, following the departure of Bandas, Love and Theft continued as a duo consisting of Gunderson and Liles. The duo moved to RCA Records Nashville that year and released the single "Angel Eyes", which became their first number 1 single. It and the Top 40 singles "Runnin' Out of Air" and "If You Ever Get Lonely" all appear on their second, self-titled album. A third album, Whiskey on My Breath, followed in 2015.

== Musical career ==
Love and Theft was formed in 2006 by Brian Bandas, Stephen Barker Liles, and Eric Gunderson, all three of whom alternated on lead vocals. After performing before ASCAP executives, they were recommended to an A&R executive for Lyric Street Records, who signed them to Lyric Street's sister label Carolwood Records in 2009. Just prior, they were also signed as an opening act for Taylor Swift's 2008 tour. Liles is the subject of "Hey Stephen" which appears on Swift's 2008 album Fearless. He also co-wrote the track "Wrong Baby Wrong Baby Wrong" on Martina McBride's 2009 album Shine. "Kissin' in Cars," which was featured on the soundtrack for the film Country Strong, was also co-written by Liles.

Love and Theft made their first Grand Ole Opry performance on March 28, 2009, shortly before the release of the debut single "Runaway." This song was written by Stephen Barker Liles, Canaan Smith, and Rob Blackledge of Blackjack Billy, and is included on the band's debut album, World Wide Open. The album entered at No. 10 on the Country chart, selling 12,500 copies in its first week. In addition, Love and Theft recorded a video for "Don't Wake Me," another cut from the album. "Runaway" peaked at number 10 on the country chart in November 2009, shortly before Carolwood was consolidated with Lyric Street. "Dancing in Circles" was released as the album's second single in December 2009, and reached a peak of number 25 in March 2010. On April 14, Disney Music Group announced the closure of Lyric Street Records, leaving Love and Theft without a record deal.

Love and Theft became a duo in 2011 after founding member Brian Bandas left the band. The remaining two members then signed with RCA Nashville in 2011. "Angel Eyes" was digitally released on November 8, 2011, and released to radio six days later. In August 2012, "Angel Eyes" became Love and Theft's first and only Number One single on the Hot Country Songs chart. It was the lead single from their self-titled album, which was released via RCA on July 24, 2012. The album's second and third singles, "Runnin' Out of Air and "If You Ever Get Lonely," were both minor Top 40 hits on the Billboard Country Airplay charts.

The duo released "Night That You'll Never Forget" in early 2014 as the lead single to an upcoming third album. It reached a peak of number 34 on the Billboard Country Airplay charts and in October 2014, it was announced that Love and Theft had parted ways with Sony Music Nashville. Almost an entire second album was lost (including "Going Out Like That," which Reba cut in 2015), the songs untouchable for five years, unless Stephen and Eric paid the hefty price of $13,000 for each song. They self-released "Whiskey on My Breath" via Hate & Purchase Music later in the year, and their third studio album, also titled Whiskey on My Breath, was released on February 10, 2015. Their Can't Wait For the Weekend tour took place 2015-2016, taking place throughout the United States.

In March 2016, Love and Theft signed a new record deal with Curb Records, which immediately re-issued their previous single, "Whiskey on My Breath," to country radio. "Candyland" was released to country radio on October 10, 2016, and peaked at number 55 on Billboard Country Airplay. Love and Theft recorded for Curb Records through 2019, but on December 1, 2023, Curb finally issued Need to Breathe, Love and Theft's fourth studio album.

== Personal lives ==
Gunderson married Emily Hagar in 2010. The couple had their first baby on March 10, 2013, a boy named Camden William. Stephen Barker Liles got engaged to Jenna Michelle Kennedy on May 28, 2013. They have two children. Liles and Kennedy married Aug 24, 2014.

== Discography ==
Love and Theft discography
- Studio albums: 3
- Extended plays: 1
- Singles: 9
- Music videos: 9
- #1 Singles: 1

=== Studio albums ===
Title	Album details	Peak chart positions			Sales
Title	Album details	US Country	US	US Indie	Sales
World Wide Open	Release date: August 25, 2009; Label: Carolwood Records; Formats: CD, music download	10	36	—	
Love and Theft	Release date: July 24, 2012; Label: RCA Nashville; Formats: CD, music download	4	21	—	US: 96,000
Whiskey on My Breath	Release date: February 10, 2015; Label: Hate & Purchase Music; Formats: CD, music download	26	—	16	US: 6,200
Need to Breathe	Release date: December 1, 2023; Label: Curb; Formats: CD, music download	—	—	—	
"—" denotes releases that did not chart

=== Extended plays ===
Title	Album details
Live in Savannah	Release date: September 30, 2008; Label: Lyric Street Records; Formats: CD, music download

=== Singles ===
Year	Single	Peak chart positions				Certifications /Sales	Album
Year	Single	US Country	US Country Airplay	US	CAN	Certifications /Sales	Album
2009	"Runaway"	10		65	—		World Wide Open
2009	"Dancing in Circles"	25		—	—		World Wide Open
2011	"Angel Eyes"	1		32	68	US: Platinum	Love and Theft
2012	"Runnin' Out of Air"	38	35	—	—		Love and Theft
2013	"If You Ever Get Lonely"	43	34	—	—		Love and Theft
2014	"Night That You'll Never Forget"	38	34	—	—		—N/a
2014	"Whiskey on My Breath"	31	42	—	—	US: 114,000	Whiskey on My Breath
2016	"Candyland"	—	55	—	—		—N/a
2018	"You Didn't Want Me"	—	—	—	—		Need to Breathe
"—" denotes releases that did not chart

=== Music videos ===
Year	Video	Director
2009	"Don't Wake Me"	Devin Pense
2009	"Runaway"	Kristin Barlowe
2009	"Dancing in Circles"	Kristin Barlowe
2012	"Angel Eyes"	Chris Hicky
2012	"Runnin' Out of Air"	Mason Dixon
2013	"If You Ever Get Lonely"	Mason Dixon
2014	"Night That You'll Never Forget"	Mason Dixon
2015	"Whiskey on My Breath"	
2018	"You Didn't Want Me"	

=== Awards and nominations ===
Year	Association	Category	Nominated work	Result
2012	Country Music Association Awards	New Artist of the Year	—N/a	Nominated
2012	Country Music Association Awards	Vocal Duo of the Year	—N/a	Nominated
2013	Academy of Country Music Awards	Top New Vocal Duo/Group	—N/a	Nominated
2013	Academy of Country Music Awards	Top Vocal Duo	—N/a	Nominated
2013	CMT Music Awards	Duo Video of the Year	"Runnin' Out of Air"	Nominated
