= Love and Theft (Love and Theft album) =

Studio album by Love and Theft
- Released: July 24, 2012
- Genre: Country
- Length: 38:47
- Label: RCA Nashville
- Producer: Josh Leo

Love and Theft chronology
| World Wide Open (2009) | Love and Theft (2012) | Whiskey on My Breath (2015) |

Singles from Love and Theft
- 1. "Angel Eyes" Released: November 14, 2011; 2. "Runnin' Out of Air" Released: November 5, 2012; 3. "If You Ever Get Lonely" Released: June 3, 2013

Professional ratings
Review scores
| Source | Rating |
|---|---|
| Allmusic | 3/5 stars |

Love and Theft is the second studio album by the American country music duo Love and Theft (duo). It was released on July 24, 2012, via RCA Nashville. The album includes the number 1 single "Angel Eyes." The album's second single, "Runnin' Out of Air," was released to country radio in November 2012. The album's third single, "If You Ever Get Lonely", was released to country radio on June 3, 2013. This song was originally recorded by John Waite on his 2011 album Rough & Tumble.

The album debuted at No. 21 on Billboard 200 and No. 4 on Top Country Albums, with 14,000 copies sold in its first week. The album has sold 96,000 copies as of February 2015.

== Track listing ==
| No. | Title | Writer(s) | Length |
|---|---|---|---|
| 1. | "Angel Eyes" | Jeff Coplan, Eric Gunderson, Eric Paslay | 3:06 |
| 2. | "Inside Out" | Stephen Barker Liles, Rodney Clawson, Chris Tompkins | 3:14 |
| 3. | "Runnin' Out of Air" | Matt Jenkins, Shane McAnally, Josh Osborne | 3:20 |
| 4. | "Amen" | Derek George, Neil Thrasher, Bryan White | 3:36 |
| 5. | "If You Ever Get Lonely" | Kyle Cook, Lisa Drew, Michael Dulaney, Steven Dale Jones, John Waite | 3:49 |
| 6. | "Thinking of You (and Me)" | Jones, Cory Batten | 3:25 |
| 7. | "Town Drunk" | Natalie Hemby, Daniel Tashian | 4:10 |
| 8. | "Real Good Sign" | Rivers Rutherford, Gunderson, Josh Leo | 3:23 |
| 9. | "She's Amazing" | Dulaney, Jenkins, Jason Sellers | 3:25 |
| 10. | "Girls Love to Shake It" | Gunderson, James T. Slater, busbee | 3:20 |
| 11. | "Girls Look Hot in Trucks" | Brett Warren, Brad Warren, Gunderson, Liles | 3:59 |

== Personnel ==
Love and Theft

- Stephen Barker Liles - lead vocals, background vocals
- Eric Gunderson - lead vocals, background vocals

Additional Musicians

- Tom Bukovac - electric guitar
- John Catchings - cello
- Smith Curry - dobro, steel guitar, lap steel guitar
- Eric Darken - percussion
- Dan Dugmore - steel guitar
- Shannon Forrest - drums
- Larry Franklin - fiddle
- Tony Harrell - keyboards, synthesizer strings
- Josh Leo - acoustic guitar, electric guitar, lap steel guitar
- Michael Rhodes - bass guitar
- Ilya Toshinsky - acoustic guitar, mandolin
- Nir Z. - drums

== Chart performance ==
=== Album ===
| Chart (2012) | Peak position |
|---|---|
| US Billboard 200 | 21 |
| US Billboard Top Country Albums | 4 |

=== Singles ===
| Year | Single | Peak chart positions | | | |
| Year | Single | US Country | US Country Airplay | US | CAN |
|---|---|---|---|---|---|
| 2011 | "Angel Eyes" | 1 | — | 32 | 68 |
| 2012 | "Runnin' Out of Air" | 38 | 35 | — | — |
| 2013 | "If You Ever Get Lonely" | 43 | 34 | — | — |
"—" denotes releases that did not chart
