= Stamping Ground (dance festival) =

Semi-annual dance festival

Stamping Ground is the name of a semi-annual festival of "dance and action arts" inaugurated in the town of Bellingen, New South Wales, Australia during 1997.

== History and ethos ==
The Stamping Ground Dance Festival was founded by Peter Stock, a former theatre & television dancer, theatrical director and producer as well as a dance teacher, adjudicator and administrator, in order to encourage male children and adolescents to experience dance and related performance skills.

Stock described the 1997 Stamping Ground as "a gathering for all men and youths illuminating the athletic and creative qualities of the movement arts... questioning the ownership of the dance and challenging destructive ideas, fears and compulsory attitudes which inhibit the personal development of men."

For the first several years the Stamping Ground event ran for periods of 10, 14 and 16 days and was attended almost exclusively by males, but by the early 2000s an increasing number of women and girls were beginning to take part. As of 2006 the festival had been shortened to two weeks plus an additional period of five days devoted to "professional development" courses and the gender balance of attendees was about equal. Several female tutors ran specialised classes within the 2006 event.

As of 2009, the Stamping Ground is Australia's oldest, and one of its largest, dance and performance festivals, typically attracting a faculty of between twenty and forty teachers and between three and five hundred participants.

== Organisation and pedagogy ==
Stamping Ground tutors are invited to submit proposals for courses in a wide range of disciplines including numerous forms of dance, martial arts, circus skills, music and forms of physical theatre as well as for performance projects. A variety of curricular formats have been offered at different conferences, including one-off classes in specialised subjects, progressive classes that build in complexity over a period of days and skill-sharing sessions in which experts in different disciplines compare approaches and techniques.

Participants at the Stamping Ground festival do not undertake practical examinations in the material that they have studied. Rather, the emphasis is placed almost entirely upon the classwork itself and upon the performance outcomes of a given course of study.

The festival operates numerous simultaneous classes throughout Bellingen township, including both indoor and outdoor venues. Some classes are restricted by age and/or gender, others are open to all participants. A number of public performances are offered in the evenings, especially towards the end of the festival. In addition, the Stamping Ground hosts a series of ceremonial events, often inspired by the ceremonies and rituals of archaic and/or tribal cultures.
