= Montgomery Gentry discography =

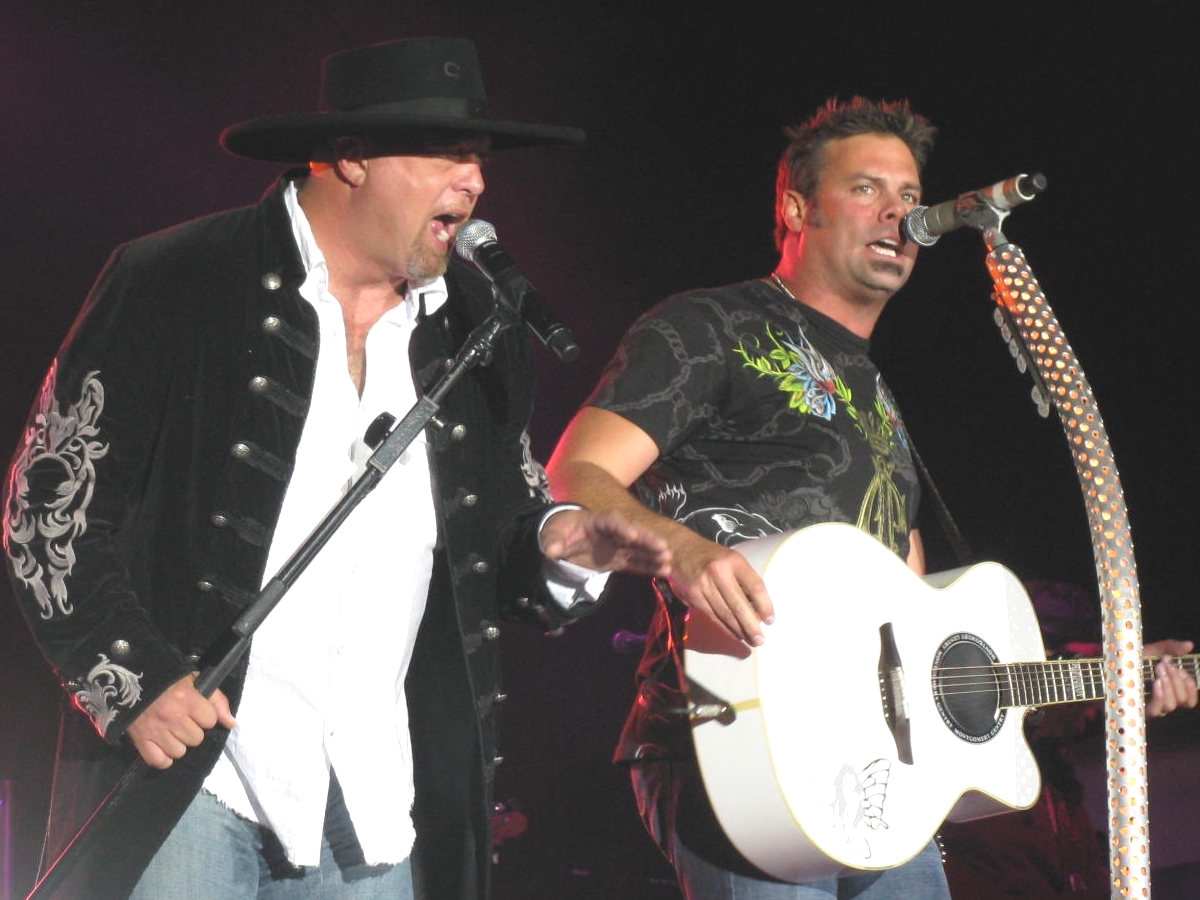
- Eddie Montgomery (left) and Troy Gentry
- Studio albums: 10
- Extended plays: 2
- Compilation albums: 6
- Singles: 38
- Music videos: 26
- Other charted songs: 1

Montgomery Gentry is an American country music duo founded by Eddie Montgomery and Troy Gentry. Its discography comprises 10 studio albums, six compilation albums, two extended plays, and 38 singles. The duo made its debut in 1999 with the single "Hillbilly Shoes," which went to number 13 on the Hot Country Songs charts, but did not reach number one until mid-2004, with "If You Ever Stop Loving Me." The duo has sent four more singles to Number One for a total of five: "Something to Be Proud Of" (2005), "Lucky Man" (2007), "Back When I Knew It All", and "Roll with Me" (both 2008). Besides these, Montgomery Gentry has reached the Top 10 with 10 additional hit singles. All 15 of these songs have charted on the Billboard Hot 100, where the duo's highest peak is "If You Ever Stop Loving Me" at number 30.

Montgomery Gentry's first, third, and fourth albums — 1999's Tattoos & Scars, 2002's My Town and 2004's You Do Your Thing — are all certified platinum by the Recording Industry Association of America (RIAA) for shipments of one million copies. 2001's Carrying On, 2005's Something to Be Proud Of: The Best of 1999–2005, and 2006's Some People Change are all certified gold.

== Studio albums ==
=== 1990s ===
Title	Album details	Peak chart positions				Certifications (sales thresholds)
Title	Album details	US Country	US	US Heat	CAN Country	Certifications (sales thresholds)
Tattoos & Scars	Release date: April 6, 1999; Label: Columbia Nashville; Format: CD, cassette	10	131	2	4	RIAA: Platinum

=== 2000s ===
Title	Album details	Peak chart positions		Certifications (sales thresholds)
Title	Album details	US Country	US	Certifications (sales thresholds)
Carrying On	Release date: May 1, 2001; Label: Columbia Nashville; Formats: CD, cassette	6	49	RIAA: Gold
My Town	Release date: August 27, 2002; Label: Columbia Nashville; Formats: CD	3	26	RIAA: Platinum
You Do Your Thing	Release date: May 18, 2004; Label: Columbia Nashville; Formats: CD, music download	2	10	RIAA: Platinum
Some People Change	Release date: October 24, 2006; Label: Columbia Nashville; Formats: CD, music download	5	23	
Back When I Knew It All	Release date: June 10, 2008; Label: Columbia Nashville; Formats: CD, music download	3	20	

=== 2010s ===
Title	Album details	Peak chart positions			Sales
Title	Album details	US Country	US	US Indie	Sales
Rebels on the Run	Release date: October 18, 2011; Label: Average Joes Entertainment; Formats: CD, music download	9	28	6	
Folks Like Us	Release date: June 9, 2015; Label: Blaster Records; Formats: CD, music download	13	121	6	
Here's to You	Release date: February 2, 2018; Label: Average Joes Entertainment; Formats: CD, music download	3	32	2	US: 20,100
Outskirts (Note: Outskirts was initially issued in digital-only form as a seven song EP. It was later expanded to eleven songs for a CD and "deluxe" digital reissue.)	Release date: November 1, 2019; Label: Average Joes Entertainment; Formats: CD, music download	—	—	46	US: 5,200

== Compilation albums ==
Title	Album details	Peak chart positions		Certifications (sales threshold)
Title	Album details	US Country	US	Certifications (sales threshold)
Something to Be Proud Of: The Best of 1999-2005	Release date: November 1, 2005; Label: Columbia Nashville; Formats: CD, music download	2	20	RIAA: Gold
Super Hits	Release date: November 20, 2007; Label: Columbia Nashville; Formats: CD, music download	—	—	
For Our Heroes	Release date: May 26, 2009; Label: Cracker Barrel; Formats: CD, music download	5	11	
Playlist: The Very Best of Montgomery Gentry	Release date: January 31, 2012; Label: Columbia Nashville; Formats: CD, music download	18	143	
Country: Montgomery Gentry	Release date: 2012; Label: Sony Music Entertainment; Formats: CD, music download	—	—	
20 Years of Hits	Release date: November 16, 2018; Label: Average Joes Entertainment; Formats: CD, music download	—	—	
"—" denotes releases that did not chart

== Extended plays ==
Title	Album details	Peak positions
Title	Album details	US Country
Friends and Family	Release date: October 23, 2012; Label: Average Joes Entertainment; Formats: Music download	53

== Singles ==
=== 1990s and 2000s ===
Year	Single	Peak positions				Certifications	Album
Year	Single	US Country Songs	US	CAN Country (Note: Peak positions from RPM Country Singles in 1999 and 2000, Radio & Records from 2004 to 2005, and Canada Country from 2006 to present.)	CAN	Certifications	Album
1999	"Hillbilly Shoes"	13	62	7	—		Tattoos & Scars
1999	"Lonely and Gone"	5	46	11	—		Tattoos & Scars
1999	"Daddy Won't Sell the Farm"	17	79	19	—		Tattoos & Scars
2000	"Self Made Man"	31	—	50	—		Tattoos & Scars
2000	"All Night Long" (with Charlie Daniels)	31	—	—	—		Tattoos & Scars
2001	"She Couldn't Change Me"	2	37	—	—		Carrying On
2001	"Cold One Comin' On"	23	—	—	—		Carrying On
2002	"Didn't I"	45	—	—	—		We Were Soldiers (soundtrack)
2002	"My Town"	5	40	—	—	RIAA: Gold	My Town
2002	"Speed"	5	47	—	—		My Town
2003	"Hell Yeah"	4	45	—	—	RIAA: Gold	My Town
2004	"If You Ever Stop Loving Me"	1	30	3	—		You Do Your Thing
2004	"You Do Your Thing"	22	—	—	—		You Do Your Thing
2004	"Gone"	3	53	4	—	RIAA: Gold	You Do Your Thing
2005	"Something to Be Proud Of"	1	41	5	—	RIAA: Platinum	You Do Your Thing
2005	"She Don't Tell Me To"	5	62	12	—		Something to Be Proud Of: The Best of 1999-2005
2006	"Some People Change"	7	57	14	—		Some People Change
2007	"Lucky Man"	1	65	10	88		Some People Change
2007	"What Do Ya Think About That"	3	57	8	98		Some People Change
2008	"Back When I Knew It All"	1	56	8	89		Back When I Knew It All
2008	"Roll with Me"	1	33	5	66		Back When I Knew It All
2009	"One in Every Crowd"	5	53	6	71		Back When I Knew It All
2009	"Long Line of Losers"	23	—	34	—		Back When I Knew It All
2009	"Oughta Be More Songs About That"	40	—	—	—		Freedom (unreleased)
"—" denotes releases that did not chart

=== 2010s and 2020s ===
Year	Single	Peak positions				Certifications	Album
Year	Single	US Country Songs	US Country Airplay	US	CAN Country	Certifications	Album
2010	"While You're Still Young"	32		—	—		Hits and More: Life Beside a Gravel Road (unreleased)
2011	"Where I Come From"	8		71	37	RIAA: Platinum	Rebels on the Run
2012	"So Called Life"	45		—	—		Rebels on the Run
2012	"I'll Keep the Kids"	—	38	—	—		Friends and Family
2014	"Headlights"	—	40	—	—		Folks Like Us
2015	"Folks Like Us"	—	49	—	—		Folks Like Us
2017	"Better Me"	40	60	—	—		Here's to You
2018	"Get Down South"	—	—	—	—		Here's to You
2018	"Drink Along Song"	—	—	—	—		Here's to You
2018	"Lucky Man" (featuring Darius Rucker)	—	—	—	—		20 Years of Hits
2019	"King of the World" (featuring Steve Vai)	—	—	—	—		Outskirts
2019	"What Am I Gonna Do (With the Rest of My Life)"	—	—	—	—		Outskirts
2020	"Crazies Welcome"	—	—	—	—		Here's to You
"—" denotes releases that did not chart

=== As a featured artist ===
Year	Single	Album
2017	"Jack in My Coke" (The Lacs featuring Montgomery Gentry)	American Rebelution

== Other charted songs ==
Year	Song	Peak positions	Album
Year	Song	US Country Songs	Album
2000	"Merry Christmas from the Family"	38	B-side of "All Night Long"

== Videography ==
=== Video albums ===
Title	Album details	Certifications
You Do Your Thing: The Video Hits Collection	Release date: 2004; Label: Columbia, Sony Music Home Video; Formats: DVD	RIAA: Gold

=== Music videos ===
Year	Video	Director
1999	"Hillbilly Shoes"	chris rogers [sic]
1999	"Lonely and Gone"	chris rogers [sic]
1999	"Daddy Won't Sell the Farm"	chris rogers [sic]
2000	"All Night Long" (with Charlie Daniels)	Tom Forrest
2001	"She Couldn't Change Me"	Guy Guillet
2001	"Cold One Comin' On"	Guy Guillet
2002	"Didn't I"	Guy Guillet
2002	"My Town"	Guy Guillet
2003	"Speed"	Trey Fanjoy
2003	"Hell Yeah"	Trey Fanjoy
2004	"If You Ever Stop Loving Me"	Trey Fanjoy
2004	"You Do Your Thing"	Michael Salomon
2005	"Gone"	Ivan Dudynsky
2005	"Something to Be Proud Of"	Wes Edwards
2005	"She Don't Tell Me To"	Deb Haus/Jerad Sloan
2006	"Some People Change"	Trey Fanjoy
2007	"What Do Ya Think About That"	Ryan Smith
2008	"Roll with Me"	Steven L. Weaver
2010	"While You're Still Young"	Andy Erwin
2011	"Where I Come From"	Potsy Ponciroli
2012	"So Called Life"	David Poag
2013	"Titty's Beer"	
2015	"Folks Like Us"	Stephen Shepherd
2018	"Get Down South"	
2018	"Drink Along Song"	
2019	"King of the World"	Ed Pryor/Grant Claire
2019	"Outskirts" (live)	
2020	"Crazies Welcome"	Ed Pryor

==== Guest appearances ====
Year	Video	Director
2003	"The Truth About Men" (with Tracy Byrd, Blake Shelton, and Andy Griggs)	Thom Oliphant
