= Something to Be Proud Of: The Best of 1999–2005 =

Greatest hits album by Montgomery Gentry
- Released: November 1, 2005
- Recorded: 1999–2004
- Genre: Country
- Length: 51:22
- Label: Columbia Nashville
- Producer: Various

Montgomery Gentry chronology
You Do Your Thing (2004)	Something to Be Proud Of: The Best of 1999–2005 (2005)	Some People Change (2006)

Singles from Something to Be Proud Of: The Best of 1999-2005
- 1. "She Don't Tell Me To" Released: October 25, 2005

Professional ratings
Review scores
Source	Rating
AllMusic	link

Something to Be Proud Of: The Best of 1999–2005 is the first greatest hits compilation album American by country music duo Montgomery Gentry. It was released in 2005 (see 2005 in country music). The track "She Don't Tell Me To" was newly recorded for this album, and was released as a single. Two other tracks ("Didn't I" and "Merry Christmas from the Family") had previously charted, but not included on any of Montgomery Gentry's studio albums. The former was included on the soundtrack to We Were Soldiers, and the latter was a Christmas single.

== Track listing ==
No.	Title	Writer(s)	Length
1.	"She Don't Tell Me To"	Bob DiPiero, Tom Shapiro, Rivers Rutherford	3:07
2.	"Something to Be Proud Of"	Jeffrey Steele, Chris Wallin	4:16
3.	"Gone"	DiPiero, Steele	4:10
4.	"If You Ever Stop Loving Me"	DiPiero, Shapiro, Rutherford	3:22
5.	"Hell Yeah"	Craig Wiseman, Steele	4:49
6.	"Speed"	Steele, Wallin	3:59
7.	"My Town"	Reed Nielsen, Steele	4:45
8.	"Didn't I"	Anthony Smith	3:42
9.	"She Couldn't Change Me"	Gary Nicholson, Chris Knight	4:20
10.	"Daddy Won't Sell the Farm"	Robin Branda, Steve Fox	4:18
11.	"Lonely and Gone"	Dave Gibson, Bill McCorvey, Greg Crowe	3:19
12.	"Hillbilly Shoes"	Bobby Taylor, Mike Geiger, Woody Mullis	3:12
13.	"Merry Christmas from the Family"	Robert Earl Keen	4:03

== Personnel on "She Don't Tell Me To" ==
- Tom Bukovac - electric guitar
- David Campbell - string arrangements
- Perry Coleman - background vocals
- Dan Dugmore - acoustic guitar
- Troy Gentry - background vocals
- Carl Gorodetzky - string contractor
- Kenny Greenberg - electric guitar
- Eddie Montomery - lead vocals
- Greg Morrow - drums
- The Nashville String Machine - strings
- Russ Pahl - acoustic guitar
- Michael Rhodes - bass guitar
- Reese Wynans - Hammond organ

== Chart performance ==
=== Weekly charts ===
Chart (2005)	Peak position
US Billboard 200	20
US Top Country Albums (Billboard)	2

=== Year-end charts ===
Chart (2006)	Position
US Top Country Albums (Billboard)	36

=== Singles ===
Year	Single	Chart Positions	
Year	Single	US Country	US
2005	"She Don't Tell Me To"	5	62
