= Kevin Fowler discography =

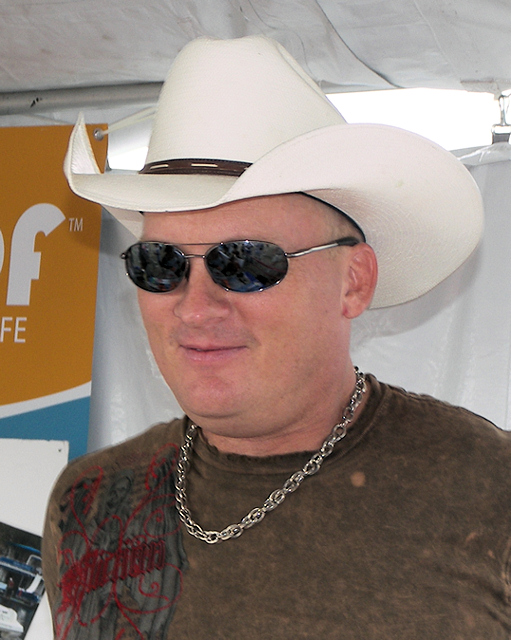
- Studio albums: 9
- Live albums: 1
- Compilation albums: 1
- Singles: 16
- Music videos: 10

Kevin Fowler is an American Texas Country artist. His discography comprises nine studio albums, one compilation album, one live album and sixteen singles.

== Studio albums ==
Title	Details	Peak chart positions			
Title	Details	US Country	US	US Indie	US Heat
One for the Road	Release date: June 3, 1997; Label: Tin Roof Records	—	—	—	—
Beer, Bait & Ammo	Release date: November 21, 2000; Label: Tin Roof Records	—	—	—	—
High on the Hog	Release date: August 6, 2002; Label: Tin Roof Records	54	—	—	—
Loose, Loud & Crazy	Release date: August 3, 2004; Label: Equity Music Group	31	195	13	11
Bring It On	Release date: September 25, 2007; Label: Equity Music Group	14	111	14	2
Chippin' Away	Release date: August 9, 2011; Label: Average Joe's Entertainment	19	81	8	—
How Country Are Ya?	Release date: March 4, 2014; Label: Kevin Fowler Records	9	66	12	—
Coming to a Honky Tonk Near You	Release date: October 21, 2016; Label: Kevin Fowler Records	21	—	33	—
Barstool Stories	Release date: August 23, 2019; Label: Kevin Fowler Records	—	—	—	—
"—" denotes releases that did not chart

== Compilation albums ==
Title	Details	Peak chart positions		
Title	Details	US Country	US Indie	US Heat
Best Of… So Far	Release date: December 7, 2010; Label: Kevin Fowler Records	43	24	4

== Live albums ==
Title	Details
Live at Billy Bob's Texas	Release date: November 5, 2002; Label: Smith Music Group

== Singles ==
Year	Single	Peak positions	Album
Year	Single	US Country	Album
2004	"Ain't Drinkin' Anymore"	49	Loose, Loud & Crazy
2005	"Hard Man to Love"	—	Loose, Loud & Crazy
2005	"Don't Touch My Willie"	—	Loose, Loud & Crazy
2006	"What I Wouldn't Give for Your Love"	—	—
2007	"Long Line of Losers"	—	Bring It On
2008	"Best Mistake I Ever Made"	47	Bring It On
2008	"Cheaper to Keep Her"	—	Bring It On
2010	"Beer Season"	—	Best Of… So Far
2010	"Pound Sign (#?*!)"	34	Best Of… So Far
2011	"Girl in a Truck"	—	Chippin' Away
2011	"Hell Yeah, I Like Beer"	—	Chippin' Away
2011	"That Girl"	45	Chippin' Away
2012	"Here's to Me and You"	—	Chippin' Away
2013	"How Country Are Ya?"	—	How Country Are Ya?
2013	"Love Song"	—	How Country Are Ya?
2016	"Sellout Song" (with Zane Williams)	—	Coming to a Honky Tonk Near You
2018	"Beach Please"	—	Barstool Stories
2019	"Country Song to Sing"	—	Barstool Stories
2019	"Better with a Beer"	—	Barstool Stories
"—" denotes releases that did not chart

== Music videos ==
Year	Video	Director
2005	"Hard Man to Love"	Traci Goudie
2008	"Best Mistake I Ever Made"	Roger Pistole
2010	"Pound Sign (#?*!)"	Kevin Fowler
2010	"Hip Hop in a Honky Tonk" (with Colt Ford)	Wes Edwards
2011	"Hell Yeah, I Like Beer"	Kevin Fowler
2011	"That Girl"	Potsy Ponciroli
2012	"Here's to Me and You"	
2013	"How Country Are Ya?"	Zack Morris
2014	"Love Song"	Phillip Guzman
2014	"Panhandle Poorboy"	Jeff Ray
2015	"Before Somebody Gets Hurt"	
2016	"Sellout Song"	
2016	"Texas Forever"	
2018	"Beach Please"	
2018	"Movin' On"	
