= Friends and Family =

Friends and Family or Friends & Family may refer to:

== Film and television ==
- Friends & Family (film), a 2001 American gay-themed comedy film
- "Friends and Family" (Burn Notice), a television episode
- "Friends & Family" (Schitt's Creek), a television episode
- "Friends and Family" (The Simpsons), a television episode
- “Friends and Family”, an episode of The Good Doctor

== Music ==
- Two compilation albums by Suicidal Tendencies and associated acts:
  - Friends & Family, Vol. 1, 1997
  - Friends & Family, Vol. 2, 2001
- Friends and Family, an EP by Montgomery Gentry, 2012
- "Friends & Family" (song), by Nav, 2020
- "Friends and Family", a song by Trik Turner, 2002

== See also ==
- Friends and Family Test, a UK NHS survey
- Family and Friends, a 1990 Australian TV soap opera
- Family & Friends, a 2011 album by Serengeti
