= High on the Hog =

High on the Hog may refer to:

- High on the Hog (The Band album), 1996
- High on the Hog (Black Oak Arkansas album), 1973
- High on the Hog (Kevin Fowler album), 2002
- High on the Hog (book), a 2011 book by Jessica B. Harris
- High on the Hog: How African American Cuisine Transformed America, a 2021 Netflix docu-series based on the book
