= Here's to You =

Here's to You may refer to:

- "Here's to You" (song), a 1971 song by Joan Baez and Ennio Morricone about the anarchists Sacco and Vanzetti, referred to as "Nicola and Bart"
- "Here's to You", a 2004 song from the Rascal Flatts album Feels Like Today
- Here's to You (David Oliver album)
- Here's to You (Montgomery Gentry album), 2018
