= Chippin' Away (disambiguation) =

Chippin' Away can refer to:

Album

- Chippin' Away, a 2011 music album of Kevin Fowler

Songs

- "Chippin' Away", a song by Night Ranger from Midnight Madness
- "Chippin' Away", a song by Corey Hart from Young Man Running
- "Chippin' Away", a song by Graham Nash
