= Take Care of Texas =

Take Care of Texas is a personal responsibility campaign which provides information on ways to keep air and water clean, conserve water and energy, reduce waste, and save money. The campaign is spearheaded by the Texas Commission on Environmental Quality and is known for its trademarked catchphrase, "Take Care of Texas. It’s the only one we’ve got!"

In June 2013, country music recording artist Kevin Fowler teamed up with Take Care of Texas to produce a public service announcement that promotes outdoor recreation in the state and encourages protection of natural resources.

Take Care of Texas tapped rising country music star Cody Johnson to perform on public service announcements that begin airing on Texas TV stations on May 14, 2018.
