= Self Made Man (song) =

2000 song by Montgomery Gentry

Single by Montgomery Gentry

from the album Tattoos & Scars
- Released: April 22, 2000
- Genre: Country
- Length: 3:35
- Label: Columbia Nashville
- Songwriter(s): Wynn Varble, Jay Knowles
- Producer(s): Joe Scaife

Montgomery Gentry singles chronology
"Daddy Won't Sell the Farm" (1999)	"Self Made Man" (2000)	"All Night Long" (2000)

"Self Made Man" is a song recorded by American country music duo Montgomery Gentry. It was released in April 2000 as the fourth single from the album Tattoos & Scars. The song reached #31 on the Billboard Hot Country Singles & Tracks chart. The song was written by Wynn Varble and Jay Knowles.

== Content ==
The song's subject matter is about how, although a range of factors can be blamed for one's successes and failures, ultimately it is oneself that is to blame for both.

== Critical reception ==
A review in Billboard was positive, contrasting the song with the "hillbilly bluster" of their previous singles while also praising the "regret" in Eddie Montgomery's vocal delivery.

== Chart performance ==
Chart (2000)	Peak position
US Hot Country Songs (Billboard)	31
