= What Do Ya Think About That =

Single by Montgomery Gentry

from the album Some People Change
- Released: July 30, 2007
- Genre: Country
- Length: 3:40 (album version)
- Label: Columbia Nashville
- Songwriters: Anthony Smith, Brett Jones
- Producers: Mark Wright, Jeffrey Steele

Montgomery Gentry singles chronology
"Lucky Man" (2007)	"What Do Ya Think About That" (2007)	"Back When I Knew It All" (2008)

"What Do Ya Think About That" is a song written by Anthony Smith and Brett Jones, and recorded by American country music duo Montgomery Gentry. It was released in July 2007 as the third single from their album Some People Change.

== Content ==
The song is an up-tempo in which the narrator states that he stands by his beliefs, and will not let himself be persuaded by the comments made by his peers ("I don't give a durn what other people think / What do ya think about that?").

== Critical reception ==
Chris Willman described the song negatively in his review, saying that its "defense of the American right to piss off your neighbors" conflicted with the message of the album's title track.

== Official versions ==
- "What Do Ya Think About That" (Album Version) – 3:40

== Chart performance ==
Chart (2007–2008)	Peak position
US Hot Country Songs (Billboard)	3
US Billboard Hot 100	57
Canada Country (Billboard)	8
Canada Hot 100 (Billboard)	98

=== Year-end charts ===
Chart (2008)	Position
US Country Songs (Billboard)	43
