= Bring It On (Kevin Fowler album) =

Studio album by Kevin Fowler
- Released: September 25, 2007
- Genre: Country
- Label: Equity Music Group
- Producer: Blake Chancey

Kevin Fowler chronology
Loose, Loud, & Crazy (2004)	Bring It On (2007)	Best Of… So Far (2010)

Professional ratings
Review scores
Source	Rating
Allmusic	link

Bring It On is the fourth studio album by American country music singer Kevin Fowler. It was released on September 25, 2007, on Equity Music Group. It is also his second and final album for Equity, due to the closure of the label in December 2008. Three singles were released from this album: "Long Line of Losers", "Best Mistake I Ever Made", and "Cheaper to Keep Her". While "Best Mistake I Ever Made" peaked at #47 on the Hot Country Songs chart, the other two singles failed to chart at all. "Long Line of Losers" and "Now You're Talkin'" were both recorded by Montgomery Gentry on their 2008 album, Back When I Knew It All. The latter was co-written by former Trick Pony bassist Ira Dean.

== Track listing ==
1. "Long Line of Losers" (Kevin Fowler, Kim Tribble) - 3:43
2. "Feels Good Don't It" (Fowler, Brandon Kinney, Tracy Martin) - 4:04
3. "Ain't Dead Yet" (David Lee Murphy, Tribble) - 3:36
4. "Me and the Boys" (Fowler, Thom Shepherd) - 4:01
  - featuring George Jones
5. "I Pulled a Hank Last Night" (Marty Brown, Andy Griggs) - 3:54
6. "What's Your Point?" (Fowler, Mark McKinney) - 5:09
7. "Bring It On" (Fowler) - 4:12
8. "Cheaper to Keep Her" (Bart Butler, Fowler, Shepherd) - 3:13
9. "Slow Down" (Fowler, Chris Hennessee) - 3:41
10. "Now You're Talkin'" (Ira Dean, Murphy, Tribble) - 4:00
11. "Best Mistake I Ever Made" (Fowler, Bobby Pounds) - 3:05
12. "Let's Start Livin'" (Kent Agee, Fowler) - 3:09
13. "Honky Tonk Junkie" (Fowler, Clint Ingersoll) - 3:18

== Personnel ==
- Joe Chemay - bass guitar
- Mickey Jack Cones - background vocals
- J.T. Corenflos - electric guitar
- Kevin Fowler - acoustic guitar, lead vocals
- David Grissom - electric guitar
- Owen Hale - drums, percussion
- Tony Harrell - Hammond B-3 organ
- Wes Hightower - background vocals
- Steve Hinson - pedal steel guitar, slide guitar
- George Jones - duet vocals on "Me and the Boys"
- Brent Mason - electric guitar
- Randy McCormick - clavinova, Hammond B-3 organ, piano, Wurlitzer
- Billy Panda - acoustic guitar, mandolin
- Hank Singer - fiddle
- Joe Spivey - fiddle

== Chart performance ==
Chart (2007)	Peak position
U.S. Billboard Top Country Albums	14
U.S. Billboard 200	111
U.S. Billboard Top Heatseekers	2
U.S. Billboard Independent Albums	14
