= Long Line of Losers =

Single by Montgomery Gentry

from the album Back When I Knew It All
- Released: June 22, 2009
- Genre: Country
- Length: 3:48
- Label: Columbia Nashville
- Songwriters: Kevin Fowler; Kim Tribble
- Producer: Blake Chancey

Montgomery Gentry singles chronology
"One in Every Crowd" (2009)	"Long Line of Losers" (2009)	"Oughta Be More Songs About That" (2009)

"Long Line of Losers" is a song recorded by American country music duo Montgomery Gentry. It is the fourth single released from their sixth studio album, Back When I Knew It All. Kevin Fowler who co-wrote the song with Kim Tribble, also recorded this song on his 2007 album Bring It On, also released his version as a single, but it failed to chart. Montgomery Gentry's version debuted at #48 in June 2009, was a Top 30 hit for the duo with a peak of #23 in October 2009.

== Critical reception ==
Dan Milliken of Country Universe gave the song a B+ rating, and said this in his review of the song that it was "their most country-sounding single in some time." Milliken also said that it showed influences from Alabama and Hank Williams, Jr., and that its songwriting "breathe[d] new life" into a common theme of showing pride in a broken family. Bobby Peacock of Roughstock also gave a positive review, calling it "a good example of Montgomery Gentry's musical evolution" and saying that it continued in the "sense of maturity" present in such singles as "Back When I Knew It All" and "Roll with Me."

== Chart ==
"Long Line of Losers" peaked at No. 23 on the chart in mid-October 2009, becoming their first single to miss the top 20 since "You Do Your Thing" reached No. 22 in 2004.

Chart (2009)	Peak position
US Hot Country Songs (Billboard)	23
Canada Country (Billboard)	34
