= Cold One Comin' On =

Single by Montgomery Gentry

from the album Carrying On
- Released: August 25, 2001
- Genre: Country
- Length: 5:10
- Label: Columbia Nashville
- Songwriter(s): Mike Geiger, Woody Mullis, Michael Huffman
- Producer(s): Joe Scaife

Montgomery Gentry singles chronology
"She Couldn't Change Me" (2001)	"Cold One Comin' On" (2001)	"Didn't I" (2002)

"Cold One Comin' On" is a song recorded by American country music duo Montgomery Gentry. It was released in August 2001 as the second single from the album Carrying On. The song reached #23 on the Billboard Hot Country Singles & Tracks chart. The song was written by Mike Geiger, Woody Mullis and Michael Huffman.

== Chart performance ==
Chart (2001)	Peak position
US Hot Country Songs (Billboard)	23
