= Rebels on the Run =

Studio album by Montgomery Gentry
- Released: October 18, 2011
- Genre: Country
- Length: 36:41
- Label: Average Joes
- Producer: Michael Knox

Montgomery Gentry chronology
Back When I Knew It All (2008)	Rebels on the Run (2011)	Folks Like Us (2015)

Singles from Rebels on the Run
- 1. "Where I Come From" Released: July 25, 2011; 2. "So Called Life" Released: April 30, 2012

Professional ratings
Review scores
Source	Rating
AllMusic	3.5/5 stars

Rebels on the Run is the seventh studio album by American country music duo Montgomery Gentry. It was released on October 18, 2011 via Average Joes Entertainment. Inside one copy of the album was a golden ticket for a custom-made Demented Cycles motorcycle.

"So Called Life" was previously recorded and released by its songwriter, Sean Patrick McGraw, and was also recorded by Jaydee Bixby on his 2008 album Cowboys and Cadillacs.

== Track listing ==
No.	Title	Writer(s)	Length
1.	"Damn Right I Am"	Michael Dulaney, Neil Thrasher, Jimmy Yeary	3:29
2.	"Ain't No Law Against That"	Ira Dean, Eddie Montgomery, David Lee Murphy	3:08
3.	"Damn Baby"	Philip Douglas, Adam Fisher, Bernie Nelson	2:49
4.	"Empty"	Kevin Grantt, Joel Shewmake	3:25
5.	"Where I Come From"	Rodney Clawson, Dallas Davidson	3:21
6.	"I Like Those People" (featuring Charlie Daniels and Randy Owen)	Paul Overstreet, Shane Stevens, Matthew West	3:40
7.	"Rebels on the Run"	Tim James, Phil O'Donnell	4:06
8.	"Simple Things"	Troy Gentry, Wendell Mobley, Thrasher	2:56
9.	"Missing You"	Kelly Archer, Greg Bates, Justin Weaver	3:22
10.	"So Called Life"	Sean Patrick McGraw, Bruce Wallace	2:56
11.	"Work Hard, Play Harder"	Jim Collins, Gentry, Rivers Rutherford	3:09

== Personnel ==
- Perry Coleman - background vocals
- Charlie Daniels - vocals on "I Like Those People"
- Troy Gentry - lead vocals, background vocals
- Shalacy Griffin - background vocals
- Angela Hacker - background vocals
- Tony Harrell - Hammond B-3 organ, piano, Wurlitzer
- Mike Johnson - pedal steel guitar, lap steel guitar
- Rob McNelley - electric guitar
- Eddie Montgomery - lead vocals, background vocals
- Greg Morrow - drums, percussion
- Jason Mowery - fiddle
- Randy Owen - vocals on "I Like Those People"
- Rich Redmond - percussion
- Adam Shoenfeld - electric guitar, slide guitar
- Jimmie Lee Sloas - bass guitar
- Ilya Toshinsky - banjo, bouzouki, 12-string guitar, acoustic guitar, hi-string guitar

== Chart performance ==
The album has sold 85,000 copies in the United States as of May 2015.

=== Album ===
Chart (2011)	Peak position
U.S. Billboard Top Country Albums	9
U.S. Billboard 200	28
U.S. Billboard Top Independent Albums	6

=== Singles ===
Year	Single	Peak chart positions	
Year	Single	US Country	US
2011	"Where I Come From"	8	71
2012	"So Called Life"	45	—
"—" denotes releases that did not chart
