= You Do Your Thing (song) =

Single by Montgomery Gentry

from the album You Do Your Thing
- Released: July 24, 2004
- Genre: Country
- Length: 3:43
- Label: Columbia Nashville
- Songwriters: Ed Hill, Casey Beathard
- Producer: Joe Scaife

Montgomery Gentry singles chronology
| "If You Ever Stop Loving Me" (2004) | "You Do Your Thing" (2004) | "Gone" (2004) |

"You Do Your Thing" is a song recorded by American country music duo Montgomery Gentry. It was released in July 2004 as the second single and title track from the album of the same name. The song reached #22 on the Billboard Hot Country Singles & Tracks chart. The song was written by Ed Hill and Casey Beathard.

== Content ==
"You Do Your Thing" is slow-tempo ballad that expresses a live-and-let-live sentiment with lead vocal Eddie Montgomery in it. The narrator makes it a statement directed at people whom he suspects are safe-environmentally-efficient in cars, people whom are non-religious, people whom are not willing to defend Uncle Sam, people whom are making correct parental choices, rule-abiding, looking for a handout, and people whom are judgemental.

The narrator is not letting society telling him what he should do, but instead, do what they desire. And focus on their own needs. And requests not to judge him. Because his Judge (referring to God) will judge all someday.

This song also promotes independence and freedom, encouraging listeners to pursue their own passions and goals without unwanted influence or pressure from others.

== Music video ==
The music video was directed by Michael Salomon, and premiered on CMT on July 28, 2004.

== Chart performance ==
| Chart (2004) | Peak position |
|---|---|
| US Hot Country Songs (Billboard) | 22 |
