= Where I Come From (Montgomery Gentry song) =

Single by Montgomery Gentry

from the album Rebels on the Run
- Released: July 6, 2011
- Genre: Country rock
- Length: 3:21
- Label: Average Joes Entertainment
- Songwriters: Rodney Clawson; Dallas Davidson
- Producer: Michael Knox

Montgomery Gentry singles chronology
"While You're Still Young" (2010)	"Where I Come From" (2011)	"So Called Life" (2012)

"Where I Come From" is a song written by Rodney Clawson and Dallas Davidson and recorded by American country music duo Montgomery Gentry. It was released in July 2011 as the first single from the duo's 2011 album Rebels on the Run.

== Content ==
The song is a mid-tempo rock-influenced song in which the narrators express pride with their Southern heritage. Co-writer Dallas Davidson said that he did not like many of Montgomery Gentry's previous singles, and that "I feel like this song fits them, and I say that as a fan. I think that they can actually stand onstage and sing this song every night, and people are going to believe them because it’s where they come from, too."

The song is set in the key of B-flat minor with a main chord pattern of B♭m-G♭-D♭-A♭.

== Critical reception ==
Billy Dukes of Taste of Country gave the song three stars out of five, saying that it "is better than anything Montgomery Gentry have released in two years, but they're getting by on memories." Bobby Peacock of Roughstock gave the song four stars out of five, calling the production "a little more muscular and gritty than usual" and the lyrics "proud without being boastful." Ben Foster of Country Universe gave the song a C, writing that "by relying so heavily on overused formulas, it’s like they're running around in circles in terms of creativity."

== Commercial performance ==
"Where I Come From" debuted at number 59 on the U.S. Billboard Hot Country Songs chart for the week of July 30, 2011. In March 2012, it became Montgomery Gentry's first Top 10 hit since 2009's "One in Every Crowd," and ultimately peaked at No. 8. It is the duo's last Top 10 single. The single was certified Gold by the RIAA on January 8, 2016. It has sold 484,000 copies in the United States as of September 2017. On April 12, 2022, the single was certified platinum for selling over 1 million units.

== Music video ==
The music video was directed by Potsy Ponciroli, and premiered on CMT on September 14, 2011.

== Charts ==
Chart (2011–2012)	Peak position
US Billboard Hot 100	71
US Hot Country Songs (Billboard)	8
Canada Country (Billboard)	37

=== Year-end charts ===
Chart (2012)	Position
US Country Songs (Billboard)	46

== Certifications ==
Region	Certification	Certified units/sales
United States (RIAA)	Platinum	484,000
