= Carrying On =

Studio album by Montgomery Gentry
- Released: May 1, 2001
- Recorded: 2000–2001
- Genre: Country
- Length: 50:32
- Label: Columbia Nashville
- Producer: Joe Scaife

Montgomery Gentry chronology
Tattoos & Scars (1999)	Carrying On (2001)	My Town (2002)

Singles from Carrying On
- 1. "She Couldn't Change Me" Released: February 5, 2001; 2. "Cold One Comin' On" Released: August 25, 2001

Professional ratings
Review scores
Source	Rating
AllMusic	3/5 stars

Carrying On is the second studio album by American country music duo Montgomery Gentry. It was released in May 2001 via Columbia Nashville. Certified gold in the United States, the album produced only two singles: "She Couldn't Change Me" and "Cold One Comin' On," which reached numbers 2 and 23 on the Hot Country Singles chart, respectively.

== Track listing ==
No.	Title	Writer(s)	Length
1.	"She Couldn't Change Me"	Gary Nicholson, Chris Knight	4:20
2.	"My Father's Son"	Scooter Carusoe, Dan Colehour	4:45
3.	"The Fine Line"	Anthony L. Smith, Rick Tiger	3:51
4.	"Cold One Comin' On"	Michael Huffman, Mike Geiger, Woody Mullis	5:10
5.	"While the World Goes Down the Drain"	Jim Rushing, Keith Sewell	4:05
6.	"Hellbent on Saving Me"	Wendell Mobley, Gordon Bradberry	3:19
7.	"Carrying On"	Anthony Smith, Bobby Terry, Kevin Brandt	3:43
8.	"I'm a Ramblin' Man"	Ray Pennington	3:13
9.	"Black Jack Fletcher and Mississippi Sam"	Ronny Scaife, Phil Thomas, Don Scaife	3:52
10.	"Lucky to Be Here"	Kenny Beard, Eddie Montgomery, Troy Gentry	3:23
11.	"Too Hard to Handle... Too Free to Hold"	George Molton	5:08
12.	"Tried and True"	Matt Hendrix, Clay Davidson	5:43

== Charts ==
=== Weekly charts ===
Chart (2001)	Peak position
US Billboard 200	49
US Top Country Albums (Billboard)	6

=== Year-end charts ===
Chart (2001)	Position
Canadian Country Albums (Nielsen SoundScan)	59
US Top Country Albums (Billboard)	35
Chart (2002)	Position
US Top Country Albums (Billboard)	57

=== Singles ===
Year	Single	Peak positions	
Year	Single	US Country	US
2001	"She Couldn't Change Me"	2	37
2001	"Cold One Comin' On"	23	—

== Certifications ==
Country	Certifier	Certification
United States	RIAA	Gold

== Personnel ==
According to Carrying On liner notes.

Montgomery Gentry

- Troy Gentry - vocals
- Eddie Montgomery - vocals

Musicians

- Larry Beaird – banjo
- Eric Darken – percussion
- Dan Dugmore – steel guitar, electric Dobro
- Glen Duncan – fiddle, mandolin
- Paul Leim – drums, percussion
- Chris Leuzinger – electric guitar
- Gary Lunn – bass guitar
- Anthony Martin – background vocals
- Steve Nathan – piano, synthesizer, Hammond B-3 organ
- Brent Rowan – electric guitar
- Joe Scaife – background vocals
- Randy Sorrells – steel guitar
- Biff Watson – acoustic guitar

Technical

- David Bryant – assistant engineering
- Jim Burnett – editing
- Marina Chavez – photography
- Greg Fogie – assistant engineering
- Randy LeRoy – editing
- Steve Marcantonio – engineering, mixing
- Anthony Martin – associate production
- Glen Rose – photography
- Joe Scaife – production
- Ronnie Thomas – editing
- Rollow Welch – art direction
- Hank Williams – mastering
