= Back When I Knew It All =

Studio album by Montgomery Gentry
- Released: June 10, 2008
- Genre: Country
- Length: 39:13
- Label: Columbia Nashville
- Producer: Blake Chancey

Montgomery Gentry chronology
Some People Change (2006)	Back When I Knew It All (2008)	For Our Heroes (2009)

Singles from Back When I Knew It All
- 1. "Back When I Knew It All" Released: February 25, 2008; 2. "Roll with Me" Released: August 4, 2008; 3. "One in Every Crowd" Released: February 2, 2009; 4. "Long Line of Losers" Released: June 22, 2009

Professional ratings
Review scores
Source	Rating
AllMusic	link

Back When I Knew It All is the sixth studio album by the American country music duo Montgomery Gentry. It was released by Columbia Records Nashville on June 10, 2008 (see 2008 in country music). The album's lead-off single, also its title track, became their fourth Number One on the Billboard Hot Country Songs charts in July 2008, as did "Roll with Me", the second single, in December 2008. The third single "One in Every Crowd" was released in February 2009, followed by the fourth single "Long Line of Losers" on June 22, 2009.

== Content ==
Back When I Knew It All was produced by Blake Chancey. The album's first release to country radio was its title track, co-written by Trent Willmon. In mid-2008, this song became Montgomery Gentry's fourth Number One hit on the Billboard Hot Country Songs charts. Following it was "Roll with Me", which also topped Hot Country Songs. "One in Every Crowd" is the album's third single, released in early 2009. This song and "Now You're Talkin'" were co-written by Ira Dean, formerly bass guitarist in the group, Trick Pony. "Now You're Talkin'" and "Long Line of Losers" (the fourth single) were previously recorded by Kevin Fowler on his 2007 album Bring It On, and "The Big Revival" was previously recorded by John Anderson on his 2000 album Nobody's Got It All, which Chancey also produced.

== Track listing ==
1. "The Big Revival" (Dennis Linde) – 4:02
2. "Long Line of Losers" (Kevin Fowler, Kim Tribble) – 3:48
3. "Now You're Talkin'" (Ira Dean, David Lee Murphy, Tribble) – 3:24
4. "Back When I Knew It All" (Gary Hannan, Phil O'Donnell, Trent Willmon) – 3:59
5. "Roll with Me" (Clint Daniels, Tommy Karlas) – 3:53
  - background vocals: Five for Fighting
6. "One in Every Crowd" (Dean, Tribble, Eddie Montgomery) – 3:31
7. "Look Some More" (Tony Martin, Wendell Mobley, Neil Thrasher) – 2:58
8. "I Pick My Parties" (Terri Clark, Murphy, Tom Shapiro) – 3:22
  - featuring Toby Keith
9. "One Trip" (Brett James, Angelo Petraglia) – 4:01
10. "It Ain't About Easy" (Mike Lane, Tony Lane, David Lee) – 3:00
11. "God Knows Who I Am" (Hannan, O'Donnell, Montgomery) – 3:15
  - featuring Lillie Mae Rische of Jypsi

== Personnel ==
- Pat Buchanan - 12-string guitar, acoustic guitar, electric guitar, harmonica, slide guitar
- Rachel Calloway - intro vocals on "The Big Revival"
- Dan Dugmore - banjo, dobro, acoustic guitar, electric guitar, lap steel guitar, mandolin, pedal steel guitar, slide guitar
- Five for Fighting - background vocals on "Roll with Me"
- Troy Gentry - lead vocals, background vocals
- David Grissom - baritone guitar, electric guitar
- Wes Hightower - background vocals
- Mark Hill - bass guitar
- Toby Keith - vocals on "I Pick My Parties"
- Chuck Leavell - Hammond organ, piano, Wurlitzer
- Eddie Montgomery - lead vocals, background vocals
- Greg Morrow - drums, percussion
- Gordon Mote - intro vocals & intro organ on "The Big Revival"
- MTSU Omega Delta Psi Recording Industry Fraternity - marching on "The Big Revival", clapping & gang vocals on "One In Every Crowd"
- Billy Panda - acoustic guitar, electric guitar, mandolin
- Lillie Mae Rische - vocals on "God Knows Who I Am"

Church Congregation on "The Big Revival": Kent Agee, Diane Akin, Jayme Calhoun-Paulk, Katie Cleek, Ryan Cook, Mel Eubanks, Missy Evans, Chris Gillis, Chris Hennessee, Teresa Pitt, Daniel Rediger, Josh Van Valkenburg, Hannah Williams, Willetta Williams

== Chart performance ==
=== Weekly charts ===
Chart (2008)	Peak position
US Billboard 200	20
US Top Country Albums (Billboard)	3

=== Year-end charts ===
Chart (2008)	Position
US Top Country Albums (Billboard)	59
Chart (2009)	Position
US Top Country Albums (Billboard)	59

Singles

Year	Single	Chart Positions		
Year	Single	US Country	US	CAN
2008	"Back When I Knew It All"	1	56	89
2008	"Roll With Me"	1	33	66
2009	"One in Every Crowd"	5	53	71
2009	"Long Line of Losers"	23	—	—
