= Folks Like Us =

Studio album by Montgomery Gentry
- Released: June 9, 2015
- Genre: Country
- Label: Blaster
- Producer: Michael Knox

Montgomery Gentry chronology
Rebels on the Run (2011)	Folks Like Us (2015)	Here's to You (2018)

Singles from Folks Like Us
- 1. "Headlights" Released: August 18, 2014; 2. "Folks Like Us" Released: March 2015

Folks Like Us is the eighth studio album by American country music duo Montgomery Gentry. It was released on June 9, 2015 via Blaster Records as their only studio album for the label. "Headlights" and the title track were released as singles. It was also the last album released by the duo before Troy Gentry's death in 2017 in a helicopter crash.

== Content ==
Troy Gentry described the title track as " a song about American society and making ends meet. It's about being patriotic and showing your faith and the love of family. It's one of those blue-collar songs that we've been known for doing for so long."

== Critical reception ==
Stephen Thomas Erlewine of Allmusic rated it 3 out of 5 stars, stating that " Montgomery Gentry are comfortable where they are, alternating rocking country with strong sentiment."

== Track listing ==
No.	Title	Writer(s)	Length
1.	"We Were Here"	Marv Green, Wendell Mobley, Tim Nichols	3:44
2.	"Headlights"	Bob DiPiero, Mobley	3:05
3.	"In a Small Town"	busbee, Brett James, Justin Weaver	3:46
4.	"Back on a Dirt Road"	Jack Williams	3:51
5.	"Two Old Friends"	Mobley, Jessica McCall	3:22
6.	"Folks Like Us"	Ash Bowers, Neal Coty, Adam Craig	3:08
7.	"Pain"	Al Anderson	3:08
8.	"Hillbilly Hippies"	Brett Beavers, Mobley	3:05
9.	"Better for It"	Craig Wiseman	3:38
10.	"That's Just Living"	Ross Copperman, David Lee Murphy	3:47

== Personnel ==
Credits by AllMusic

=== Montgomery Gentry ===
- Troy Gentry - vocals
- Eddie Montgomery - vocals

=== Additional Musicians ===
- Kurt Allison - electric guitar
- Perry Coleman - background vocals
- Shalacy Griffin - background vocals
- Tania Hancheroff - background vocals
- Tony Harrell - Hammond B-3 organ, keyboards, Wurlitzer
- Tully Kennedy - bass guitar
- Danny Rader - banjo, acoustic guitar
- Rich Redmond - drum programming, drums, percussion
- Adam Shoenfeld - electric guitar

== Chart performance ==
Album

Chart (2015)	Peak position
US Billboard 200	121
US Top Country Albums (Billboard)	13
US Independent Albums (Billboard)	6

Singles

Year	Single	Peak chart positions
Year	Single	US Country Airplay
2014	"Headlights"	40
2015	"Folks Like Us"	49
