= Loose, Loud & Crazy =

Loose, Loud, & Crazy

Studio album by Kevin Fowler
- Released: August 3, 2004
- Genre: Country
- Label: Equity Music Group
- Producer: Billy Joe Walker, Jr.

Kevin Fowler chronology
Live at Billy Bob's Texas (2002)	Loose, Loud, & Crazy (2004)	Bring It On (2007)

Loose, Loud, & Crazy is the third studio album by the American country music singer Kevin Fowler, and his fourth album overall. It was his first album for Equity Music Group, a label started by the country music singer Clint Black. The album produced three singles: "Ain't Drinkin' Anymore", "Hard Man to Love" and "Don't Touch My Willie". The first single peaked at #49 on the Hot Country Singles & Tracks (now Hot Country Songs) chart, while the latter two failed to chart. Fowler wrote or co-wrote all but one of the songs on the album.

"The Lord Loves the Drinkin' Man" was later recorded by Mark Chesnutt on his 2004 album, Savin' the Honky Tonk, from which it was a Top 40 single on the country charts that same year.

== Track listing ==
1. "Loose, Loud, & Crazy" (Bart Butler, Kevin Fowler, Jamie Richards) - 3:25
2. "Get Along" (Fowler, Mike Geiger) - 2:44
3. "Hard Man to Love" (Fowler, Bobby Pinson) - 4:02
4. "Ain't Drinkin' Anymore" (Fowler) - 2:55
5. "Political Incorrectness" (Roger Brown, Fowler) - 3:38
  - duet with Mark Chesnutt
6. "A Matter of When" (Fowler, Thom Shepherd) - 3:54
7. "Long Neckin' (Makes for Short Memories)" (Casey Beathard, Marla Cannon-Goodman, Michael P. Heeney) - 3:25
8. "Triple Crown" (Fowler, Bobby Pounds, Greg Whitfield) - 2:44
9. "Half" (Billy Applegate, Fowler) - 3:39
10. "I'll Try Anything Twice" (Fowler) - 4:03
11. "The Lord Loves the Drinkin' Man" (Fowler) - 4:06
12. "Don't Touch My Willie" (Fowler, Pounds, Holly Watson) - 4:25
  - live recording

== Personnel ==
- Ponty Bone - accordion
- John Carroll - electric guitar
- Mark Chesnutt - duet vocals on "Political Incorrectness"
- Tommy Detamore - steel guitar
- Dan Dreeben - drums
- Bobby Flores - fiddle
- Kevin Fowler - lead vocals
- Wes Hightower - background vocals
- Jason Roberts - fiddle
- John Wesley Ryles - background vocals
- John Michael Whitby - piano
- Greg Whitfield - acoustic guitar

== Chart performance ==
Chart (2004)	Peak position
U.S. Billboard Top Country Albums	31
U.S. Billboard 200	195
U.S. Billboard Top Heatseekers	11
U.S. Billboard Independent Albums	13
