= She Don't Tell Me To =

Single by Montgomery Gentry

from the album Something to Be Proud Of: The Best of 1999-2005
- Released: October 25, 2005
- Recorded: 2005
- Genre: Country rock
- Length: 3:08
- Label: Columbia Nashville
- Songwriters: Bob DiPiero; Tom Shapiro; Rivers Rutherford
- Producers: Rivers Rutherford; Mark Wright

Montgomery Gentry singles chronology
"Something to Be Proud Of" (2005)	"She Don't Tell Me To" (2005)	"Some People Change" (2006)

"She Don't Tell Me To" is a song written by Tom Shapiro, Bob DiPiero and Rivers Rutherford, and recorded by American country music duo Montgomery Gentry. It was released in October 2005 as the only single from their compilation album titled Something to Be Proud Of: The Best of 1999-2005.

== Content ==
In this slow-tempoed tune, the narrator describes things he does for his lover (e.g., bringing home wildflowers, going to church with her after leaving early from Saturday nights out with his buddies, and apologizing when he is wrong in an argument) out of his own choice, rather than because she tells him to do so.

== Music video ==
The music video was directed by Deb Haus and Jerad Sloan. It premiered on CMT on October 29, 2005, and peaked at #5 on CMT's Top 20 Countdown in March 2006. It was shot over 2 days, in Iceland.

== Chart positions ==
Chart (2005–2006)	Peak position
Canada Country (Radio & Records)	12
US Hot Country Songs (Billboard)	5
US Billboard Hot 100	62

=== Year-end charts ===
Chart (2006)	Position
US Country Songs (Billboard)	24
