= You Do Your Thing =

Studio album by Montgomery Gentry
- Released: May 18, 2004
- Genre: Country
- Length: 47:49
- Label: Columbia Nashville
- Producer: Blake Chancey, Rivers Rutherford, Joe Scaife, Jeffrey Steele

Montgomery Gentry chronology
My Town (2002)	You Do Your Thing (2004)	Something to Be Proud Of: The Best of 1999–2005 (2005)

Singles from You Do Your Thing
- 1. "If You Ever Stop Loving Me" Released: February 2, 2004; 2. "You Do Your Thing" Released: July 24, 2004; 3. "Gone" Released: November 15, 2004; 4. "Something to Be Proud Of" Released: May 9, 2005

Professional ratings
Review scores
Source	Rating
AllMusic	4/5 stars

You Do Your Thing is the fourth studio album by American country music duo Montgomery Gentry. It was released in 2004 (see 2004 in country music) and has been certified platinum by the RIAA. The album produced the duo's first Number One hit on the Billboard country music charts in "If You Ever Stop Loving Me"; other singles included the title track, "Gone", and "Something to Be Proud Of" (also a Number One).

"If It's the Last Thing I Do" was also recorded by Brooks & Dunn on their 2001 album, Steers & Stripes, and in 2004 by James Otto on his album Days of Our Lives. Both of these renditions were titled "The Last Thing I Do".

== Track listing ==
No.	Title	Writer(s)	Length
1.	"Something to Be Proud Of"	Jeffrey Steele, Chris Wallin	4:16
2.	"You Do Your Thing"	Casey Beathard, Ed Hill	3:43
3.	"If You Ever Stop Loving Me"	Bob DiPiero, Rivers Rutherford, Tom Shapiro	3:24
4.	"If It's the Last Thing I Do"	David Lee Murphy, Kim Tribble	4:02
5.	"She Loved Me"	Steele, Craig Wiseman	3:58
6.	"Gone"	DiPiero, Steele	4:11
7.	"All I Know About Mexico"	Steele, Wallin	4:10
8.	"I Got Drunk"	David Grissom, Chris Stapleton	4:14
9.	"It's All Good"	Bryan Campbell, Matt Hendrix, Diana Hendrix	3:58
10.	"I Ain't Got It All That Bad" (feat. Hank Williams Jr.)	Rutherford, George Teren, Jamie Lee Thurston	3:23
11.	"Talking to My Angel"	Michael Dulaney, Troy Gentry, Jason Sellers	3:22
12.	"I Never Thought I'd Live This Long"	Kelley Lovelace, Rutherford	5:28

== Production ==
As listed in liner notes.

- Blake Chancey – tracks 7, 10
- Rivers Rutherford – tracks 3, 12
- Joe Scaife – tracks 2, 4, 8, 9, 11
- Jeffrey Steele – tracks 1, 5, 6

== Personnel ==
As listed in liner notes.

- Bekka Bramlett – background vocals
- Pat Buchanan – electric guitar
- Tom Bukovac – electric guitar
- Perry Coleman – background vocals
- Eric Darken – percussion
- Dan Dugmore – pedal steel guitar, lap steel guitar, acoustic guitar
- Chris Dunn – horns
- Shannon Forrest – drums
- Troy Gentry- lead vocals, background vocals
- Kenny Greenberg – electric guitar
- David Grissom – acoustic guitar, electric guitar
- Tom Hambridge – background vocals
- Tony Harrell – keyboards
- Wes Hightower – background vocals
- Mark Hill – bass guitar
- Jim Horn – horns
- Sam Levine – horns
- Eddie Montgomery- lead vocals, background vocals
- Greg Morrow – drums, percussion
- Russ Pahl – pedal steel guitar, banjo
- Billy Panda – acoustic guitar, pedal steel guitar, 12-string guitar, banjo
- Steve Patrick – horns
- Angela Primm – background vocals
- Michael Rhodes – bass guitar
- Rivers Rutherford – acoustic guitar, background vocals
- Joe Scaife – background vocals
- Jason Sellers – background vocals
- Steve Sheehan – acoustic guitar
- Jeffrey Steele – background vocals
- Bryan Sutton – 12-string banjo, bouzouki
- Gale West – background vocals
- John Willis – acoustic guitar, bouzouki
- Gretchen Wilson – background vocals
- Reese Wynans – Hammond B-3 organ, piano

== Chart performance ==
=== Weekly charts ===
Chart (2004)	Peak position
US Billboard 200	10
US Top Country Albums (Billboard)	2

=== Year-end charts ===
Chart (2004)	Position
US Top Country Albums (Billboard)	36
Chart (2005)	Position
US Billboard 200	169
US Top Country Albums (Billboard)	27

=== Singles ===
Year	Single	Chart Positions	
Year	Single	US Country	US
2004	"If You Ever Stop Loving Me"	1	30
2004	"You Do Your Thing"	22	—
2004	"Gone"	3	53
2005	"Something to Be Proud Of"	1	41

== Certifications ==
Country	Certifier	Certification
United States	RIAA	Platinum
