= Some People Change =

Studio album by Montgomery Gentry
- Released: October 24, 2006
- Genre: Country
- Length: 45:10
- Label: Columbia Nashville
- Producers: Troy Gentry; Eddie Montgomery; Rivers Rutherford; Jeffrey Steele; Mark Wright

Montgomery Gentry chronology
Something to Be Proud Of: The Best of 1999–2005 (2005)	Some People Change (2006)	Back When I Knew It All (2008)

Singles from Some People Change
- 1. "Some People Change" Released: August 29, 2006; 2. "Lucky Man" Released: January 29, 2007; 3. "What Do Ya Think About That" Released: July 30, 2007

Professional ratings
Review scores
Source	Rating
AllMusic	link
Entertainment Weekly	C link

Some People Change is the fifth studio album by American country music duo Montgomery Gentry. It was released by Columbia Records Nashville on October 24, 2006. Certified gold in the United States, the album produced three singles on the Billboard Hot Country Songs charts: the title track (previously cut by Kenny Chesney on his 2004 album When the Sun Goes Down), "Lucky Man", and "What Do Ya Think About That". The title track was a number seven hit on the Hot Country Songs charts, while "Lucky Man" became the duo's third Number One hit, and "What Do Ya Think About That" reached number three.

Sony BMG Nashville chairman Joe Galante thought that the duo and the label "strayed musically from what the base had been. They have an edge to their sound, and I think we got a little too soft."

== Track listing ==
No.	Title	Writer(s)	Length
1.	"Some People Change"	Neil Thrasher, Jason Sellers, Michael Dulaney	3:23
2.	"Hey Country"	Jeffrey Steele, Danny Myrick, Bart Allmand	3:23
3.	"Lucky Man"	David Cory Lee, Dave Turnbull	3:17
4.	"Takes All Kinds"	Thrasher, Dulaney, Troy Gentry	2:53
5.	"Your Tears Are Comin'"	Steele, Tom Hambridge	4:04
6.	"Clouds"	Steele, Eddie Montgomery, Tony Mullins	3:45
7.	"Twenty Years Ago"	Steele, Gary Nicholson, Rivers Rutherford	4:21
8.	"What Do Ya Think About That"	Anthony Smith, Brett Jones	3:40
9.	"Redder Than That"	George Teren, Rutherford	4:18
10.	"A Man's Job"	Montgomery, Gary Hannan, Thom Shepherd, Phil O'Donnell	4:11
11.	"If You Wanna Keep an Angel"	Tom Shapiro, Rutherford, Gentry	4:28
12.	"Free Ride in the Fast Lane"	Rutherford, Teren, Robert Houston	3:21

Best Buy Bonus Tracks
No.	Title	Writer(s)	Length
13.	"Blue Collar Nights"	Steele, Allmand	3:59
14.	"The Man That I Am"	Steele, Mullins, Vicky McGehee	3:54
Total length:			7:53

== Personnel ==
- Scott Baggett – bagpipes
- Robert Bailey – background vocals
- Angela Bennett Shelton – background vocals
- Bekka Bramlett – background vocals
- Pat Buchanan – acoustic guitar, harmonica
- Tom Bukovac – acoustic guitar, electric guitar
- David Campbell – string arrangements
- Perry Coleman – background vocals
- Janice Corder – background vocals
- Eric Darken – percussion
- Everett Drake – background vocals
- Dan Dugmore – acoustic guitar, steel guitar, lap steel guitar
- Shannon Forrest – drums
- Larry Franklin – fiddle
- Troy Gentry – lead vocals, background vocals
- Carl Gorodetzky – contractor
- Kenny Greenberg – acoustic guitar, electric guitar
- Vicki Hampton – background vocals
- Tony Harrell – Hammond organ, piano
- Emily Harris – background vocals
- Wes Hightower – background vocals
- Edward Jenkins – background vocals
- B. James Lowry – acoustic guitar
- Steve Mackey – bass guitar
- Eddie Montgomery – lead vocals, background vocals
- Greg Morrow – drums, percussion
- Wendy Moten – background vocals
- Danny Myrick – background vocals
- The Nashville String Machine – strings
- Russ Pahl – acoustic guitar, electric guitar, steel guitar, lap steel guitar
- Billy Panda – electric guitar
- Shandra Penix – background vocals
- Michael Rhodes – bass guitar
- Brent Rowan – electric guitar
- Jeffrey Steele – electric guitar, harmonica, background vocals
- Crystal Taliefero – background vocals
- Neil Thrasher – background vocals
- Reese Wynans – Hammond organ, piano

Technical

- Hank Williams – mastering
- Matt Anderson – engineering
- Jeff Balding – engineering
- Steve Blackmon – engineering
- Greg Droman – engineering
- Leslie Richter – engineering
- Joey Turner – engineering
- David Beano Hall – engineering
- Brian Gill – engineering, mixing assistant
- Steve Beers – assistant engineer
- Todd Gunnerson – assistant engineer
- Steve Marcantonio – engineering, mixing
- Chip Matthews – engineering, mixing
- J.C. Monterrosa – assistant engineer, engineer, mixing assistant
- Tracy Baskette-Fleaner – art direction, design
- James E Hackett III – assistant engineer
- Judy Forde Blair – liner notes, production coordination
- Margaret Malandruccolo – photography

Production

- Mark Wright, Eddie Montgomery, and Troy Gentry - tracks 1, 4
- Wright, Rivers Rutherford, and Jeffrey Steele - track 7
- Wright and Rutherford - tracks 3, 9–12
- Wright and Steele - tracks 2, 5, 6, 8, 13, 14

== Chart performance ==
=== Weekly charts ===
Chart (2006)	Peak position
US Billboard 200	23
US Top Country Albums (Billboard)	5

=== Year-end charts ===
Chart (2007)	Position
US Top Country Albums (Billboard)	40
Chart (2008)	Position
US Top Country Albums (Billboard)	66

=== Singles ===
Year	Single	Chart Positions		
Year	Single	US Country	US	CAN
2006	"Some People Change"	7	65	—
2007	"Lucky Man"	1	65	88
2007	"What Do Ya Think About That"	3	57	98

== Certifications ==
Country	Certifier	Certification
United States	RIAA	Gold
