= Hell Yeah (Montgomery Gentry song) =

Single by Montgomery Gentry

from the album My Town
- B-side: "My Town"
- Released: July 28, 2003
- Recorded: 2002
- Genre: Country
- Length: 4:51 (album version); 3:59 (radio edit)
- Label: Columbia Nashville
- Songwriters: Jeffrey Steele, Craig Wiseman
- Producer: Blake Chancey

Montgomery Gentry singles chronology
"Speed" (2002)	"Hell Yeah" (2003)	"If You Ever Stop Loving Me" (2004)

"Hell Yeah" is a song written by Jeffrey Steele and Craig Wiseman and recorded by American country music duo Montgomery Gentry. It was released in July 2003 as the third and final single from the duo's album My Town. The song peaked at number 4 on the US Billboard Hot Country Singles & Tracks chart and reached number 45 on the Billboard Hot 100.

== Content ==
The narrator recounts the lives of two people, a male of "the Haggard generation" and a female of "the Me Generation", who both like to party and want to go back to when "life was good and love was easy."

== Music video ==
The music video was directed by Trey Fanjoy and premiered in late 2003.

== Charts positions ==
"Hell Yeah" debuted at number 59 on the U.S. Billboard Hot Country Songs for the week of July 26, 2003. The song has sold 492,000 copies in the U.S. as of September 2017 and was eventually certified Gold by the RIAA on June 6, 2024.

Chart (2003)	Peak position
US Hot Country Songs (Billboard)	4
US Billboard Hot 100	45

=== Year-end charts ===
Chart (2003)	Position
US Country Songs (Billboard)	57

== Certifications ==
Region	Certification	Certified units/sales
United States (RIAA)	Gold	500,000^{‡}
^{‡} Sales+streaming figures based on certification alone.

== Parodies ==
- American parody artist Cledus T. Judd released a parody of "Hell Yeah" titled "Hell No" on his 2004 album Bipolar and Proud.
