= Lucky Man (Montgomery Gentry song) =

Single by Montgomery Gentry

from the album Some People Change
- Released: January 29, 2007
- Recorded: 2006
- Genre: Country
- Length: 3:17
- Label: Columbia Nashville
- Songwriters: David Cory Lee; Dave Turnbull
- Producers: Rivers Rutherford; Mark Wright

Montgomery Gentry singles chronology
"Some People Change" (2006)	"Lucky Man" (2007)	"What Do Ya Think About That" (2007)

"Lucky Man" is a song written by David Cory Lee and Dave Turnbull and recorded by American country music duo Montgomery Gentry. It was released in January 2007 as the second single from the duo's 2006 album Some People Change. The song became their third number one single on the US Billboard Hot Country Songs chart and stayed there for two weeks. It also peaked at number 65 on the Billboard Hot 100.

The song received a 2008 nomination for Grammy Award for Best Country Performance by a Duo or Group with Vocal, the duo's first nomination.

== Content ==
The song opens with the narrator listing various small things that annoy him, such as his job and the weather; however, he then reminds himself, "I know I'm a lucky man / God's given me a pretty fair hand", and turns to recounting all of the luxuries in his life, from his family to his health to his truck to his new fishing rod.

The second line of the song's first verse, "And last Sunday, when my Bengals lost / Lord, it put me in a bad mood" was edited for different markets; 81 additional team names from the MLB, NHL, NBA, NFL, and NCAA (in place of the Cincinnati Bengals) in these different edits, depending on the market.

== Critical reception ==
Kevin John Coyne of Country Universe gave the song an A− grade, saying that "the vocal sounds worn down at times, but it works well given the song's message". Coyne also described the song as a "timely reminder to be grateful of what you have, even if you still sometimes feel envy for what you don’t have".

== 20 Years of Hits Version ==
In November 2018, Montgomery Gentry released a new rendition of the song, featuring fellow American country artist Darius Rucker. The new rendition is part of a 20th anniversary album, Montgomery Gentry: 20 Years of Hits.

== Chart positions ==
Chart (2007)	Peak position
US Hot Country Songs (Billboard)	1
US Billboard Hot 100	65
Canada Country (Billboard)	10
Canada Hot 100 (Billboard)	88

=== Year-end charts ===
Chart (2007)	Position
US Country Songs (Billboard)	15
