= Speed (Montgomery Gentry song) =

Single by Montgomery Gentry

from the album My Town
- B-side: "She Couldn't Change Me"
- Released: December 30, 2002
- Recorded: 2002
- Genre: Country
- Length: 3:59
- Label: Columbia Nashville
- Songwriters: Jeffrey Steele, Chris Wallin
- Producer: Blake Chancey

Montgomery Gentry singles chronology
"My Town" (2002)	"Speed" (2002)	"Hell Yeah" (2003)

"Speed" is a song written by Jeffrey Steele and Chris Wallin, and recorded by American country music duo Montgomery Gentry. It was released in December 2002 as the second single from their album My Town. The title from the cover of this single borrows its font from Speed Racer.

"She Couldn't Change Me" was included as a B-side.

== Music video ==
The music video was directed by Trey Fanjoy. A young man trades his old truck for a car with speed as his truck just brings back memories of his ex-lover, played by actress, Marisa Petroro. He buys the car, then he drives the car really fast, but as he keeps seeing the memory of his ex-lover on the road, he jumps out of the car, and then he heads out running into the field. The duo is performing the song in the middle of a two-lane road at a night time setting.

A sign at the car dealership displays a phone number with the area code 661, suggesting that the video takes place in or near Bakersfield, California.

== Chart positions ==
"Speed" debuted at #57 on the U.S. Billboard Hot Country Songs for the week of December 28, 2002.

Chart (2002–2003)	Peak position
US Hot Country Songs (Billboard)	5
US Billboard Hot 100	47

=== Year-end charts ===
Chart (2003)	Position
US Country Songs (Billboard)	24
