= Tattoos & Scars =

Studio album by Montgomery Gentry
- Released: April 6, 1999
- Recorded: 1999
- Genre: Country
- Length: 38:55
- Label: Columbia Nashville
- Producer: Joe Scaife

Montgomery Gentry chronology
Tattoos & Scars (1999)	Carrying On (2001)

Singles from Tattoos & Scars
- 1. "Hillbilly Shoes" Released: February 22, 1999; 2. "Lonely and Gone" Released: June 22, 1999; 3. "Daddy Won't Sell the Farm" Released: November 2, 1999; 4. "Self Made Man" Released: April 22, 2000; 5. "All Night Long" Released: August 2000

Professional ratings
Review scores
Source	Rating
AllMusic	4/5 stars
Entertainment Weekly	B link

Tattoos & Scars is the debut studio album by American country music duo Montgomery Gentry. It was released in April 1999 via Columbia Records Nashville. Certified platinum in the United States, the album produced five singles on the Billboard Hot Country Singles & Tracks (now Hot Country Songs) charts: "Hillbilly Shoes", "Lonely and Gone", "Daddy Won't Sell the Farm", "Self Made Man", and "All Night Long" (a duet with Charlie Daniels); "Lonely and Gone" was the highest, peaking at number 5. "Didn't Your Mama Tell Ya" and "Trouble Is" features Troy Gentry singing alone as lead vocals.

== Content ==
Tattoos & Scars produced five singles for the duo upon its 1999 release. Leading off the album's singles was "Hillbilly Shoes", a #13 U.S. country hit. After it came the #5 "Lonely and Gone", co-written by Pirates of the Mississippi member Bill McCorvey, along with Dave Gibson, formerly of the Gibson/Miller Band. "Daddy Won't Sell the Farm", co-written by Canadian singer Steve Fox, was the third single, with a #17 peak. It was followed by "Self Made Man" and finally "All Night Long", both at #31. "Trouble Is" was co-written by Little Texas guitarist Porter Howell.

== Track listing ==
No.	Title	Writer(s)	Length
1.	"Hillbilly Shoes"	Bobby Taylor, Mike Geiger, Woody Mullis	3:13
2.	"Trying to Survive"	Stephony Smith, Kevin Brandt	3:50
3.	"Lonely and Gone"	Bill McCorvey, Dave Gibson, Greg Crowe	3:19
4.	"Self Made Man"	Wynn Varble, Jay Knowles	3:35
5.	"Daddy Won't Sell the Farm"	Robin Branda, Steve Fox	4:18
6.	"If a Broken Heart Could Kill"	Rick Ferrell, Steve Clark	3:19
7.	"I've Loved a Lot More Than I've Hurt"	Max D. Barnes	3:14
8.	"Didn't Your Mama Tell Ya"	Stewart Harris, Clay Davidson	3:26
9.	"Trouble Is"	Porter Howell, Sam Gay	3:09
10.	"Tattoos & Scars"	Tony Lane	3:59
11.	"All Night Long" (featuring Charlie Daniels)	Charlie Daniels, Joel "Taz" DiGregorio, Jack Gavin, Charlie Hayward, Bruce Ray Brown	3:33

== Personnel ==
Adapted from liner notes.

- Jim Cotton – background vocals on "All Night Long"
- Charlie Daniels – vocals on "All Night Long"
- Dan Dugmore – electric dobro, steel guitar
- Glen Duncan – fiddle, mandolin
- Steve Fox – background vocals on "All Night Long"
- Troy Gentry – lead vocals (1, some on tracks 3, 7, 8, 9 10, and 11, background vocals (2, 3, 4, 5, 6, 7, 10 and 11)
- Paul Leim – drums, percussion
- Chris Leuzinger – electric guitar
- Gary Lunn – bass guitar, fretless bass guitar
- Steve Marcantonio – background vocals on "All Night Long"
- Anthony Martin – background vocals
- Eddie Montgomery – lead vocals (some on track 1, All on tracks 2, 3, 4, 5, 6, 7, 10 and 11), background vocals on (1, 7, 8, 9, 10, and 11)
- Steve Nathan – organ, piano, synthesizer
- Brent Rowan – electric guitar
- Joe Scaife – background vocals on "All Night Long"
- Biff Watson – acoustic guitar

== Charts ==
=== Weekly charts ===
Chart (1999)	Peak position
Canadian Country Albums (RPM)	4
US Billboard 200	131
US Top Country Albums (Billboard)	10
US Heatseekers Albums (Billboard)	2

=== Year-end charts ===
Chart (1999)	Position
US Top Country Albums (Billboard)	53
Chart (2000)	Position
US Top Country Albums (Billboard)	34

=== Singles ===
Year	Single	Peak chart positions		
Year	Single	US Country	US	CAN Country
1999	"Hillbilly Shoes"	13	62	7
1999	"Lonely and Gone"	5	46	11
1999	"Daddy Won't Sell the Farm"	17	79	19
2000	"Self Made Man"	31	—	50
2000	"All Night Long" (with Charlie Daniels)	31	—	*

== Certifications ==
Country	Certifier	Certification
United States	RIAA	Platinum
