= My Town (album) =

Studio album by Montgomery Gentry
- Released: August 27, 2002
- Recorded: 2002
- Genre: Country
- Length: 49:53
- Label: Columbia Nashville
- Producer: Blake Chancey

Montgomery Gentry chronology
Carrying On (2001)	My Town (2002)	You Do Your Thing (2004)

Singles from My Town
- 1. "My Town" Released: June 3, 2002; 2. "Speed" Released: December 30, 2002; 3. "Hell Yeah" Released: July 28, 2003

Professional ratings
Review scores
Source	Rating
AllMusic	3.5/5 stars

My Town is the third studio album by American country music duo Montgomery Gentry. It was released in 2002 (see 2002 in country music). Certified platinum in the United States, the album produced three consecutive top-five hits on the Billboard country charts with the title track, "Speed", and "Hell Yeah". It is Montgomery Gentry's best-selling album to date, with over 1.1 million units sold.

== Track listing ==
No.	Title	Writer(s)	Length
1.	"My Town"	Reed Nielsen, Jeffrey Steele	4:25
2.	"Break My Heart Again"	Tim Owens, Kenny Beard, Jeff Bates	4:02
3.	"Scarecrow"	Matt Hendrix, Doug Powell	3:21
4.	"Bad for Good"	Brett Beavers, Troy VonHoefen, Jim Beavers	3:00
5.	"Speed"	Steele, Chris Wallin	3:59
6.	"Hell Yeah"	Craig Wiseman, Steele	4:50
7.	"Lonesome"	Beard, Casey Beathard, Frank Rogers	4:22
8.	"Why Do I Feel Like Running"	Al Anderson, Rivers Rutherford	4:00
9.	"Free Fall"	Chuck Jones, Wes Hightower, Jimmy Ritchey	3:54
10.	"Lie Before You Leave"	Tom Shapiro, Rutherford	4:13
11.	"For the Money"	Rutherford, Annie Tate, Sam Tate	4:01
12.	"Good Clean Fun"	Gregg Allman, Dickey Betts, Johnny Neel	5:23

== Personnel ==
Adapted from liner notes.

- Al Anderson- electric guitar
- Bekka Bramlett- background vocals (track 1)
- Pat Buchanan- electric guitar
- Eric Darken- percussion
- Dan Dugmore- dobro, acoustic guitar, steel guitar
- Troy Gentry- lead vocals, background vocals
- David Grissom- electric guitar
- Wes Hightower- background vocals (track 9)
- Mark Hill- bass guitar
- Chuck Leavell- keyboards
- Eddie Montgomery- lead vocals, background vocals
- Greg Morrow- drums
- Johnny Neel- harmonica, Hammond organ
- Doug Powell- mandolin
- Darrell Scott- banjo
- Jeffrey Steele- background vocals (track 1)
- Curtis Wright- background vocals (tracks 2, 3, 7, 8, 10, 11)

== Chart performance ==
=== Weekly charts ===
Chart (2002)	Peak position
US Billboard 200	26
US Top Country Albums (Billboard)	3

=== Year-end charts ===
Chart (2002)	Position
US Top Country Albums (Billboard)	55
Chart (2003)	Position
US Top Country Albums (Billboard)	22
Chart (2004)	Position
US Top Country Albums (Billboard)	39

=== Singles ===
Year	Single	Peak positions	
Year	Single	US Country	US
2002	"My Town"	5	40
2002	"Speed"	5	47
2003	"Hell Yeah"	4	45

== Certifications ==
Country	Certifier	Certification
United States	RIAA	Platinum
