= Beer, Bait & Ammo =

Studio album by Kevin Fowler
- Released: November 21, 2000
- Genre: Country
- Length: 47:09
- Label: Tin Roof
- Producer: Daren Fleming; Kevin Fowler

Kevin Fowler chronology
Beer, Bait & Ammo (2000)	High on the Hog (2002)

Professional ratings
Review scores
Source	Rating
Allmusic	3/5 stars

Beer, Bait & Ammo is the debut album of American country music singer Kevin Fowler. It was released on November 21, 2000 on the independent Tin Roof label.

The title track from the album, "Beer, Bait, & Ammo" turned into what All Music Guide described as "somewhat of a Texas anthem" with Mark Chesnutt making the song a part of his live performances, including it on his 2004 album "Savin' the Honky Tonk," and Sammy Kershaw and George Jones each recording cover versions of the song, in 2003 and 2006, respectively.

== Track listing ==
All songs written by Kevin Fowler, unless noted otherwise.

1. "Speak of the Devil" — 4:00
2. "Butterbean" — 2:43
3. "Penny for Your Thoughts" — 4:22
4. "Hellbent for a Heartache" — 3:05
5. "I Found Out the Hard Way" — 3:07
6. "If These Old Walls Could Talk" — 4:16
7. "Beer, Bait, & Ammo" — 5:15
8. "Read Between the Lines" — 3:40
9. "You Could've Had It All" — 4:23
10. "J.O.B." (Fowler, Jack Jeansome) — 4:16
11. "Drinkin' Days" — 4:12
12. "100% Texan" — 3:50
