= One in Every Crowd =

"One In Every Crowd"

Single by Montgomery Gentry

from the album Back When I Knew It All
- Released: January 20, 2009
- Genre: Country
- Length: 3:31
- Label: Columbia Nashville
- Songwriter(s): Ira Dean; Eddie Montgomery; Kim Tribble
- Producer(s): Blake Chancey

Montgomery Gentry singles chronology
"Roll with Me" (2008)	"One In Every Crowd" (2009)	"Long Line of Losers" (2009)

"One in Every Crowd" is a song recorded by American country music duo Montgomery Gentry. It was released in January 2009 as the third single from their album Back When I Knew It All. Eddie Montgomery, one-half of the duo, co-wrote the song with Kim Tribble and former Trick Pony bassist Ira Dean.

== Content ==
"One in Every Crowd" is an up-tempo with electric guitar accompaniment, written by Eddie Montgomery (one-half of Montgomery Gentry), along with Kim Tribble and Ira Dean, the latter of whom was formerly bass guitarist in the group Trick Pony. Montgomery and Troy Gentry, the duo's other half, sing lead vocals. The verses describe a male character at a bar who rouses the patrons until they want to party with him. In the verse, the narrator reveals that the character being described is himself ("There's one in every crowd / And it's usually me"). A backup chorus sings "hey y'all" after the choruses, and begins cheering before the final chorus.

== Critical reception ==
Thom Jurek of AllMusic gave the song a favorable description in his review of Back When I Knew It All. He described the song as "an anthemic, heartland rocker with a crowd-chanting chorus" and "redneck John Mellencamp to the extreme." Allen Jacobs of Roughstock gave the song a positive review saying that the song is "adaptable to the saloon, the radio and the iPod, touching all ages as truly feel-good Pop with an honest message."

== Charts ==
"One in Every Crowd" debuted at number 49 on the Hot Country Songs chart dated February 7, 2009, and entered the top 40 the next week. It is the group's last top 5 hit.

Chart (2009)	Peak position
US Hot Country Songs (Billboard)	5
US Billboard Hot 100	53
Canada Country (Billboard)	6
Canada (Canadian Hot 100)	71

=== Year-end charts ===
Chart (2009)	Position
US Country Songs (Billboard)	40
