= Here's to You (Montgomery Gentry album) =

Studio album by Montgomery Gentry
- Released: February 2, 2018
- Genre: Country
- Length: 40:51
- Label: Average Joes Entertainment
- Producers: Noah Gordon; Shannon Houchins

Montgomery Gentry chronology
Folks Like Us (2015)	Here's to You (2018)	Outskirts (2019)

Singles from Here's to You
- 1. "Better Me" Released: September 15, 2017; 2. "King of the World" Released: February 6, 2018; 3. "Get Down South" Released: April 9, 2018; 4. "Drink Along Song" Released: October 12, 2018; 5. "Crazies Welcome" Released: January 12, 2020

Here's to You is the ninth studio album by country music duo Montgomery Gentry through Average Joes Entertainment. It was released on February 2, 2018, after the death of duo member Troy Gentry. The album includes the single "Better Me".

== Content ==
Prior to the album's release, group member Troy Gentry died in a helicopter crash in September 2017. At the time, the duo had just completed the album for Average Joes Entertainment, and "Better Me" had been released as a single.

Eddie Montgomery, the other half of the duo, said that Gentry had approached him about "Better Me" and wanted to sing lead vocals on the song: "when he heard it, he came to me and said, 'Eddie, I really, really wanna sing this song.' That's the first time that had ever happened."

== Critical reception ==
Stephen Thomas Erlewine of AllMusic rated it 3 out of 5 stars, stating that " is a straight-ahead Montgomery Gentry album, one that is proudly out of step with current fads and designed to please longtime fans."

== Commercial performance ==
The album debuted at No. 3 on Top Country Albums and No. 32 on the Billboard 200, with 13,000 copies (14,000 album equivalent units) sold in the first week. It has sold 20,100 copies in the United States as of March 2018.

== Track listing ==
1. "Shotgun Wedding" (Eddie Montgomery, Gary Hannan, Phil O'Donnell) - 3:21
2. "Better Me" (Josh Hoge, Randy Montana, Jamie Moore) - 3:26
3. "Needing a Beer" (Bobby Pinson, Aaron Raitiere) - 3:44
4. "What'cha Say We Don't" (Brandon Hood, Lee Thomas Miller, Jeffrey Steele) - 3:40
5. "Crazies Welcome" (Jessi Alexander, Lance Miller, Brad Warren, Brett Warren) - 3:37
6. "Get Down South" (Troy Johnson, Bob Moffatt, Clint Moffatt, John Wiggins) - 3:14
7. "Drive On Home" (Craig Campbell, Dave Turnbull, Fred Wilhelm) - 3:04
8. "Feet Back on the Ground" (Casey Beathard, Tony Martin, Neil Thrasher) - 3:19
9. "Drink Along Song" (Jeneé Flenor, Wade Kirby, O'Donnell, Buddy Owens) - 3:05
10. "King of the World" (Troy Jones) - 2:49
11. "That's the Thing About America" (Shane Minor, Steele, Wiseman) - 3:48
12. "All Hell Broke Loose" (Keith Dozier, Adam Fears) - 3:42

== Personnel ==
Adapted from liner notes.

=== Montgomery Gentry ===
- Troy Gentry - vocals (all tracks)
- Eddie Montgomery - vocals (all tracks)

=== Additional musicians ===
- Eddie Bayers - drums (tracks 5, 6, 9)
- Bruce Bouton - steel guitar (tracks 1–4, 7, 8, 10–12)
- Jim "Moose" Brown - piano (tracks 1, 2, 5–9, 11, 12), keyboards (tracks 1, 2, 7, 8, 12), B-3 organ (tracks 5–9, 11, 12)
- Jimmy Carter - bass guitar (tracks 3–6, 9, 10)
- Daniel Dennis - electric guitar (track 11)
- Howard Duck - piano (tracks 3, 4, 10), keyboards (tracks 3, 4, 10)
- Noah Gordon - background vocals (all tracks)
- Kevin "Swine" Grantt - bass guitar (tracks 1, 2, 7, 8, 12)
- Tommy Harden - drums (tracks 1–4, 7, 8, 10–12), percussion (tracks 1–4, 7, 8, 10–12), programming (tracks 1–4, 7, 8, 10–12)
- Jeff King - electric guitar (tracks 3, 4, 10)
- David LaBruyere - bass guitar (track 11)
- Rob McNelley - electric guitar (tracks 1, 2, 6–9, 11, 12)
- Scotty Sanders - steel guitar (tracks 5, 6, 9)
- Bobby Terry - banjo (track 2), acoustic guitar (tracks 3, 4, 10), electric guitar (track 2)
- Eric Varnell - electric guitar (tracks 1, 6), programming (track 1), drum loops (track 6)
- John Willis - banjo (track 9), acoustic guitar (tracks 1, 2, 5–9, 11, 12)

== Charts ==
Album

Chart (2018)	Peak position
US Billboard 200	32
US Top Country Albums (Billboard)	3
US Independent Albums (Billboard)	2

Singles

Year	Single	Peak chart positions	
Year	Single	US Country	US Country Airplay
2017	"Better Me"	40	60
