= Gone (Montgomery Gentry song) =

Single by Montgomery Gentry

from the album You Do Your Thing
- B-side: "If You Ever Stop Loving Me"
- Released: November 15, 2004
- Genre: Country
- Length: 3:28 (single edit); 4:12 (album version)
- Label: Columbia Nashville
- Songwriters: Bob DiPiero, Jeffrey Steele
- Producer: Jeffrey Steele

Montgomery Gentry singles chronology
"You Do Your Thing" (2004)	"Gone" (2004)	"Something to Be Proud Of" (2005)

"Gone" is a song written by Bob DiPiero and Jeffrey Steele, and recorded by the American country music duo Montgomery Gentry. It was released in November 2004 as the third single from the duo's album You Do Your Thing, reaching a peak of #3 on the U.S. country charts, #53 on the Billboard Hot 100 and #92 on the Pop 100. The single has also been certified as a digital gold single by the Recording Industry Association of America. This song is used in the Rock Band Country Track Pack.

== Content ==
"Gone" is a moderate up-tempo featuring accompaniment from electric guitar and Hammond B-3 organ, with Troy Gentry on lead vocals. In it, the male narrator explains that his lover is gone, using a series of similes like "Gone like a freight train, gone like yesterday".

On Montgomery Gentry's website, Gentry explains that he and Eddie Montgomery (the other half of the duo) "knew it was a hit" because the first time they sang the song live, the audience began singing along.

== Chart performance ==
"Gone" debuted at number 45 on the U.S. Billboard Hot Country Singles & Tracks for the week of November 27, 2004. It has sold 521,000 copies in the U.S. as of September 2017.

Chart (2004–2005)	Peak position
Canada Country (Radio & Records)	4
US Hot Country Songs (Billboard)	3
US Billboard Hot 100	53
US Billboard Pop 100	92

=== Year-end charts ===
Chart (2005)	Position
US Country Songs (Billboard)	10

== Certifications ==
Region	Certification	Certified units/sales
United States (RIAA)	Gold	500,000^{^}
^{^} Shipments figures based on certification alone.

== Music video ==
The video was directed by Ivan Dudynsky. It was filmed during the duo's 2004 tour, and premiered on CMT on February 10, 2005.

== Atlanta Braves ==
The Atlanta Braves occasionally use the chorus of this song when one of their players hits a home run at Truist Park.
