= Roll with Me =

- Cover of Colt Ford remix.

Single by Montgomery Gentry

from the album Back When I Knew It All
- Released: July 21, 2008
- Genre: Country
- Length: 3:54
- Label: Columbia Nashville
- Songwriters: Clint Daniels; Tommy Karlas
- Producer: Blake Chancey

Montgomery Gentry singles chronology
"Back When I Knew It All" (2008)	"Roll with Me" (2008)	"One in Every Crowd" (2009)

Music video
- "Roll with Me" at CMT.com

"Roll with Me" is a song written by Clint Daniels and Tommy Karlas, and recorded by American country music duo Montgomery Gentry. It was released in August 2008 as the second single from their album Back When I Knew It All. It became their twentieth single to reach the Top 40 on the Billboard Hot Country Songs charts and on the weeks of December 20—27, 2008, became their fifth and final Number One song.

== Content ==
The song is a mid-tempo ballad, featuring lead vocals from Troy Gentry and background vocals from Five for Fighting. In it, the narrator sings about taking lyrical inspiration from the world around him, and learning the life lessons about which he sings. This sentiment is reflected in the lines "I'm thinking maybe it's time to be livin' the rhyme / When I'm singing a song about nothing but right / And it'd sure be nice if you would roll with me."

According to Country Weekly, songwriter Tommy Karlas wrote the song after he could not sleep due to insomnia. He got together with fellow songwriter Clint Daniels to finish it. Karlas added the second verse when he thought about a high school friend who had died.

Montgomery Gentry released a rap remix with country-rapper Colt Ford as well.

== Critical reception ==
Eddie Montgomery, the other half of the duo, said of the song: "It's got the groove factor; it's just unreal. I think it's the best performance I've ever heard from my brother over here. Emotionally, you can tell when he sings it, it's from the heart."

Reviewing the song for Country Universe, critic Leeann Ward gave the song a C rating. She considered the lyrics cliché and nonsensical but called the melody "rather pleasant sounding". Thom Jurek of Allmusic considered it "obligatory" and "spiritually minded".

== Music video ==
The music video was directed by Steven L. Weaver, and premiered on CMT on July 25, 2008, the video features stop motion animation. An interactive version of the video was also posted on the website Hear Something Country, presenting a 360-degree view of the video. The video features actor Darren Criss.

== Chart performance ==
For the week of December 20, 2008, the song became their second consecutive and fifth and final number one hit, where it remained on top for two weeks. It also has become their second Top 40 hit on the Billboard Hot 100, peaking at number 33.

Chart (2008)	Peak position
US Hot Country Songs (Billboard)	1
US Billboard Hot 100	33
Canada Country (Billboard)	5
Canada Hot 100 (Billboard)	66

=== Year-end charts ===
Chart (2008)	Position
US Country Songs (Billboard)	53
