= Back When I Knew It All (song) =

Single by Montgomery Gentry

from the album Back When I Knew It All
- Released: February 11, 2008
- Genre: Country
- Length: 3:59
- Label: Columbia Nashville
- Songwriters: Gary Hannan; Phil O'Donnell; Trent Willmon
- Producer: Blake Chancey

Montgomery Gentry singles chronology
"What Do Ya Think About That" (2007)	"Back When I Knew It All" (2008)	"Roll with Me" (2008)

"Back When I Knew It All" is a song written by Trent Willmon, Gary Hannan, and Phil O'Donnell, and recorded by American country music duo Montgomery Gentry. It was released in February 2008 as the lead off single and title track from their album of the same name. The song debuted at #49 on the Hot Country Songs chart dated March 1, 2008, and on the chart week of July 12, 2008, it became the duo's fourth Number One hit.

== Content ==
The song is a moderate up-tempo, described as sounding similar to The Byrds. It features both members of the duo describing their later teen years — buying a pickup truck, sneaking into a bar, and even being imprisoned. After reflecting on their experiences, they then list the various lessons they've learned since their rebellious beginnings (such as how "A Sunday sermon can turn life around"), eventually stating that they were "learning so much more than / Back when [they] knew it all".

== Chart performance ==
Chart (2008)	Peak position
US Hot Country Songs (Billboard)	1
US Billboard Hot 100	56
Canada Country (Billboard)	8
Canada Hot 100 (Billboard)	89

=== Year-end charts ===
Chart (2008)	Position
US Country Songs (Billboard)	21
