= Chippin' Away =

Fifth studio album of American country music singer Kevin Fowler

Studio album by Kevin Fowler
- Released: August 9, 2011
- Genre: Country
- Length: 36:49
- Label: Average Joe's
- Producers: Daren Fleming; David Lee Murphy; Ken Tondre

Kevin Fowler chronology
Best Of… So Far (2010)	Chippin' Away (2011)	How Country Are Ya? (2014)

Singles from Chippin' Away
- 1. "Girl in a Truck" Released: 2011; 2. "Hell Yeah, I Like Beer" Released: 2011; 3. "That Girl" Released: September 12, 2011; 4. "Here's to Me and You" Released: 2012

Professional ratings
Review scores
Source	Rating
Allmusic	3/5 stars

Chippin' Away is the fifth studio album of American country music singer Kevin Fowler. It was released on August 9, 2011.

== Track listing ==
No.	Title	Writer(s)	Length
1.	"That Girl"	Kevin Fowler, Clint Ingersoll, Trent Willmon	3:28
2.	"Hell Yeah, I Like Beer"	Fowler, Shane Minor, David Lee Murphy	3:27
3.	"Here's to Me and You"	Rhett Akins, Dallas Davidson, Fowler, Ben Hayslip	3:11
4.	"Daddies and Daughters"	Fowler, Brandon Kinney, Willmon	3:39
5.	"Beer Money"	Ira Dean, Fowler, Kim Tribble	3:16
6.	"Girl in a Truck"	Fowler, Liz Rose	2:51
7.	"Borderline Crazy"	Greg Barnhill, Kris Bergsnes, Jeremy Stover	3:10
8.	"Big River"	Fowler, Minor, Murphy	3:24
9.	"Do That with You Gone"	Fowler, Ingersoll	3:44
10.	"Chippin' Away"	Fowler, Brice Long, Murphy	3:13
11.	"Knocked Up" (live)	Terry Anderson, Fowler	3:26

== Chart performance ==
=== Album ===
Chart (2011)	Peak position
US Billboard 200	81
US Billboard Top Country Albums	19
US Billboard Independent Albums	8

=== Singles ===
Year	Single	Peak positions
Year	Single	US Country
2011	"Girl in a Truck"	—
2011	"Hell Yeah, I Like Beer"	—
2011	"That Girl"	45
2012	"Here's to Me and You"	—
"—" denotes releases that did not chart
