= Daddy Won't Sell the Farm =

Single by Montgomery Gentry

from the album Tattoos & Scars
- Released: November 2, 1999
- Recorded: 1998
- Genre: Country
- Length: 4:18
- Label: Columbia Nashville
- Songwriters: Robin Branda; Steve Fox
- Producer: Joe Scaife

Montgomery Gentry singles chronology
"Lonely and Gone" (1999)	"Daddy Won't Sell the Farm" (1999)	"Self Made Man" (2000)

"Daddy Won't Sell the Farm" is a song written by Robin Branda and Steve Fox and recorded by American country music duo Montgomery Gentry. It was released in November 1999 as the third single from the duo's 1999 debut album Tattoos & Scars. The song peaked at number 17 on the US Billboard Hot Country Singles and Tracks chart and at number 19 on the RPM Canada Country Tracks chart.

== Content ==
"Daddy Won't Sell the Farm" calls attention to the growing problem of urban sprawl. The song's protagonist is a farmer who, despite the city growing around him, stands firm in refusing to sell his land to developers.

== Music video ==
The music video was directed by Chris Rogers, and mostly features the duo on their concert tour. Some other scenes of the video were filmed in Goodell, Iowa. The music video premiered on GAC on November 11, 1999.

== Chart positions ==
Chart (1999–2000)	Peak position
Canada Country Singles (RPM)	19
US Billboard Hot 100	79
US Hot Country Songs (Billboard)	17

=== Year-end charts ===
Chart (2000)	Position
US Country Songs (Billboard)	67
