= High on the Hog (Kevin Fowler album) =

Studio album by Kevin Fowler
- Released: August 6, 2002
- Genre: Country
- Length: 46:53
- Label: Tin Roof
- Producer: Daren Fleming; Kevin Fowler

Kevin Fowler chronology
Beer, Bait & Ammo (2000)	High on the Hog (2002)	Live at Billy Bob's Texas (2002)

Professional ratings
Review scores
Source	Rating
Allmusic	3/5 stars

High on the Hog is the second studio album of American country music singer Kevin Fowler. It was released on August 6, 2002, as his second album for the independent Tin Roof label.

== Track listing ==
All songs written by Kevin Fowler, unless noted otherwise.

1. "There's a Fool Born Everyday" — 4:05
2. "Senorita Mas Fina" (Fowler, Clay Blaker) — 3:21
3. "Not Lovin' Anymore" — 4:30
4. "The Lord Loves the Drinkin' Man" — 4:37
5. "A Fool and His Heart" — 3:45
6. "Our Love is a Prison" (Fowler, Jay Lamb, John Owens) — 3:44
7. "She Ain't Bad But She Ain't You" — 3:54
8. "Tall Drink of Water" — 2:50
9. "High on the Hog" — 4:06
10. "All the Tequila in Tijuana" — 3:44
11. "Ol' What's Her Name" — 3:46
12. "Fat Bottomed Girls" (Brian May) — 4:31

== Chart performance ==
Chart (2002)	Peak position
US Billboard Top Country Albums	54
