= Something to Be Proud Of =

Single by Montgomery Gentry

from the album You Do Your Thing
- Released: May 9, 2005
- Recorded: 2004
- Genre: Country
- Length: 4:18
- Label: Columbia Nashville
- Songwriters: Jeffrey Steele; Chris Wallin
- Producer: Jeffrey Steele

Montgomery Gentry singles chronology
"Gone" (2004)	"Something to Be Proud Of" (2005)	"She Don't Tell Me To" (2005)

"Something to Be Proud Of" is a song written by Jeffrey Steele and Chris Wallin, and recorded by American country music duo Montgomery Gentry. It was released in May 2005 as the fourth and final single from their album You Do Your Thing. The song reached the top of the Billboard Hot Country Songs chart on October 8, 2005.

== Content ==
The father of the narrator compares the narrator's way of life as a father and a husband to his own achievements during the Desert Storm operation.

== Critical reception ==
Kevin John Coyne, reviewing the song for Country Universe, gave it a negative rating. He summarized his review by saying the song is a "warmed-over, second-rate John Mellencamp."

== Music video ==
The music video was directed by Wes Edwards, and premiered on CMT on July 14, 2005.

== Chart positions ==
"Something to Be Proud Of" debuted at number 56 on the U.S. Billboard Hot Country Songs for the week of May 21, 2005. It spent two weeks at number 1, making it the first single from Columbia Records Nashville to spend more than one week at the top since "Daddy's Money" by Ricochet in 1996. The song has sold 579,000 copies in the United States as of September 2017.

Chart (2005)	Peak position
Canada Country (Radio & Records)	5
US Hot Country Songs (Billboard)	1
US Billboard Hot 100	41

=== Year-end charts ===
Chart (2005)	Position
US Country Songs (Billboard)	17

== Certifications ==
Region	Certification	Certified units/sales
United States (RIAA)	Platinum	1,000,000^{‡}
^{‡} Sales+streaming figures based on certification alone.
