= Hillbilly Shoes =

Single by Montgomery Gentry

from the album Tattoos & Scars
- B-side: "All Night Long"
- Released: February 22, 1999
- Genre: Country
- Length: 3:13
- Label: Columbia Nashville
- Songwriters: Bobby Taylor, Mike Geiger, Woody Mullis
- Producer: Joe Scaife

Montgomery Gentry singles chronology
"Hillbilly Shoes" (1999)	"Lonely and Gone" (1999)

"Hillbilly Shoes" is a song recorded by American country music duo Montgomery Gentry. It was released in February 1999 as their debut single and the lead-off single to their debut album Tattoos & Scars. It peaked at number 13 in the United States, and number 7 in Canada. It was written by Bobby Taylor, Mike Geiger and Woody Mullis. The song features Troy Gentry singing lead but in some parts there's Eddie Montgomery singing alone as lead vocals.

== Critical reception ==
Deborah Evans Price, of Billboard magazine reviewed the song favorably, calling it a "high-energy brand of traditional country blended with loads of outlaw attitude." She goes and says that the song has an "absolutely infectious guitar riff, sassy sawing fiddles, and Gentry's high-octane lead vocal."

== Music video ==
The music video was directed by Chris Rogers and premiered in early 1999.

== Chart positions ==
"Hillbilly Shoes" debuted at number 70 on the U.S. Billboard Hot Country Singles & Tracks for the week of February 13, 1999.

Chart (1999)	Peak position
Canada Country Singles (RPM)	7
US Billboard Hot 100	62
US Hot Country Songs (Billboard)	13

=== Year-end charts ===
Chart (1999)	Position
Canada Country Tracks (RPM)	47
US Country Songs (Billboard)	62
