= Some People Change (song) =

Single by Montgomery Gentry

from the album Some People Change
- Released: August 29, 2006
- Genre: Country
- Length: 3:23
- Label: Columbia Nashville
- Songwriters: Neil Thrasher; Jason Sellers; Michael Dulaney
- Producers: Troy Gentry; Eddie Montgomery; Mark Wright

Montgomery Gentry singles chronology
"She Don't Tell Me To" (2005)	"Some People Change" (2006)	"Lucky Man" (2007)

"Some People Change" is a song written by Neil Thrasher, Jason Sellers and Michael Dulaney. It was originally recorded by American country music artist Kenny Chesney for his 2004 album When the Sun Goes Down. It was then recorded by Canadian country music artist George Canyon for his 2006 album Somebody Wrote Love. Finally, American country music duo Montgomery Gentry recorded their version of the song and released it as a single. It was released in August 2006 as the lead single from their 2006 album of the same name. It peaked at number 7 on the U.S. Billboard Hot Country Songs chart and at number 57 on the U.S. Billboard Hot 100.

== Content ==
The song is about people who change their ways. The first verse describes a man who harbors racist beliefs from his father until "the grace of God got in the way", and the second verse is about a female alcoholic who abandons her habit once she thinks about "everyone she's letting down". In the third verse, a group of gospel singers joins in the song.

Montgomery Gentry's version features Eddie Montgomery on the verses, Troy Gentry on the chorus and bridge, and a choir joining on the last chorus. Their version is in the key of D major with a main chord pattern of D-G and a vocal range of two octaves, from A3 to A5.

== Critical reception ==
Thom Jurek of Allmusic said of Montgomery Gentry's version that it was "one of those tunes that defines something that lies at the heart of what is good about Americans." Kevin John Coyne of Country Universe wrote "The message is more powerful coming from two guys who have carefully crafted a drinkin’, rebel-rousin’ image. I could do without the choir at the end, but other than that, this is one of their better hits."

== Music video ==
The music video for Montgomery Gentry's version was directed by Trey Fanjoy. It starts out with the band playing at an outdoor church festival, inside a tent. The scene cuts away to a young Neo-Nazi who is kneeling by a small fire. He begins to cry, and then proceeds to toss his Ku Klux Klan uniform in the fire. He then "raises up a brand new man." The video cuts to a woman drinking whiskey while her young daughter colors. The woman then quits for her daughter's sake. She throws the bottle against the wall, opens the curtains, and embraces her daughter. The video then returns to the duo singing while the boy and woman look on in the audience. Towards the end, a gospel choir dances in and begins to sing along with the chorus.

== Chart positions ==
Chart (2006)	Peak position
US Hot Country Songs (Billboard)	7
US Billboard Hot 100	57
Canada Country (Billboard)	14
