= Lonely and Gone =

Single by Montgomery Gentry

from the album Tattoos & Scars
- B-side: "I've Loved a Lot Than I've Hurt"
- Released: June 22, 1999
- Recorded: 1999
- Genre: Country
- Length: 3:18
- Label: Columbia Nashville
- Songwriters: Bill McCorvey, Dave Gibson, Greg Crowe
- Producer: Joe Scaife

Montgomery Gentry singles chronology
"Hillbilly Shoes" (1999)	"Lonely and Gone" (1999)	"Daddy Won't Sell the Farm" (1999)

"Lonely and Gone" is a song recorded by American country music duo Montgomery Gentry. It was released in June 1999 as the second single from their debut album Tattoos & Scars. It peaked at No. 5, thus becoming their first Top 5 hit. The song was co-written by Bill McCorvey, Dave Gibson and Greg Crowe.

== Music video ==
The music video features the duo going through a house on the corner of "Lonely and Gone", and throughout the video, a lightning bolt struck the house. By the end of the video, the house is an inferno. The music video was directed by Chris Rogers. It premiered on CMT on June 16, 1999.

== Chart positions ==
Chart (1999)	Peak position
Canada Country Singles (RPM)	11
US Billboard Hot 100	46
US Hot Country Songs (Billboard)	5

=== Year-end charts ===
Chart (1999)	Position
US Country Songs (Billboard)	32
