= If You Ever Stop Loving Me =

Single by Montgomery Gentry

from the album You Do Your Thing
- B-side: "Gone"
- Released: February 2, 2004
- Genre: Country, country rock
- Length: 3:24 (album version); 3:03 (single version)
- Label: Columbia Nashville
- Songwriters: Bob DiPiero; Rivers Rutherford; Tom Shapiro
- Producer: Rivers Rutherford

Montgomery Gentry singles chronology
"Hell Yeah" (2003)	"If You Ever Stop Loving Me" (2004)	"You Do Your Thing" (2004)

"If You Ever Stop Loving Me" is a song by Bob DiPiero, Rivers Rutherford and Tom Shapiro and recorded by American country music duo Montgomery Gentry. It was released in February 2004 as the first single to the duo's 2004 album You Do Your Thing. The song became their first number one single on the US Billboard Hot Country Songs charts. It also was their biggest hit on the Billboard Hot 100, where it reached number 30.

== Content ==
The narrator is a man who experienced tough experiences in life, but as long as his significant other stays with him he can handle anything.

== Critical reception ==
Billboard magazine reviewed the song favorably saying that Gentry delivers a "solid performance that is full of personality." The production was reviewed as "an edgy, groove-laden framework, punctuating the duo's gutsy performance with crunchy guitars and driving production."

== Music video ==
The music video was directed by Trey Fanjoy, and premiered on CMT on February 18, 2004.

== Chart positions ==
"If You Ever Stop Loving Me" debuted at number 58 on the U.S. Billboard Hot Country Singles & Tracks for the week of February 7, 2004.

Chart (2004)	Peak position
Canada Country (Radio & Records)	3
US Hot Country Songs (Billboard)	1
US Billboard Hot 100	30

=== Year-end charts ===
Chart (2004)	Position
US Country Songs (Billboard)	13
