= She Couldn't Change Me =

Single by Montgomery Gentry

from the album Carrying On
- Released: February 5, 2001
- Genre: Country
- Length: 4:20 (album version)
- Label: Columbia Nashville
- Songwriters: Gary Nicholson; Chris Knight
- Producer: Joe Scaife

Montgomery Gentry singles chronology
"All Night Long" (2000)	"She Couldn't Change Me" (2001)	"Cold One Comin' On" (2001)

"She Couldn't Change Me" is a song written by Gary Nicholson and Chris Knight and recorded by American country music duo Montgomery Gentry. It was released in February 2001 as the first single from the duo's 2001 album Carrying On. The song peaked at number 2 on the US Billboard Hot Country Songs chart and at number 37 on the Billboard Hot 100, making it one of their highest-peaking crossover songs.

== Content ==
In the first verse, the song's narrator's woman leaves him and heads out west because "she couldn't change [him]." In the second verse, she starts to think about the quiet country nights with him, and "Whatever she thought was so wrong with [him] / Suddenly seemed alright". Then she heads back to him, and she says that "when you love someone, you just gotta let it be."

== Critical reception ==
Deborah Evans Price of Billboard magazine reviewed the song favorably, calling it a solid single and saying that Montgomery Gentry delivers the song with an "edgy energy that is immensely appealing."

== Music video ==
The music video was directed by Guy Guillet, and features the duo standing on a mountaintop. Throughout the video, a woman paints the bedroom blue, driving a pickup truck, changing her hair from brown to blonde, and back to brown. During the last scene of the music video, a woman looks directly into the camera.

== Chart positions ==
"She Couldn't Change Me" debuted at #53 on the U.S. Billboard Hot Country Singles & Tracks for the chart week of February 10, 2001.

Chart (2001)	Peak position
US Hot Country Songs (Billboard)	2
US Billboard Hot 100	37

=== Year-end charts ===
Chart (2001)	Position
US Country Songs (Billboard)	7
