= My Town (Montgomery Gentry song) =

Single by Montgomery Gentry

from the album My Town
- Released: June 3, 2002
- Recorded: 2002
- Genre: Country
- Length: 4:10 (single edit); 4:46 (album version)
- Label: Columbia Nashville
- Songwriters: Reed Nielsen; Jeffrey Steele
- Producer: Blake Chancey

Montgomery Gentry singles chronology
"Didn't I" (2002)	"My Town" (2002)	"Speed" (2002)

"My Town" is a song written by Reed Nielsen and Jeffrey Steele and recorded by American country music duo Montgomery Gentry. It was released in June 2002 as the lead-off single and title track to their album of the same name. It peaked on the U.S. country chart at #5 and also peaked at #40 on the Billboard Hot 100, making it one of their highest peaking crossover singles.

After the death of member Troy Gentry, Eddie Montgomery, the other member of the duo, sang the song with Dierks Bentley and Rascal Flatts as a tribute during the 51st Annual Country Music Association Awards on November 8, 2017.

== Content ==
The narrator describes his hometown.

== Commercial performance ==
"My Town" debuted at No. 57 on the U.S. Billboard Hot Country Singles & Tracks for the week of June 8, 2002. It peaked at No. 5 on the chart. The song has sold 376,000 copies in the United States as of September 2017.

== Music video ==
The music video was directed by Guy Guillet and features the duo on their tour bus, driving through what Montgomery Gentry calls "My Town." In the video, Eddie Montgomery points to the Perryville water tower and the Perryville sign. The video also shows the Perryville Elementary School. Perryville is in western Boyle County, Kentucky, in the United States and has a population of 751. Eddie was born only 10 minutes away from Perryville in Danville, Kentucky. Also shown in the video is Montgomery Gentry playing on a stage in Lexington, Kentucky, which is about 42 miles northeast of Perryville. Lexington was the hometown of Troy Gentry.

== Charts ==
=== Weekly charts ===
Chart (2002)	Peak position
US Hot Country Songs (Billboard)	5
US Billboard Hot 100	40

=== Year-end charts ===
Chart (2002)	Position
US Country Songs (Billboard)	37

== Certifications ==
Region	Certification	Certified units/sales
United States (RIAA)	Gold	500,000^{‡}
^{‡} Sales+streaming figures based on certification alone.

== Parodies ==
- American country music parody artist Cledus T. Judd released a parody of "My Town" titled "My Crowd" on his 2003 album A Six Pack of Judd.
