= Kevin Fowler =

American singer-songwriter

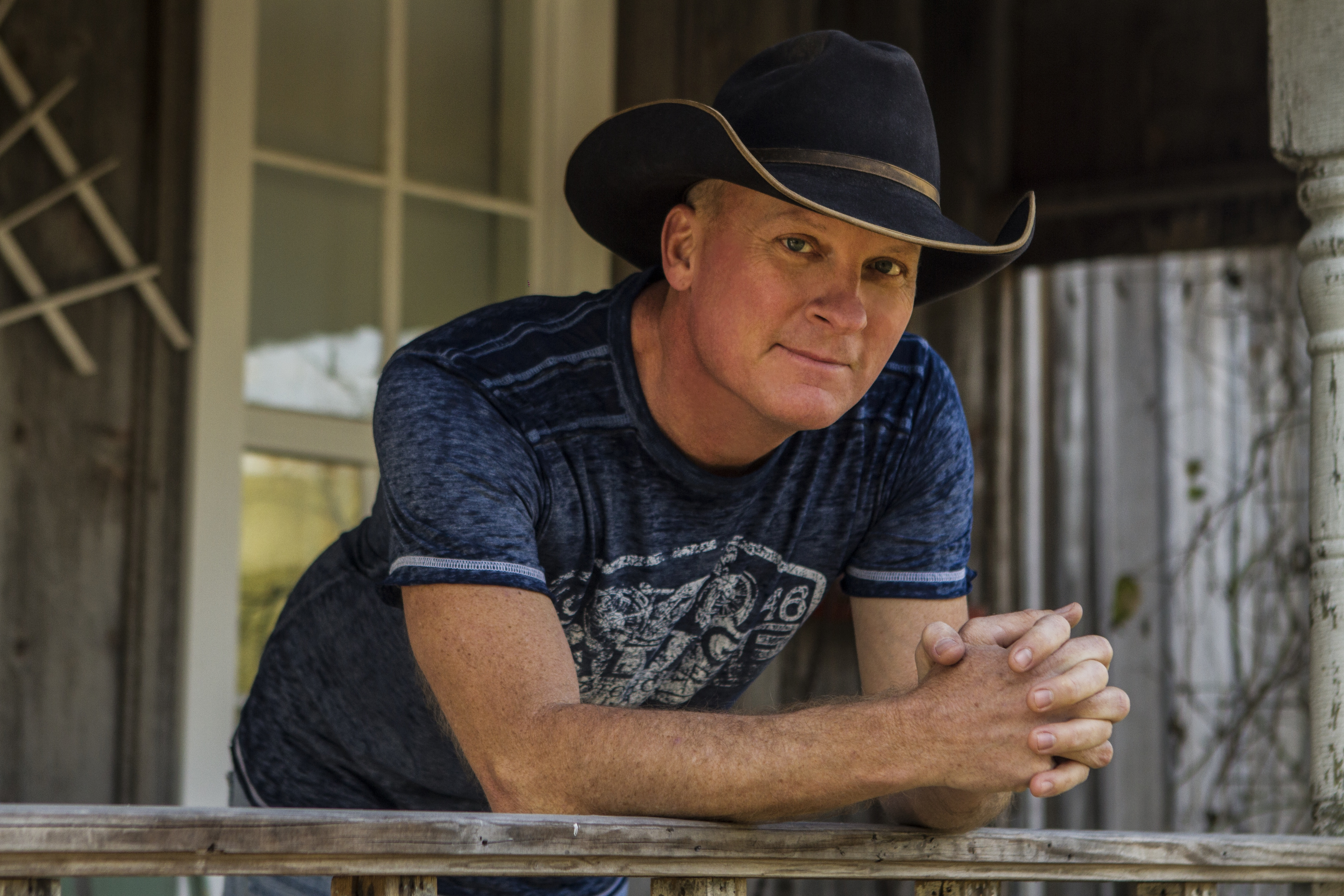
- Fowler in 2016

Background information
- Born: May 11, 1966 (age 60); Amarillo, Texas, U.S.
- Origin: Amarillo, Texas, U.S.
- Genre: Country
- Occupation: Singer-songwriter
- Instruments: Vocals, guitar, piano
- Years active: 2000–present
- Labels: Tin Roof; Equity; Super Loud; Lyric Street; Average Joe's Entertainment
- Formerly of: Dangerous Toys
- Website: http://www.kevinfowler.com

Kevin Fowler (born May 11, 1966) is an American singer-songwriter. He has released five studio albums, and has charted four singles on the Billboard Hot Country Songs charts, including the top 40 hit "Pound Sign (#?*!)". In addition, he wrote Sammy Kershaw's 2003 single "Beer, Bait & Ammo", Mark Chesnutt's 2004 single "The Lord Loves the Drinkin' Man" and Montgomery Gentry's 2009 single "Long Line of Losers".

== Early life ==
Fowler was born in Amarillo, Texas, the younger of two children. His father introduced him to country music when he was a child, and as a teenager Fowler also developed a liking for rock music. He graduated in 1984 from Tascosa High School in Amarillo. Long interested in making music, Fowler began piano lessons as a young child. When he was twenty, he realized that he wanted to seriously pursue a career in music and moved to Los Angeles, California, to attend the Guitar Institute of Technology. For the next year, he learned how to play the guitar and began writing songs.

After gaining a good knowledge of the guitar, Fowler left Los Angeles for Austin, Texas. He was a guitarist with the rock band Dangerous Toys in the early 1990s, but left to form his own Southern hard-rock band, Thunderfoot. In 1998, he left rock music all together to form a new band that would concentrate instead on Texas country music. Fowler and his new band earned themselves a weekly gig at Babe's on Sixth Street in Austin. Two years later, with no recording contracts, Fowler recorded and released his own debut album, Beer, Bait & Ammo. This album sold over 30,000 copies in Texas, with the title track receiving a great deal of airplay. This song was popular enough that Mark Chesnutt began playing it in his live show and recorded it for his 2004 album Savin' the Honky Tonk, and Sammy Kershaw recorded it for one of his own albums.

== Career ==
Fowler signed with country singer Clint Black's independent Equity Music (a label distributed by Koch Entertainment) and released two additional albums for that label until Equity ceased operations in December 2008. Montgomery Gentry recorded a cover of Fowler's "Long Line of Losers."

In January 2010, Fowler signed to Lyric Street Records, releasing "Beer Season" that same month. His second single, "Pound Sign (#?*!)," followed in April. That same month, Lyric Street Records announced its closure, and Fowler was one of four artists to be transferred to parent company Disney Music Group. In May 2010, "Pound Sign" became Fowler's first Top 40 hit on the country music charts, peaking at No. 34.

Fowler also collaborated with country rap artist Colt Ford on the song Hip Hop in a Honky Tonk, on Ford's 2010 song Chicken & Biscuits, in which he sings vocals on the song's chorus. In 2011, Fowler signed to Ford's label, Average Joe's Entertainment. In early 2011, Fowler released the single "Girl in a Truck," which hit number 1 on the Texas Music Chart released February 21, 2011. The song was released regionally to radio stations in the Texas and Oklahoma areas. Fowler's sixth album, Chippin' Away, was released via Average Joe's Entertainment in 2011.

Fowler's single, "Here's To Me and You," peaked at No. 1 on the Texas Music Chart and held that position for 3 weeks in a row. The official music video for "Here's To Me and You" premiered on CMT.com on September 19, 2012. On November 21, Fowler released a limited-time only free download of a brand new, unreleased song, "Santa Got Busted By The Border Patrol."

On September 24, 2013, Fowler released a new single, "How Country Are Ya?" The single is the title track of Fowler's seventh studio album. On January 21, 2014, Fowler released a new single, "Love Song," from the album. The album, How Country Are Ya?, was released on March 4, 2014. "Before Somebody Gets Hurt" (feat. Amy Rankin of The Rankin Twins), Fowler's fourth single off of the "How Country Are Ya?" album, hit No. 1 on the Texas Music Charts on June 8, 2015.

During 2013 and 2014, Fowler starred in television commercials for Benny Boyd Auto Group, Rodeo Austin and the Texas Department of Transportation. Fowler previewed music from an upcoming record in March 2016. From the preview, he released his new single "Sellout Song" feat. Zane Williams in April 2016. On Friday, October 21, 2016, Kevin Fowler released Coming to a Honky Tonk Near You, an eight-song album featuring "Texas Forever." In 2017, Fowler was featured in a television commercial for the Texas Commission on Environmental Quality. Fowler was promoting the "Take Care of Texas" campaign regarding state parks and environmental education.

== Discography ==
- Beer, Bait & Ammo (2000)
- High on the Hog (2002)
- Live at Billy Bob's Texas (2002)
- Loose, Loud & Crazy (2004)
- Bring It On (2007)
- Chippin' Away (2011)
- How Country Are Ya? (2014)
- Coming to a Honky Tonk Near You (2016)
- Barstool Stories (2019)
- Dos Borrachos w/ Roger Creager (2019)
