= Montgomery Gentry =

American country music duo

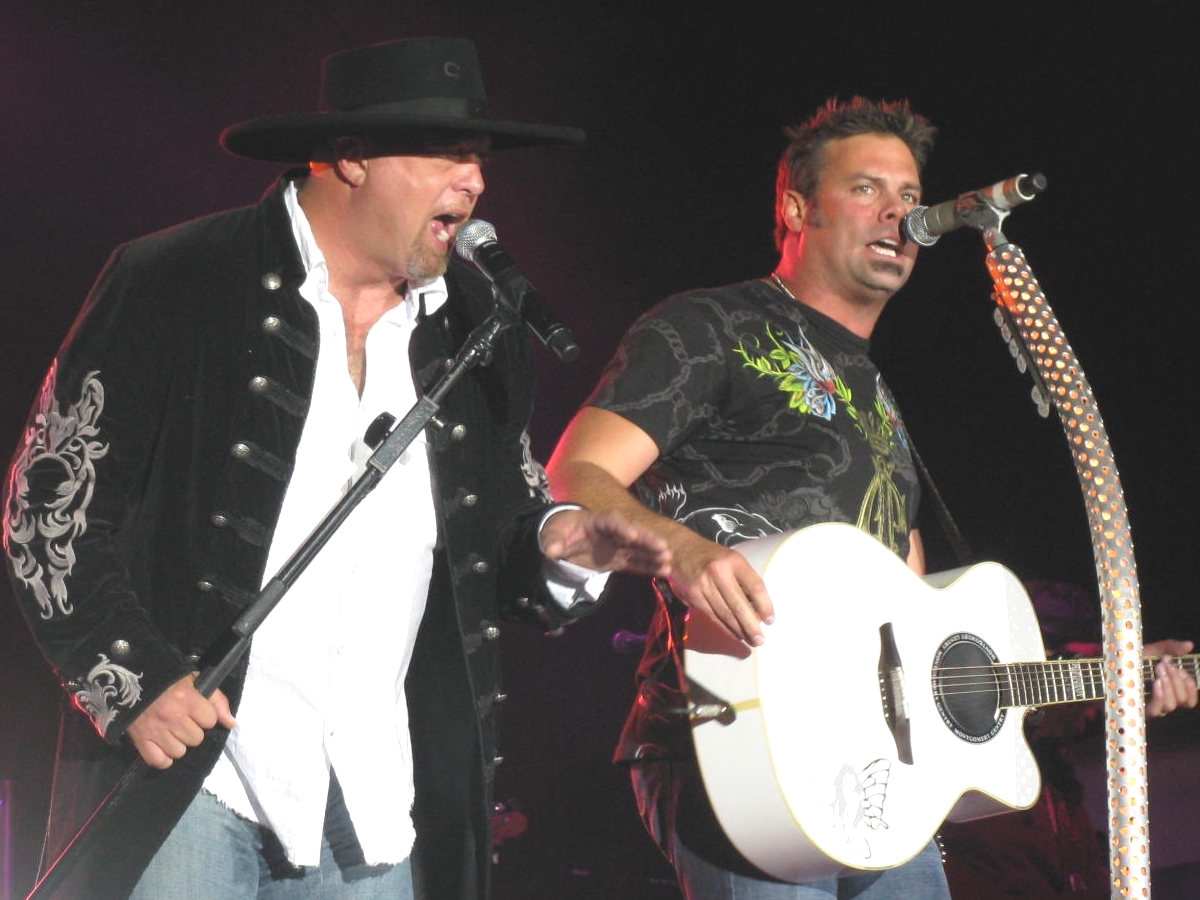
- Eddie Montgomery (left) and Troy Gentry at the 2008 Gretna Heritage Festival in Gretna, Louisiana

Background information
- Also known as: Young Country, Deuce
- Origin: Summit, Kentucky, U.S.
- Genres: Country; Southern rock; country rock
- Years active: 1993–2017 (as a duo act); 2017–present (as a solo act)
- Labels: Columbia Nashville; Average Joes Entertainment; Blaster Records
- Spinoff of: Early Tymz
- Members: Eddie Montgomery
- Past members: Troy Gentry
- Website: montgomerygentry.com

Montgomery Gentry is an American country music duo/solo act founded by singers Eddie Montgomery and Troy Gentry, both Kentucky natives. They began performing together in the 1990s as part of two different bands with Montgomery's brother, John Michael Montgomery. Although Gentry won a talent contest in 1994, he reunited with Eddie Montgomery after Gentry was unable to find a solo record deal, and Montgomery Gentry was formed in 1999. The duo is known for its Southern rock influences, and has collaborated with Charlie Daniels, Toby Keith, Five for Fighting, and members of The Allman Brothers Band.

Montgomery Gentry released six studio albums for Columbia Records' Nashville division: Tattoos & Scars (1999), Carrying On (2001), My Town (2002), You Do Your Thing (2004), Some People Change (2006), and Back When I Knew It All (2008), and a Greatest Hits package. These albums produced more than twenty chart singles on the Billboard Hot Country Songs chart, including the No. 1 hits, "If You Ever Stop Loving Me", "Something to Be Proud Of", "Lucky Man", "Back When I Knew It All", and "Roll with Me". Ten more of their songs reached the Top 10 on the country chart, including the No. 3 hit, "Gone", the most played country song by a duo in 2005. Tattoos & Scars, My Town, and You Do Your Thing are all certified platinum by the Recording Industry Association of America. In 1999, they were awarded Favorite New Artist—Country at the American Music Awards. Both the Academy of Country Music and Country Music Association named them Duo of the Year in 2000, awards for which they were nominated by one or both associations in every year until 2012. In 2009, they were inducted into the Grand Ole Opry.

On September 8, 2017, Gentry died in a helicopter crash in Medford, New Jersey where the duo was scheduled to perform that evening. The helicopter pilot died at the scene and Gentry died as he was being rushed to the hospital. Despite Gentry's death, Montgomery continues to tour under the Montgomery Gentry name and has pursued a solo career.

== History ==
Gerald Edward Montgomery was born September 30, 1963, in Danville, Kentucky. Troy Lee Gentry (April 5, 1967 – September 8, 2017) was born in Lexington, Kentucky. When Montgomery was 13 years old, he played drums in his parents' band, Harold Montgomery and the Kentucky River Express. In 1990, Montgomery founded the band Early Tymz, which included his younger brother, John Michael Montgomery, and Troy Gentry.

After Early Tymz disbanded, the Montgomery brothers and Gentry briefly performed as Young Country, with John Michael as lead vocalist. John Michael left for a solo career in the early 1990s. Gentry went solo and won the Jim Beam National Talent Contest in 1994, which led to him opening for Patty Loveless and Tracy Byrd. Gentry initially wanted to pursue a solo career but after he was unable to find a record deal, he reunited with Eddie Montgomery to form a duo called Deuce, which played at local nightclubs. The duo later changed its name to Montgomery Gentry, and signed with Columbia Records' Nashville division in 1999.

== Musical career ==
=== 1999–2000: Tattoos & Scars ===
Montgomery Gentry released its debut single, "Hillbilly Shoes", in early 1999. It entered the Billboard country singles charts two weeks before its scheduled release date, peaking at No. 13 on the country charts and 62 on the Billboard Hot 100. High radio demand for the single led to the label advancing the release date of the duo's debut album, Tattoos & Scars, from early May to April 6.

"Lonely and Gone" was the album's second single, peaking at No. 5 on the country charts by year's end. The song was co-written by Dave Gibson and former Pirates of the Mississippi lead singer Bill McCorvey. The top 20 "Daddy Won't Sell the Farm", which won its co-writer, Canadian country singer Steve Fox, the 2000 Society of Composers, Authors, and Music Publishers of Canada (SOCAN) award for Song of the Year, followed. After that, Montgomery Gentry had two No. 31 singles "Self Made Man" and "All Night Long". The latter, featuring guest vocals from Charlie Daniels, was previously the b-side to "Hillbilly Shoes". It was also Daniels' first appearance in the top 40 since "Mister DJ" in 1990. The duo won the Vocal Duo of the Year award at the Country Music Association Awards in late 2000, the first time in eight years that Brooks & Dunn did not win this award. They also won the Top New Vocal Duo or Group award from the Academy of Country Music and the 2000 Favorite New Artist—Country award at the American Music Awards. By the end of 2000, Montgomery Gentry charted at No. 38 with a cover of Robert Earl Keen's "Merry Christmas from the Family", itself the b-side to "All Night Long". Tattoos & Scars was certified platinum by the Recording Industry Association of America (RIAA) in 2001, for shipments of one million copies.

The album received generally positive reviews for the duo's Southern rock influences. Thom Jurek of Allmusic gave it four stars out of five, calling it "one of the best pop records of the year. Period." and Alanna Nash of Entertainment Weekly rated it "B", saying that the album was "testosterone-laden". In comparison, Country Standard Time reviewer Jeffrey B. Remz thought that many of the duo's songs lacked distinctiveness, saying they seemed to be derivative of Daniels and Travis Tritt.

=== 2001–2002: Carrying On ===
Montgomery Gentry's second album, Carrying On, was released in mid-2001. Lead-off single "She Couldn't Change Me" peaked at No. 2 on the country charts and number 37 on the Hot 100, making their first Top 40 entry there. The album's only other single, "Cold One Comin' On", reached number 23 on the country charts. Also included on the album was a cover of Waylon Jennings' "I'm a Ramblin' Man". In March 2002, they charted at No. 45 with the track "Didn't I", a cut from the soundtrack to the film We Were Soldiers which was never officially released as a single. The duo promoted the album both on a headline tour sponsored by Jim Beam, and on the Brooks & Dunn Neon Circus & Wild West Tour, which included Toby Keith and Keith Urban. Later in 2002, they toured with Kenny Chesney on his No Shoes, No Shirt, No Problems tour.

Mike Kraski, the senior vice president of sales and marketing at Sony Music Nashville, said that Carrying On showed an artistic growth over Tattoos & Scars, and the duo itself felt Carrying On was more "edgy" in comparison. It was less favorably received than its predecessor; William Ruhlmann wrote that many of the songs "sound like they're trying to [sic] hard to be macho", and Country Standard Time's Mike Clark said that the duo was "playing it safe", although he described the singles favorably. The album was certified gold for shipments of 500,000 copies.

=== 2002–2004: My Town ===
On August 27, 2002, Montgomery Gentry released My Town. After working with producer Joe Scaife on their first two albums, they switched to Blake Chancey who allowed them to pick different session musicians than typically used on mainstream country albums, including Chuck Leavell and Johnny Neel of The Allman Brothers Band, whose "Good Clean Fun" was covered on it. They also chose songs co-written by songwriters who had not appeared on their previous albums, including Jeffrey Steele and Rivers Rutherford. The album produced three singles, all co-written by Steele: the title track and "Speed" both at No. 5, and "Hell Yeah" at No. 4. Along with Blake Shelton and Andy Griggs, they contributed a guest appearance on Tracy Byrd's mid-2003 single "The Truth About Men", which made the country top 20. In March 2004, My Town became the duo's second platinum-certified album.

Ruhlmann gave the album a generally positive review, saying that it "rocks harder as it goes along". On the same site, Rick Cohoon lauded "My Town" for "painting in words and music both the pace of living in a small town", and "Speed" for being "slower and more deliberate than the recklessness the title suggests". On Country Standard Time, Tom Netherland commended it as being "their third and finest release".

=== 2004–2006: You Do Your Thing and Something To Be Proud Of: The Best Of 1999–2005 ===
You Do Your Thing, their fourth album, was issued in mid-2004. It was led off by "If You Ever Stop Loving Me", which in mid-2004 became Montgomery Gentry's first No. 1 single on the country charts. It was also their biggest hit on the Hot 100, reaching No. 30 there. Next, the album's title track went to No. 22 on the country charts, while "Gone" peaked at number 3 and "Something to Be Proud Of" became their second No. 1 single. The song spent two weeks at No. 1, thus making it the first single for Columbia Records' Nashville division to spend more than one week at No. 1 since "Daddy's Money" by Ricochet in 1996. "Gone" was also the most-played single by a country music duo in 2005, and it received a digital gold certification for 500,000 certified music downloads. You Do Your Thing became their third platinum-selling album. Scaife, Chancey, Rutherford, Steele, and Mark Wright split production duties on the album. Steele also co-wrote "Gone" and "Something to Be Proud Of" with Bob DiPiero and Chris Wallin, respectively, while Rutherford and DiPiero co-wrote "If You Ever Stop Loving Me" with Tom Shapiro. In October 2005, You Do Your Thing became the duo's third platinum album. Rick Bell gave the album a favorable review on Country Standard Time, saying that the duo "unleash [Southern rock] in a torrent of brash lyrics, wailing guitars, and pounding percussion". Jurek wrote that it "is easily the finest outing by modern country's most relevant duo; it rocks, it's soulful, and it's memorable". Montgomery Gentry toured in late 2004 – early 2005 with Trace Adkins in support of the album.

"Something to Be Proud Of" also was the title track to Montgomery Gentry's first greatest hits album, Something to Be Proud Of: The Best of 1999–2005. Also included on this disc were "Didn't I", "Merry Christmas from the Family" and the new song "She Don't Tell Me To" (also co-written by Rutherford, Shapiro, and DiPiero), which peaked at No. 5 on the country charts in early 2006. Something to Be Proud Of was certified gold.

=== 2006–2007: Some People Change ===
Some People Change was the title of Montgomery Gentry's fifth album, which was released in 2006 under the production of Rutherford and Wright. Its title track, co-written by Neil Thrasher, Jason Sellers, and Michael Dulaney, was previously recorded by Kenny Chesney on his 2004 album When the Sun Goes Down. Gentry told the Edmonton Sun that Some People Change "is based more on family issues, the love of the family, the love of neighbors, relationships", and said that the title track "is about being able to challenge your inner demons and the things that can bring people down, alcoholism, or hatred or racism." Montgomery Gentry's version of the song peaked at number 7, followed by the two-week No. 1 hit "Lucky Man" and the number 3 "What Do Ya Think About That". In 2008, "Lucky Man" was nominated for the Grammy Award for Best Country Performance by a Duo or Group with Vocal, the duo's first Grammy nomination.

Some People Change was Montgomery Gentry's lowest-selling album at the time. Joe Galante, then-president of Sony Music Nashville, thought that the album's poor sales were because it "strayed musically from what the base had been. They have an edge to their sound, and I think we got a little too soft." Kelefa Sanneh of The New York Times gave a mixed review, saying that it was more "touchy-feely" than You Do Your Thing, and that "no one works a snarling country chorus like Montgomery Gentry". Chris Willman of Entertainment Weekly gave the album a "C", criticizing the duo for the contradictory viewpoints of personal changes on the title track versus the "defense of the American right to piss off your neighbors" in "What Do Ya Think About That". Jurek comparatively called it a "masterpiece" and said that it was "a new pinnacle for the duo", calling the title track "one of those tunes that defines something that lies at the heart of what is good about Americans."

=== 2008–2009: Back When I Knew It All ===
In 2008, the duo went to Ardent Studios in Memphis, Tennessee to record their sixth album, Back When I Knew It All. Again, they worked with Blake Chancey as producer. This album's title track, co-written by Trent Willmon, was the duo's fastest-climbing single. Both it and followup "Roll with Me", which included a backing vocal from Five for Fighting, went to No. 1. "One in Every Crowd", co-written by Montgomery with Kim Tribble and former Trick Pony bassist Ira Dean, was issued in January 2009 as the third single. By the middle of the year, this song peaked at No. 5. The fourth single, the number 23 "Long Line of Losers", was co-written and previously recorded by Kevin Fowler. Toby Keith, with whom Montgomery Gentry toured in mid-2008, contributed a guest vocal on the Terri Clark co-write "I Pick My Parties", and Lillie Mae Rische of Jypsi made an appearance on "God Knows Who I Am". Thom Jurek wrote of this album, "The hardcore fans will love it, but this isn't the album that will win over many new ones."

On May 26, 2009, Montgomery Gentry was formally invited by Charlie Daniels to become members of the Grand Ole Opry. Marty Stuart and Little Jimmy Dickens inducted them on June 23. Also in May 2009, Cracker Barrel restaurants released an exclusive compilation titled For Our Heroes, which included some of their hits along with "Didn't I" and three other songs which had previously been released only as bonus tracks. The restaurant chain donated a portion of all profits from the album to the Wounded Warrior Project.

=== 2009–2011: Freedom and Hits And More: Life Beside A Gravel Road ===
On November 30, 2009, Montgomery Gentry released the single "Oughta Be More Songs About That". It was to have been included on an album titled Freedom, which was to have included a song that the two wrote with Gary Hannan and Phil O'Donnell titled "Freedom Never Goes Out of Style". The label scrapped Freedom and instead chose to release an extended play titled Hits and More: Life Beside a Gravel Road, which would have included past hits and three new songs. Its first single, "While You're Still Young", peaked at number 32 in mid-2010. On September 17, 2010, a day before the extended play's slated release, Montgomery Gentry exited the label, and Hits and More was shelved. Both members told Country Weekly that they decided to leave Columbia because "there were so many people trying to encourage us to do something a little different musically. Some of it worked and some of it didn't."

=== 2011–2012: Rebels On The Run and Friends and Family ===
Montgomery Gentry signed to Average Joes Entertainment, a label co-owned by country rap artist Colt Ford, in March 2011. Their first release for the label, "Where I Come From", appears on their seventh album Rebels on the Run, released on October 18. The album was produced by Michael Knox, who also produces for Jason Aldean. Jurek thought that the album was "the most consistent offering" since Some People Change "even if it doesn't quite scale those heights", and Country Weekly reviewer Jessica Nicholson called it "classic Montgomery Gentry". In early 2012, "Where I Come From" peaked at No. 8 on the country charts. Next was "So Called Life", which failed to make Top 40.

On October 23, 2012, the duo released a digital-only EP titled Friends and Family. The EP contains four tracks, including "I'll Keep the Kids", which was released as a single.

=== 2013–2015: Folks Like Us ===
The duo spent most of 2012 and 2013 touring. They signed to Blaster Records in February 2014 and announced that an album, to be produced by Michael Knox, would be released within the year. However, the album's lead single, titled "Headlights", did not perform as expected on the charts, peaking at No. 44 on Country Airplay. As a result, the album's release was delayed. The album's second single "Folks Like Us", was released to country radio in March 2015. Folks Like Us was released on June 9, 2015.

=== 2016–present: Gentry's death, Here's to You, 20 Years of Hits, Outskirts and Montgomery's first solo studio album ===
In November 2016, the duo left Blaster Records and re-signed with Average Joes Entertainment. They began working on an album, then slated for a 2017 release. After Gentry's death on September 8, 2017, the label announced that the duo had completed their new album prior to the fatal helicopter crash. "Better Me", the lead single, was released on September 15, 2017. In November 2017, the album's title Here's to You was announced, as was its release date of February 2, 2018. Montgomery has confirmed that he will continue the Montgomery Gentry name as a solo act due to Gentry's death and toured in 2018 in support of the new album. On November 16, Average Joes issued the new compilation 20 Years of Hits, which includes new re-recordings of the duo's biggest hits that were completed before Gentry's death. That was followed in 2019 by the studio album Outskirts, a seven-song compilation recorded a week prior to Gentry's death. Produced by Noah Gordon and Shannon Houchins, the album includes a cover of Merle Haggard's 1983 hit "What Am I Gonna Do (With the Rest of My Life)" and Darrell Scott's "You'll Never Leave Harlan Alive". Later in 2019, the label released a deluxe version with additional songs. At the time of the album's release, Montgomery said that he planned to continue touring under the Montgomery Gentry name even after Gentry's death, and that he wanted to honor Gentry by releasing songs that they had worked on prior.

On October 29, 2021, Montgomery released his first studio album as a solo artist titled Ain't No Closing Me Down via Average Joes Entertainment. The album features two singles "Alive And Well" and "My Son". While maintaining his solo career, Montgomery has also continued to tour with the backing band under the Montgomery Gentry name.

== Musical styles ==
Montgomery Gentry's sound was defined by Southern rock influences. Steve Huey of Allmusic wrote that the duo "evokes the sound and spirit of Southern rockers like Lynyrd Skynyrd, the Marshall Tucker Band, and Charlie Daniels, painting themselves as rowdy redneck rebels who still hold small-town values." They cite Daniels, Lynyrd Skynyrd and Hank Williams, Jr. as primary musical influences. Montgomery and Gentry alternated as lead vocalists, with Gentry often accompanying on acoustic guitar. Jurek wrote that "Montgomery's rough hewn baritone and Gentry's almost unreal range and trademark phrasing make something highly original". In his book Country, Richard Carlin said Montgomery Gentry as "rock[s] harder than Brooks & Dunn, although their music could be seen as an extension of that successful pair's boot-scootin' sound." He also wrote that Gentry sings with a "sweet, high tenor" while Montgomery "complements with an earthy, sometimes raspy, baritone", and notes that the duo has an "energetic stage show and dress".

Many of the duo's mid-tempo songs like "My Town", centralized on a theme of rural lifestyles. Others, such as "You Do Your Thing" and "Some People Change", contained messages of tolerance towards others with differing opinions.

== Personal lives ==
=== Eddie Montgomery ===
Gerald Edward "Eddie" Montgomery was born in Danville, Kentucky, on September 30, 1963, to parents Carol Dean (née Lay) and Harold Edward Montgomery (1941–1994). In November 2010, Eddie Montgomery told Great American Country that he had been diagnosed with prostate cancer. The cancer was successfully removed a month later. Also in December 2010, his wife, Tracy Nunan Montgomery, announced their divorce, serving him papers at Eddie Montgomery's Steakhouse, a restaurant he owned in Harrodsburg, Kentucky. The restaurant closed abruptly in Spring 2013. The couple had five children and had been married for over 20 years. Montgomery posted to Twitter and Facebook that she divorced him because she did not want to "cope with his illness," but she subsequently denied it. Montgomery married his longtime girlfriend, Jennifer Belcher, in 2014. On September 27, 2015, Montgomery wrote that his and ex-wife Tracy Nunan's 19-year-old son, Hunter, had been killed in an accident. Nunan subsequently clarified that Hunter died of an overdose, which she believed was accidental.

=== Troy Gentry ===
Troy Gentry was born on April 5, 1967, in Lexington, Kentucky, to Patricia and Lloyd Gentry. He had a brother, Keith Gentry, and a sister, Jana Gentry Eckhardt. He graduated from Lexington Community College and attended the University of Kentucky in the city. Gentry married Angie McClure in 1999. They had a child, Kaylee, who was born in November 2002. He also had a child, Taylor, from a previous marriage.

==== Charity work ====
Troy Gentry's charitable efforts were deeply rooted in his personal beliefs and values. His foundation, the Troy Gentry Foundation, was established to continue his legacy of love and support for various causes. The foundation focuses on financial support for organizations that aid in cancer research, assist military families, and provide music education to future generations. The inaugural Troy Gentry Foundation concert, "C'Ya on the Flipside," raised over $300,000 for charity, benefiting local charities such as the Opry Trust Fund, T.J. Martell, Make-a-Wish, and scholarships for music education in Kentucky schools. This event was a heartfelt tribute to Troy Gentry's memory and a testament to the impact he had on those in need. See the https://www.thetroygentryfoundation.org/

In 2004, Gentry purchased a black bear named "Cubby" from a facility called the Minnesota Wildlife Connection and subsequently shot the bear from inside an electrified enclosure, a practice commonly known as canned hunting. On November 27, 2006, Gentry pleaded guilty to a charge of falsely tagging a bear that was killed in a fenced enclosure as if it had been killed in the wild. Under the plea agreement, he agreed to pay a $15,000 fine; give up hunting, fishing, and trapping in Minnesota for five years; and forfeit Cubby's taxidermied remains and the bow he used to shoot Cubby. In a statement that he posted on the duo's website on November 9, 2010, he apologized for his actions as well as the unethical manner in which he killed Cubby.

On September 8, 2017, Gentry died in a helicopter crash while taking a helicopter tour of Medford, New Jersey where he and Montgomery were set to perform that evening. Through social media, the band released the following statement: "It is with great sadness that we confirm that Troy Gentry, half of the popular country duo, Montgomery Gentry, was tragically killed in a helicopter crash which took place at approximately 1:00 p.m. today in Medford, New Jersey." On September 14, 2017, a public memorial service for Gentry was held at the Grand Ole Opry in Nashville. On November 5, 2018, the final National Transportation Safety Board report was issued, with the accident being primarily attributed to the pilot's "failure to maintain rotor rpm... which resulted in an uncontrolled descent."

== Awards ==
Year	Association	Category	Result
1999	Country Music Association	Vocal Duo of the Year	Nominated
2000	American Music Awards	Favorite New Artist – Country	Won
2000	Academy of Country Music	Top Vocal Duo	Nominated
2000	Academy of Country Music	Top New Vocal Duo or Group	Won
2000	Country Music Association	Vocal Duo of the Year	Won
2001	Academy of Country Music	Top Vocal Duo	Nominated
2001	Country Music Association	Vocal Duo of the Year	Nominated
2002	Academy of Country Music	Top Vocal Duo	Nominated
2002	Country Music Association	Vocal Duo of the Year	Nominated
2003	Academy of Country Music	Top Vocal Duo	Nominated
2003	Country Music Association	Vocal Duo of the Year	Nominated
2003	Country Music Association	Vocal Event of the Year – "The Truth About Men" (with Tracy Byrd, Andy Griggs, and Blake Shelton)	Nominated
2004	Academy of Country Music	Top Vocal Duo	Nominated
2004	Country Music Association	Vocal Duo of the Year	Nominated
2005	Academy of Country Music	Top Vocal Duo	Nominated
2005	Country Music Association	Vocal Duo of the Year	Nominated
2006	Academy of Country Music	Top Vocal Duo	Nominated
2006	Country Music Association	Vocal Duo of the Year	Nominated
2007	Academy of Country Music	Top Vocal Duo	Nominated
2007	Country Music Association	Vocal Duo of the Year	Nominated
2008	Grammy Awards	Best Country Vocal Performance by a Duo or Group – "Lucky Man"	Nominated
2008	Academy of Country Music	Top Vocal Duo	Nominated
2008	Country Music Association	Vocal Duo of the Year	Nominated
2009	Academy of Country Music	Album of the Year – Back When I Knew It All	Nominated
2009	Academy of Country Music	Top Vocal Duo	Nominated
2009	Country Music Association	Vocal Duo of the Year	Nominated

== Discography ==
Studio albums

- Tattoos & Scars (1999)
- Carrying On (2001)
- My Town (2002)
- You Do Your Thing (2004)
- Some People Change (2006)
- Back When I Knew It All (2008)
- Rebels on the Run (2011)
- Folks Like Us (2015)
- Here's to You (2018)
- Outskirts (2019)

Eddie Montgomery

- Ain't No Closing Me Down (2021)
