= Blacked Out =

Studio album by Moonshine Bandits
- Released: July 17, 2015
- Recorded: 2014
- Genre: Country rap
- Length: 55:35
- Label: Average Joes Entertainment

Moonshine Bandits chronology
Calicountry (2014)	Blacked Out (2015)	Baptized in Bourbon (2017)

Professional ratings
Review scores
Source	Rating
AllMusic	3.5/5 stars

Blacked Out is a studio album by American country rap duo Moonshine Bandits from California. It was released on July 17, 2015 via Average Joes Entertainment. It features guest appearances from Bubba Sparxxx, Colt Ford, Crucifix, Demun Jones, Durwood Black, D. Thrash of Jawga Boyz, Jeff McCool, Lenny Cooper, Redneck Souljers, Sarah Ross and The Lacs. The album peaked at number 158 on the Billboard 200 in the United States.

== Track listing ==
No.	Title	Length
1.	"Deadman's Hand"	3:19
2.	"Lasso" (featuring Durwood Black)	3:00
3.	"She's Crazy"	3:10
4.	"Top Off the Tank"	3:32
5.	"Lady Luck" (featuring Crucifix)	3:48
6.	"Come on Down"	3:17
7.	"I Earned It"	3:21
8.	"Blacked Out" (featuring Durwood Black)	3:22
9.	"Good Times"	3:07
10.	"American Banned"	3:10
11.	"Pass the Ammo"	3:31
12.	"Outback" (featuring The Lacs)	3:35
13.	"Step" (featuring Sarah Ross)	3:21
14.	"Full Throttle (Remix)" (featuring Colt Ford)	3:53
15.	"Outback (Extended)" (featuring Durwood Black, The Lacs, D. Thrash, Redneck Souljers, Bubba Sparxxx, Jeff McCool, Lenny Cooper and Demun Jones)	8:09
Total length:		55:35

== Charts ==
Chart (2015)	Peak position
US Billboard 200	158
US Top Country Albums (Billboard)	13
US Top Rap Albums (Billboard)	10
US Heatseekers Albums (Billboard)	3
US Independent Albums (Billboard)	13
