= Harter =

Harter may refer to:

- Harter (surname)
- Harter Township, Clay County, Illinois, township in Illinois, United States
- Harter, West Virginia, unincorporated community in West Virginia, United States
- Harter Fell (disambiguation)
- Harter Nunatak, nunatak of Antarctica
