= Baptized in Bourbon =

Studio album by Moonshine Bandits
- Released: March 3, 2017
- Genre: Country rap
- Length: 55:42
- Label: Average Joes Entertainment

Moonshine Bandits chronology
Blacked Out (2015)	Baptized in Bourbon (2017)	Gold Rush (2018)

Professional ratings
Review scores
Source	Rating
RapReviews	6.5/10

Baptized in Bourbon is the seventh studio album by American country rap duo Moonshine Bandits from California. It was released on March 3, 2017 via Average Joes Entertainment. It features guest appearances from Bubba Sparxxx, Colt Ford, Crucifix, David Allan Coe, Demun Jones, Durwood Black, JellyRoll, Matt Borden, Outlaw, The Lacs and Uncle Kracker. The album peaked at number 111 on the Billboard 200 in the United States.

== Track listing ==
No.	Title	Length
1.	"The Sermon" (Intro)	2:06
2.	"I'm a HellRazor" (featuring Crucifix)	3:13
3.	"Red, White & Blue Collar"	2:57
4.	"Stomp Like Hell"	3:22
5.	"51FIFTY" (featuring Bubba Sparxxx)	3:58
6.	"Ain't Hearin' Nothin'"	3:14
7.	"Cards I Was Dealt" (featuring The Lacs)	4:20
8.	"Renegade Rides Again"	3:26
9.	"Hell on Heels"	4:13
10.	"Baptized in Bourbon" (featuring Uncle Kracker)	4:06
11.	"Dad's Pontoon" (featuring Colt Ford & Outlaw)	3:43
12.	"Shook It Up" (featuring Matt Borden)	3:19
13.	"I Don't Wanna Go Home" (featuring Durwood Black)	3:49
14.	"Take This Job" (featuring David Allan Coe)	3:17
15.	"Wild Ones" (featuring Jelly Roll)	2:35
16.	"Raised Up" (featuring Demun Jones)	4:04
Total length:		55:42

== Charts ==
Chart (2017)	Peak position
US Billboard 200	111
US Top Country Albums (Billboard)	19
US Heatseekers Albums (Billboard)	1
US Independent Albums (Billboard)	9
