= Moonshine Bandits =

American country rap duo

- Origin: Los Banos, California, United States
- Genres: Country rap; rap rock
- Years active: 2003–present
- Labels: Suburban Noize; AVJ; MSB Entertainment
- Members: Dusty "Tex" Dahlgren; Brett "Bird" Brooks
- Website: moonshinebandits.com

Moonshine Bandits is an American country rap duo composed of Dusty "Tex" Dahlgren and Brett "Bird" Brooks. The duo formed in Los Banos, California in 2003 and has released a number of albums, the most recent being The Whiskey Never Dries released in August 2019.

== Music career ==
The duo was formed in Los Banos, California in 2003 and released their debut album, Soggy Crackerz. They met up with Ty Weathers who is the founder of Burn County Music, which has continued to work closely in assisting majority of the Moonshine Bandits Blue Core/Dirt Rock sound. Soggy Crackerz was followed by Prohibition in 2006 and Divebars and Truckstops in 2010.

Moonshine Bandits signed with Suburban Noize Records for the release of their fourth album, Whiskey and Women, in 2011. The music video for "My Kind of Country" premiered on CMT Pure Country in February 2012 with a special appearance by Mike Allsup (The Bearded Guy playing the guitar) from Modesto, California.

In 2014, they partnered with Average Joes Entertainment for their fifth album Calicountry. Calicountry sold 3,000 copies in its first week of release, debuting at number 22 on the Billboard Top Country Albums chart and number 126 on the Billboard 200.

Their sixth album, Blacked Out, was released in July 2015, and it debuted at No.158 on the Billboard 200 and No. 13 on the Top Country Albums chart, No. 10 on the Top Rap Albums chart, selling 4,000 copies in its debut week.

== Discography ==
=== Albums ===
Title	Album details	Peak chart positions					Sales
Title	Album details	US	US Heat.	US Indie	US Rap	US Country	Sales
Soggy Crackerz	Release date: October 21, 2003; Label: JLM Entertainment	—	—	—	—	—	
Prohibition	Release date: June 27, 2006; Label: IMN Records	—	—	—	—	—	
Divebars and Truckstops	Release date: February 2, 2010; Label: MSB Entertainment	—	—	—	—	—	
Whiskey and Women	Release date: May 10, 2011; Label: Suburban Noize Records	—	—	—	—	65	
Calicountry	Release date: February 4, 2014; Label: Backroad Records, Suburban Noize Records	126	2	27	10	22	
Blacked Out	Release date: July 17, 2015; Label: Backroad Records	161	3	13	10	13	
Baptized in Bourbon	Release date: March 3, 2017; Label: Backroad Records	111	1	9	—	19	US: 5,600
Gold Rush	Release date: October 5, 2018; Label: MSB Entertainment	—	6	24	—	—	US: 1,700
Fire	Release date: September 18, 2020; Label: MSB Entertainment	—	—	—	—	—	
Pour Decisions	Release date: July 14, 2023; Label: MSB Entertainment	—	—	—	—	—	

=== Extended plays ===
Title	Album details	Peak chart positions	
Title	Album details	US Heat.	US Country
Rebels on the Run	Release date: September 30, 2014; Label: Backroad Records	35	49
The Whiskey Never Dries	Release date: August 2, 2019; Label: MSB Entertainment	10	29

=== Singles ===
Year	Single	Album
2014	"Throwdown" (with The Lacs)	Calicountry
2015	"Outback" (with The Lacs & Durwood Black)	Blacked Out
2017	"Take This Job" (with David Allan Coe)	Baptized in Bourbon
2023	"Wild" (with Buckcherry)	Pour Decisions

=== Music videos ===
Year	Video	Director	Producer
2011	"Get Loose"		Burn County
2011	"For the Outlawz" (with Colt Ford and Big B)		Burn County
2012	"My Kind of Country"	Scott Hansen	Burn County
2012	"Super Goggles"	Paul Cain	Burn County
2012	"Dive Bar Beauty Queen"	Scott Hansen	Burn County
2014	"California Country"	Scott Hansen	Phivestarr
2014	"Throwdown" (with The Lacs)	Scott Hansen	Burn County
2014	"We All Country" (with Colt Ford, Sarah Ross and Demun Jones)	Daniel Henry	
2015	"Outback (Extended Remix)" (with Durwood Black, Redneck Souljers, Bubba Sparxxx, Demun Jones, The Lacs, D. Thrash, Moccasin Creek and Lenny Cooper)	Ed Pryor	Burn County
2016	"Dead Man's Hand"	Ken Madson	Burn County
2017	"Take This Job" (with David Allan Coe)	Ken Madson	
2017	"I'm A HellRazor"	Ken Madson	Burn County
2018	"Buried As An Outlaw"		
2018	"Rebel Red Hot"		Burn County
2019	"Do It Again"	Josh Fields	Phivestarr
2020	"Red, White and Boozed"	Josh Fields	Phivestarr
2020	"I'm On Fire"	@Kreatewithkvnvas	Burn County
2020	"Watchya Got"	Josh Fields	
2021	"Live the Madness"	Josh Fields	Burn County
2021	"American Summer"	Josh Fields	Burn County
2022	"Like 'Em Wild"	Josh Fields	Brad Cox/Burn County
2023	"I'm a Rebel"	Josh Fields	Burn County
2023	"I'm a Problem"	Josh Fields	Brad Cox/Burn County
2023	"Wild"	Josh Fields	Brad Cox/Burn County
2023	"Outta Towners"	Hatch 86 Films	Brad Cox/Burn County
2023	"Chasing Ghosts"	Hatch 86 Films	Brad Cox/Burn County
2024	"Party Cove"	Josh Fields	Phivestarr
2024	"Boots on Bars"	Hatch 86 Films	Brad Cox/Burn County
