= Keep It Redneck =

Studio album by The Lacs
- Released: August 20, 2013
- Genre: Country rap
- Length: 57:51
- Label: Average Joes Entertainment
- Producer: Shannon "Fat Shan" Houchins (also exec.); Phivestarr Productions (exec.)

The Lacs chronology
190 Proof (2012)	Keep It Redneck (2013)	Nothing in Particular (2014)

Professional ratings
Review scores
Source	Rating
AllMusic	3.5/5 stars

Keep It Redneck is a studio album by American country rap group The Lacs. It was released on August 20, 2013 via Average Joes Entertainment. It features guest appearances from Colt Ford, JJ Lawhorn, Noah Gordon and Sarah Ross. The album peaked at number 23 on the Billboard 200 albums chart in the United States.

== Track listing ==
No.	Title	Writer(s)	Length
1.	"Keep It Redneck"	Brian "Rooster" King; Clay "Uncle Snap" Sharpe; Jared Sciullo; Justin Spillner; Joseph Benson; DJ KO	3:55
2.	"Kick Dust" (featuring Noah Gordon)	King; Sharpe; Noah Gordon; Mike Hartnett; Shannon Houchins	3:52
3.	"Great Moments In Redneck History #3" (Skit)		1:14
4.	"Shichya"	King; Sharpe; Sciullo; Spillner; DJ KO	3:36
5.	"Make Things Right"	King; Sharpe; Sciullo; Spillner; DJ KO	3:48
6.	"Smoke Stack"	King; Sharpe; Sciullo; Spillner; DJ KO	3:45
7.	"Rusty's Junk Shack" (Skit)		3:02
8.	"Empties"	King; Sharpe; Gordon; Hartnett; Houchins	3:07
9.	"Get Lost"	King; Sharpe; Sciullo; Spillner; DJ KO	3:45
10.	"All Weekend Long"	King; Sharpe; Sciullo; Spillner; DJ KO	4:01
11.	"Relacs" (featuring Sarah Ross)	King; Sharpe; Sarah Ross; Niko Prange; Sciullo; Spillner; DJ KO	3:57
12.	"She's Runnin'"	King; Sharpe; Sciullo; Spillner; DJ KO	4:07
13.	"Memory"	King; Sharpe; Sciullo; Spillner; DJ KO	3:45
14.	"Tylenol"	King; Sharpe; Sciullo; Spillner; DJ KO	3:46
15.	"Field Party (Remix)" (featuring Colt Ford and JJ Lawhorn)	King; Sharpe; Jason Brown; Jonathan Lawhorn; Sciullo; Spillner; DJ KO	4:35
16.	"Kickin Up Mud"	King; Sharpe; Prange; Sciullo; Spillner; DJ KO	3:36
Total length:			57:51

== Charts ==
Chart (2013)	Peak position
US Billboard 200	23
US Independent Albums (Billboard)	7
US Top Rap Albums (Billboard)	5
US Top Country Albums (Billboard)	3
