= Ed Pryor =

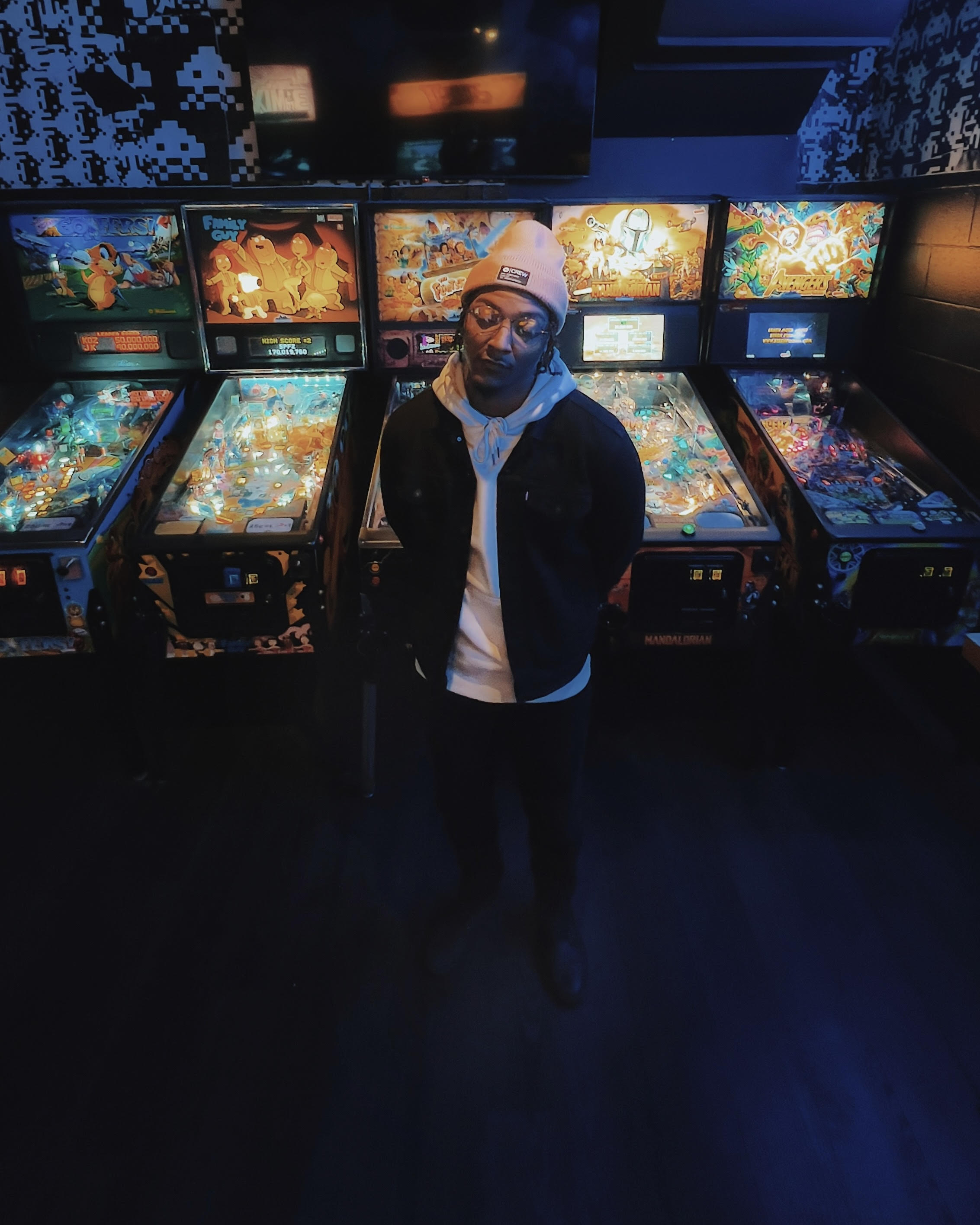

Background information
- Born: September 1989 (age 36)
- Origin: Winchester, Tennessee, United States
- Genres: rap; hip hop; R&B; country; pop; electronic
- Occupations: Music video director; director; record producer; songwriter; audio engineer
- Instruments: sampler, synthesizer, piano, percussion
- Years active: 2007-present
- Website: edpryor.com.

Ed Pryor (born September 7, 1989) is an American music video director and record producer.

== Early life ==
At an early age he experimented with a growing interest in music production and film - influenced by his father, whom had worked as a DJ. Raised in Winchester, Tennessee, a small town in southern middle Tennessee. Pryor graduation from Franklin County High School before attending and graduating from Middle Tennessee State University later moving to Nashville, Tennessee, to pursue a career in the music industry.

== Career ==
=== Director ===
The award-nominated director has developed a client list that includes Snoop Dogg, Luke Bryan, Kevin Gates, and Mickey Guyton. He was nominated for Group/Duo Video of the Year at the 2023 CMT Awards for "That's How Love Is Made" by The War and Treaty and Music Video of the Year at the 2021 CMA, CMT, and ACM awards for co-directing "Gone (Dierks Bentley song) with Wes Edwards. His work has been featured on television programs such as The Late Show with Stephen Colbert, Today (American TV program), The Kelly Clarkson Show, and publications such as Billboard (magazine), People (magazine), Rolling Stone.

In 2021, Pryor founded Daydark, a multimedia production company based in Nashville, Tennessee, through which he has executive produced music videos and content for artists including Tyler Hubbard, Vince Gill and 49 Winchester.

He also served as creative director with Taillight Pictures, helping launch CRWNZ, a Swisher Sweets brand — filming commercial advertisements and overseeing key photography, and leading the effort to bring on Conway the Machine as brand ambassador for the campaign.

=== Music production ===
Pryor has produced songs featuring artists such as JellyRoll, Project Pat and Cherub (musical duo).

His production is featured on many albums spanning several genres — rap album's such as Lil Wyte and JellyRoll's (2013) No Filter, to Average Joes Entertainment's country compilation series (2014) Mud Digger 5. Many of these albums have appeared in the Billboard 200 and various other charts.

Pryor is also frequent collaborator with the country rap duo Redneck Souljers and has produced all four of their albums in entirety. 2015's Firewater, debuted at No. 8 on Billboard's Heatseeker's Chart, #19 on Billboard's Rap Albums Chart, #37 on Billboard's Independent Chart, and #42 on Billboard's Top Country Albums Chart.

== Music Videos ==
=== Director ===
Year	Artist	Video
2026	Josh Tatofi	Looking For Love
2026	Atlus	Spare Key
2025	Starlito and Don Trip (Stepbrothers)	Mitchell and Ness
2025	Bryan Martin (singer) and Colt Ford (feat. Yelawolf)	Shades
2025	Tim Gent	MLB
2024	Cassadee Pope (feat. Daisha McBride)	"I Died"
2023	Dierks Bentley	"Same Ol' Me"
2023	Mickey Guyton	"How You Love Someone"
2023	The War and Treaty	"Dumb Luck"
2023	Cassadee Pope	"People That I Love Leave"
2023	Cassadee Pope	"Almost There"
2023	Brittney Spencer	"Bigger Than The Song"
2023	Chase Matthew	"The Way I Am"
2023	SHERIE (feat. D Smoke)	"Candlelight"
2022	Justin Champagne (feat. Snoop Dogg)	"If She Ain't Country" Remix"
2022	Mickey Guyton	"I Still Pray"
2022	The War and Treaty	"That's How Love Is Made"
2022	The War and Treaty	"Blank Page"
2022	Chase Matthew	"She's Loves Jesus"
2022	Chase Matthew	"Everything He Couldn't"
2022	Chase Matthew	"We Had It Good"
2022	C-Murder	"Dear YoungBoy Never Going Broke"
2022	Mokita (feat. Charlotte Sands)	"Crash"
2022	Caitlynn Curtis	"Mood Swings"
2021	Colt Ford (feat. Kevin Gates and Jermaine Dupri)	"Hood"
2021	Cassadee Pope (feat. Karen Fairchild of Little Big Town and Lindsay Ell)	"What the Stars See"
2021	Cassadee Pope	"Say It First"
2021	Montgomery Gentry	"Alive and Well"
2021	Killah Calico (feat. Bryant Taylorr)	"Said What I Said"
2021	Sam Grow	"You Ain't Gone"
2021	Hubb Walls (Redneck Souljers)	"Heathen"
2020	Dierks Bentley	"Gone" (co-directed with Wes Edwards)
2020	Parmalee + Blanco Brown	"Just the Way"
2020	FU Stan	"Numb"
2020	Rittz	"Politically Correct"
2019	Rittz	"Twin Lakes"
2019	Colt Ford (feat. Mitchell Tenpenny)	"Slow Ride"
2019	Colt Ford	"We The People"
2019	Sam Grow	"Drink About That"
2019	Colt Ford (starring Ben Higgins of The Bachelor (American TV series))	"How to Lose a Woman"
2019	Montgomery Gentry	"King of the World" (co-directed with Grant Claire)
2019	Big Smo	"Boss 2.0"
2018	Muscadine Bloodline	"Enemy"
2018	Muscadine Bloodline	"Girl from Mississippi"
2018	Montgomery Gentry	"Get Down South"
2018	Sister Hazel	"You Won't See Me Again"
2018	Yonas (hip hop artist)	"All Rise"
2017	Colt Ford (feat. Waterloo Revival)	"Dynamite"
2017	Colt Ford (feat. Taylor Ray Holbrook)	"Reload"
2017	Lizzie Sider	"Silent Night"
2017	2 Live Bre	"Lyft"
2017	Todd O'Neill	"Love Again"
2017	Rioville	"The Feel Good"
2017	Bingx (feat. Stevie Stone)	"Back To You"
2016	Colt Ford	"4 Lane Gone"
2016	Sister Hazel	"That Kind of Beautiful"
2016	Redneck Souljers	"Ain't Gonna Hurt You"
2016	Bingx	"Day Away"
2015	Redneck Souljers	"Firewater"
2015	Morgan Myles	"Whiskey Dreaming"
2015	Outlaw	"Backwoods Badass"
2014	Justin Forrest	"City Life"
2014	Frayser Boy	"I Don't Know"

=== Producer ===
Year	Artist	Video
2026	Luke Bryan	"Fish Hunt Golf Drink"
2026	Luke Bryan	"Country And She Knows It"
2026	49 Winchester	"Pardon Me"
2026	Kassi Ashton	"Bitches"
2026	Blake Proehl	"She Got It"
2026	Dalton Davis	"Blue"
2024	Dalton Dover	"Bury Me In This Bar"

== Television ==
Year	TV Show	Episode		Role
2022	The Late Show with Stephen Colbert	S7	Brittney Spencer - "Sober and Skinny"	Segment Director
2021	The Kelly Clarkson Show	S3 E0	Parmalee - "Take My Name"	Segment Director

== Movies ==
Year	Movie	Role
2021	Old Henry	Credit Sequence Editor
2021	Howard's Mill	Second Unit Director

== Awards and nominations ==
Year	Video	Artist	Category	Result
2024	"Bigger Than The Song"	Brittney Spencer	CMT Music Awards Breakthrough Female Video of the Year	Nominated
2023	"That's How Love Is Made"	The War and Treaty	CMT Music Awards Group/Duo Video of the Year	Nominated
2021	"Just the Way"	Parmalee + Blanco Brown	CMT Music Awards Group/Duo Video of the Year	Nominated
2021	"Gone"	Dierks Bentley	CMA Music Video of the Year	Nominated
2021	"Gone"	Dierks Bentley	CMT Music Video of the Year	Nominated
2021	"Gone"	Dierks Bentley	ACM Music Video of the Year	Nominated
