= 190 Proof =

Studio album by The Lacs
- Released: April 3, 2012
- Studio: Phive Starr Stuidios (Atlanta, GA)
- Genre: Country rap
- Length: 45:16
- Label: Average Joes Entertainment
- Producer: Shannon Houchins (also exec.); Phivestarr Productions (also exec.)

The Lacs chronology
Country Boy's Paradise (2011)	190 Proof (2012)	Keep It Redneck (2013)

Professional ratings
Review scores
Source	Rating
AllMusic	3.5/5 stars

190 Proof is a studio album by American country rap group The Lacs. It was released on April 3, 2012 via Average Joes Entertainment. Recording session took place at Phive Starr Stuidios in Atlanta. Production was handled by Shannon Houchins and Phivestarr Productions. It features guest appearances from Bubba Sparxxx and Crucifix. The album peaked at number 68 on the Billboard 200 albums chart in the United States.

== Track listing ==
No.	Title	Writer(s)	Length
1.	"190 Proof"	Brian "Rooster" King; Clay "Uncle Snap" Sharpe; Jared Sciullo; Justin Spillner; DJ KO	2:52
2.	"Drinks Up"	King; Sharpe; Sciullo; Spillner; DJ KO	4:01
3.	"Po Dunk University" (Skit)		2:00
4.	"Shake It"	King; Sharpe; William Alphin; Keith Richardson; Sciullo; Spillner; DJ KO	3:21
5.	"Old River Road"	King; Sharpe; Sciullo; Spillner; DJ KO	3:21
6.	"Wylin" (featuring Bubba Sparxxx)	King; Sharpe; Warren Mathis; Sciullo; Spillner; DJ KO	3:56
7.	"Great Moments in Redneck History #2" (Skit)		1:14
8.	"Country Boy Fresh"	King; Sharpe; Sciullo; Spillner; DJ KO	3:41
9.	"Island Time"	King; Sharpe; Chase Bean; Sciullo; Spillner; DJ KO	3:38
10.	"Just Another Thing" (featuring Crucifix)	King; Sharpe; Cameron Russell; Sciullo; Spillner; DJ KO	3:37
11.	"4 Wheel Drive"	King; Sharpe; Richardson; Sciullo; Spillner; DJ KO	3:21
12.	"Drink Too Much"	King; Sharpe; Sciullo; Spillner; DJ KO	3:25
13.	"Ease Along"	King; Sharpe; Sciullo; Spillner; DJ KO	3:01
14.	"What I Need"	King; Sharpe; Sciullo; Spillner; DJ KO	3:48
Total length:			45:16

== Charts ==
Chart (2012)	Peak position
US Billboard 200	68
US Independent Albums (Billboard)	9
US Top Rap Albums (Billboard)	8
US Top Country Albums (Billboard)	16
