= Calicountry =

Studio album by Moonshine Bandits
- Released: February 4, 2014
- Recorded: 2013
- Genre: Country rap
- Length: 52:35
- Labels: Average Joes Entertainment, Suburban Noize Records
- Producers: Colt Ford (exec.); Shannon Houchins (exec.)

Moonshine Bandits chronology
Whiskey and Women (2011)	Calicountry (2014)	Blacked Out (2015)

Professional ratings
Review scores
Source	Rating
AllMusic	3.5/5 stars
RapReviews	6/10

Calicountry is the fifth studio album by American country rap duo Moonshine Bandits from California. It was released on February 4, 2014 via Average Joes Entertainment and Suburban Noize Records. It features guest appearances from Big B, Charlie Farley, Colt Ford, Danny "Boone" Alexander, Durwood Black, Jeremy Penick, Sarah Ross and The Lacs. The album peaked at number 126 on the Billboard 200 in the United States.

== Track listing ==
No.	Title	Length
1.	"The Moon Shines" (featuring Jeremy Penick)	3:14
2.	"Throwdown" (featuring The Lacs)	4:05
3.	"Burn" (featuring Big B)	3:59
4.	"We All Country" (featuring Colt Ford, Sarah Ross and Charlie Farley)	4:22
5.	"On the Run"	3:53
6.	"Raise Some Hell"	3:11
7.	"What She Does to Me"	3:14
8.	"Feel No Pain" (featuring Danny "Boone" Alexander)	3:04
9.	"On My Way"	2:42
10.	"Much Better"	3:08
11.	"The Wrong Side of the Street" (featuring Durwood Black)	4:00
12.	"86"	3:09
13.	"California Country"	3:06
14.	"Arrest Me"	4:02
15.	"Bar Stool"	3:26
Total length:		52:35

== Charts ==
Chart (2014)	Peak position
US Billboard 200	126
US Top Country Albums (Billboard)	22
US Top Rap Albums (Billboard)	10
US Heatseekers Albums (Billboard)	2
US Independent Albums (Billboard)	27
