= Craig Campbell (singer) =

American country music singer

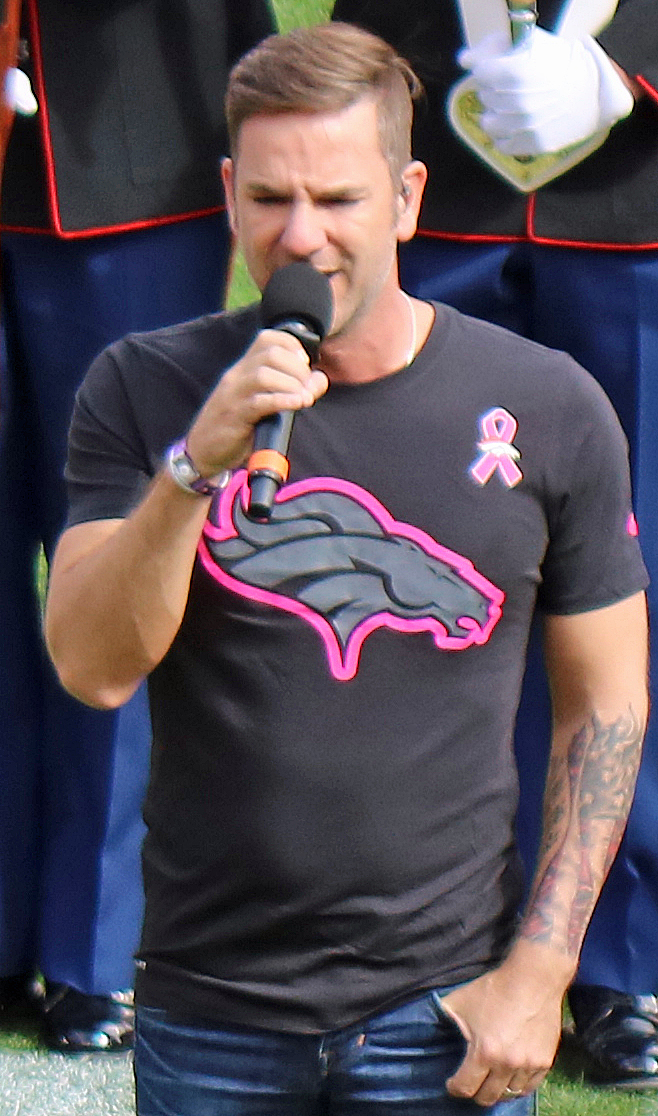
- Campbell singing "The Star-Spangled Banner" before a Denver Broncos home game against the Atlanta Falcons on October 9, 2016

Background information
- Born: February 10, 1979 (age 47)
- Origin: Lyons, Georgia, U.S.
- Genre: Country
- Instruments: Vocals; piano; guitar
- Years active: 2002–present
- Labels: BPMG; Red Bow Records; Wheelhouse Records

Craig Campbell (born February 10, 1979) is an American country music singer. He signed to Bigger Picture Music Group and has released two albums: Craig Campbell (2011) and Never Regret (2013). He has had eight singles on the country charts.

== Biography ==
=== Early years ===
Craig Campbell was born in Lyons, Georgia southeast of Macon. He grew up in a blended family with four siblings. His parents divorced when he was young, leaving his oldest sister—11 years his elder—to take care of the family while his mother worked many jobs. His mother married his stepfather when Craig was seven. He saw his biological father every other weekend until his dad died when he was 11. Craig played piano at his mother's church from age 10 to 18, forming a band called Out of the Blue as a teenager. He also won contests sponsored by True Value Hardware at 15 and at 18.

=== 2010–2014: Craig Campbell and Never Regret ===
In 2002, Craig Campbell moved to Nashville and found several musician jobs. He recorded demos and began writing songs after being persuaded by Luke Bryan. Campbell also played in Tracy Byrd's road band.

Campbell signed to Bigger Picture Music Group and released his debut single, "Family Man", on July 26, 2010. It is on an extended play titled Five Spot and on his self-titled debut album, which was released on April 5, 2011. "Family Man" reached the Top 20 of the Billboard Hot Country Songs chart with a peak of No. 14 in April 2011. The album's second single, "Fish", came out on country radio in June 2011, and reached No. 23 in October 2011. "When I Get It" peaked at No. 38 in early 2012.

Campbell released his fourth single, "Outta My Head", in late 2012. The song was included on a second extended play with the same name and appears on his second studio album, Never Regret, released on May 7, 2013. The album's second single, "Keep Them Kisses Comin'", was released to country radio on December 2, 2013, and is his biggest hit. In May 2014, it was announced that Bigger Picture would close. Campbell was the label's most commercially successful artist. Despite the label's closure, Campbell called radio stations and asked them to continue playing the song, resulting in it staying on the charts six weeks after the label's closure in addition to reaching the top 10.

=== 2014–present: See You Try EP ===
On December 1, 2014, Campbell announced that he had signed with Red Bow Records. His first single for the label, "Tomorrow Tonight", was released to country radio on May 19, 2015, and it reached a peak of No. 39 on the Billboard Country Airplay chart. Next was "Outskirts of Heaven", which was released on April 11, 2016. It went to No. 24 on the Billboard Country Airplay chart in early 2017, but no album was released. On April 9, 2018, Campbell released "See You Try," his third single under Red Bow. Both "Outskirts of Heaven" and "See You Try" are featured on his seven-song EP, See You Try, which was released on June 8, 2018. Campbell left Wheelhouse in February 2019. He released a single in 2024 titled "Stick to Our Guns".

== Discography ==
Craig Campbell discography
- Studio albums: 2
- Extended plays: 3
- Singles: 8
- Music videos: 10

=== Studio albums ===
Title	Details	Peak chart positions		
Title	Details	US Country	US	AUS
Craig Campbell	Release date: April 5, 2011; Label: Bigger Picture Music Group; Formats: CD, music download	14	65	91
Never Regret	Release date: May 7, 2013; Label: Bigger Picture Music Group; Formats: CD, music download	27	96	97

=== Extended plays ===
Title	Details
Five Spot	Release date: June 8, 2010; Label: Bigger Picture Music Group; Formats: CD, music download
Outta My Head	Release date: December 4, 2012; Label: Bigger Picture Music Group; Formats: CD, music download
See You Try	Release date: June 8, 2018; Label: Red Bow Records; Formats: CD, music download

=== Singles ===
Year	Single	Peak chart positions				Certifications	Album
Year	Single	US Country	US Country Airplay	US	CAN Country	Certifications	Album
2010	"Family Man"	14		84	46		Craig Campbell
2011	"Fish"	23		83	—	RIAA: Gold	Craig Campbell
2011	"When I Get It"	38		—	—		Craig Campbell
2012	"Outta My Head"	25	15	90	—		Never Regret
2013	"Keep Them Kisses Comin'"	15	9	72	29	RIAA: Gold	Never Regret
2015	"Tomorrow Tonight"	—	39	—	—		See You Try
2016	"Outskirts of Heaven"	32	24	—	—		See You Try
2018	"See You Try"	—	41	—	—		See You Try
2021	"Never Mine"	—	—	—	—		TBD
2025	"Missing You" (remix)	—	—	—	—		See You Try
"—" denotes releases that did not chart

=== Guest singles ===
Year	Single	Artist	Album
2016	"Back to Georgia"	The Lacs	Outlaw in Me

=== Music videos ===
Year	Video	Director
2010	"Family Man"	Shaun Silva
2011	"Fish"	Wes Edwards
2011	"Fish" (Daytime Version)	
2011	"I'll Be Home for Christmas"	Marcel
2012	"When I Get It"	Wes Edwards
2012	"Outta My Head"	Mason Dixon
2014	"Keep Them Kisses Comin'"	Shea Windley
2013	"The Sunshine Club" (with Troy Cassar-Daley)	Duncan Toombs
2015	"Tomorrow Tonight"	Chris Hicky
2016	"Back to Georgia" (with The Lacs)	Ed Pryor
2021	"Good Things Come To Those Who Drink"	Ben Boutwell

== Personal life ==
Campbell is married to his wife, Mindy. They own and operate the Grindstone Cowboy, in Eagleville, Tennessee southwest of Murfreesboro and another coffee shop with the same name in Shelbyville, Tennessee southeast of Eagleville. Craig Campbell was initiated on April 24, 2014 as an honorary initiate into the Pi Kappa Alpha Fraternity of Mu Beta Chapter at Kennesaw State University in Kennesaw, Georgia by the chapter’s charter president, Will Potts.
