= Never Regret =

Studio album by Craig Campbell
- Released: May 7, 2013
- Recorded: 2012–2013
- Genre: Country
- Length: 42:36
- Label: Bigger Picture Music Group
- Producer: Matt Rovey; Keith Stegall

Craig Campbell chronology
Craig Campbell (2011)	Never Regret (2013)

Singles from Never Regret
- 1. "Outta My Head" Released: September 17, 2012; 2. "Keep Them Kisses Comin'" Released: December 2, 2013

Professional ratings
Review scores
Source	Rating
Country Weekly	B
Roughstock	4/5 stars
Taste of Country	3/5 stars

Never Regret is the second studio album by American country music artist Craig Campbell. It was released on May 7, 2013, via Bigger Picture Music Group. "Outta My Head" was released as the first single. "Keep Them Kisses Comin'" was released as the second single.

== Track listing ==
No.	Title	Writer(s)	Length
1.	"Truck-N-Roll"	Brett Beavers, Craig Campbell, Chris Lindsey	3:41
2.	"Keep Them Kisses Comin'"	Dallas Davidson, Ben Hayslip	2:40
3.	"When She Grows Up"	Campbell, Alex Dooley, Arlos Smith	3:50
4.	"Tomorrow Is Gone"	Tommy Conners, Kevin Denney, Phillip White	3:58
5.	"Never Regret"	Campbell, Jason Matthews, Jim McCormick	3:10
6.	"My Baby's Daddy"	Brandon Kinney, Cole Swindell	3:09
7.	"Topless"	Campbell, Blair Daly, Mindy Ellis	3:19
8.	"When Ends Don't Meet"	Dan Isbell, Tony Lane, Jonathan Singleton	3:38
9.	"Outta My Head"	Michael Carter, Kinney, Swindell	3:32
10.	"That's Why God Made a Front Porch"	Campbell, Lee Thomas Miller	4:08
11.	"You Can Come Over"	Brandy Clark, Jessie Jo Dillon, Mark Narmore	3:35
12.	"Lotta Good That Does Me Now"	Campbell, Michael White, Justin Wilson	3:49
Total length:			42:36

== Personnel ==
- Craig Campbell - lead vocals
- Preslee Campbell - vocals on "When She Grows Up"
- J.T. Corenflos - electric guitar
- Dan Dugmore - steel guitar, lap steel guitar
- Stuart Duncan - fiddle
- Tommy Harden - drums, percussion
- Joel Key - banjo
- Andy Leftwich - fiddle, mandolin
- Brent Mason - acoustic guitar, electric guitar
- John Mock - harmonium
- Billy Panda - acoustic guitar
- Gary Prim - Hammond B-3 organ, piano
- Matt Rovey - background vocals
- John Wesley Ryles - background vocals
- Jimmie Lee Sloas- bass guitar
- Scott Vestal - banjo

== Chart performance ==
=== Album ===
Chart (2013–14)	Peak position
Australian Albums Chart	97
U.S. Billboard Top Country Albums	27
U.S. Billboard 200	96

=== Singles ===
Year	Single	Peak chart positions			
Year	Single	US Country	US Country Airplay	US	CAN Country
2012	"Outta My Head"	25	15	90	—
2013	"Keep Them Kisses Comin'"	15	9	72	29
"—" denotes releases that did not chart
