= Keep Them Kisses Comin' =

Single by Craig Campbell

from the album Never Regret
- Released: December 2, 2013
- Genre: Country
- Length: 2:40
- Label: Bigger Picture Music Group
- Songwriters: Dallas Davidson; Ben Hayslip
- Producers: Matt Rovey; Keith Stegall

Craig Campbell singles chronology
| "Outta My Head" (2012) | "Keep Them Kisses Comin'" (2013) | "Tomorrow Tonight" (2015) |

"Keep Them Kisses Comin'" is a song recorded by American country music artist Craig Campbell. It was released in December 2013 as the second single from his second studio album, Never Regret. The song was written by Dallas Davidson and Ben Hayslip.

== Music video ==
The music video was directed by Shea Windley and premiered in May 2014.

== Chart performance ==
"Keep Them Kisses Comin'" debuted at number 54 on the U.S. Billboard Country Airplay chart for the week of December 28, 2013, and at number 40 on the U.S. Billboard Hot Country Songs chart for the week of March 8, 2014. It also debuted at number 99 on the U.S. Billboard Hot 100 chart for the week of May 17, 2014. It became Campbell's highest charting single in April 2014, becoming his only Top Ten hit. As of July 2014, the song has sold 244,000 copies in the U.S.

| Chart (2013–2014) | Peak position |
|---|---|
| Canada Country (Billboard) | 29 |
| US Billboard Hot 100 | 72 |
| US Country Airplay (Billboard) | 9 |
| US Hot Country Songs (Billboard) | 15 |

=== Year-end charts ===
| Chart (2014) | Position |
|---|---|
| US Country Airplay (Billboard) | 50 |
| US Hot Country Songs (Billboard) | 52 |

== Certifications ==
| Region | Certification | Certified units/sales |
|---|---|---|
| United States (RIAA) | Gold | 500,000^{‡} |
^{‡} Sales+streaming figures based on certification alone.
