= Harter (surname) =

Harter is a surname. Notable people with the surname include:

- Ali Harter (born 1984), American singer-songwriter
- Andy Harter (born 1961), English computer scientist
- Carol Harter (1941–2023), American university president
- Dick Harter (1930–2012), American basketball player and coach
- Dow W. Harter (1885–1971), American politician
- Frank Harter (1886–1959), American baseball player
- George Loyd Foster Harter (1852–1920), British barrister and High Sheriff of Gloucestershire
- J. Francis Harter (1897–1947), American politician
- J. Michael Harter (born 1979), American singer-songwriter
  - The Harters, a country music group of which J. Michael Harter was a member
- Michael D. Harter (1846–1896), American politician
- Rachel M. Harter, American statistician
- Roy Harter (born 1973), American composer and musician
