= Outta My Head (Craig Campbell song) =

Single by Craig Campbell

from the album Never Regret
- Released: September 17, 2012
- Recorded: 2012
- Genre: Country
- Length: 3:32
- Label: Bigger Picture Music Group
- Songwriters: Michael Carter; Brandon Kinney; Cole Swindell
- Producers: Matt Rovey; Keith Stegall

Craig Campbell singles chronology
"When I Get It" (2011)	"Outta My Head" (2012)	"Keep Them Kisses Comin'" (2013)

"Outta My Head" is a song recorded by American country music artist Craig Campbell. It was released in September 2012 as the first single from his second studio album, Never Regret. The song was written by Michael Carter, Brandon Kinney and Cole Swindell.

== Critical reception ==
Billy Dukes of Taste of Country gave the song two and a half stars out of five, calling it "a nondescript, mid-tempo country song that could have been recorded by anyone at any time." Matt Bjorke of Roughstock gave the song a favorable review, writing that "Keith Stegall and Matt Rovey's production is stellar and gives Craig Campbell the right of contemporary muscle to go with his neotraditional country roots."

== Music video ==
The music video was directed by Mason Dixon and premiered in November 2012.

== Chart performance ==
"Outta My Head" debuted at number 49 on the U.S. Billboard Hot Country Songs chart for the week of October 20, 2012. It also debuted at number 60 on the U.S. Billboard Country Airplay chart for the week of October 20, 2012. It also debuted at number 96 on the U.S. Billboard Hot 100 chart for the week of September 28, 2013.

The song entered top 20 on the Country Airplay charts in its forty-ninth week, thus surpassing by nine weeks the record previously set by Lee Brice's "Love Like Crazy" for the slowest ascent to the top 20. As of October 2013, the song has sold 264,000 copies in the US.

Chart (2012–2013)	Peak position
US Billboard Hot 100	90
US Country Airplay (Billboard)	15
US Hot Country Songs (Billboard)	25

=== Year-end charts ===
Chart (2013)	Position
US Country Airplay (Billboard)	53
US Hot Country Songs (Billboard)	69
