= Michael Harter =

Michael Harter may refer to:

- Michael D. Harter (1846–1896), U.S. Representative from Ohio
- J. Michael Harter (born 1979), American country music artist
