= We Ride (Bryan Martin song) =

2022 single by Bryan Martin

Single by Bryan Martin

from the album Poets & Old Souls
- Released: October 28, 2022
- Genre: Country
- Length: 3:08
- Label: Average Joes Entertainment
- Songwriters: Bryan Martin; Vernon Brown
- Producer: Nick Gibbens

Bryan Martin singles chronology
"Fafo" (2022)	"We Ride" (2022)	"Wolves Cry" (2023)

Music video
- "We Ride" on YouTube

"We Ride" is a song by American country music singer Bryan Martin. It was released on October 28, 2022 as the lead single from his third studio album Poets & Old Souls. A sleeper hit, it received more attention in 2023 after having gained traction on the video-sharing app TikTok, and was released as Martin's debut single to country radio on September 18, 2023. It is Martin's first song to reach the Billboard Hot 100, debuting at number 96 and peaking at number 56.

== Background ==
Regarding the creation of the song, Martin said, "My drummer and I wanted to write a song with some soul, we sat down and this is what we came up with. I hope this one touches people's hearts the same way it touched mine." Martin began teasing the song on TikTok in September 2022 through clips of him performing an acoustic version of it. The song has soundtracked more than 26,000 clips on the platform.

== Composition ==
The song uses a Western-leaning guitar instrumental. In the lyrics, Martin details his everyday struggles in life and reveals he has a rebellious side that always seems to be causing him trouble.

== Critical reception ==
Jess of Taste of Country commented the guitar line "gives the song its rugged charm." Jessica Nicholson of Billboard praised the song for Martin's "grizzly vocal" and how his lyrics pair with a "rock-seared, ramblin'-man sense of defiance and honesty".

== Charts ==
=== Weekly charts ===
Weekly chart performance for "We Ride"
Chart (2024)	Peak position
Canada (Canadian Hot 100)	71
Canada Country (Billboard)	12
US Billboard Hot 100	56
US Country Airplay (Billboard)	3
US Hot Country Songs (Billboard)	16

=== Year-end charts ===
2024 year-end chart performance for "We Ride"
Chart (2024)	Position
US Country Airplay (Billboard)	22
US Hot Country Songs (Billboard)	27

== Certifications ==
Certifications for "We Ride"
Region	Certification	Certified units/sales
New Zealand (RMNZ)	Platinum	30,000^{‡}
United States (RIAA)	3× Platinum	3,000,000^{‡}
^{‡} Sales+streaming figures based on certification alone.

== Release history ==
Release history for "Doin' This"
Region	Date	Format	Label	Ref.
Various	October 28, 2022	Digital download; streaming	Average Joes Entertainment	
United States	September 18, 2023	Country radio	Average Joes Entertainment	
