= The Lacs =

American hip hop group

The LACs
- Origin: Baxley, Georgia, US
- Genre: Country rap
- Years active: 2002–present
- Labels: Side Ya Mouth; Backroad; Dirt Rock Empire
- Members: Brian Andrew "Rooster" King; Robert Clayton "Uncle Snap" Sharpe
- Past members: Dennis Morgan

The Lacs is an American country rap duo that consists of Robert Clayton (Clay) "Uncle Snap" Sharpe and Brian Andrew "Rooster" King. At first, the group also featured Brandon Herndon on the three self-released albums on Side Ya Mouth Records.

The Lacs have recorded six albums for Backroad Records, a subsidiary of Average Joes Entertainment, an independent label co-owned by fellow country rap artist Colt Ford. Four albums have entered the Billboard 200: Keep it Redneck (2013), Outlaw in Me and American Rebelution (2017).

The Lacs created their own record label Dirt Rock Empire in 2017. On September 22, 2017, The Lacs released the first album from Dirt Rock titled Dirtbagz, Vol. 1, which is a compilation album featuring many of the label's artists, such as Nate Kenyon, Crucifix and Hard Target.

== Discography ==
=== Albums ===
Title	Album details	Peak chart positions					Sales
Title	Album details	US Country	US	US Heat	US Indie	US Rap	Sales
Midas Well Get Drunk	Release date: 2002; Label: Side Ya Mouth Records; Formats: CD, music download	—	—	—	—	—	
South on Fire	Release date: 2002; Label: Side Ya Mouth Records; Formats: CD, music download	—	—	—	—	—	
Lacology	Release date: November 17, 2006; Label: Side Ya Mouth Records; Formats: CD, music download	—	—	—	—	—	
Country Boy's Paradise	Release date: February 15, 2011; Label: Backroad Records; Formats: CD, music download	52	—	27	—	—	US: 39,530
190 Proof	Release date: April 3, 2012; Label: Backroad Records; Formats: CD, music download	16	68	—	9	8	US: 83,075
Keep It Redneck	Release date: August 20, 2013; Label: Backroad Records; Formats: CD, music download	3	23	—	7	5	US: 100,000
Nothing in Particular	Release date: October 28, 2014; Label: Backroad Records; Formats: CD, music download	20	86	—	21	11	US: 26,000
Outlaw in Me	Release date: May 26, 2015; Label: Backroad Records; Formats: CD, music download	3	27	—	2	3	US: 31,600
Welcome to Dodge City (with Hard Target)	Release date: August 5, 2016; Label: Barn Burner Records; Formats: CD, music download	22	—	—	16	10	US: 3,100
American Rebelution	Release date: April 7, 2017; Label: Backroad Records; Formats: CD, music download	10	65	—	8	22	US: 21,600
Dirt Rock	Release date: May 4, 2018; Label: Dirt Rock Empire; Formats: CD, music download	24	178	—	12	—	US: 15,700
Rise and Shine	Release date: October 18, 2019; Label: Dirt Rock Empire; Formats: CD, music download	—	—	—	21	—	US: 3,200
Kickin' Up Mud	Release date: January 31, 2020; Label: Backroad Records; Formats: music download	—	—	—	—	—	US: 1,500
"—" denotes releases that did not chart

=== Singles ===
Title	Year	Certifications	Album	Credits
"Dirt Road Dollars" (with Nate Kenyon)	2017	RIAA: Gold	Dirtbagz, Vol 1	Written by: Nate Kenyon and The Lacs Produced by : Wess Nyle Mixed by: Wess Nyle Mastered by: Dave Fore

=== Other certified songs ===
Title	Year	Certifications	Album
"Country Road"	2006	RIAA: Gold	Lacology
"Kickin' Up Mud"	2010	RIAA: Gold	Country Boy’s Paradise

=== Guest singles ===
Year	Single	Artist	Album
2014	"Throwdown"	Moonshine Bandits	Calicountry
2015	"Outback"	Moonshine Bandits (with Durwood Black)	Blacked Out

=== Music videos ===
Year	Video	Director
2011	"Kickin' Up Mud"	David Poag
2011	"Country Boy's Paradise"	Phivestarr Productions
2011	"Country Road"	Phivestarr Productions
2012	"Shake It" (with Big & Rich)	Potsy Ponciroli
2012	"Let Your Country Hang Out"	
2012	"Wylin'" (with Bubba Sparxxx)	
2013	"Field Party" (with JJ Lawhorn)	
2013	"Keep It Redneck"	Potsy Ponciroli
2014	"Smokestack"	
2014	"Nothing in Particular"	
2014	"Throwdown" (with Moonshine Bandits)	Scott Hansen
2015	"God Bless a Country Girl"	
2015	"Outback (Extended Remix)" (with Moonshine Bandits, Durwood Black, Redneck Souljers, Bubba Sparxxx, D. Thrash, Lenny Cooper, Demun Jones & Moccasin Creek)	
2015	"Make the Rooster Crow"	IvinxPryor
2015	"Tonight on Repeat" (with Josh Thompson)	Ed Pryor
2016	"Back to Georgia" (with Craig Campbell)	Ed Pryor
2016	"Out Here"	
2017	"Drink as a Team"	Casey Pierce
2017	"Jack in My Coke" (with Montgomery Gentry)	
2018	"Redneck Rockstar"	Chris Hicky
2018	"Country Livin"	Crucifix & Joshua Kirk
2018	"Willie Nelson" (with Nate Kenyon)	Crucifix & Joshua Kirk
2018	"Red Eyes"	Crucifix & Joshua Kirk
2019	"City Boy's Nightmare" (with Nate Kenyon)	
