= When I Get It =

Single by Craig Campbell

from the album Craig Campbell
- Released: December 17, 2011
- Genre: Country
- Length: 3:19
- Label: Bigger Picture Music Group
- Songwriter(s): Craig Campbell, Patrick Jason Matthews, Jim McCormick
- Producer(s): Keith Stegall

Craig Campbell singles chronology
"Fish" (2011)	"When I Get It" (2011)	"Outta My Head" (2012)

"When I Get It" is a song co-written and recorded by American country music artist Craig Campbell. It was released in December 2011 as the third single from the album Craig Campbell. The song reached #38 on the Billboard Hot Country Songs chart. The song was written by Campbell, Patrick Jason Matthews and Jim McCormick.

== Content ==
The song tells the story of a goodhearted man trying to fight off bill collectors. The first verse is that phone call trying those hurting for jobs and money know all too well. He brushes him off saying/ "When I get it / you'll get it / Times are tough, get in line and wait / When I get it you'll get it / And that's all you're getting today."

He shows a wry sense of humor in the song's second verse. "My ex wife's at the door knocking / Lord that woman won't leave me alone / Same question, where's my money / Well honey you can't get blood from a stone./"

== Chart performance ==
Chart (2011–2012)	Peak position
US Hot Country Songs (Billboard)	38
