= Craig Campbell (album) =

Studio album by Craig Campbell
- Released: April 5, 2011
- Recorded: 2010–11
- Genre: Country
- Label: Bigger Picture Music Group
- Producer: Keith Stegall

Craig Campbell chronology
Craig Campbell (2011)	Never Regret (2013)

Singles from Craig Campbell
- 1. "Family Man" Released: July 26, 2010; 2. "Fish" Released: June 6, 2011; 3. "When I Get It" Released: November 28, 2011

Professional ratings
Review scores
Source	Rating
Allmusic	3/5 stars

Craig Campbell is the debut studio album by the American country music artist of the same name. It features his debut single, "Family Man". It was released on April 5, 2011 by Bigger Picture Music Group. As of the chart dated May 7, 2011, the album has sold 15,256 copies in the US. The album's second single, "Fish," was released to country radio on June 6, 2011.

== Track listing ==
No.	Title	Writer(s)	Length
1.	"I Bought It"	Craig Campbell, Philip Douglas, Dan Murph	2:46
2.	"Family Man"	Campbell, Jon Henderson, Joel Shewmake	3:40
3.	"When I Get It"	Campbell, Patrick Jason Matthews, Jim McCormick	3:19
4.	"My Little Cowboy"	Campbell, Dan Couch	4:02
5.	"Makes You Wanna Sang"	Campbell, Rob Hatch, Lance Miller	2:52
6.	"That Going Away Look (About Her)"	Carson Chamberlain, Wade Kirby, Michael White	3:04
7.	"Fish"	Campbell, Arlos Smith, Ashe Underwood	2:49
8.	"Chillaxin'"	Campbell, Hatch, Brice Long	3:20
9.	"That's Music to Me"	Campbell, Chamberlain, Tim Nichols	3:30
10.	"You Probably Ain't"	Campbell, Keith Stegall, White	4:02
11.	"All Night to Get There"	Lee Brice, Vicky McGehee, Stegall	3:31
Total length:			36:55

iTunes bonus tracks
No.	Title	Writer(s)	Length
12.	"You Can't Drown Misery"	Hatch, Jameson Clark	3:50
13.	"This Old Guitar"	Campbell, Hatch, Jason Sellers	3:49

== Personnel ==
- Eddie Bayers - drums
- Craig Campbell - lead vocals
- Stuart Duncan - fiddle, mandolin
- Paul Franklin - steel guitar
- John Hobbs - piano, Wurlitzer
- Brent Mason - electric guitar
- Gary Prim - piano
- John Wesley Ryles - background vocals
- Bobby Terry - acoustic guitar
- Glenn Worf - bass guitar

== Chart performance ==
=== Album ===
Chart (2011)	Peak position
U.S. Billboard Top Country Albums	14
U.S. Billboard 200	65

=== Singles ===
Year	Single	Peak chart positions	
Year	Single	US Country	US
2010	"Family Man"	14	84
2011	"Fish"	23	83
2011	"When I Get It"	38	—
"—" denotes releases that did not chart
