= Family Man (Craig Campbell song) =

Single by Craig Campbell

from the album Craig Campbell
- Released: July 26, 2010
- Recorded: 2010
- Genre: Country
- Length: 3:39
- Label: Bigger Picture Music Group
- Songwriters: Craig Campbell; Jon Henderson; Joel Eric Shewmake
- Producer: Keith Stegall

Craig Campbell singles chronology
| "Family Man" (2010) | "Fish" (2011) |

"Family Man" is a debut song co-written and recorded by American country music singer Craig Campbell. It was released in July 2010 as the first single from his self-titled debut album, which was released on April 5, 2011. Campbell wrote this song with Jon Henderson and Joel Eric Shewmake.

== Content ==
The lyric paints a portrait of a modern working-class man struggling through tough economic times.

== Critical reception ==
Matt Bjorke of Roughstock rated the single four-and-a-half stars out of five, comparing it to Alan Jackson in sound and praising the songwriting. The song also received a positive review from Billboard reviewer Deborah Evans Price, who said that it had a "powerful message" and was a "thoughtful first performance".

== Music video ==
The music video was directed by Shaun Silva and premiered in October 2010.

== Chart performance ==
It debuted at number 60 on the Hot Country Songs charts dated for the week ending August 14, 2010. It also debuted at number 86 on the U.S. Billboard Hot 100 chart for the week of April 9, 2011.

| Chart (2010–2011) | Peak position |
|---|---|
| US Hot Country Songs (Billboard) | 14 |
| US Billboard Hot 100 | 84 |

=== Year-end charts ===
| Chart (2011) | Position |
|---|---|
| US Country Songs (Billboard) | 49 |
