= Kuntry Livin' =

Studio album by Big Smo
- Released: June 3, 2014
- Genre: Country rap
- Length: 47:04
- Label: Elektra Nashville; Warner Bros.
- Producer: Jon Conner; Orig

Big Smo chronology
Backwoods Whiskey (2013)	Kuntry Livin' (2014)	Bringin' It Home (2015)

Kuntry Livin' is the debut major label studio album from the American country rapper Big Smo. It was released on June 3, 2014 by both Elektra Nashville and Warner Bros. Records. The album was produced by Jon Conner and Orig. This album charted at No. 31 on the Billboard 200.

== Background ==
Big Smo previously released two albums through Yayoda Records, and self-released three other studio albums. He then signed to Warner Bros.'s Elektra Nashville label, and released two extended plays, Grass Roots EP in 2012 and 2013's Backwoods Whiskey. Kuntry Livin' marks Big Smo's the major-label debut, and was produced by Jon Conner and Orig.

== Music and lyrics ==
According to Matt Bjorke of Roughstock, Big Smo is one of the foremost artists in a style known as rural rap or hick-hop, "which blends rural, Country themes and melodies with some rap elements (production and vocal delivery)". The music on Kuntry Livin' has been described as spinning "rap rhymes about working-class values over hard-rock riffs".

== Critical reception ==
Professional ratings
Review scores
Source	Rating
AllMusic	3.5/5 stars
Newsday	C+
Roughstock	3.5/5 stars
USA Today	2.5/4 stars

Kuntry Livin' met with a moderate reception from music critics. At USA Today, Brian Mansfield rated the album two-and-a-half stars out of four, remarking how Big Smo's "cadences sound too similar, but the best connect like a hammer". David Jeffries of AllMusic rated the album three-and-a-half stars out of five, proclaiming that while "the corporate cornpone formula will pay off splendidly", the release "can't be written off so easily." At Newsday, Verne Gay graded the album a C+, cautioning in his bottom line that "This (almost) music-free opener makes you wonder what the fuss is about." Matt Bjorke of Roughstock rated the album three-and-a-half stars out of five, highlighting how "Those that open their ears may just find themselves tapping their toes or nodding their head along to the rhythmic Rural Rap".

== Commercial performance ==
For the Billboard charting week of June 21, 2014, Kuntry Livin' charted as the No. 31 most sold album according to the Billboard 200. It charted as the No. 9 in the Top Country Albums market with 9,000 copies sold, and it sold enough to chart at No. 3 on the Rap Albums chart. As of July 2015, the album has sold 151,400 copies in the US.

== Track listing ==
Kuntry Livin'
No.	Title	Writer(s)	Length
1.	"Workin'" (featuring Alexander King)	John Lee Smith; Jon Conner; Alexander King; Orig	3:35
2.	"Bumpy Road"	Smith; Rhett Akins; Conner; Orig; Rob Parissi	2:51
3.	"Hick Ross"	Smith	3:16
4.	"Anything Goes" (featuring Alexander King)	Smith; Conner; King; Orig	3:44
5.	"Cover My Eyes" (featuring Haden Carpenter)	Smith; Conner; Jesse Scott Hill	3:41
6.	"Down in the Backwoods"	Smith; Conner; King; Orig	2:51
7.	"Come On" (featuring Frankie Ballard)	Smith; Conner; Foz Rock; King; Orig	2:36
8.	"Redneck Rich"	Smith; Conner; Orig; Bobby Pinson	2:43
9.	"Who I'll Be"	Smith; Conner; King; Orig	3:25
10.	"Got Me"	Smith; Casey Beathard; Conner; Orig	2:50
11.	"Ain't Nothin' Free"	Smith; Jim Beavers; Conner; Orig	3:21
12.	"I'm So Kuntry"	Smith	3:08
13.	"Lawdy Lawdy"	Smith; Beathard; Conner; Orig	5:45
14.	"My Place" (featuring Darius Rucker)		3:18
Total length:			47:04

== Chart performance ==
=== Weekly charts ===
Chart (2014)	Peak position
US Billboard 200	31
US Top Country Albums (Billboard)	6
US Top Rap Albums (Billboard)	3

=== Year-end charts ===
Chart (2014)	Position
US Top Country Albums (Billboard)	42
US Top Rap Albums (Billboard)	21
Chart (2015)	Position
US Top Country Albums (Billboard)	65
