= Fish (song) =

Single by Craig Campbell

from the album Craig Campbell
- Released: June 6, 2011
- Recorded: 2010
- Genre: Country
- Length: 2:49
- Label: Bigger Picture Music Group
- Songwriters: Craig Campbell; Arlos Smith; Ashe Underwood
- Producer: Keith Stegall

Craig Campbell singles chronology
"Family Man" (2010)	"Fish" (2011)	"When I Get It" (2011)

"Fish" is a song co-written and recorded by American country music singer Craig Campbell. It was released in June 2011 as the second single from his self-titled debut album. Campbell wrote this song with Arlos Smith and Ashe Underwood.

== Content ==
The song's rhyming scheme implies the word "fuck", which is replaced at the last second by "fish" ("I had everything we needed in the back of my truck / Turns out my baby loves to fish").

== Critical reception ==
William Ruhlmann of Allmusic described the song as "a single-entendre joke of the kind that hasn't been heard since that old sophomoric tune 'Shaving Cream'".

Matt Bjorke of Roughstock gave the single three stars out of five, saying that it "may not be deep or anything of that sort but it is perfect for summer time playlists and that ultimately makes it a successful single."

== Music video ==
The music video was directed by Wes Edwards and stars the host of the World Fishing Network's Hookin' Up with Mariko Izumi, who plays his love interest.

== Chart performance ==
Chart (2011)	Peak position
US Hot Country Songs (Billboard)	23
US Billboard Hot 100	83

=== Year-end charts ===
Chart (2011)	Position
US Country Songs (Billboard)	81

== Certifications ==
Region	Certification	Certified units/sales
United States (RIAA)	Gold	500,000^{‡}
^{‡} Sales+streaming figures based on certification alone.
