= Big Smo =

American singer and rapper (born 1976)

SMO/Big Smo
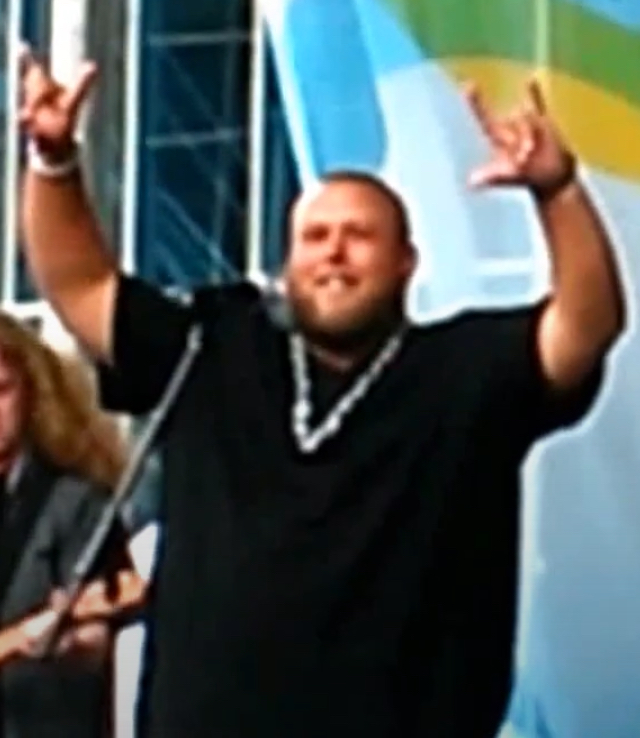
- Big Smo performing in 2014

Background information
- Also known as: Smo
- Born: John Smith; February 14, 1976 (age 49); San Diego, California, US
- Origin: Shelbyville, Tennessee, US
- Genres: Country rap
- Occupations: Singer; rapper; songwriter; record producer; film director
- Instrument: Vocals
- Years active: 1999–present
- Labels: Yayoda; Elektra Nashville; Warner Bros.; Edge Music Nashville; Average Joe's Entertainment
- Website: www.therealbigsmo.com

John Smith (born February 14, 1976), known by his stage name Big Smo, is an American country rap musician, singer, songwriter, record producer and film director. After several independent and minor label releases, Smo's major label debut studio album, Kuntry Livin', was released in 2014 and charted on three Billboard charts. He was the subject of an eponymous reality television series on A&E that began in 2014.

== Early life ==
John Lee Smith was born in San Diego, California, to mother Mary Jane Smith and father Carl Avery Smith. His father, who was a veteran of the U.S. Navy, died in 2007. His mother is his business manager.

== Music career ==
Smith started his musical endeavors in 1999, but did not release an album for three years. He released Kuntry Kitchen with Yayoda Records in 2002. Then, he released another album with Yayoda in 2007 entitled The True South. His last self-released album was 2018's Special Reserve In 2010, his homemade music video "Kickin' It in Tennessee" went viral, garnering over five million views on YouTube. He released two EPs with Warner Bros. Records that were 2012's Grass Roots and 2013's Backwoods Whiskey. Smith's major-label debut came out in 2014, entitled Kuntry Livin'.

== Musical style ==
According to Matt Bjorke of Roughstock, Big Smo is one of the foremost grassroots artists in a style known as rural rap or hick-hop, "which blends rural, Country themes and melodies with some rap elements (production and vocal delivery)". AllMusic's Steve Legget commented that Big Smo "combines country themes and attitudes with rap and hip-hop in a style that prompted one reviewer to note 'If Kid Rock and Run–D.M.C. had a love child, he would be named Big Smo,' although combining Hank Williams Jr. with Nappy Roots might strike a bit closer." Rolling Stone described Big Smo as sounding like "If Run–D.M.C.'s 'Walk This Way' stomped out of Queens and ended up in the rural south." The music on Kuntry Livin' was described as spinning "rap rhymes about working-class values over hard-rock riffs."

== Other media ==
Smith was the principal subject of an eponymously titled television series, Big Smo. The program, about his life and music by A&E, debuted in June 2014. He appeared in one episode, "Empty Bottles Full Cans", of the Spike TV series Bar Rescue.

His life is featured in episode one, "Kuntry Livin", of CarbonTV's original series Heartlandia, showing him shooting guns, cooking, and making music.

== Personal life ==
Smith lives on his 32 acres (13 ha) family farm compound known as, the "Kuntry Ranch", located in Unionville, Tennessee, a part of the Shelbyville, Tennessee Micropolitan Statistical Area. In 2024, after losing 225 pounds, he announced plans to open a plant-based food truck in Shelbyville.

== Discography ==
=== Studio albums ===
List of studio albums, with selected chart positions
Title	Album details	Peak chart positions		
Title	Album details	US	US Country	US Rap
Kuntry Kitchen	Released: 2002; Label: Yayoda; Format: CD	—	—	—
The True South	Released: 2007; Label: Yayoda; Format: CD	—	—	—
American Made	Released: 2010; Label: Big Smo Inc; Formats: CD, digital download	—	—	—
Kuntry Livin'	Released: June 3, 2014; Label: Elektra Nashville/Warner Bros.; Formats: CD, digital download	31	6	3
We the People	Released: July 22, 2016; Label: Elektra Nashville/Warner Bros.; Formats: CD, digital download	—	—	—
Special Reserve	Released: February 23, 2018; Label: Edge Music Nashville; Formats: CD, digital download	—	—	—
This One's for You	Released: August 23, 2019; Label: Average Joe's Entertainment; Formats: CD, digital download			
"—" denotes releases that did not chart

=== Extended plays ===
List of EPs, with selected chart positions
Title	Album details	Peak chart positions			
Title	Album details	US	US Country	US Heat	US Rap
Grass Roots EP	Released: June 19, 2012; Label: Elektra Nashville/Warner Bros; Formats: CD, digital download	—	71	—	—
Backwoods Whiskey	Released: November 11, 2013; Label: Elektra Nashville/Warner Bros.; Formats: CD, digital download	—	69	39	—
Bringin' It Home	Released: June 16, 2015; Label: Elektra Nashville/Warner Bros.; Formats: CD, digital download	130	12	—	7
"—" denotes releases that did not chart

=== Singles ===
Year	Single	Album
2014	"Workin'" (with Alexander King)	Kuntry Livin'
2016	"Retox" (with Todd Nielsen)	We the People

==== Other charting songs ====
Year	Single	Peak positions	Album
Year	Single	US Country	Album
2014	"My Place" (with Darius Rucker)	49	Kuntry Livin'

=== Music videos ===
Year	Video	Director
2014	"My Place" (with Darius Rucker)	Richard Murray
