= Rascal (song) =

Song by RMR

Single by RMR

from the EP Drug Dealing Is a Lost Art
- Released: February 26, 2020
- Genre: Country pop; country trap
- Label: Warner; CMNTY
- Songwriters: Jeffrey Hanna; Robert Boyd; Wade Branch III
- Producer: The Do Betters

"Rascal" is a song recorded by American singer and rapper RMR. It was released as a single on February 26, 2020, and is included on the EP Drug Dealing Is a Lost Art.

== Background ==
The song was compared to Lil Nas X's Grammy-winning single "Old Town Road", being called the song's "second coming", which fused hip hop and country music. The instrumental is a piano cover of "Bless the Broken Road", a song made famous by Rascal Flatts that was first recorded by the Nitty Gritty Dirt Band while interpolating the band's song "These Days" in the intro.

In June 2020, a remix of the song featuring rapper Young Thug was also released.

== Music video ==
The music video of the song was released to YouTube on February 26, 2020, exhibiting irony in the audio and video, as the video shows RMR and his crew wearing ski masks and holding firearms, appearing in a ruffian-like manner, with ballad music. The video was described as a typical "trap music video with all the classic tropes", and Uproxx called it "a typical underground rap clip, with a squad of menacing-looking, ski-masked goons mugging the camera and brandishing all sorts of illegal-looking firearms."
