= Rich O'Toole =

American singer-songwriter (born 1983)

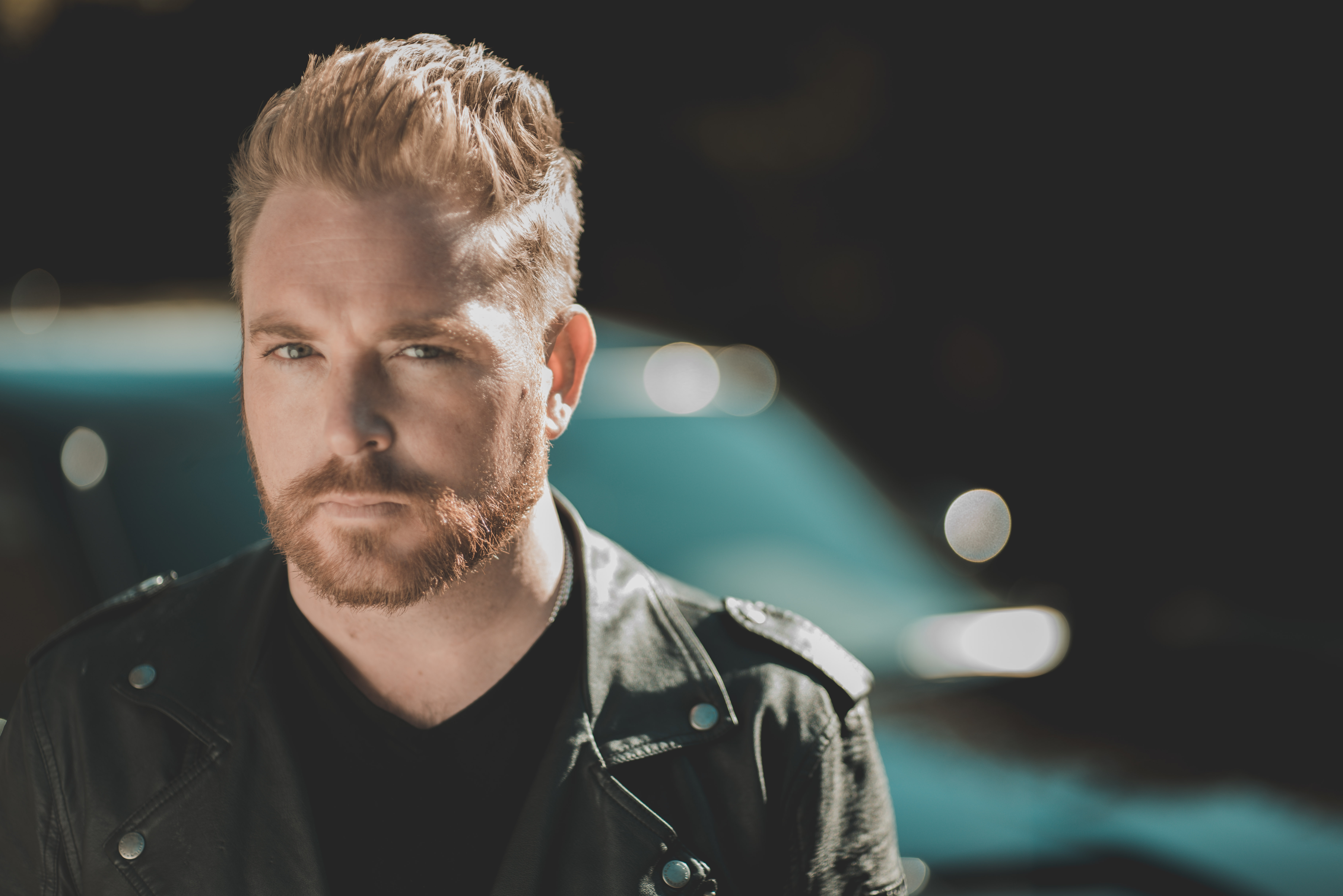
- Rich O'Toole in 2016

Background information
- Born: August 6, 1983 (age 42)
- Origin: Houston, Texas, U.S.
- Genres: Country
- Instruments: Vocals, guitar
- Years active: 2006–present
- Label: PTO Records
- Website: Official website

Rich O'Toole (born August 6, 1983) is an American country singer-songwriter from Houston, Texas.

== Career ==
In early 2006, O'Toole released his debut album, Seventeen. Americana Music Times, then called Texas Music Times, named Seventeen the "Best Album of 2006 That No One Told You About."

O'Toole released his second album, the Mack Damon produced In a Minute or 2, on October 21, 2008. O'Toole's third album, Kiss of a Liar featured the duet with Josh Abbott titled "Ay Dios Mio" and a cover of Wilco's "Casino Queen" with guest performer Pat Green.

O'Toole co-produced his fourth album, Brightwork, with Damon and Ilya Toshinsky and released it on his personal record label, PTO Records. His latest album, Jaded, also on PTO, was released in June 2014.

O’Toole released his 6th studio album "American Kid” on March 17, 2017. Which reached to 43 on the Billboard Country Charts and No. 5 on the Country iTunes Chart.

In 2020 O’Toole signed a record deal with Average Joe's Entertainment giving him his own record imprint Buffalo Roam Records which released his 7th studio album “New York”.

With over 50 Million streams on Spotify & Apple Music O’Toole has become a household name in the Texas Music scene. O’Toole is also a member of Mensa has launched several different successful iPhone Apps. “TexMoji” which sold over 65,000 units its first week and was featured in Time & People Magazine.

O’Toole released his 8th studio album “Ghost” which reached #5 on the iTunes charts nation wide. Country Music France said the album was one of the best written records of 2024.

In 2025 O’Toole moved to Fredericksburg, TX to be closer to the recording studio Stone Creek Sound in Helotes, TX. O’Toole is currently writing and recording his 9th studio album.

== Discography ==
=== Studio albums ===
Title	Album details	Peak positions
Title	Album details	US Country
Seventeen	Release date: March 20, 2007; Label: self-released	—
In a Minute or 2	Release date: October 21, 2008; Label: Smith Music Group	—
Kiss of a Liar	Release date: July 19, 2011; Label: Average Joe's Entertainment	73
Brightwork	Release date: February 19, 2013; Label: PTO Records	—
Jaded	Release date: June 17, 2014; Label: PTO Records	10
American Kid	March 17, 2017	43

=== Music videos ===
Year	Video	Director
2008	"In A Minute or 2"	Mack Damon
2011	"The Cricket Song"	
2011	"Kiss of A Liar"	
2012	"Marijuana and Jalapenos"	
2012	"Drunk Girl"	Ted A. Borel
2013	"Messin' Around"	Ted A. Borel
2016	"Back to Back"	Kasey James and Ted Borel
2017	"Take It From Here"	
