= Harter Fell =

Harter Fell may refer to:

- Harter Fell (Eskdale), a mountain in the Eskdale valley in the western part of Lake District National Park, England
- Harter Fell (Mardale), a mountain in the Mardale valley in the eastern part of Lake District National Park, England
- Harter Fell, Lunedale, an area of upland heath in County Durham, England
- Harter Fell (Howgills), a hill in the Yorkshire Dales
