= Outskirts of Heaven =

Single by Craig Campbell
- Released: April 11, 2016
- Genre: Country
- Length: 4:04
- Label: Red Bow
- Songwriters: Craig Campbell; Dave Turnbull
- Producer: Mickey Jack Cones

Craig Campbell singles chronology
"Tomorrow Tonight" (2015)	"Outskirts of Heaven" (2016)	"See You Try" (2018)

"Outskirts of Heaven" is a song recorded by American country music singer Craig Campbell. The song is Campbell's second release for Broken Bow Records imprint Red Bow, and his seventh single overall. Campbell wrote the song with Dave Turnbull.

== Content ==
The song is about the narrator's desires to live "on the outskirts of Heaven" when he dies, comparing such a place to his rural lifestyle.

It is in a 3/4 time signature, including accompaniment from Troy Lancaster on electric guitar, Mike Johnson on steel guitar, and Tony Harrell on piano. During the production process, Campbell asked producer Mickey Jack Cones to make the intro softer so the song could "grow".

== Critical reception ==
A review from Taste of Country was favorable, praising Campbell's singing voice and the production.

The song has sold 90,000 copies in the United States as of March 2017.

== Chart performance ==
=== Weekly charts ===
Chart (2016–2017)	Peak position
US Country Airplay (Billboard)	24
US Hot Country Songs (Billboard)	32

=== Year-end charts ===
Chart (2017)	Position
US Hot Country Songs (Billboard)	93
