= Tomorrow Tonight =

Single by Craig Campbell
- Released: June 8, 2015
- Genre: Country
- Length: 3:06
- Label: Red Bow
- Songwriters: Craig Campbell; Justin Wilson; Vicky McGehee
- Producer: Jeremy Stover

Craig Campbell singles chronology
"Keep Them Kisses Comin'" (2013)	"Tomorrow Tonight" (2015)	"Outskirts of Heaven" (2016)

"Tomorrow Tonight" is a song co-written and recorded by American country music artist Craig Campbell. It was released to radio on June 8, 2015, as the lead-off single to his upcoming third studio album, yet to be announced. The song was written by Campbell, Justin Wilson, and Vicky McGehee.

== Music video ==
The music video was directed by Chris Hicky and premiered in July 2015.

== Chart performance ==
Chart (2015)	Peak position
US Country Airplay (Billboard)	39
