= Ryan Kinder =

American country music singer

- Born: August 1, 1988 (age 37); Knoxville, Tennessee, U.S.
- Origin: Nashville, Tennessee, U.S.
- Genres: Country
- Occupation(s): Singer, songwriter
- Instrument: Vocals
- Years active: 2013-present
- Labels: Bigger Picture, Warner, Crimson Garden

Ryan Kinder (born August 1, 1988) is an American country music singer. He has charted three singles on Billboard Country Airplay.

== Biography ==
Ryan Kinder was born August 1, 1988 in Knoxville, Tennessee, but grew up in Birmingham, Alabama. He taught himself how to play guitar as a teenager, and began performing locally while still in high school. In 2007, he self-released a self-titled independent album. Kinder moved to Nashville, Tennessee, in 2012 to begin a country music career. He was signed to Bigger Picture Music Group, an independent record label owned by producer Keith Stegall. The label released two singles, "Kiss Me When I'm Down" and "Tonight", prior to the label's closure in 2014. Following the label's closure, Zac Brown Band booked him as an opening act, which led to him being discovered by Warner Records executive Peter Strickland. The label signed him in 2015. By year's end, the label had re-recorded and re-released "Tonight" with production from Paul Worley.

This was followed in 2016 by another single, "Close". Billy Dukes of Taste of Country thought Kinder's voice was expressive and reminiscent of Drake White. Two more singles, "Still Believe in Crazy Love" and "Stay", followed in 2017 and 2018, respectively.

In 2021, he released an album titled Room to Dream via Crimson Garden Records. The album includes the single "Something", which he co-wrote with Dave Barnes.

== Discography ==
Albums

- Ryan Kinder (2007)
- Room to Dream (2021)
- The Beginning of Things (2025)

Singles

Year	Single	Peak chart positions
Year	Single	US Country Airplay
2014	"Kiss Me When I'm Down"	59
2016	"Tonight"	51
2017	"Close"	55
2017	"Still Believe in Crazy Love"	—
2018	"Stay"	—
2021	"Something"	—
