= RMR (musician) =

American rapper and singer (born 1996)

- Born: 1996 (age 29–30); Accra, Ghana
- Origin: Los Angeles, California, U.S.
- Genres: Hip-hop; country rap; country trap; country pop
- Occupations: Rapper; singer; songwriter
- Years active: 2019–present
- Labels: RMRHasIt; AWAL Recordings America

RMR (pronounced "rumor") is an American rapper and singer. He first attained notoriety when his song "Rascal" went viral on YouTube in February 2020.

RMR was signed to Warner Records and Cmnty Rcrds from 2020 to 2022. After his departure from Warner, he founded his own independent label, RMRHasIt, partnered with AWAL Recordings America.

== Career ==
=== 2020–2022: Breakthrough and Drug Dealing Is a Lost Art ===
In February 2020, RMR independently released the song "Rascal", an interpolation of Rascal Flatts' "Bless the Broken Road", which quickly went viral on YouTube overnight due to its music video and genre-blending style. He signed to Warner Records and Cmnty Rcrds in April 2020. Shortly afterward, he released the single "Dealer", followed days later by a remix featuring American rappers Future and Lil Baby.

On June 12, 2020, he released his debut extended play, Drug Dealing Is a Lost Art. The eight-track EP contains guest appearances from Future, Lil Baby, Westside Gunn, and Young Thug. On November 12, 2020, he released "The Wishing Hour", a reworking of the Matchbox Twenty song "3AM". It was subsequently announced that RMR's next project would be titled 4th Qtr Medley, a three-part series of re-imagined songs and interconnected videos similar to "Rascal". Released on November 24, 2020, 4th Qtr Medley featured reworkings of songs by Matchbox Twenty, Drake, and The Goo Goo Dolls.

On January 8, 2021, RMR released "Her Honeymoon", accompanied by an interactive music video featuring three possible endings where viewers could text his personal phone number to vote on the narrative. On May 21, 2021, he released "Vibes" featuring Tyla Yaweh, followed by the collaborative single "Wargasm" with bluegrass musician Billy Strings on June 11, 2021. In August 2021, RMR made his debut live festival appearance at Lollapalooza in Chicago. In 2022, he appeared as a featured artist alongside Shaboozey on the track "Hanging High" from the album Cowboys Live Forever, Outlaws Never Die.

=== 2023–present: Tribune, Stick To The Script, and collaborations ===
After a nearly two-year hiatus from solo releases, RMR returned on March 3, 2023, with the single "Crazy", a collaboration with producer Ryan Lewis. Throughout the remainder of 2023, he released the singles "Fatha Fig Ya (Food For Thought)" featuring Tech N9ne, "FEVER", and "Rings on Saturn", and toured across the United States and Canada supporting Bryce Vine.

On July 12, 2024, RMR released his twelve-track debut studio album, Tribune, via RMRHasIt and AWAL Recordings America, preceded by the singles "Beautiful Chaos" and "Sweet Divorce". In August 2024, he headlined a live showcase at Eulogy in Asheville, North Carolina, in support of the album.

In April 2025, RMR was featured on Wiz Khalifa's sequel album Kush + Orange Juice 2 on the track "Just To See You Smile". In September 2025, RMR and Akon released the collaborative single "Too Cold" through Konvict Kulture and RMRHasIt.

In January 2026, RMR reunited with Wiz Khalifa for three guest appearances on Khalifa's studio album Khaotic: "Head Money Trees Clothes", "Back Against The Wall" (also featuring Max B), and "It's Been A Minute". In April 2026, he joined Akon as a featured vocalist and producer on the song "Konflicted" from Akon's album Beautiful Day. On July 6, 2026, RMR released his eight-track follow-up project, Stick To The Script, alongside 2026 singles "Jolene pt. 2" and "AF" (with Lucien Parker).

== Artistry ==
RMR has received comparisons to Lil Nas X for his musical style, fusing elements of hip-hop and country music alongside R&B melodies. During the initial years of his career, he wore a balaclava and gold grills in public appearances and videos to maintain anonymity and keep listeners focused on the music rather than his persona. In addition to Rascal Flatts, he has cited Kanye West, Drake, Lil Wayne, and Michael Jackson as formative influences on his sound.

== Personal life ==
RMR was born in Accra, Ghana, in 1996, and moved to Minneapolis, Minnesota, at age four before later relocating to Los Angeles, California. After maintaining professional anonymity for several years behind a ski mask, he unmasked in late 2023 in the music video for his single "Rings on Saturn".

In June 2020, RMR participated in A View From The Front Line, a panel discussion on systemic racism in America hosted by Warner Records and moderated by Gail Mitchell, executive director of R&B/Hip-Hop for Billboard, alongside IDK and San Francisco Director of Police Accountability Paul Henderson.

== Discography ==
=== Studio albums ===
Title	Album details
Tribune	Released: July 12, 2024; Label: RMRHasIt, AWAL Recordings America; Format: Digital download, streaming
Stick To The Script	Released: July 6, 2026; Label: RMRHasIt; Format: Digital download, streaming

=== Extended plays ===
Title	EP details
Drug Dealing Is a Lost Art	Released: June 12, 2020; Label: Warner, Cmnty; Format: Digital download, streaming
4th Qtr Medley	Released: November 24, 2020; Label: Warner, Cmnty; Format: Digital download, streaming

=== Singles ===
Title	Year	Album
"Rascal"	2020	Drug Dealing Is a Lost Art
"Dealer" (solo or remix featuring Future and Lil Baby)	2020	Drug Dealing Is a Lost Art
"The Wishing Hour"	2020	4th Qtr Medley
"Her Honeymoon"	2021	Non-album singles
"Vibes" (featuring Tyla Yaweh)	2021	Non-album singles
"Wargasm" (with Billy Strings)	2021	Non-album singles
"Crazy" (with Ryan Lewis)	2023	Non-album singles
"Fatha Fig Ya (Food For Thought)" (with Tech N9ne)	2023	Non-album singles
"FEVER"	2023	Non-album singles
"Rings on Saturn"	2023	Non-album singles
"Beautiful Chaos"	2024	Tribune
"Sweet Divorce"	2024	Tribune
"Adore It" (with Rich Delinquent)	2025	Non-album singles
"Too Cold" (with Akon)	2025	Non-album singles
"Jolene pt. 2"	2026	Non-album singles
"AF" (with Lucien Parker)	2026	Non-album singles

=== Guest appearances ===
Title	Year	Other artist(s)	Album
"Hanging High"	2022	Shaboozey	Cowboys Live Forever, Outlaws Never Die
"Just To See You Smile"	2025	Wiz Khalifa	Kush + Orange Juice 2
"Head Money Trees Clothes"	2026	Wiz Khalifa	Khaotic
"Back Against The Wall"	2026	Wiz Khalifa, Max B	Khaotic
"It's Been A Minute"	2026	Wiz Khalifa	Khaotic
"Konflicted"	2026	Akon	Beautiful Day
