= Corey Smith (singer) =

American singer-songwriter

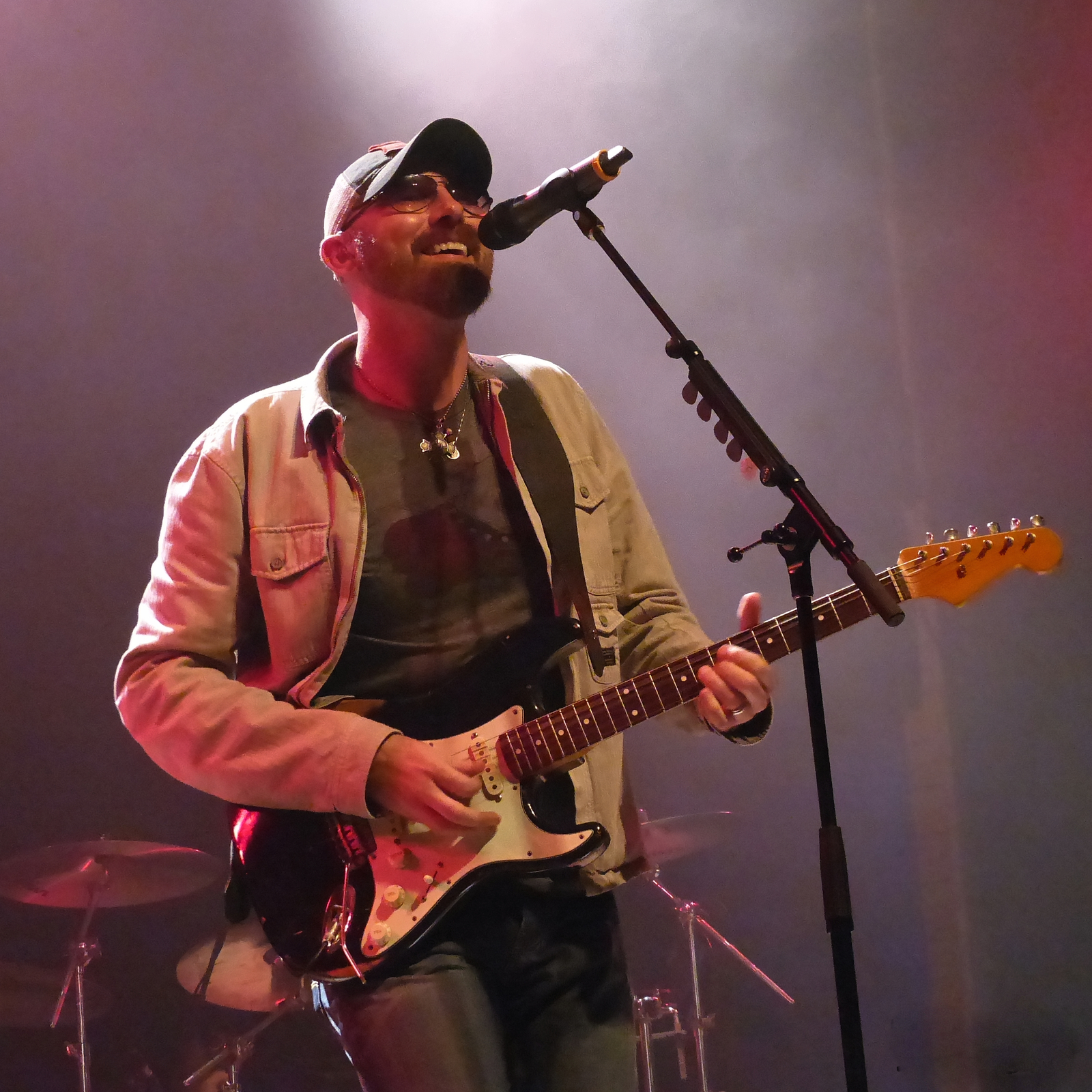
- Smith performing at the House of Blues Sunset Strip in Hollywood in 2013

Background information
- Born: Jefferson, Georgia, United States
- Genres: Country, folk rock
- Occupations: Singer-songwriter, guitarist
- Years active: 2000–present
- Labels: Undertone Records, Average Joes Entertainment, Sugar Hill Records

Corey Smith is an American singer-songwriter and guitarist.

== Background ==
Smith grew up in Jefferson, Georgia, near Athens. He attended the University of Georgia and majored in Social Studies education. While in college, he wrote songs and performed locally. He took a job teaching at North Gwinnett High School in Suwanee, Georgia and taught geography, history, and guitar before deciding to pursue music full-time at the age of 28.

== Albums ==
From his first album Undertones in 2003, Smith self-produced nine albums through independent labels. In 2015 he released his tenth album, While the Getting' Is Good, produced by Keith Stegall on Sugar Hill Records

== Discography ==
=== Studio albums ===
Title	Details	Peak chart positions					
Title	Details	US Country	US	US Folk	US Heat	US Indie	US Rock
Undertones	Release date: September 8, 2003; Label: Razor & Tie; Formats: CD	—	—	—	—	—	—
In the Mood	Release date: October 10, 2004; Label: Undertone Records; Formats: CD, music download	—	—	—	—	—	
The Good Life	Release date: October 10, 2005; Label: Undertone Records; Formats: CD, music download	-	-	-	-	-	-
Hard-Headed Fool	Release date: September 25, 2007; Label: Undertone Records; Formats: CD, music download	—	—	—	—	—	—
Keeping Up with the Joneses	Release date: November 27, 2009; Label: Undertone Records; Formats: CD, music download	—	—	9	26	—	—
The Broken Record	Release date: June 21, 2011; Label: Average Joes Entertainment; Formats: CD, music download	17	114	6	2	20	30
Maysville in the Meantime	Release date: December 2, 2014; Label: Undertone Records; Formats: CD, music download	37	—	16	5	39	—
While the Gettin' Is Good	Release date: June 23, 2015; Label: Sugar Hill Records; Formats: CD, music download	23	—	7	5	—	—
Suburban Drawl	Release date: November 10, 2023; Label: Undertone Records; Formats: CD, music download	—	—	—	—	—	—
"—" denotes releases that did not chart

=== Music videos ===
Year	Video	Director
2011	"Twenty-One"	Potsy Ponciroli
2011	"Drugs"	Potsy Ponciroli
2011	"Maybe Next Year"	David Poag
2013	"Ain't Going Out Tonight"	Hodges Usry
2014	"The Wreckage"	
2015	"Feet Wet"	Hodges Usry
2016	"Blow Me Away"	Hodges Usry
2018	"Empty Rooms"	Abijeet Achar
2018	"Halfway Home"	Abijeet Achar
2018	"Honky Tonkin' In My Blood"	Abijeet Achar
