= Forgiato Blow =

American rapper

- Born: Kurt Jantz
- Occupation: Rapper
- Years active: 2013–present
- Musical career
- Origin: Florida
- Genres: Southern hip hop; political hip hop; trap

Kurt Jantz, known professionally as Forgiato Blow, is an American rapper who is most notable for his work supporting Donald Trump. Jantz describes himself as a pioneer of the pro-Trump hip-hop genre of MAGA rap.

== Early life ==
Jantz was born and raised in West Florida and attended Admiral Farragut Academy.

== Career ==
Jantz released his first album in 2013, with subsequent releases attracting little attention.

In 2016, he released "Silver Spoon", his first pro-Trump song, and "was later able to carve out a niche for himself within the movement surrounding Donald Trump". Since then, his music and videos have been supportive of conservative figures and groups, including Roger Stone, Matt Gaetz, Marjorie Taylor Greene, and the Proud Boys. His music often concerns culture war topics; for instance, a song titled "Boycott Target", which accused Target of grooming children with pride merchandise and reached #1 on iTunes.

Jantz was featured in a song with Vanilla Ice and Kodak Black in 2021.

In September 2025, Jantz released the music video "Good vs Evil", in collaboration with country singer JJ Lawhorn. In the song, which calls for public lynchings, Jantz references the killings of Austin Metcalf, Laken Riley, and Iryna Zarutska, referring to Zarutska's alleged killer as a "nigga".
