= JJ Lawhorn =

American country music singer-songwriter (born 1993)

- Born: Jonathan Wayne Lawhorn; September 1993 (age 32); Hanover County, Virginia
- Genres: Country
- Occupation: Singer-songwriter
- Instruments: Vocals, guitar, banjo
- Years active: 2010–present
- Label: Average Joes Entertainment (former)
- Website: jjlawhorn.com

Jonathan Wayne "JJ" Lawhorn (born September 1993) is an American country music singer-songwriter known for pro-lynching lyrics. Lawhorn was discovered online by producer Jeremy Stover in 2010. He signed with EMI Music Publishing within a year. He signed a recording contract with Average Joes Entertainment, a record label owned by Colt Ford, in June 2011 when he was 17 years old.

Lawhorn's debut album, Original Good Ol' Boy, was released by Average Joes on July 16, 2013. The album was produced by Stover. Lawhorn wrote or co-wrote all thirteen tracks. The album sold 4,000 copies in its first week of release, debuting at number 20 on the Billboard Top Country Albums chart and number 91 on the Billboard 200.

The single "Good Ol' Boys Like Us" was released to country radio on February 17, 2014.

He released the single "Good vs Evil", with Forgiato Blow, in September 2025. The song has widely been interpreted as a call for public lynchings. Many have noted similarities between the actions advocated in the song against those accused of crimes and actions of racial violence often inflicted upon African Americans in the United States. Such actions advocated for being the hanging of criminals from trees, a practice often engaged in during lynchings and advocacy for hanging those accused at "sundown", an apparent reference to sundown towns, a system of racial segregation.

== Personal life ==
Lawhorn graduated from Hanover High School in Mechanicsville, Virginia.

== Discography ==
=== Albums ===
Title	Album details	Peak chart positions		
Title	Album details	US Country	US	US Indie
Original Good Ol' Boy	Release date: July 16, 2013; Label: Average Joes Entertainment	20	91	20

=== Singles ===
Year	Single	Album
2012	"Sittin' on a Tailgate"	Original Good Ol' Boy
2012	"You Can Tell a Man by His Truck"	Original Good Ol' Boy
2013	"Stomping Grounds"	Original Good Ol' Boy
2014	"Good Ol' Boys Like Us"	Original Good Ol' Boy
2025	"Good vs Evil" (with Forgiato Blow)	—N/a

=== Guest singles ===
Year	Single	Artist	Album
2012	"Answer to No One"	Colt Ford	Declaration of Independence
2013	"Field Party"	The Lacs	Keep It Redneck

=== Music videos ===
Year	Video	Director
2012	"Sittin' on a Tailgate"	Travis Nicholson
2012	"Answer to No One" (with Colt Ford)	Paul Cain
2013	"Stomping Grounds"	
2013	"Field Party" (with The Lacs)	
2013	"You Can Tell a Man by His Truck"	
2014	"Good Ol' Boys Like Us"	
2017	"New Kid on the Block"	
2018	"Last of a Dying Breed"	
2018	"Houndsman"	
