= Bryan Martin (singer) =

American country singer

- Born: Logansport, Louisiana, U.S.
- Genres: Country
- Occupation: Singer-songwriter
- Instrument: Vocal
- Years active: 2018–present
- Label: Average Joes Entertainment

Bryan Martin is an American country music singer. In 2023 and 2024, Martin had his first charted entry with the single "We Ride".

== Biography ==
Martin was born in Logansport, Louisiana. As a teenager, he worked on an oil rig in addition to playing American football and bull riding. He broke his collar bone doing the latter, after which he developed an addiction to painkillers. After this, he briefly enlisted in the United States Army and, after an attempted suicide, began recording music.

Martin released the albums If It Was Easy in 2019 and Self Inflicted Scars two years later. In late 2022, his song "We Ride", released through Average Joes Entertainment, began receiving attention on TikTok. By 2023, "We Ride" had begun charting on the Billboard Country Airplay charts, also reaching the Billboard Hot 100 in early 2024. The song is on Martin's third album Poets & Old Souls.

Following the song's release, Martin was booked as an opening act for Morgan Wallen and Warren Zeiders.

== Discography ==
=== Albums ===
- If It Was Easy (2019)
- Self Inflicted Scars (2022)
- Poets & Old Souls (2023)
- Years in the Making (2025)

=== Singles ===
List of singles, with selected peak chart positions
Title	Year	Peak chart positions				Certifications	Album
Title	Year	US	US Country	US Country Airplay	CAN Country	Certifications	Album
"We Ride"	2023	56	16	3	12	RIAA: 3× Platinum; RMNZ: Platinum	Poets & Old Souls
"Wolves Cry"	2024	—	—	53	—	RIAA: Gold	Poets & Old Souls
"Tug O' War"	2026	—	—	—	—		TBD

=== Other certified songs ===
Title	Year	Certifications	Album
"Beauty in the Struggle"	2022	RIAA: Gold	Self Inflicted Scars
"Memory to Drown"	2022	RIAA: Gold	Self Inflicted Scars
"Everyone's an Outlaw"	2022	RIAA: Gold	Self Inflicted Scars
"FAFO" (feat. Charlie Farley, OG Caden, & Austin Tolliver)	2022	RIAA: Gold	non-album single
