= Harter Fell, Lunedale =

Area of upland heath in County Durham, England

Coordinates: 54°36′35″N 2°6′50″W

Harter Fell is an area of upland heath in west County Durham, England. It lies on the watershed between the River Tees to the north-east and the River Lune to the south and reaches a maximum height of 481 metres (1,578 ft) above sea level about 1-kilometre (0.62 mi) north of the hamlet of Thringarth.

The northern flanks of the Fell fall just within the southern limit of the Upper Teesdale Site of Special Scientific Interest.

The Pennine Way National Trail skirts the south-eastern flank of the Fell.
