= The Harters =

American country music trio

- Also known as: SEVEN
- Origin: Arizona, U.S.
- Genres: Country
- Years active: 2005, 2009 – 2011
- Labels: Bigger Picture Music Group
- Past members: Leslie Harter; Michael Harter; Scott Harter

The Harters were an American country music trio based in Arizona. The group consisted of lead singer Leslie Harter and her brothers, Michael and Scott. The trio released its debut single, "Jenny," in early 2010 and charted with it on Billboard Hot Country Songs.

== Biography ==
Brothers Michael and Scott Harter, and their sister Leslie, were involved in various other musical endeavors before forming the band together. Michael had moved to Nashville to become a country songwriter/performer, recording one album for Broken Bow Records in 2002 under the name J. Michael Harter. Scott went to school in San Diego where he played in alternative rock bands. Leslie remained in Arizona where she decided at age 18 that she was going to pursue a career in music. In 2005, the Harters recorded one single, "Drunk Chick," under the name SEVEN, with David Malloy as producer.

After deciding that they would begin performing together, they began recording videos of themselves on YouTube. They were discovered by producer Keith Stegall, best known for his work as Alan Jackson's producer. The Harters also caught the attention of Adam Gregory, with whom they collaborated when the two acts shared the stage for a children's charity show. The band was subsequently asked to open a series of shows for Josh Turner. The Harters were also featured in People.com's July 2009 Photo Special.

The Harters made two songs available for free download on its website, including the debut single "Jenny." Scott and Michael began writing the song five years before its release, and completed it with assistance from Malloy and Brad Irby. This song debuted at number 54 on the Billboard Hot Country Songs charts dated for the week ending March 20, 2010 and peaked at number 53. The album's second single "If I Run" released to country radio in 2011. That same year, the trio toured with Alan Jackson.

== Critical reception ==
Karlie Justus of Engine 145 gave "If I Run" a "thumbs up", comparing Leslie's voice to that of Trisha Yearwood and praising the lyrics. Giving favorable singles to both singles, Bobby Peacock of Roughstock praised the "clever turns of phrase" and melody of "Jenny", and the "uncluttered" production of "If I Run". He compared the latter song to The Band Perry.

== Discography ==
=== Extended plays ===
Title	Album details
Family. Love. Harmony.	Release date: December 1, 2009; Label: Bigger Picture Music Group

=== Singles ===
Year	Single	Peak positions	Album
Year	Single	US Country	Album
2005	"Drunk Chicks" (as SEVEN)	—	—
2010	"Jenny"	53	Family. Love. Harmony.
2011	"If I Run"	51	Family. Love. Harmony.
"—" denotes releases that did not chart

=== Music videos ===
Year	Video	Director
2009	"Jenny"	Jon Grimson
2011	"If I Run"	Wes Edwards
