= Lizzie Sider =

American singer-songwriter

- Born: Elizabeth Sophia Sider
- Origin: Boca Raton, Florida, U.S.
- Genres: Country, pop
- Occupation: Singer-songwriter
- Instruments: Vocals, guitar, piano
- Years active: 2011–present
- Website: lizziesider.com

Elizabeth Sophia Sider is an American singer-songwriter.

== Music career ==
In June 2011, at the age of thirteen, Sider took one of her first trips to Nashville, Tennessee, to professionally write and record with Liz Rose, Keith and Adrienne Follese, Jamie O'Neal, Lisa Drew and Jimmy Murphy. It wasn't until Sider's next trip to Nashville, in October 2011, that she teamed up with Jamie O'Neal, Lisa Drew, and Jimmy Murphy for a second time, to write what would become Sider's first release, "Butterfly." That same October, Sider traveled to Kuttawa, Kentucky with her band to open for O'Neal. More recently, Sider has opened for Aaron Tippin and Gloriana.

Sider's debut single, "Butterfly", released in 2012 and peaked at No. 40 on the MusicRow chart and the official video of Sider recording the song in O'Neal's Nashville studio has over 1,000,000 views on YouTube.

In 2013, Sider's second single, "I Love You That Much", written and produced by Joe Vulpis, peaked at No. 37 on the MusicRow chart. The official music video was shot in Los Angeles by director Steven Goldmann.

Appearances include The Queen Latifah Show, Hallmark Channel's Home And Family Show, Access Hollywood, Entertainment Tonight, The Broadcast, Emotional Mojo, Daytime, The Better Show, Billboard, Time for Kids, and Country Weekly.

In late 2013, Sider created a bully prevention assembly for elementary and middle school students, that combines anti-bullying, positivity and encouragement, and music. In October 2013, Sider began her "Nobody Has The Power To Ruin Your Day" Tour, and in the 2013–2014 academic year, she toured 250 schools throughout the states of California, Florida, and Texas, and visited with over 100,000 students. The theme of the tour, "Nobody Has the Power to Ruin Your Day", comes from the words Sider's father spoke to her when she was struggling with the teasing and ridicule in her elementary school years. Every student on the tour receives a wristband with this phrase on it, and that message is a large part of the assembly. Sider fittingly created a non-profit organization called "Nobody Has the Power to Ruin Your Day Inc.", and donations can be made to help support Sider's anti-bullying efforts and tour.

In late 2014 Sider recorded her self-titled EP with producer James Stroud, which is scheduled to release in early 2015.

== Awards and honors ==
- CMA Artist to Watch (2013)
- HMMA (Hollywood Music in Media Award) for "Butterfly" (2013)
- Peter Yarrow HateBraker Award (2014)
- World Trust Foundation Featured Young Leader (2014)

== Discography ==
=== Extended plays ===
Title	Album details
Butterfly	Release date: June 3, 2012; Label: Lizzie Sider Music

=== Singles ===
Year	Single	Peak positions	Album
Year	Single	MusicRow Chart	Album
2012	"Butterfly"	40	Butterfly
2013	"I Love You That Much"	37	Butterfly

=== Music videos ===
Year	Video	Director
2012	"Butterfly"	Jimmy Murphy
2013	"I Love You That Much"	Steven Goldmann
