= Lenny Cooper =

American country rap singer-songwriter

- Born: 1988 (age 37–38); Jacksonville, North Carolina, U.S.
- Genres: Country rap
- Occupation: Singer-songwriter
- Instrument: Vocals
- Years active: 2012–present
- Labels: Average Joes Entertainment, Backroad
- Website: www.lennycoopermusic.com

Lenny Cooper (born 1988 in Jacksonville, North Carolina) is an American country rap singer-songwriter. Cooper is signed to Colt Ford's record label, Average Joes Entertainment, and released his debut album, Diesel Fuel, in 2012. Cooper's second album, Mud Dynasty, was released on May 7, 2013. It sold 3,000 copies in its first week of release, debuting at number 34 on the Billboard Top Country Albums chart and number 198 on the Billboard 200.

Cooper released his third album, The Grind, on August 26, 2014. The album features collaborations with Ford, Bucky Covington and Bubba Sparxxx. It sold 2,400 copies in its first week of release, debuting at number 17 on the Billboard Top Country Albums chart and number 142 on the Billboard 200.

== Discography ==
=== Albums ===
| Title | Album details | Peak chart positions | | | | |
| Title | Album details | US Country | US | US Heat | US Indie | US Rap |
|---|---|---|---|---|---|---|
| Diesel Fuel | Release date: February 7, 2012; Label: Backroad Records | 73 | — | 43 | — | — |
| Mud Dynasty | Release date: May 7, 2013; Label: Backroad Records | 34 | 198 | 4 | 34 | 17 |
| The Grind | Release date: August 26, 2014; Label: Backroad Records | 17 | 142 | 2 | 24 | 13 |
| Dirtified | Release date: October 28, 2016; Label: Backroad Records | 43 | — | 10 | 49 | 19 |
| Still the King | Release date: March 6, 2020; Label: Backroad Records | | | | | |
"—" denotes releases that did not chart

=== Singles ===
| Year | Single | Certifications | Album |
|---|---|---|---|
| 2011 | "Big Tires" | | Diesel Fuel |
| 2012 | "Mud Digger" (with Colt Ford) | RIAA: Gold | Diesel Fuel |
| 2012 | "Hillbilly Dance" | | Diesel Fuel |
| 2013 | "Mud Dynasty" | | Mud Dynasty |
| 2013 | "Rodeo" | | Mud Dynasty |
| 2014 | "Country Folks Anthem" (with Charlie Farley) | | Mud Dynasty |
| 2014 | "Lights On" | | The Grind |
| 2014 | "Redneck Country Song" (with Bucky Covington) | | The Grind |
| 2015 | "Duramax" (with Young Gunner) | | The Grind |
| 2015 | "54's" | | The Grind |
| 2015 | "She's So Country" | | The Grind |
| 2016 | "Keep It So Country" (with Young Gunner) | | Dirtified |
| 2017 | "Dirty Girl" | | Dirtified |
| 2017 | "Dirtified" | | Dirtified |
| 2018 | "Still the King" | | Still the King |
| 2019 | "Mud Fly" (with Beastmode) | | Still the King |
| 2020 | "Go Head" (with Long Cut) | | Still the King |

=== Music videos ===
| Year | Video | Director |
|---|---|---|
| 2011 | "Big Tires" | David Poag |
| 2013 | "Mud Dynasty" | Shannon Houchins |
| 2013 | "Rodeo" | Paul Cain |
| 2013 | "Country Folks Anthem" (with Charlie Farley) | |
| 2014 | "Lights On" | Paul Cain |
| 2014 | "She's So Country" | Gregory R. Alosio |
| 2015 | "Duramax" (with Young Gunner) | |
| 2015 | "Redneck Country Song" (with Bucky Covington) | |
| 2015 | "Outback (Extended Remix)" (with Moonshine Bandits, The Lacs, D. Thrash, Redneck Souljers, Bubba Sparxxx, Durwood Black, Demun Jones & Moccasin Creek) | |
| 2016 | "Keep It So Country" (with Young Gunner) | Michael Monaco |
| 2017 | "Dirty Girl" | |
| 2017 | "Dirtified" | |
| 2018 | "Still The King" | |
| 2019 | "Mud Fly" (with Beastmode) | Stephano Barberis |
| 2020 | "Go Head" (with Long Cut) | Roger Pistole |
