= Harter Nunatak =

Harter Nunatak (81°14′S 84°54′W) is a small, relatively isolated nunatak lying 4 nautical miles (7 km) northeast of Mount Tidd at the northeast side of the Pirrit Hills in Antarctica. It was mapped by the United States Geological Survey from surveys and U.S. Navy aerial photographs, 1958–61, and was named by the Advisory Committee on Antarctic Names for Gene L. Harter, a meteorologist at Little America V in 1957.
