= J. Michael Harter =

American singer-songwriter

- Born: James Michael Harter; January 7, 1979 (age 46)
- Origin: Phoenix, Arizona, United States
- Genres: Country
- Occupation: Singer-songwriter
- Instrument(s): Vocals, guitar
- Years active: 2002–present
- Labels: Broken Bow, Anozira (solo); Bigger Picture Music Group (in The Harters)
- Formerly of: The Harters

James Michael Harter (born January 7, 1979) is an American country music artist. Signed to the independent Broken Bow Records in 2002, Harter released his debut album Unexpected Change that year. It produced one single on the Billboard Hot Country Singles & Tracks (now Hot Country Songs) charts in "Hard Call to Make", which peaked at No. 45. Following its release, Harter founded his own label, Big Al, and later joined his sister and brother in a country trio called SEVEN (later the Harters).

== Biography ==
J. Michael Harter was born James Michael Harter. The middle child of five, he has two older sisters, a younger sister, and a younger brother. Harter was inspired at an early age by George Strait and Garth Brooks, and would spend hours alone in his room, teaching himself to play guitar along with their songs. While in high school, he wrote his first song, for his girlfriend.

Starting at age seventeen, Harter began performing locally in his native Phoenix, Arizona. By 1999, he had moved to Nashville, Tennessee in pursuit of a musical career, eventually meeting record producer Blake Mevis. Harter then signed to Broken Bow Records, then a newly established independent record label, in 2002. His debut single, "Hard Call to Make", spent sixteen weeks on the Billboard Hot Country Singles & Tracks (now Hot Country Songs) charts, peaking at No. 45. It was the only chart single from his debut album Unexpected Change (2002). The song was a ballad in which the narrator describes the choices he had to make in life. Unexpected Change received a favorable review from About.com critic Jolene Downs, who said that although Harter did not look like a country singer, the songs showcased his singing and songwriting talents well.

Harter later exited Broken Bow's roster after the release of his album, and by 2004 he had formed another label called Big Al, in association with the Lofton Creek Records label. A year later, he joined his sister Leslie and brother Scott to form a country music trio called SEVEN. They released a single entitled "Drunk Chicks" in 2005. The trio, renamed The Harters, resumed recording in 2009 under the production of Keith Stegall.

== Discography ==
=== Unexpected Change (2002) ===
Unexpected Change

Studio album by J. Michael Harter
- Released: August 27, 2002
- Genre: Country
- Label: Broken Bow
- Producer: Blake Mevis

1. "If You Never Loved Me" (Marv Green, Bill Luther) – 3:16
2. "Hard Call to Make" (Steve Seskin, Mark Alan Springer) – 3:33
3. "Sugar and Gasoline" (Josh Kear, Aimee Mayo, Chris Lindsey) – 3:30
4. "On My Way Home" (Joe Doyle, Chris Tompkins) – 4:00
5. "Everything in Arizona" (J. Michael Harter) – 3:30
6. "Who You're Lovin' Now" (Trey Bruce, Tim Johnson) – 4:02
7. "You're in the Right Place" (Shane Teeters, Kerry Kurt Phillips) – 4:07
8. "Losing You" (Monty Criswell, Tom Schoepf) – 3:06
9. "Somewhere in California" (Harter, Tompkins, Kent Blazy) – 3:38
10. "The First Time" (Harter) – 3:49

=== Extended plays ===
| Title | Album details |
|---|---|
| Ride On | Release date: September 30, 2014; Label: GMV Nashville/Anozira Records |

=== Singles ===
| Year | Single | Peak positions | Album |
| Year | Single | US Country | Album |
|---|---|---|---|
| 2002 | "Hard Call to Make" | 45 | Unexpected Change |
| 2014 | "Holy Cowgirl" | — | Ride On |
| 2015 | "Playing With Fire" | — | Playing With Fire – Single |
"—" denotes releases that did not chart
