= Jawga Boyz =

American rap group

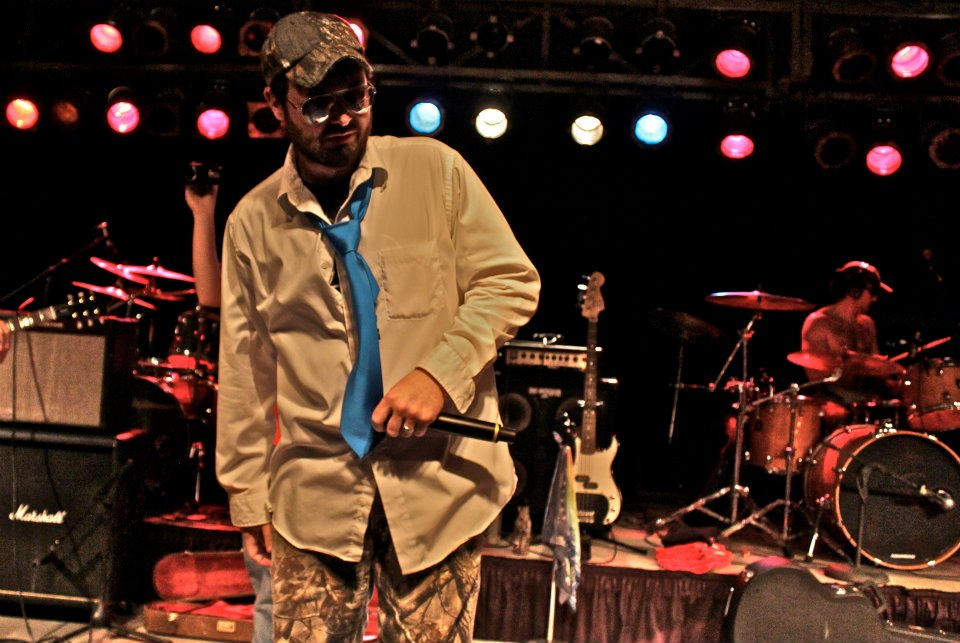
- D. Thrash of Jawga Boyz performing in 2012

Background information
- Origin: Athens, Georgia
- Genres: Country rap
- Years active: 2003–present
- Label: D. Thrash Productions
- Members: Derek "D. Thrash" Thrasher; A.J. "BoonDock" McIntyre; Mark "Cornbread" Bryant; Dez; Chris Hood; Rich "Sloppy Jones" Williamson; Doyle "Dreadneck" Williams

Jawga Boyz is an American country rap group formed in Athens, Georgia in 2003. The current lineup is D. Thrash, BoonDock, Cornbread, Dez, Chris Hood, Sloppy Jones, and Dreadneck. They have released four studio albums including 2014's Tailgate Music, which debuted at number 155 on the Billboard 200, number 22 on the Country Albums chart and number 17 on the Rap Albums chart. Steve Leggett of AllMusic gave Tailgate Music a favorable review, writing that it "keeps the fun and quality up, showing once again what this Dirty South hip-hop country rock thing is all about, and doing it all with engaging energy and intensity.

In 2013, Thrasher wrote and recorded a song with Joe Diffie, "Girl Ridin' Shotgun". In response to Jason Aldean's song "1994". Their song "Chillin in the Backwoods" featuring Young Gunner currently has over 100 million views on YouTube. It also features known country rap guitarist, Matt "Manchild" Marshall on guitar.

== Discography ==
=== Albums ===
| Title | Album details | Peak chart positions | | | | |
| Title | Album details | US Country | US Rap | US | US Heat | US Indie |
|---|---|---|---|---|---|---|
| Kuntry | Release date: May 17, 2011; Label: D. Thrash Productions | — | — | — | — | — |
| Hick Hop 101 | Release date: August 28, 2012; Label: D. Thrash Productions | — | — | — | — | — |
| Reloaded 1 | Release date: December 3, 2013; Label: D. Thrash Productions | — | 25 | — | 7 | — |
| Tailgate Music (Jawga Boyz & Dez) | Release date: October 21, 2014; Label: D. Thrash Productions | 22 | 17 | 155 | 4 | 28 |
"—" denotes releases that did not chart
