= Redneck Souljers =

American country rap duo

- Also known as: Tiller Gang
- Origin: Winchester, Tennessee, U.S.
- Genres: Country rap
- Years active: 2009–present
- Label: Play Make Believe
- Members: Wesley "Fatt Tarr" Alonso; Christopher "C-Hubb" Walls

Redneck Souljers are an American country rap duo from Winchester, Tennessee, composed of rappers Wesley "Fatt Tarr" Alonso and Christopher "C-Hubb" Walls. They were formed in 2009 as a novelty act, parodying popular hits and remixing songs in a hick-hop style, then in 2013 they went "serious" with their debut Tiller Gang release. Their first full-length studio album, Firewater, debuted on the Billboard charts.

== Discography ==
Studio albums

List of studio albums, with selected chart positions
Title	Album details	Peak chart positions			
Title	Album details	US Country	US Rap	US Indie	US Heat.
Firewater	Released: November 6, 2015; Label: Play Make Believe, LLC	42	19	37	8
"—" denotes a recording that did not chart.

Extended plays

List of extended plays with selected chart positions
Title	Details
Tiller Gang	Released: November 5, 2013; Label: Play Make Believe, LLC
The River	Released: June 1, 2018; Label: Redneck Souljers
