= Country rap =

Music genre

- Other names: Country hip-hop; hick-hop; country hick-hop
- Stylistic origins: Country; hip-hop; Southern hip-hop
- Cultural origins: Late 1990s, United States (South, South Central)

Other topics
- Alternative hip-hop; rap rock

Country rap (also called country hip-hop, country hick-hop, redneck rap and sometimes hick-hop) is a fusion genre that mixes country music elements with hip-hop beats and rapping.

== History ==
=== Prototypes ===
Early influences on the emergence of country rap as a distinct genre include talking blues like "Big Bad John" (1961) by Jimmy Dean, "A Boy Named Sue" (1969) by Johnny Cash, the 1971 cover of "Hot Rod Lincoln" by Commander Cody and His Lost Planet Airmen, "Convoy" (1975) by C.W. McCall and "Uneasy Rider" (1975) and "The Devil Went Down to Georgia" (1979), both by Charlie Daniels. Black artists' works that may have been influential in the genre's development include Jamaican ska artist Prince Buster's "Texas Hold-Up" (1964), "Lil Ole Country Boy" (1970) by Parliament, and "Black Grass" (1972) by Bad Bascomb. Music journalist Chuck Eddy traces the genre's roots back to Woody Guthrie.

Blowfly's single "Blowfly's Rapp" (1980) drew on the influence of earlier country musicians like Charlie Daniels and C. W. McCall; NPR said the song is a "Deliverance-style encounter with Ku Klux Klan-accredited truck drivers to light funkbacking". Spin Magazine said Trickeration's "Western Gangster Town" (1980) (released four years before Schoolly D's "Gangster Boogie") is "cowboy rap's Rosetta stone, and probably the first 'gangster' rap". Other early examples of country rap are Sir Mix-a-Lot's "Square Dance Rap" (1985) where he raps in the voice of a "white country boy". The lyric "From L.A. to Carolina / Drop them suckers in Aunt Jemima" in Sir Mix-a-Lot's "Buttermilk Biscuits" (1988) is a reference to what many consider a racial stereotype, trademarked after Chris L. Rutt heard a performance of the minstrel song "Old Aunt Jemima" (1876).

The song "Rappin' Duke" (1985) is a parody of western film star John Wayne: "Two hundred punks, well, what you gonna do? / I got two six-shooters that'll see me through". The song also contains a reference to "Old Folks at Home" (1851). The genre-blending was not limited only to hip-hop artists; country duo Bellamy Brothers released "Country Rap" (1987) with lyrics about soul food, church, turnip greens and black-eyed peas.

UGK became pioneers of the hardcore Southern rap style that emerged after the success of the Geto Boys, which they started to call "country rap". At the end of "Let Me See It", Pimp C raps: "This ain't no muthafuckin' hip-hop records, these country rap tunes", originally a response to Northern hip-hop artists who had criticized Southern rap for not being "real hip-hop". The name of the song "Hay" (1996) by Crucial Conflict is a reference to marijuana.

=== 1998–present: Emergence ===
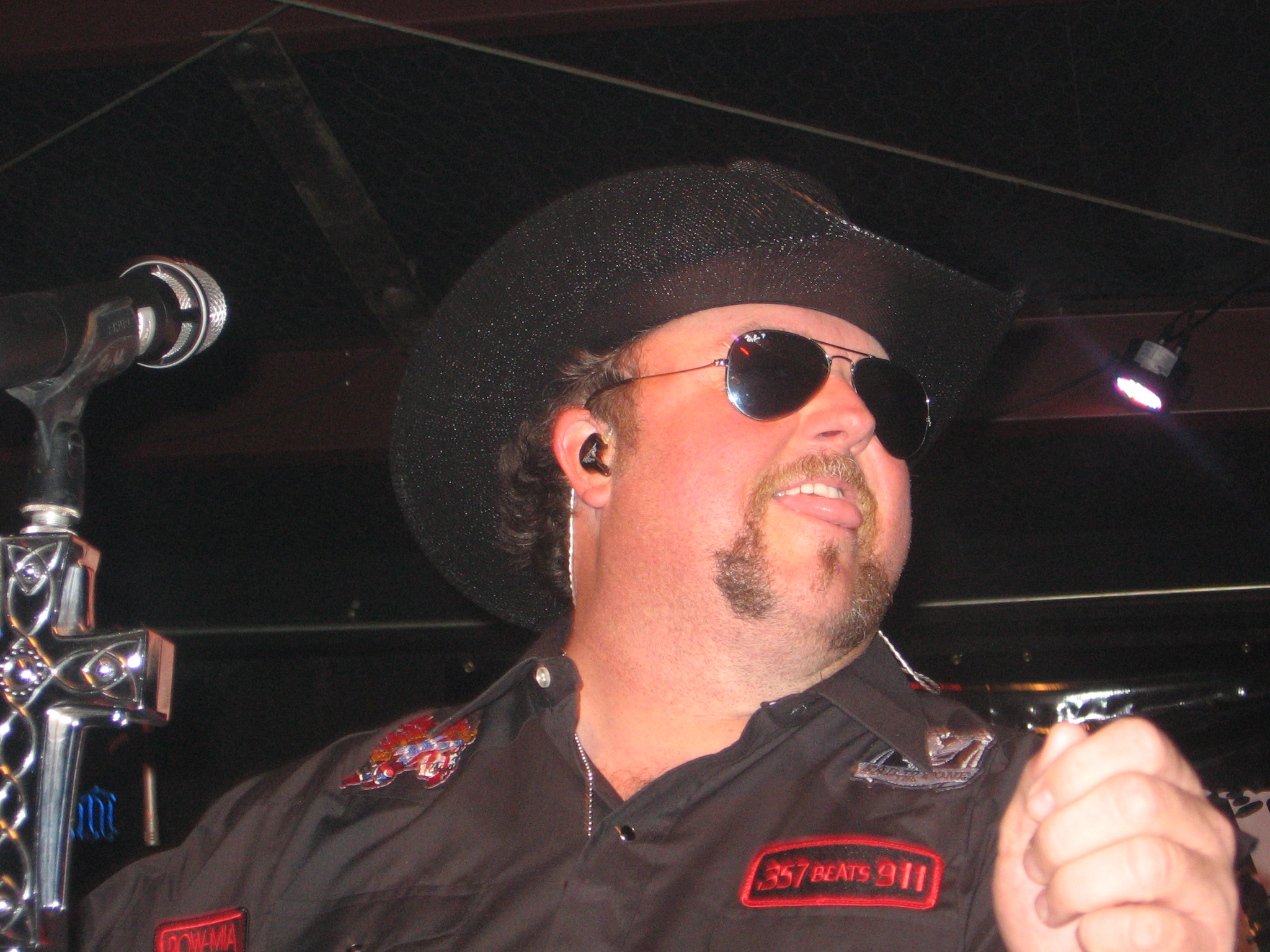
Colt Ford, the first artist to reach #1 on both the Billboard Country Albums and Rap Albums charts

Kid Rock's "Cowboy", released in 1999, reflects a cross-section of Kid Rock's country music, Southern rock and hip-hop influences, even quoting a piano riff from the Doors song "L.A. Woman". Kid Rock has described the song as a cross between Run DMC and Lynyrd Skynyrd. Kid Rock's former DJ, Uncle Kracker, was another pioneer of country rap in his solo career.

In the early 2000s, producer Shannon "Fat Shan" Houchins and Bubba Sparxxx released Sparxxx's 2001 debut album Dark Days, Bright Nights as an independent release. The blend of country and trap caught the attention of producer Jimmy Iovine who re-released the album on Interscope. Houchins soon after created Average Joes Entertainment with Colt Ford. With songs like "No Trash in My Trailer" (2008) and "Drivin' Around Song" (2013), Ford has sold over one million albums.

In 2003, UK artist Eminemmylou coined the term "hip hopry" and produced a "hip hopry" version of Eminem's "The Way I Am" and 50 Cent's "P.I.M.P." (subtitled "Limp Version"), adding banjo and country instrumentation to the rap hits as well as writing her own songs such as "When Gram Met Eminem" about "creating a brand new sound" on her country rap album Muthabanjo. A sole proponent of country rap in the UK at the time, Eminemmylou performed at the International Country Hip Hop Festival in New York in March 2006 alongside Rench and other US country rap bands at the venue Southpaw, Brooklyn.

The trend continued in 2005 when country music stars Big & Rich introduced Cowboy Troy and his album Loco Motive. Troy has said he uses "country instrumentation" that includes a banjo, fiddle, and acoustic guitar blended with "shredding rock guitar riffs and a rap delivery". Hal Crowther has written that "I Play Chicken with the Train" (2006) by Cowboy Troy was "scandalous not because it mixes 'black' rap with 'white' country, but because, through the sheer force of unlikely-but-seamless juxtaposition, it forces us to acknowledge that those two musical styles, at least when they whoop it up, are brothers under the skin".

In the late 2010s, country rap returned to prominence as part of the "Yee Haw" movement, a trend characterized by hip-hop producers incorporating country music into their own recordings. Young Thug's 2017 song "Family Don't Matter" is credited with popularizing the movement. Artists within "Yee Haw" include Lil Tracy and DaBaby. Other country rap artists include Ryan Upchurch, Jawga Boyz, Bottleneck, Moonshine Bandits and Big Smo. Cowboy Troy, Lenny Cooper and The Lacs were three of the top country rap artists of 2013 each with an album on Billboard's Country Chart. Also in the 2010s, hip-hop influences were widely noted in mainstream country songs especially in the bro-country genre.

In 2020, Niko Moon's "Good Time" peaked at number 20 on the Hot 100 – with the track being a hip-hop song with country influence, or vice versa. The same year, country singer Billy Ray Cyrus released a heavily rap-inspired country song from his Mama Kush project titled “Ballad of Jed,” while also world-premiering an animated music video, which debuted on Weedmaps in celebration of 4/20. In 2024 Beyoncé's eight studio album Cowboy Carter experimenting country music with hip-hop, R&B and soul sounds.

=== Country trap ===
In 2019, rapper Lil Nas X's "country trap" single "Old Town Road" achieved mainstream international success. Assisted by several subsequent versions, including a remix featuring Billy Ray Cyrus, the song broke multiple U.S. streaming records and charted at number one on the Billboard Hot 100 for a record nineteen weeks. In June 2019, Blanco Brown's "The Git Up", also described by USA Today as a "trap-country" song, also achieved viral success. Other notable country trap songs include "Rodeo" by Lil Nas X and Cardi B, "Rascal" by RMR and "Home" by BigXthaPlug and Shaboozey.

== Collaborations ==
The Mo Thugs Family single "Ghetto Cowboy" (1998) is noted for featuring a harmonica. Rolling Stone said of "Cruise (Remix)" (2012) by Florida Georgia Line featuring Nelly, that the track "ushered in the wave of escapist fantasies set to syncopated drum loops that became known as 'bro country'. Florida Georgia Line has said that Nelly's part "just connected", helping to make the "Cruise" remix which was produced and conceptualized by veteran producer, Jason Nevins, reach the No. 1 and No. 4 positions on the Billboard Hot Country Songs and Hot 100 charts respectively; it also became the first country single to ever gain a RIAA diamond certification.

B.o.B and pop singer Taylor Swift collaborated on "Both of Us" (2012). The track features Swift's country vocals and a blend of hip-hop with banjos. It became a top 10 hit in Australia and New Zealand and a top 20 hit in the US.

Country singer Brad Paisley and rapper LL Cool J recorded the controversial song "Accidental Racist" for Paisley's 2013 album Wheelhouse.

Other collaborations include "Po' Folks" (2002) by Nappy Roots with Anthony Hamilton, "Country Folks" (2012) by Bubba Sparxxx featuring Colt Ford & Danny Boone, "Dirt Road Anthem" (remix) by Jason Aldean and Ludacris, and "Try Harder Than That" by Meghan Linsey with Bubba Sparxxx (2014).

== Popularity ==
Physical sales of country rap albums are higher in more rural areas where country rap fans do not have the Internet services required to stream or download music. There are numerous country rap festivals where artists gather to play their music for upwards of 7,000 fans.

== Politics ==
The term "hick-hop" is often criticized by some southern artists, with Struggle Jennings saying, "I love the country, I love the South, I've been fishing and hunting, but I'm not a hick. I'm not hick-hop". The political ideology of country rap artists is perceived as being right-wing or conservative, due to some right-leaning politics expressed by artists like Upchurch and Forgiato Blow; however the political ideology of country rap artists ranges the full spectrum of political beliefs.
