= Bigger Picture Music Group =

American record label

- Founded: 2008
- Founder: Bob Ezrin, Keith Stegall, William Hein
- Defunct: 2014
- Status: Defunct
- Distributor(s): Topspin, Atlantic, Universal Music Canada
- Genre: Country
- Country of origin: U.S.
- Location: Nashville, Tennessee
- Official website: biggerpicturegroup.com

Bigger Picture Music Group, formerly Big Picture Music Group, was an independent record label based in Nashville, Tennessee founded in 2008. It is distributed by Atlantic Records in the US. Their main focus is in country music. Their artist roster included such artists as Chris Cagle, Craig Campbell, Alice Cooper, The Harters, Christian Kane, and Zac Brown Band.

== Former artists ==
- Chelsea Bain
- Blackjack Billy
- Rachel Bradshaw
- Chris Cagle
- Craig Campbell
- The Harters
- Chris Janson
- Ryan Kinder
- Smithfield
- D. Vincent Williams

=== Former service clients ===
- Paul Brandt
- Sonia Leigh
- Alice Cooper
- Uncle Kracker
- Ronnie Milsap
- Zac Brown Band
