= Average Joes Entertainment =

American record label

- Founded: 2008
- Founder: Colt Ford, Shannon Houchins
- Distributors: Average Joe's Ent. Group, LLC
- Genre: Country; alternative country; country rap
- Country of origin: U.S.
- Location: Nashville, Tennessee
- Official website: www.averagejoesent.com

Average Joes Entertainment Group is an American record label specializing in alternative country, country rap and country music. The label was founded in 2008 by country rap artist Jason "Colt Ford" Brown and producer Shannon Houchins.

Ford has released six studio albums for the label, five of which have reached the top 10 of the country albums charts including 2012's chart topping #1 "Declaration Of Independence" which also charted at #2 on the rap albums chart. 2014's "Thanks For Listening" charted #1 on the rap albums chart and # 2 on the country albums chart.

Average Joes is also responsible for launching the careers of other artists such as Brantley Gilbert, LoCash Cowboys, Tyler Farr, The Lacs and many more.

The label's audiences attract a sizable, rural and working-class audience by describing features of modern rural life in proud detail, staging concerts at mud bogs and buying a stake in the mud racing Mega Truck Series.

Average Joe's roster also includes Montgomery Gentry, Lenny Cooper, Bubba Sparxxx, Cypress Spring and more. Other previous notable artists include Rehab, Corey Smith, Sunny Ledfurd, Josh Gracin, Moonshine Bandits, Kevin Fowler and Demun Jones.

== History ==
Average Joes Entertainment was formed in 2006 by CEO Shannon Houchins, country-music artist Colt Ford and restaurateur Zach McLeroy. AJE released its first album, Colt Ford's "Ride Through The Country" on July 4, 2008 which quickly brought notoriety to the new label. Soon after Average Joes artist roster added such acts as Brantley Gilbert, Corey Smith, Montgomery Gentry and Locash.

In 2010, Backroad Records was formed as a subsidiary of Average Joe's, specializing in country rap. Its roster features The Lacs, Lenny Cooper, Bubba Sparxxx, Danny Boone from Rehab, Demun Jones from Rehab, Moonshine Bandits, Charlie Farley, Redneck Social Club and Twang & Round.

Backroad also releases an annual compilation series titled "Mud Digger". Volume 1 was released on August 3, 2010 and features songs from Average Joe's Entertainment and Backroads Records artists such as Colt Ford, Brantley Gilbert, The Lacs, Corey Smith and Sunny Ledfurd. Backroad as since released ten volumes of the popular title.

In addition to country music, Average Joe's founded a southern urban genre-oriented subsidiary imprint called AVJ Records, specializing in southern rock, pop, R&B and hip hop artists, including Nappy Roots, Anamul House and Rehab.

In 2014, AVJ was also converted into a country-rap brand. Rehab was the only previous artist that remained on AVJ. A minor re-alignment also took place at this time moving Demun Jones and new artist Sarah Ross to the Average Joes brand and Danny Boone and Twang & Round to AVJ.

== Marketing ==
In the early days of Average Joes, the company used unique practices what they referred to as "hi-tech/low-tech" marketing, where they leaned on both digital "direct to fan" social marketing along with face-to-face integrations tied in with artist's tours. Many of their early tours were in non-traditional small market venues that mostly included mud bogs and parks.

Through this practice the company built massive direct to fan data bases.

== Management ==
Average Joes Entertainment also formed a management arm that started in 2009 under the name Fullscope and was originally steered by Ken Madson. In 2011, Fullscope was re-branded as Average Joes Management and in 2019 rebranded as Arcade Management. Arcade is currently headed by Jamie Reeder. Past and current management clients include Colt Ford, Brantley Gilbert, The Lacs, Tyler Farr, John Michael Montgomery, Sister Hazel, Gaelic Storm, Josh Gracin, Nappy Roots, Bubba Sparxxx and more.

== Film and television ==
In 2011, Average Joes formed Hideout Pictures to focus on film and television. Recent projects include CMT's Still The King starring Billy Ray Cyrus, Joey Lauren Adams and Madison Iseman, Jay and Silent Bob Reboot directed by Kevin Smith, 3022 starring Kate Walsh, Omar Epps and Miranda Cosgrove and more.

== Other subsidiaries ==
AJE also owns motor-sports league Mega Truck Series and clothing line Slinger.

== Label roster ==
=== Artists on Average Joes Ent. ===
- Bryan Martin
- Devin Burris
- Tommy Chayne
- Lenny Cooper
- Cypress Spring
- Colt Ford
- Sam Grow
- Jeremy McComb
- Montgomery Gentry
- Sarah Ross
- Smo
- Bubba Sparxxx
- Adam Wakefield
- Carter Winter

== ALUMNI ==
=== Average Joes Imprint ===
- Brantley Gilbert
- Cap Bailey
- Corey Smith
- Daniel Lee
- Demun Jones
- Ira Dean
- JB and the Moonshine Band
- JJ Lawhorn
- Josh Gracin
- Kevin Fowler
- Lauren Briant
- LoCash Cowboys
- Matt Stillwell
- Rachel Farley
- Rich O'Toole
- Sunny Ledfurd
- Trailer Choir

=== Backroad Imprint ===
- Charlie Farley
- The Lacs
- Moccasin Creek
- Moonshine Bandits
- Redneck Social Club
- T Woods
- Twang & Round

=== AVJ Records Imprint ===
- Anamul House
- Bingx
- Bizarre
- Crucifix
- Danny Boone
- DJ KO
- Exit 24
- I4NI
- J Rosevelt
- Lindsey Hager
- Nappy Roots
- Rehab
- Rizzi Myers
- Space Capone
- Vonnegutt
