= Chase Rice discography =

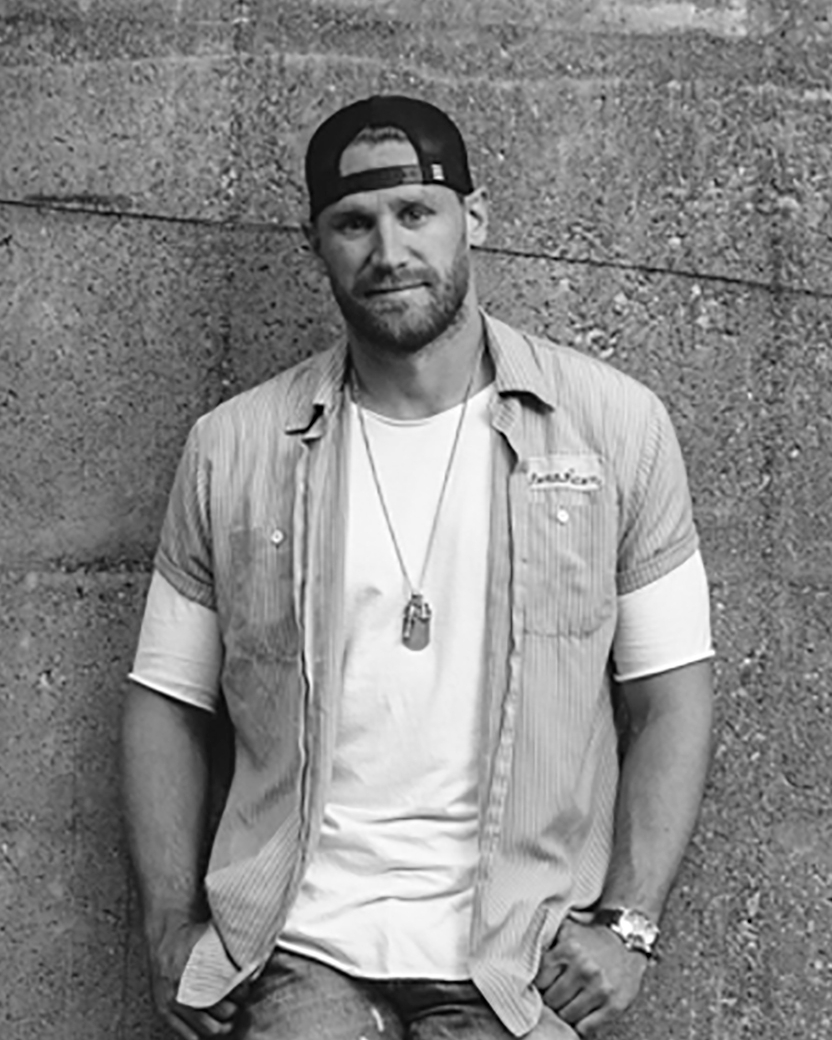
- Rice in 2016
- Studio albums: 6
- EPs: 4
- Singles: 13
- Music videos: 14
- Other charted songs: 5
- No. 1 singles: 2

American country music singer and songwriter Chase Rice has released six studio albums, four extended plays, and thirteen singles. After a number of independent releases, Rice signed to Columbia Records Nashville in 2014 and recorded his breakthrough album Ignite the Night. This album was certified platinum by the Recording Industry Association of America (RIAA); it also produced the singles "Ready Set Roll" and "Gonna Wanna Tonight", which were top-ten hits on the Billboard Hot Country Songs and Country Airplay charts.

After exiting Columbia Nashville, Rice signed to Broken Bow Records (now known as BBR Music Group), for whom he released two more albums: Lambs & Lions in 2017 and The Album three years later. The former accounted for the single "Eyes on You", his first number-one single on Country Airplay. The Album produced another number-one single on that chart with "Drinkin' Beer. Talkin' God. Amen.", a collaboration with Florida Georgia Line.

== Studio albums ==
Title	Album details	Peak chart positions						Sales	Certifications
Title	Album details	US Country	US	US Heat	US Indie	AUS	CAN	Sales	Certifications
Friday Nights and Sunday Mornings	Release date: September 2010; Label: Self-released; Formats: CD, digital download	—	—	—	—	—	—		
Dirt Road Communion	Release date: March 20, 2012; Label: Dack Janiels; Formats: CD, digital download	48	—	15	—	—	—		
Ignite the Night	Release date: August 19, 2014; Label: Columbia Nashville, Dack Janiels; Formats: CD, digital download	1	3	—	1	23	7	US: 305,300	RIAA: Platinum
Lambs & Lions	Release date: November 17, 2017; Label: Broken Bow, Dack Janiels; Formats: CD, LP, digital download	3	42	—	—	98	—	US: 26,900	RIAA: Gold
The Album	Release date: May 28, 2021 (Note: "The Album" was originally released on May 28, 2021 as digital-download-only. It was released to CD on October 1, 2021.); Label: Broken Bow, Dack Janiels; Formats: CD, digital download	34	—	—	34	—	—		
I Hate Cowboys & All Dogs Go to Hell	Released: February 10, 2023; Label: Broken Bow, Dack Janiels; Formats: CD, digital download	36	—	—	—	—	—		
Go Down Singin	Released: September 24, 2024; Label: Broken Bow, Dack Janiels; Formats: CD, digital download	—	—	—	—	—	—		
"—" denotes releases that did not chart

== Extended plays ==
Title	EP details	Peak chart positions				Sales
Title	EP details	US Country	US	US Indie	CAN	Sales
Country as Me	Release date: March 8, 2011; Label: Artist Revolution	—	—	—	—	
Ready Set Roll	Release date: October 15, 2013; Label: Dack Janiels	4	16	2	23	
The Album, Pt. I	Release date: January 24, 2020; Label: Dack Janiels / Broken Bow	6	60	5	77	US: 5,600
The Album, Pt. II	Release date: May 15, 2020; Label: Dack Janiels / Broken Bow	—	—	—	—	
"—" denotes releases that did not chart

== Singles ==
Year	Single	Peak chart positions					Certifications (sales threshold)	Album
Year	Single	US Hot Country	US Country Airplay	US	CAN Country	CAN	Certifications (sales threshold)	Album
2010	"Buzz Back"	—	—	—	—	—		Country as Me
2011	"Girls of the SEC"	—	—	—	—	—		—N/a
2012	"Only a Country Girl"	—	—	—	—	—		Dirt Road Communion
2013	"Ready Set Roll"	5	5	54	29	40	RIAA: 2× Platinum	Ignite the Night
2014	"Gonna Wanna Tonight"	10	2	67	16	—	RIAA: Platinum	Ignite the Night
2016	"Whisper"	17	56	94	—	— (Note: "Whisper" did not enter the Billboard Canadian Hot 100, but peaked at number 46 on the Canadian Digital Song Sales component chart.)		—N/a
2016	"Everybody We Know Does"	26	42	— (Note: "Everybody We Know Does" did not enter the Billboard Hot 100, but peaked at number 20 on the Bubbling Under Hot 100 chart.)	—	—		—N/a
2017	"Three Chords & the Truth"	34	25	—	—	—		Lambs & Lions
2018	"Eyes on You"	3	1	38	10	73	RIAA: 3× Platinum; MC: Gold; RMNZ: Gold	Lambs & Lions
2019	"Lonely If You Are"	19	12	91	43	—	RIAA: Platinum; MC: Gold	The Album
2020	"Drinkin' Beer. Talkin' God. Amen." (featuring Florida Georgia Line)	3	1	24	1	62	RIAA: Platinum	The Album
2021	"If I Were Rock & Roll"	—	46	—	—	—		I Hate Cowboys & All Dogs Go to Hell
2023	"Bad Day to Be a Cold Beer"	—	52	—	—	—		I Hate Cowboys & All Dogs Go to Hell
"—" denotes releases that did not chart

== Other singles ==
=== Guest singles ===
Year	Single	Artist	Peak positions	Album
Year	Single	Artist	US Hot Country	Album
2014	"The High Life"	Colt Ford	38	Thanks for Listening

=== Other charted songs ===
Year	Single	Peak chart positions			Certifications (sales threshold)	Album
Year	Single	US Hot Country	US Country Airplay	CAN	Certifications (sales threshold)	Album
2014	“We Goin’ Out”	36	—	—		Ignite the Night
2014	“Ride”	38	—	—	RIAA: Platinum	Ignite the Night
2014	"Do It Like This"	40	—	—		Ignite the Night
2014	"How She Rolls"	—	55	—		Ignite the Night
2014	"Beer with the Boys"	—	—	90		Ignite the Night
"—" denotes releases that did not chart

== Music videos ==
Year	Video	Director	Ref.
2011	"Buzz Back"	Carl Diebold	
2014	"Ready Set Roll"	Jeff Ray	
2014	"The High Life" (with Colt Ford)	Scott Hansen	
2015	"Gonna Wanna Tonight"	Jeff Venable	
2015	"Ride" (with Macy Maloy)	Joseph Llanes	
2016	"Everybody We Know Does"	Cody Cannon	
2017	"Three Chords & the Truth"	Brian Lazzaro	
2017	"If I’m Bein’ Honest"	Cody Cannon	
2018	"Amen"	Cody Cannon	
2018	"Eyes on You"	Brian Lazzaro	
2019	"On Tonight" (UK Edition)	Cody Cannon	
2019	"This Cowboy's Hat" (feat. Ned LeDoux)"	Cody Cannon	
2020	"Lonely If You Are"	Reid Long	
2021	"Drinkin Beer. Talkin' God. Amen." (with Florida Georgia Line)	TK McKamy	
