= Chris LeDoux discography =

- Studio albums: 28
- Live albums: 1
- Compilation albums: 13
- Singles: 33
- Music videos: 7
- Collaborations: 2

Chris LeDoux was a rodeo cowboy who sang and recorded songs in his spare time and sold his albums from the back of his truck. With his father, he started his own record label, American Cowboy Songs, in 1970. Under that label he released 22 albums between 1971 and 1990. After gaining recognition from the 1989 Garth Brooks song, "Much Too Young (To Feel This Damn Old)" he was signed to Liberty Records, where he released 4 studio albums in four years. He released 6 more albums including a live album under Capitol Records. Horsepower in 2003 was his last studio album before his death in 2005. Nine official compilation albums have been released between 1994 and 2008. 20 Greatest Hits has been certified platinum by the RIAA.

LeDoux has released a total of 33 singles, most of them from his major label albums. While most of his singles failed to chart or missed the top 40, his most famous song is the duet with Garth Brooks, "Whatcha Gonna Do with a Cowboy" which charted at #7 on Billboard's Hot Country Songs chart. The follow-up single, "Cadillac Ranch" reached #18.

== Studio albums ==
=== 1970s ===
Title	Details
Songs of Rodeo Life	Release date: 1971; Label: self-released
Rodeo Songs "Old & New"	Release date: 1973; Label: self-released
Songs of Rodeo and Country	Release date: 1974; Label: self-released
Rodeo and Living Free	Release date: 1975; Label: self-released
Life as a Rodeo Man	Release date: 1975; Label: self-released
Songbook of the American West	Release date: 1976; Label: self-released
Sing Me a Song Mr. Rodeo Man	Release date: 1977; Label: self-released
Cowboys Ain't Easy to Love	Release date: 1978; Label: self-released
Paint Me Back Home in Wyoming	Release date: 1978; Label: self-released
Western Tunesmith	Release date: 1979; Label: self-released

=== 1980s ===
Title	Details
Old Cowboy Heroes	Release date: 1980; Label: self-released
He Rides the Wild Horses	Release date: 1981; Label: self-released
Used to Want to Be a Cowboy	Release date: 1982; Label: self-released
Old Cowboy Classics	Release date: 1983; Label: self-released
Thirty Dollar Cowboy	Release date: 1983; Label: self-released
Melodies and Memories	Release date: 1984; Label: self-released
Wild and Wooly	Release date: 1986; Label: self-released
Chris LeDoux and the Saddle Boogie Band	Release date: 1988; Label: self-released
Powder River	Release date: 1989; Label: self-released

=== 1990s ===
Title	Details	Peak chart positions		Certifications (sales thresholds)
Title	Details	US Country	US	Certifications (sales thresholds)
Western Underground^{[A]}	Release date: July 22, 1991; Label: Liberty Records	36	—	
Whatcha Gonna Do with a Cowboy	Release date: July 20, 1992; Label: Liberty Records	9	65	RIAA: Gold
Under This Old Hat	Release date: July 5, 1993; Label: Liberty Records	21	131	
Haywire	Release date: September 6, 1994; Label: Liberty Records	17	128	
Stampede	Release date: March 19, 1996; Label: Capitol Nashville	33	—	
One Road Man	Release date: July 14, 1998; Label: Capitol Nashville	24	180	
"—" denotes releases that did not chart

=== 2000s ===
Title	Details	Peak chart positions	
Title	Details	US Country	US
Cowboy	Release date: August 1, 2000; Label: Capitol Nashville	17	134
After the Storm	Release date: April 9, 2002; Label: Capitol Nashville	14	121
Horsepower	Release date: July 22, 2003; Label: Capitol Nashville	24	162

== Compilation albums ==
Title	Details	Peak chart positions		Certifications
Title	Details	US Country	US	Certifications
Sounds of the Western Country	Release date: 1980; Label: self-released	—	—	
Gold Buckle Dreams	Release date: 1987; Label: self-released	—	—	
Radio and Rodeo Hits	Release date: 1990; Label: self-released	—	—	
Best of Chris LeDoux	Release date: March 8, 1994; Label: Liberty Records	51	—	RIAA: Gold
American Cowboy	Release date: November 1, 1994; Label: Liberty Records	—	—	
Rodeo Rock and Roll Collection	Release date: August 15, 1995; Label: Capitol Nashville	—	—	
20 Greatest Hits	Release date: June 8, 1999; Label: Capitol Nashville	17	145	RIAA: Platinum
The Capitol Collection (1990-2000)	Release date: June 4, 2002; Label: Capitol Nashville	63	—	
20 Originals: The Early Years	Release date: June 15, 2004; Label: Capitol Nashville	58	—	
Anthology, Volume 1	Release date: August 16, 2005; Label: Capitol Nashville	20	126	
The Ultimate Collection	Release date: October 3, 2006; Label: Capitol Nashville	33	—	
Classic Chris LeDoux	Release date: April 29, 2008; Label: Capitol Nashville	26	175	
Icon	Release date: 2013; Label: Capitol Nashville	—	—	
"—" denotes releases that did not chart

== Live albums ==
Title	Details	Peak chart positions
Title	Details	US Country
Live	Release date: June 17, 1997; Label: Capitol Nashville	26

== Singles ==
=== 1970s and 1980s ===
Year	Single	Peak positions	Album
Year	Single	US Country	Album
1979	"Lean, Mean and Hungry"	99	Paint Me Back Home in Wyoming
1979	"Caballo Diablo"	98	Life as a Rodeo Man
1980	"Ten Seconds in the Saddle"	96	Western Tunesmith
1980	"Buckin' Machine"	—	Rodeo & Living Free
1982	"I Used to Want to Be a Cowboy"	—	Used to Want to Be a Cowboy
1984	"Even Cowboys Like a Little Rock and Roll"	—	Melodies and Memories
1987	"It Ain't the Years, It's the Miles"	—	Gold Buckle Dreams
1989	"Sons of the Pioneers"	—	Powder River
"—" denotes releases that did not chart

=== 1990s ===
Year	Single	Peak chart positions		Certifications	Album
Year	Single	US Country	CAN Country	Certifications	Album
1990	"Wild and Wooly"	—^{A}	—		Radio & Rodeo Hits
1990	"Riding for a Fall"	—	—		—N/a
1991	"This Cowboy's Hat"	63	—	RIAA: Platinum	Western Underground
1992	"Workin' Man's Dollar"	69	—		Western Underground
1992	"Riding for a Fall" (re-recording)	72	—		Western Underground
1992	"Whatcha Gonna Do with a Cowboy" (featuring Garth Brooks)	7	5		Whatcha Gonna Do with a Cowboy
1992	"Cadillac Ranch"	18	16		Whatcha Gonna Do with a Cowboy
1993	"Look at You Girl"	52	56		Whatcha Gonna Do with a Cowboy
1993	"Under This Old Hat"	54	53		Under This Old Hat
1993	"Every Time I Roll the Dice"	61	68		Under This Old Hat
1994	"For Your Love"	50	73		Under This Old Hat
1994	"Honky Tonk World"	71	—		Haywire
1995	"Tougher Than the Rest"	67	—		Haywire
1995	"Dallas Days and Fort Worth Nights"	68	—		Haywire
1996	"Five Dollar Fine"	—	—		Stampede
1996	"Gravitational Pull"	71	77		Stampede
1997	"When I Say Forever"	65	—		Stampede
1998	"Runaway Love"	62	—		One Road Man
1998	"Bang a Drum" (with Jon Bon Jovi)	68	—		One Road Man
1999	"Life Is a Highway"	64	—		One Road Man
1999	"Stampede"	66	—		20 Greatest Hits
"—" denotes releases that did not chart

Notes:

- ^{A} "Wild and Wooley" did not chart on Hot Country Songs, but peaked at No. 8 on Hot Country Radio Breakouts.

=== 2000s ===
Year	Single	Peak positions	Album
Year	Single	US Country	Album
2000	"Silence on the Line"	65	Cowboy
2001	"He Rides the Wild Horses"	—	Cowboy
2002	"Bareback Jack"	—	After the Storm
2002	"Cowboy Up"	—	After the Storm
2004	"Horsepower"	56	Horsepower
2005	"The Ride"	—	Horsepower
2005	"Airborne Cowboy"	—	Anthology, Vol. 1
"—" denotes releases that did not chart

== Music videos ==
Year	Video	Director
1991	"Riding for a Fall"	Gary Eckert
1992	"Working Man's Dollar"	Joanne Gardner
1992	"Cadillac Ranch"	Michael Merriman
1993	"Look at You Girl"	Michael Merriman
1993	"Under This Old Hat"	R. Brad Murano/Steven T. Miller
1993	"For Your Love"	Michael Salomon
1994	"Honky Tonk World"	Michael Salomon
1994	"Tougher Than the Rest"	Michael Merriman
1996	"Five Dollar Fine" (cameo by Garth Brooks)	Michael Salomon
1997	"This Cowboy's Hat"	Ken Carpenter
1998	"Bang a Drum" (with Jon Bon Jovi)	Anthony M. Bongiovi
1999	"Life Is a Highway"	Michael Salomon
1999	"Stampede"	Michael Salomon
2000	"Silence on the Line"	Michael Salomon
2001	"He Rides the Wild Horses"	Various
2003	"Horsepower"	Eric Welch

== Notes ==
- A Western Underground also peaked at number 22 on the U.S. Top Heatseekers chart.
