= Whisper (disambiguation) =

A whisper is a sound produced by whispering.

Whisper(s) or The Whisper(s) may also refer to:

== Fictional characters ==
- Whisper (Fable), from the video game Fable
- Whisper A'Daire, from the DC Comics supervillain team Intergang
- Whisper the Wolf, from the IDW Publishing comic series Sonic the Hedgehog
- The Whisper (Arrowverse), from the TV series Batwoman

== Films ==
- Whisper (film), a 2007 American horror film directed by Stewart Hendler
- Whispers (1920 film), an American comedy drama film directed by William P. S. Earle
- Whispers (1980 film), a Lebanese documentary film directed by Maroun Bagdadi
- Whispers (1990 film), a Canadian horror film based on the novel by Dean Koontz

== Music ==
=== Groups ===
- Mosaic Whispers, or The Whispers, a Washington University co-ed a cappella group
- Ray Brown & the Whispers, a 1960s Australian rock band
- The Whispers, an American R&B singing group

=== Albums ===
- Whisper (EP), by VIXX LR, or the title song, 2017
- Whispers (Passenger album) or the title song, 2014
- Whispers (Thomas Anders album), 1991
- The Whispers (album), by the Whispers, 1979

=== Songs ===
- "Whisper" (song), by Lacy J. Dalton, 1981
- "Whisper", by 303, 2018
- "Whisper", by Alien Ant Farm from ANThology, 2001
- "Whisper", by Betty Who from Betty
- "Whisper", by Catherine from Hot Saki & Bedtime Stories, 1996
- "Whisper", by Chase Rice, 2016
- "Whisper", by Chaz Jankel from Chazablanca, 1983
- "Whisper", by Evanescence from Fallen, 2003
- "Whisper", by Girls' Generation-TTS from Holler, 2014
- "Whisper", by Meghan Trainor from I'll Sing with You, 2011
- "Whisper", by Morphine from Yes, 1995
- "Whisper", by Shouse, 2016
- "Whisper", by Tyler Joseph from No Phun Intended, 2008
- “A Whisper”, by Coldplay from A Rush of Blood to the Head, 2002
- "The Whisper", by New Kids on the Block from 10, 2013
- "The Whisper", by Queensrÿche from Rage for Order, 1986
- "Whispers" (Corina song), 1991
- "Whispers (Gettin' Louder)", a 1966 single by Jackie Wilson
- "Whispers", by Alien Weaponry from Tū, 2018
- "Whispers (I Hear You)", by All That Remains from The Fall of Ideals, 2006
- "Whispers", by Halsey from If I Can't Have Love, I Want Power, 2021
- "Whispers", by Ian Brown from Music of the Spheres, 2002
- "Whispers", by Luna from Pup Tent, 1997
- "Whispers", by Passenger from Whispers, 2014
- "Whispers", by Symphony X from The Damnation Game, 1995
- "Whispers", by XO-IQ, featured in the television series Make It Pop

== Publications ==
- Whisper (comics), a 1980s comic book series published by First Comics
- Whispers (comics), a 2012 comics series by Joshua Luna
- Whispers (magazine), a 1970s horror and fantasy fiction magazine
- Whispers (Koontz novel), a 1980 novel by Dean Koontz
- Whispers (Plain novel), a 1993 novel by Belva Plain
- The Whisper, a 2012 novel by Emma Clayton

== Television ==
=== Series ===
- Whisper (TV series), a 2017 South Korean series
- Whispers (TV series), a 2020 Saudi Arabian series
- The Whispers (TV series), a 2015 American science fiction series
- Cogar, Irish documentary series (the title is Irish for "whisper")

=== Episodes ===
- "Whisper" (Air), 2007
- "Whisper" (Night Gallery), 1973
- "Whisper" (Smallville), 2004
- "Whispers" (Adventure Time), 2017
- "Whispers" (Juliet Bravo), 1981
- "Whispers" (Star Trek: Deep Space Nine), 1994
- "Whispers" (Stargate Atlantis), 2008

== Other uses ==
- Whisper (app), a social mobile app of WhisperText LLC, for sharing secrets anonymously
- Whisper (cartridge family), a type of ammunition cartridge for firearms
- Whisper (feminine hygiene), a trade name for Always products in some Asian countries and Australia
- Whispers (radio series), a British radio comedy panel game
- Whisper (speech recognition system), a speech recognition system made by the company OpenAI
- Whisper Aircraft Whisper, a South African two-seat kit motoglider
- Whisper Systems, an enterprise mobile security company acquired by Twitter in 2011
- Whisper X350 Generation II, a South African two-seat kit aircraft

== See also ==
- Cadbury Wispa, a brand of chocolate bar
- WSPR (disambiguation)
