= Western Underground =

Studio album by Chris LeDoux
- Released: July 22, 1991
- Studios: Masterfonics, Nashville, TN
- Genre: Country
- Length: 32:10
- Label: Liberty
- Producers: Jimmy Bowen; Jerry Crutchfield

Chris LeDoux chronology
Radio and Rodeo Hits (1990)	Western Underground (1991)	Whatcha Gonna Do with a Cowboy (1992)

Professional ratings
Review scores
Source	Rating
Allmusic -	3/5 stars

Western Underground is the title of the major label debut album released by American country music artist Chris LeDoux for Liberty Records. Overall, it is his 23rd album. Although it produced no top 40 singles, the single "This Cowboy's Hat" would be covered by LeDoux's son, Ned LeDoux and Chase Rice for the latter's album Lambs & Lions. "Workin' Man's Dollar" and "Riding for a Fall" were also released as singles. The album peaked at #36 on the Billboard Top Country Albums chart.

== Content ==
"Settin' the Woods on Fire" was previously recorded by many artists including Hank Williams, Johnny Cash, and Little Richard. "Shot Full of Love" was originally recorded by Juice Newton from her 1981 album, Juice. Billy Ray Cyrus would record his own version in 1998. "Cadillac Cowboy" would later be covered by Jerry Jeff Walker, Heather Myles, and Glenn Erickson. Several of the songs on this album are re-recorded versions of songs from LeDoux's earlier albums. "Cadillac Cowboy" was originally featured on 1988's Ledoux and the Saddle Boogie Band while "This Cowboy's Hat" was first recorded in 1982 for his album Used to Want to Be a Cowboy.

== Track listing ==
No.	Title	Writer(s)	Length
1.	"County Fair"	Chris LeDoux	2:58
2.	"Riding for a Fall"	LeDoux	3:29
3.	"Thank the Cowboy for the Ride"	Ed Bruce; Paul Richey	3:26
4.	"Cadillac Cowboy"	Chuck Pyle	3:16
5.	"This Cowboy's Hat"	Jake Brooks	4:14
6.	"Shot Full of Love"	Bob McDill	3:08
7.	"The Last Drive-In"	John Grubb; Kim Tribble	3:56
8.	"Yellow Brick Road Turns Blue"	Bernie Nelson; Gary Vincent	2:34
9.	"Settin' the Woods on Fire"	Ed G. Nelson; Fred Rose	2:22
10.	"Workin' Man's Dollar"	LeDoux	2:47
11.	"Homegrown Western Saturday Night" (bonus track)		4:45

== Personnel ==
As listed in liner notes

- Chris LeDoux - lead vocals, acoustic guitar
- Mark Sissel - electric guitar
- Gary Bodily - bass guitar
- Bobby Jensen - piano, Hammond B-3 organ, synthesizer
- K.W. Turnbow - drums

=== Additional musicians ===
- Stuart Duncan - fiddle
- Jimmy Mattingly - fiddle
- Weldon Myrick - steel guitar
- Wayland Patton - backing vocals
- Brent Rowan - acoustic guitar, electric guitar, mandolin
- Curtis Young - backing vocals
- Bill (CW) Johnson - fiddle, steel guitar, mandolin, rhythm guitar

== Chart performance ==
Chart (1991)	Peak position
U.S. Billboard Top Country Albums	36
U.S. Billboard Top Heatseekers	22

== See also ==
- CMT
- Allmusic
- AOL Music
