= Her Father's House =

Her Father's House may refer to either:

- A 1928 novel by Hilda Vaughan
- A 2002 novel by Belva Plain
