= Ned LeDoux =

American drummer

- Born: August 4, 1977 (age 49); Kaycee, Wyoming, U.S.
- Genre: Country
- Occupation: Singer-songwriter
- Instruments: Vocals, guitar, drums
- Years active: 1998-present
- Label: Powder River

Ned LeDoux is an American country music singer and songwriter. He has released three studio albums.

== History ==
Ned LeDoux was born in Kaycee, Wyoming, also the hometown of his father, country music singer Chris LeDoux. The younger LeDoux began playing drums in his father's road band, Western Underground, in 1998. LeDoux began recording solo material in 2015, working with producer Mac McAnally. His debut EP Forever a Cowboy came out in 2016. LeDoux wrote four of the five songs on it. Sagebrush, his first full-length album, followed in 2017. On November 8, 2019, LeDoux released his 2nd studio album Next in Line.

LeDoux also appears on Chase Rice's 2017 album Lambs & Lions, as a duet partner on a rendition of Chris LeDoux's "This Cowboy's Hat".

From 2011 to 2025, LeDoux annually headlined Chris LeDoux Days, a town festival held in Kaycee, Wyoming, honoring his father.

== Personal life ==
LeDoux is the son of singer-songwriter and rodeo champion Chris LeDoux.

LeDoux is married to his wife Morgan. Their two-year-old daughter died of accidental choking in October 2019.

== Discography ==
=== Studio albums ===
Title	Details	Peak positions			Sales
Title	Details	US Country	US Heat	US Indie	Sales
Forever a Cowboy (EP)	Release date: December 2, 2016; Label: Powder River Records	44	2	28	
Sagebrush	Release date: November 3, 2017; Label: Powder River Records	38	1	7	US: 12,900
Next in Line	Release date: November 8, 2019; Label: Powder River Records	—	3	12	US: 2,100
Buckskin	Release date: March 11, 2022; Label: Powder River Records				
"—" denotes releases that did not chart

=== Singles ===
Year	Single	Album
2016	"Brother Highway"	Sagebrush
2017	"Some People Do"	Sagebrush

=== Other appearances ===
Title	Year	Other artist(s)	Album
"This Cowboy's Hat"	2017	Chase Rice	Lambs & Lions
"God Must Be a Cowboy"	2026	Dan Seals	Dan Seals & Friends: The Last Duet
"Things a Cowboy Ain't Ever Gonna Say"	2026	Chancey Williams	Thirsty and Blue
