= Under This Old Hat =

Studio album by Chris LeDoux
- Released: July 5, 1993
- Genre: Country
- Length: 33:50
- Label: Liberty
- Producer: Jimmy Bowen; Jerry Crutchfield

Chris LeDoux chronology
Whatcha Gonna Do with a Cowboy (1992)	Under This Old Hat (1993)	Haywire (1994)

Professional ratings
Review scores
Source	Rating
Allmusic -	3/5 stars

Under This Old Hat is the twenty-second studio album released by American country music artist Chris LeDoux. It is his third for Liberty Records. "Under This Old Hat", "Every Time I Roll the Dice", and "For Your Love" were released as singles from 1993 to 1994. The album peaked at #21 on the Billboard Top Country Albums chart.

== Content ==
The song "Every Time I Roll the Dice" was recorded the previous year (1992) by Delbert McClinton on his album, Never Been Rocked Enough, and would later be covered by many other country acts. "For Your Love" was written by Joe Ely and first appeared on his 1988 album, Dig All Night. The self-penned, "Wild and Wooly" was originally recorded in 1986 for LeDoux's album of the same name while "Even Cowboys Like a Little Rock & Roll" was first recorded for 1984's Melodies and Memories. A dance club mix of the song "Cadillac Ranch" was included as a bonus track.

== Track listing ==
No.	Title	Writer(s)	Length
1.	"Under This Old Hat"	Mike Anthony; Larry Cordle	2:30
2.	"Get Back on That Pony"	Cori Connors	2:53
3.	"Every Time I Roll the Dice"	Max D. Barnes; Troy Seals	2:33
4.	"Strugglin' Years"	Tim Johnson	2:46
5.	"Even Cowboys Like a Little Rock & Roll"	Chris LeDoux	3:09
6.	"She's Tough"	Joe Collins; Richard Fagan; Mark Irwin	3:07
7.	"Soft Place to Fall"	Bill Shore; David Wills	3:21
8.	"For Your Love"	Joe Ely	3:25
9.	"Wild and Wooly"	LeDoux	3:18
10.	"Powder River Home"	LeDoux	2:34
11.	"Cadillac Ranch" (Dance Club mix)	Chuck Jones; Chris Waters	4:14
12.	"Photo Finish" (bonus track)		4:56

== Personnel ==
As listed in liner notes

- Gary Bodily - bass guitar
- Charlie Daniels - background vocals
- Dan Dugmore - steel guitar
- Rob Hajacos - fiddle
- Bobby Jensen - keyboards
- Chris LeDoux - lead and background vocals, acoustic guitar, harmonica
- Brent Rowan - acoustic guitar, electric guitar
- Mark Sissel - electric guitar
- K.W. Turnbow - drums
- Curtis Young - background vocals
- Jonathan Yudkin - fiddle

== Chart performance ==
Chart (1993)	Peak position
U.S. Billboard Top Country Albums	21
U.S. Billboard 200	131

== Sources ==
- CMT
- Allmusic
- AOL Music
