= Eyes on You =

Eyes on You may refer to:

- "Eyes on You" (Jay Sean song), 2004
- "Eyes on You" (Chase Rice song), 2018
- Eyes on You (EP), an EP by Got7
