= The High Life (song) =

Single by Colt Ford with Chase Rice

from the album Thanks for Listening
- Released: March 18, 2014
- Genre: Country rap
- Length: 4:05
- Label: Average Joes Entertainment
- Songwriter(s): Colt Ford; Chase Rice; Jesse Rice; Zach Crowell; Chris Cline
- Producer(s): Shannon Houchins; Noah Gordon

Colt Ford singles chronology
| "Drivin' Around Song" (2013) | "The High Life" (2014) | "Workin' On" (2014) |

Chase Rice singles chronology
| "Ready Set Roll" (2013) | "The High Life" (2014) | "Gonna Wanna Tonight" (2014) |

"The High Life" is a song recorded by American country rap singer Colt Ford and country music singer Chase Rice. It is the first single from Ford's fifth studio album, Thanks for Listening. The song was written by Ford, Rice, Jesse Rice, Zach Crowell and Chris Cline.

== Critical reception ==
In his review for the album, Matt Bjorke of Roughstock gave the song a very positive review, saying that "it has already started to rival some of Colt’s previous big hits (like “Drivin’ Around Song” and “Dirt Road Anthem”). This one’s all about having a good time with your friends."

== Music video ==
The music video was directed by Scott Hansen and premiered in May 2014.

== Chart performance ==
| Chart (2014) | Peak position |
|---|---|
| US Hot Country Songs (Billboard) | 38 |
| US Rap Digital Songs (Billboard) | 20 |
