= Haywire (Chris LeDoux album) =

Studio album by Chris LeDoux
- Released: September 6, 1994
- Recorded: 1994
- Genre: Country
- Length: 41:09
- Label: Liberty
- Producer: Jimmy Bowen; Gregg Brown

Chris LeDoux chronology
Under This Old Hat (1993)	Haywire (1994)	Stampede (1996)

Professional ratings
Review scores
Source	Rating
AllMusic	4/5 stars

Haywire is the twenty-third studio album released by American country music artist Chris LeDoux. It is his last under the Liberty banner before it was renamed Capitol Records. "Honky Tonk World", "Tougher Than the Rest", and "Dallas Days and Fort Worth Nights" were released as singles. The album peaked at #17 on the Billboard Top Country Albums chart.

== Content ==
There are two cover songs on this album. "Tougher Than the Rest" was written and recorded by Bruce Springsteen for his 1987 album, Tunnel of Love. "Billy The Kid" is a cover of Charlie Daniels' 1976 song from the album, High Lonesome. "Big Love" would later be recorded and made popular by Tracy Byrd from his album of the same name.

== Track listing ==
No.	Title	Writer(s)	Length
1.	"Honky Tonk World"	Craig Wiseman; Paul Nelson	4:03
2.	"Dallas Days and Fort Worth Nights"	Kris Bergsnes; Gordon Eatherly	2:44
3.	"Tougher Than the Rest"	Bruce Springsteen	4:57
4.	"Big Love"	Michael Clark; Jeff Stevens	3:01
5.	"Love Needs a Fool"	Michael Dan Ehmig; Michael Lunn	5:03
6.	"Slow Down"	Kim Williams; Kent Blazy; Garth Brooks	2:51
7.	"Sons of the Pioneers"	Chris LeDoux	4:41
8.	"Billy The Kid"	Charlie Daniels	3:46
9.	"Hairtrigger Colt's .44"	Lore Soul	5:12
10.	"Light of the World"	Bob McDill; Paul Harrison	4:51
11.	"Six Bucks a Day" (bonus track)	Bob Frank	4:20

== Personnel ==
As listed in liner notes

- Gary Bodily - bass guitar
- Terry Crisp - steel guitar, lap steel guitar
- Dan Dugmore - steel guitar
- Rob Hajacos - fiddle
- Bobby Jensen - piano, organ
- Chris LeDoux - lead vocals
- Billy Livsey - Wurlitzer electronic piano, organ, harmonium
- Dennis Locorriere - background vocals
- Carl Marsh - keyboards
- Terry McMillan - harmonica
- Dana McVicker - background vocals
- Brent Rowan - acoustic guitar, electric guitar
- Mark Sissel - electric guitar
- K.W. Turnbow - drums

== Chart performance ==
Chart (1994)	Peak position
U.S. Billboard Top Country Albums	17
U.S. Billboard 200	128

== Sources ==
- CMT
- Allmusic
- AOL Music
