= Gonna Wanna Tonight =

Single by Chase Rice

from the album Ignite the Night
- Released: November 10, 2014
- Recorded: 2014
- Genre: Country
- Length: 3:33
- Label: Dack Janiels; RPM; Columbia Nashville
- Songwriters: Jon Nite; Jimmy Robbins; Shane McAnally
- Producer: Chris DeStefano

Chase Rice singles chronology
"The High Life" (2014)	"Gonna Wanna Tonight" (2014)	"Whisper" (2016)

"Gonna Wanna Tonight" is a song recorded by American country music artist Chase Rice. It was first released to digital retailers as the first promotional single from his third studio album, Ignite the Night, on July 22, 2014 and was released to radio on November 10, 2014 as the album's second official single. The song was written by Shane McAnally, Jimmy Robbins, and Jon Nite.

== Critical reception ==
Website Taste of Country gave the song a positive review, saying that "[after] the catchy, but very aggressive ‘Ready Set Roll,’ fans will appreciate this softer version of the former football player. He’s not a natural Romeo. Instead, he comes across as a normal guy willing to do anything to make the woman he loves happy. But he’s not totally selfless."

== Music video ==
The music video was directed by Jeff Venable and premiered in January 2015.

== Chart performance ==
The song has sold 345,000 copies in the US as of November 2015.

Chart (2014–2015)	Peak position
Canada Country (Billboard)	16
US Billboard Hot 100	67
US Country Airplay (Billboard)	2
US Hot Country Songs (Billboard)	10

=== Year-end charts ===
Chart (2015)	Position
US Country Airplay (Billboard)	10
US Hot Country Songs (Billboard)	48

== Certifications ==
Certifications for "Gonna Wanna Tonight"
Region	Certification	Certified units/sales
United States (RIAA)	Platinum	1,000,000^{‡}
^{‡} Sales+streaming figures based on certification alone.
