= Secrecy (book) =

1997 novel by Belva Plain

- Author: Belva Plain
- Language: English
- Genre: Romance novel
- Publisher: Delacorte Press
- Publication date: 1997
- Publication place: United States
- Media type: Print (Paperback)
- Pages: 432
- ISBN: 978-0-440-22511-9
- Preceded by: Promises
- Followed by: Homecoming

Secrecy is a 1997 novel and New York Times bestseller by Belva Plain. It tells the story of Charlotte, a little girl from the Dawes family whose adolescence life was shattered after she was raped by Ted, her uncle's stepson.

== Plot summary ==
Charlotte, a precocious and reticent young girl fell in love with her uncle's stepson, Ted, a charming and irresistible eighteen-year-old after a first encounter with him at her uncle's wedding. Meanwhile, Ted's mother Claudia was Charlotte's role model and confidant being that Charlotte's wasn't close to her mother who was epicurean and had a strained relationship with her father, Bill that was unable to meet up with her mother's lifestyle after the great depression that shook the family financially. On a fateful evening, Charlotte was invited by Ted and was raped. This incident left Charlotte traumatic and in a bid to overcome it, she took up courses as an architect to build a new future aided by her career.

== Reception ==
Critical reception for Secrecy was mixed, with Publishers Weekly praising the book. Kirkus Reviews criticized the book's "clammy subplot", calling the overall book "Plain Plain..., but nonetheless name- anointed for success". The Kentucky Daily News wrote that Secrecy was "ultimately a story of redemption, the kind that grows when one person dares to tell the truth".
