= Chancey Williams =

American singer-songwriter and saddle bronc rider

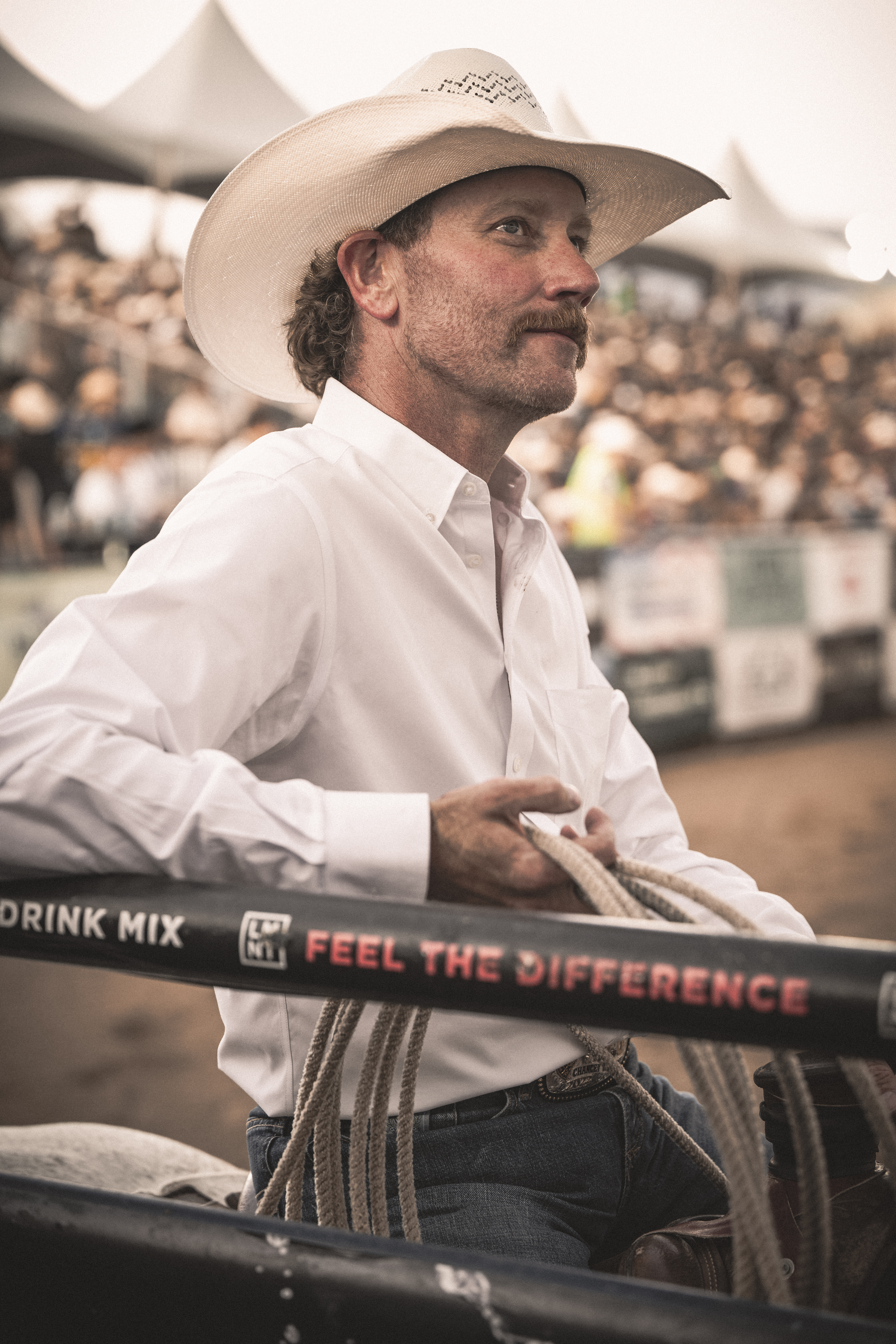
- Chancey Williams at the Big Sky PBR on July 19, 2025.

Background information
- Origin: Moorcroft, Wyoming, US
- Genres: Country music
- Years active: 2007-present
- Label: Younger Brothers Records

Chancey Williams is an American country music singer-songwriter and former saddle bronc rider. He and fellow Wyoming artist and rodeo cowboy Chris LeDoux are the only two individuals to compete in the rodeo and perform on the main stage of Cheyenne Frontier Days.

== Early life ==
Chancey Williams was raised on a ranch near the small town of Moorcroft, Wyoming. Williams followed his dad as a saddle bronc rider, going to the National High School Rodeo Finals, the College National Finals and won two rounds at Cheyenne Frontier Days. Williams has a total of four degrees, including a Bachelor's degree in Political Science and a master's degree in Public Administration from the University of Wyoming.

== Career ==
In the Fall of 2013, Williams signed with HomeSlice Artist Management, a subsidiary of The HomeSlice Group, an entertainment and media company. Williams signed with the global talent agency United Talent Agency in 2024. Chancey had his Grand Ole Opry debut on April 25, 2023, and has played it several times since. His most recent full-length album is 'One of These Days' released in 2023. Williams was inducted into Cheyenne Frontier Days of Hall of Fame in 2024.

== Discography ==
=== Studio albums ===
- HonkyTonk Road
  - Released 2008
  - Label: Self-Released
- Highway Junkie
  - Released 2011
  - Label: Self-Released
- Echo
  - Released 2013
  - Label: Self-Released
  - Peaked at #10 on Billboards Mountain-Heatseeker Chart
- Rodeo Cold Beer
  - Released 2017
  - Label : Younger Brothers Records
- 3rd Street
  - Released 2020
  - Label : Younger Brothers Records
- One of These Days
  - Released 2023
  - Label: Younger Brothers Records

=== Singles ===
- "Six Figure Job" (2008)
- "She Loves me Anyway" (2011)
- "Worth the Whiskey" (2013)
- "Down with That" (2015)
- "Silhouette" (2016)
- "Authority Song" (2016)
- "The World Needs More Cowboys" (2018)
- "Wyoming Wind" (2019)
- "Tonight We're Drinkin'" (2019)
- "Fastest Gun in Town" (2019)
- "Blame It On the Rain" (2021)
- "The Saint" (2021)
- "On The Tear Tonight" (2022)
- "Hideaway" (2022)
- "If I Die Before You Wake" (2022)
- "One of These Days" (2022)
- "Paycheck Down" (2023)
- "It Ain't You" (2023)
- "I'm On the Whiskey" (2023)
- "A Cowboy Who Would" (2024)
- "One Bad Mutha Buckaroo" (2024)
- "Adios" (2024)
- "The Ballad of Uncle Don" (2025)
- "Miles On Me" (2025)
- "Take One For The Team" (2025)
- "Pearl Snap Preacher" (2025)
- "Saddle Up" (2026)

=== Music videos ===
Year	Video	Director
2008	Six Figure Job	Delaney Gillilan
2011	She Loves Me Anyway	Brian Guice
2014	Worth the Whiskey	Brian Guice / Chris Hornick
2015	Down With That	Brian Guice
2017	Authority Song	Chris Hornick
2017	Rodeo Cold Beer	
2019	Wyoming Wind	Ryan Brewer
2019	Tonight We're Drinking	Ryan Brewer
2021	Fastest Gun In Town	Jonathan Wesenberg / Matthew Avant
2021	Meet Me In Montana	Jay Lee Downing
2022	Blame It On The Rain	Russ Hadden
2022	On The Tear	Russ Hadden / Chris Hornick
2023	Hideaway	Jay Lee Downing
2023	One Of These Days	Michael Monaco
2025	The Ballad of Uncle Don	Kenzie Holmberg
2025	Miles On Me	Kenzie Holmberg
2025	Take One For The Team	Kenzie Holmberg
2025	Pearl Snap Preacher	Kenzie Holmberg
2026	Saddle Up	Kenzie Holmberg
