= Thanks for Listening (Colt Ford album) =

Studio album by Colt Ford
- Released: July 1, 2014
- Genre: Country rap
- Length: 42:49
- Label: Average Joe's Entertainment
- Producer: Shannon Houchins; Noah Gordon; Phivestarr Productions; Kevin Kadish

Colt Ford chronology
Declaration of Independence (2012)	Thanks for Listening (2014)	Love Hope Faith (2017)

Singles from Thanks for Listening
- 1. "The High Life" Released: March 18, 2014; 2. "Workin' On" Released: July 14, 2014; 3. "Crank It Up" Released: December 1, 2014; 4. "Dirty Side" Released: April 12, 2015

Thanks for Listening is the fifth studio album by American country rap artist Colt Ford. Released on July 1, 2014 via Average Joe's Entertainment, the album features singles "Workin' On","Crank It Up", "The High Life". and "Dirty Side".

== Content ==
The album was mostly produced by Shannon "Fat Shan" Houchins and Noah Gordon, except for tracks 3, 5, and 10, which were produced by Phivestarr Productions (Jared Sciullo and DJKO), and track 8, which was produced by Kevin Kadish.

== Promotion ==
Along with the release of the album, a comic book included in the deluxe package of the available at Walmart was released entitled The Average Joes — a reference to Ford's record label — which features Ford and others involved with his record company saving the world and fighting crime.

== Critical reception ==
Giving it 3.5 stars out of 5, Steve Leggett of Allmusic wrote that "There isn't much Nashville about Ford, but he certainly understands how things work, and most importantly, he understands his audience, realizing that, while radio segments music into styles, audiences don't".

== Commercial performance ==
The album debuted at number ten on the Billboard 200 selling 23,000 copies. It also debuted at No. 2 on the Top Country album chart, and No. 1 on the Rap Albums as well as Independent Albums charts. It has sold 95,200 copies in the US as of March 2015.

== Track listing ==
No.	Title	Writer(s)	Length
1.	"Thanks for Listening" (with Daniel Lee)	Colt Ford; Brett Jones	4:08
2.	"She's Like" (with Keith Urban)	Ford; Rich Redmond; John Eddie; Jacob Scherer	3:45
3.	"Cut 'Em All" (with Willie Robertson)	Ford; Jared Sciullo; Justin Spillner	2:40
4.	"The High Life" (with Chase Rice)	Ford; Chase Rice; Jesse Rice; Zach Crowell; Chris Cline	4:05
5.	"Dirty Side" (with Walker Hayes)	Ford; Sciullo; Walker Hayes	3:40
6.	"Sip It Slow" (with Lee Brice)	Ford; Shannon Houchins; Noah Gordon	3:34
7.	"Workin' On"	Hayes; Doug Waterman	3:44
8.	"Crank It Up"	Kevin Kadish; Redmond; Scherer	3:20
9.	"Farm Life" (with Justin Moore)	Clare Dunn; Benjamin Caver; Blake Bollinger	3:23
10.	"Outshine Me"	Ford; Sciullo; Spillner; Mike Fiorentino	3:52
11.	"Crickets" (with Jerrod Niemann)	Ford; J. Hyde; J. Boyer	3:09
12.	"Washed in the Mud" (with Randy Houser)	Ford; Gary Loyd; Mark Morton; Justin David	3:29
Total length:			42:49

== Charts ==
=== Weekly charts ===
Chart (2014)	Peak position
US Billboard 200	10
US Top Country Albums (Billboard)	2
US Independent Albums (Billboard)	1
US Top Rap Albums (Billboard)	1

=== Year-end charts ===
Chart (2014)	Position
US Top Country Albums (Billboard)	52
US Independent Albums (Billboard)	25

=== Singles ===
Year	Single	Peak positions
Year	Single	US Country
2014	"The High Life" (with Chase Rice)	38
"—" denotes releases that did not chart
