= Stampede (Chris LeDoux album) =

Studio album by Chris LeDoux
- Released: March 19, 1996
- Recorded: 1995
- Genre: Country
- Length: 39:43
- Label: Capitol Nashville
- Producer: Gregg Brown

Chris LeDoux chronology
Haywire (1994)	Stampede (1996)	Live (1997)

Professional ratings
Review scores
Source	Rating
Allmusic	3/5 stars
Chicago Tribune	3/4 stars

Stampede is the twenty-fourth studio album by American country music artist Chris LeDoux. It was his first studio album released for Capitol Nashville after the Liberty Records name was retired. "Gravitational Pull", "When I Say Forever" and "Five Dollar Fine" were released as singles but didn't make the top 40. "Stampede" would later be released as a single from his 20 Greatest hits Collection in 1999. The album peaked at #33 on the Billboard Top Country Albums chart.

== Content ==
The song "Now That's All Right with Me" was also recorded in 1996 by Mandy Barnett on her self-titled debut album. "Fathers and Sons" was first recorded in 1991 by Charlie Daniels on his album Renegade and then in 1993 on the album Balancing Act by John Jarvis, who co-wrote the song.

== Track listing ==
No.	Title	Writer(s)	Length
1.	"Gravitational Pull"	Thomas "Butch" Curry; Ray Methvin	4:05
2.	"Five Dollar Fine"	Alex Harvey	3:41
3.	"Now That's All Right with Me"	Kostas; Tony Perez	3:06
4.	"Take Me to the Rodeo"	Chris LeDoux	4:34
5.	"Fathers and Sons"	John Barlow Jarvis; Gary Nicholson	3:41
6.	"I'll Get the Job Done"	Judd Erickson; Michael Noble; Michael Woody	2:31
7.	"Stampede"	LeDoux	5:12
8.	"When I Say Forever"	Dennis Linde	3:53
9.	"Calico Moon"	Doug Gill; Gary Vincent	3:33
10.	"That's What Loving You Means to Me"	Al Anderson; Craig Wiseman	5:25
11.	"Rainbow Rider" (bonus track)		3:05

== Personnel ==
As listed in liner notes

- Sam Bacco - percussion, marimba
- Mike Brignardello - bass guitar
- Pat Buchanan - acoustic guitar, electric guitar, slide guitar
- Kathy Burdick - background vocals
- Larry Byrom - acoustic guitar, electric guitar, slide guitar
- Alisa Carroll - background vocals
- Larry Franklin - fiddle
- Paul Franklin - steel guitar
- Steve Hinson - steel guitar
- John Jorgenson - electric guitar, 6 string bass
- Chris LeDoux - lead vocals, acoustic guitar
- Billy Livsey - Hammond organ, clavinet, Wurlitzer, Vox Organ
- Dennis Locorriere - background vocals
- Louis Dean Nunley - background vocals
- Hargus "Pig" Robbins - piano
- Michael Rojas - piano
- Steve Turner - drums, percussion

== Charts ==
Chart performance for Stampede
Chart (1996)	Peak position
US Top Country Albums (Billboard)	33
