= Whatcha Gonna Do with a Cowboy (song) =

Single by Chris LeDoux with Garth Brooks

from the album Whatcha Gonna Do with a Cowboy
- B-side: "Western Skies"
- Released: July 13, 1992
- Studio: Jack's Tracks (Nashville, Tennessee)
- Genre: Country
- Length: 2:33
- Label: Liberty
- Songwriters: Garth Brooks; Mark D. Sanders
- Producers: Allen Reynolds; Jerry Crutchfield

Chris LeDoux singles chronology
"Riding for a Fall" (1992)	"Whatcha Gonna Do with a Cowboy" (1992)	"Cadillac Ranch" (1992)

Garth Brooks singles chronology
"The River" (1992)	"Whatcha Gonna Do with a Cowboy" (1992)	"We Shall Be Free" (1992)

"Whatcha Gonna Do with a Cowboy" is a song written by Garth Brooks and Mark D. Sanders, and recorded by American country music artist Chris LeDoux with Brooks. It was released in July 1992 as the first single from his album Whatcha Gonna Do with a Cowboy. The song reached number 7 on the Billboard Hot Country Singles & Tracks chart in September 1992. Brooks is featured as a duet partner, although he only received chart credit in Canada.

== Critical reception ==
Deborah Evans Price, of Billboard magazine reviewed the song favorably, saying that intensity compensates for LeDoux's lack of vocal range. She goes on to call it a "cheeky and thoroughly engaging title tune."

== Chart performance ==
"Whatcha Gonna Do with a Cowboy" debuted at number 49 on the U.S. Billboard Hot Country Singles & Tracks for the week of July 25, 1992.

Chart (1992)	Peak position
Canada Country Singles (RPM)	5
US Hot Country Songs (Billboard)	7

=== Year-end charts ===
Chart (1992)	Position
Canada Country Tracks (RPM)	59
