= Whispers (TV series) =

- Genre: Mystery; Thriller
- Directed by: Hana Alomair
- Starring: Elham Ali; Mysoon Alruwaily; Norah Al Anbar
- Country of origin: Saudi Arabia
- Original language: Arabic
- No. of seasons: 1
- No. of episodes: 8

Production
- Production companies: EP Saudi; Hipster Media; Circle Post Production

Original release
- Release: June 11, 2020

Whispers is a 2020 Saudi Arabian mystery thriller television series written and directed by Hana Alomair and starring Elham Ali, Mysoon Alruwaily, and Norah Al Anbar.

== Cast ==
- Elham Ali as Lama
- Mysoon Alruwaily as Arwa
- Norah Al Anbar as Sawsan
- Leila Arabi as Samar
- Shaimaa Al Fadl as Amal
- Ali Al Sharif as Khaled
- Nada Tawhid as Wa'ad
- Mohammad Ali as Omar
- Osama Alqess as Ibrahim

== Release ==
Whispers was released on June 11, 2020.
