= Lonely If You Are =

Single by Chase Rice

from the album The Album
- Released: June 7, 2019
- Genre: Country pop
- Length: 2:55
- Label: Dack Janiels / Broken Bow
- Songwriters: Chase Rice; Lindsay Rimes; Hunter Phelps
- Producers: Chase Rice; Chris DeStefano

Chase Rice singles chronology
"Eyes on You" (2018)	"Lonely If You Are" (2019)	"Drinkin' Beer. Talkin' God. Amen." (2020)

Music videos
- "Lonely If You Are" on YouTube
- "Lonely If You Are (Lyric Video)" on YouTube

"Lonely If You Are" is a song recorded by American country music singer Chase Rice. It is the lead single to his fourth studio album The Album. Rice wrote the song with Lindsay Rimes and Hunter Phelps, and co-produced it with Chris DeStefano.

== Content and history ==
Rice released the single in mid-2019. He wrote the song with Lindsay Rimes and Hunter Phelps. Featuring mainly acoustic guitar as the accompaniment, the song is described by Rice as "telling this special girl that even though we might not officially be together right now, 'go ahead, have a good time with your friends...but when that all fades away, give me a call. I’ll be there.'"

Rice promoted the song on an episode of The Bachelor on January 27, 2020. In the episode, Victoria Fuller attends a concert performed by Rice, whom she had previously dated. At the time of the episode, Rice was unaware that she would be in it. This episode led to a rumor that Rice wrote the song about Fuller, which he denied. Reid Long directed the music video, which was filmed at 20 Monroe Live, a music venue in Grand Rapids, Michigan. In it, several children portray the roles of Rice, his band, and his fans.

== Chart performance ==
=== Weekly charts ===
Chart (2019–2020)	Peak position
Canada Country (Billboard)	43
US Billboard Hot 100	91
US Country Airplay (Billboard)	12
US Hot Country Songs (Billboard)	19

=== Year-end charts ===
Chart (2019)	Position
US Hot Country Songs (Billboard)	99

Chart (2020)	Position
US Country Airplay (Billboard)	46
US Hot Country Songs (Billboard)	60

== Certifications ==
Region	Certification	Certified units/sales
Canada (Music Canada)	Gold	40,000^{‡}
United States (RIAA)	Platinum	1,000,000^{‡}
^{‡} Sales+streaming figures based on certification alone.
