= Cadillac Ranch (Chris LeDoux song) =

Single by Chris LeDoux

from the album Whatcha Gonna Do with a Cowboy
- B-side: "Call of the Wild"
- Released: October 19, 1992
- Studio: Jack's Tracks (Nashville, Tennessee)
- Genre: Country
- Length: 2:52
- Label: Liberty
- Songwriters: Chuck Jones; Chris Waters
- Producers: Jimmy Bowen; Jerry Crutchfield

Chris LeDoux singles chronology
"Whatcha Gonna Do with a Cowboy" (1992)	"Cadillac Ranch" (1992)	"Look at You Girl" (1993)

"Cadillac Ranch" is a song written by Chuck Jones and Chris Waters, and recorded by American country music artist Chris LeDoux. It was released in October 1992 as the second single from his album Whatcha Gonna Do with a Cowboy. The song reached number 18 on the Billboard Hot Country Singles & Tracks chart and number 16 on the Canadian RPM Country Tracks.

== Content ==
"Cadillac Ranch" is an uptempo song, in which the narrator discusses turning their farm into a party nightspot because of their financial issues.

== Critical reception ==
Deborah Evans Price, of Billboard magazine reviewed the song favorably, calling it a "rock'n'roll-ish tale about converting a failing farm into a thriving nightspot."

== Music video ==
The music video was directed by Michael Merriman and premiered in October 1992.

== Chart performance ==
"Cadillac Ranch" debuted at number 52 on the U.S. Billboard Hot Country Singles & Tracks for the week of November 7, 1992.

Chart (1992–1993)	Peak position
Canada Country Singles (RPM)	16
US Hot Country Songs (Billboard)	18
