= Ignite the Night =

Studio album by Chase Rice
- Released: August 19, 2014
- Genre: Country rock
- Labels: Dack Janiels; Columbia Nashville
- Producers: Chad Carlson; Scott Cooke; Chris DeStefano; Rhett Akins (exec.)

Chase Rice chronology
Ready Set Roll (2013)	Ignite the Night (2014)	Lambs & Lions (2017)

Singles from Ignite the Night
- 1. "How She Rolls" Released: April 3, 2013; 2. "Ready Set Roll" Released: November 11, 2013; 3. "Gonna Wanna Tonight" Released: November 10, 2014

Ignite the Night is the third studio album by American country music artist Chase Rice. It was released on August 19, 2014 via Dack Janiels and Columbia Nashville.

== Commercial performance ==
The album debuted at number one on the Billboard Top Country Albums and at number three on the Billboard 200, selling 44,000 copies. As of November 2015, the album has sold 305,300 copies in the U.S.

In Canada, the album debuted at number seven on the Canadian Albums Chart, selling 2,600 copies in its first week.

== Track listing ==
No.	Title	Writer(s)	Length
1.	"Ready Set Roll"	Chase Rice; Rhett Akins; Chris DeStefano	3:10
2.	"Do It Like This"	DeStefano; Dallas Davidson; Ashley Gorley	3:35
3.	"Beach Town"	Rice; DeStefano; Jon Nite	3:43
4.	"MMM Girl"	Rice; Rodney Clawson; Lynn Hutton	3:43
5.	"Beer with the Boys"	Rice; Gorley; DeStefano	3:28
6.	"Carolina Can"	Rice; Scooter Carusoe	3:40
7.	"We Goin' Out"	Rice; DeStefano; Shane Minor	3:29
8.	"Gonna Wanna Tonight"	Nite; Jimmy Robbins; Shane McAnally	3:33
9.	"Look at My Truck"	Rice; Cole Taylor	3:16
10.	"U Turn"	Rice; Minor; Zach Crowell	3:30
11.	"50 Shades of Crazy"	Rice; Nite; DeStefano	3:10
12.	"What's Your Name"	Zach Crowell; Nicolle Galyon; Matt Jenkins	3:18
13.	"How She Rolls"	Rice; Brian Kelley	2:59
14.	"Jack Daniels and Jesus"	Rice; Kelley; Amanda Flynn	3:55

CD-exclusive bonus track
No.	Title	Writer(s)	Length
15.	"Whoa"	Rice; Kelley; Jesse Rice; Russell Dickerson; Tyler Hubbard	3:30

Party Edition
No.	Title	Writer(s)	Length
15.	"Party Up" (featuring Colt Ford)	Rice; Colt Ford; Blair Daly; Ross Copperman	3:13
16.	"Country in Ya"	Rice; Adam Sanders	3:24
17.	"Best Beers of Our Lives"	Rice; Minor; DeStefano	3:27
18.	"Ride"	Joseph Somers-Morales; Cody Tarpley	4:01

== Personnel ==
- Nick Buda – drums
- Scott Cooke – bass guitar, drum loop, electric guitar, programming, synthesizer
- Dallas Davidson – background vocals
- Chris DeStefano – bass guitar, drum programming, acoustic guitar, electric guitar, mandolin, pedal steel guitar, percussion, background vocals
- Shannon Forrest – drums
- Nicolle Galyon – drum programming
- Ashley Gorley – background vocals
- Wes Hightower – background vocals
- Charlie Judge – Hammond B-3 organ, strings, synthesizer
- Rob McNelley – electric guitar
- Russ Pahl – pedal steel guitar
- Chase Rice – lead vocals
- Darren Savard – acoustic guitar, electric guitar, mandolin
- Adam Shoenfeld – electric guitar, solo
- Dallas Smith – background vocals
- Ilya Toshinsky – banjo, 12-string guitar, acoustic guitar, baritone guitar, electric guitar, slide guitar

== Chart performance ==
=== Weekly charts ===
Chart (2014–16)	Peak position
Australian Albums (ARIA)	23
Canadian Albums (Billboard)	7
US Billboard 200	3
US Top Country Albums (Billboard)	1
US Independent Albums (Billboard)	1

=== Year-end charts ===
Chart (2014)	Position
US Billboard 200	163
US Top Country Albums (Billboard)	38
US Independent Albums (Billboard)	14
Chart (2015)	Position
US Billboard 200	95
US Top Country Albums (Billboard)	20
