= Whatcha Gonna Do with a Cowboy =

Studio album by Chris LeDoux
- Released: July 20, 1992
- Studio: Jack's Tracks (Nashville, Tennessee)
- Genre: Country
- Length: 32:16
- Label: Liberty
- Producer: Jimmy Bowen (all tracks except 5), Jerry Crutchfield (all tracks), Allen Reynolds (track 5)

Chris LeDoux chronology
Western Underground (1991)	Whatcha Gonna Do with a Cowboy (1992)	Under This Old Hat (1993)

Singles from Whatcha Gonna Do with a Cowboy
- 1. "Whatcha Gonna Do with a Cowboy" Released: July 13, 1992; 2. "Cadillac Ranch" Released: October 19, 1992; 3. "Look at You Girl" Released: 1993

Professional ratings
Review scores
Source	Rating
AllMusic	4.5/5 stars

Whatcha Gonna Do with a Cowboy is an album released by American country music artist Chris LeDoux. It is his 24th album and his second for Liberty Records. "Whatcha Gonna Do with a Cowboy" and "Cadillac Ranch" were released as singles. The first single, a duet with Garth Brooks, became his most successful single, reaching No. 7 on the Hot Country Songs chart in the U.S. and No. 5 in Canada. The second single reached No. 18 and No. 16 in the U.S. and Canada, respectively. The album peaked at No. 9 on the Billboard Top Country Albums chart and No. 5 on the Canadian RPM country albums chart. It has been certified Gold by the RIAA.

== Content ==
Several of the songs on this album are re-recorded versions of songs from LeDoux's earlier albums. "Hooked on an 8 Second Ride", "Look at You Girl", and "Call of the Wild" were all originally featured on 1988's Chris LeDoux and the Saddle Boogie Band while "Little Long-Haired Outlaw" was from 1986's Wild and Wooly. "I'm Ready If You're Willing" is a cover of Johnny Horton's 1956 hit.

== Track listing ==
No.	Title	Writer(s)	Length
1.	"Call of the Wild"	Chris LeDoux; Tony Bessire	3:13
2.	"You Just Can't See Him from the Road"	Donnie Blanz; Ed Bruce; Judith Bruce	3:02
3.	"Little Long-Haired Outlaw"	LeDoux	4:15
4.	"Making Ends Meet"	Mark Elliot; Jamie Klee	3:13
5.	"Whatcha Gonna Do with a Cowboy" (featuring Garth Brooks)	Garth Brooks; Mark D. Sanders	2:33
6.	"Hooked on an 8 Second Ride"	LeDoux	3:31
7.	"I'm Ready If You're Willing"	Vernon Claud; Jerry Organ	2:56
8.	"Look at You Girl"	Lanty Ross	3:10
9.	"Cadillac Ranch"	Chuck Jones; Chris Waters	2:52
10.	"Western Skies"	LeDoux	3:31

== Personnel ==
As listed in liner notes

- Gary Bodily - bass guitar
- Bruce Bouton - steel guitar
- Mark Casstevens - acoustic guitar
- Mike Chapman - bass guitar
- Dan Dugmore - steel guitar
- Rob Hajacos - fiddle
- Bobby Jensen - keyboards
- Chris LeDoux - vocals, acoustic guitar
- Chris Leuzinger - acoustic guitar
- Wayland Patton - background vocals
- Brent Rowan - acoustic guitar, electric guitar
- Mark Sissel - electric guitar
- Milton Sledge - drums
- K.W. Turnbow - drums
- Bobby Wood - piano
- Curtis Young - background vocals
- Jonathan Yudkin - fiddle

== Chart performance ==
Chart (1992)	Peak position
U.S. Billboard Top Country Albums	9
U.S. Billboard 200	65
