= The Album (Chase Rice album) =

Studio album by Chase Rice
- Released: May 28, 2021
- Genre: Country pop; country rock
- Length: 47:22
- Label: Broken Bow / Dack Janiels
- Producer: Casey Brown; Corey Crowder; Chris DeStefano; Tyler Hubbard; Martin Johnson; Zach Kale; Brian Kelley; Brandon Paddock; Chase Rice; Jimmy Robbins; Jonathan Singleton

Chase Rice chronology
Lambs & Lions (2017)	The Album (2021)	I Hate Cowboys & All Dogs Go To Hell (2023)

Singles from The Album
- 1. "Lonely If You Are" Released: June 7, 2019; 2. "Drinkin' Beer. Talkin' God. Amen." Released: November 30, 2020

The Album is the fifth studio album by American country music artist Chase Rice. It was released on May 28, 2021, by Broken Bow Records and Dack Janiels Records.

== Content ==
An EP entitled The Album, Pt. I was released on January 24, 2020, which consisted of the album's first seven tracks, including its lead single "Lonely If You Are". A second EP, The Album, Pt. II, was released on May 15, 2020 and included the next four tracks. The last four tracks, including the album's second single "Drinkin' Beer. Talkin' God. Amen.", were released with the rest of the full album on May 28, 2021. Rice co-wrote eleven of the album's fifteen tracks.

== Critical reception ==
Will Carter of Rock n' Load Magazine wrote a generally favorable review of the album upon release. While criticizing the album for its country pop sound, he wrote that the album is an "excellent release and will surely please Chase’s legions of fans and certainly win him more."

== Commercial performance ==
The Album peaked at number 34 on both the Billboard Top Country Albums and Independent Albums charts.

== Track listing ==
Adapted from album credits.

No.	Title	Writer(s)	Producer(s)	Length
1.	"American Nights"	Kevin Griffin; Martin Johnson; François Tétaz	Johnson; Brandon Paddock	3:16
2.	"Lonely If You Are"	Chase Rice; Lindsay Rimes; Hunter Phelps	C. Rice; Chris DeStefano	2:56
3.	"Everywhere"	C. Rice; Zachary Kale; James McNair	Kale	2:57
4.	"Best Night Ever"	C. Rice; DeStefano; Matt Jenkins	C. Rice; DeStefano	3:02
5.	"Messy"	Seth Ennis; Kylie Sackley	C. Rice; DeStefano	3:26
6.	"In the Car"	C. Rice; Jesse Rice; Phelps; Mark Holman	C. Rice; DeStefano	3:03
7.	"Forever to Go"	Jordan Minton; Casey Brown; Geoffrey Warburton	Brown	2:57
8.	"You"	C. Rice; Jon Nite; Kale	DeStefano	3:14
9.	"Break. Up. Drunk."	C. Rice; Jordan Schmidt; Phelps	DeStefano	2:56
10.	"Down Home Runs Deep"	Daniel Ross; Michael Hardy; Mike Walker; McNair	DeStefano	3:14
11.	"Belong"	C. Rice; DeStefano; Nite	DeStefano	3:39
12.	"The Nights"	C. Rice; Kale; McNair	Kale	3:46
13.	"Bedroom"	C. Rice; Nite; Jimmy Robbins	Corey Crowder	2:59
14.	"If I Didn't Have You"	C. Rice; Channing Wilson; Jonathan Singleton	Singleton; Jimmy Robbins	3:09
15.	"Drinkin' Beer. Talkin' God. Amen." (featuring Florida Georgia Line)	C. Rice; Crowder; Phelps; Cale Dodds	C. Rice; Crowder; Tyler Hubbard; Brian Kelley	2:40

== Personnel ==
Adapted from The Album liner notes.

Vocals

- Casey Brown – background vocals
- Naomi Cooke – background vocals
- Corey Crowder – background vocals
- Kiley Dean – background vocals
- Chris DeStefano – background vocals
- Dan Johnson – background vocals
- Martin Johnson – background vocals
- Zach Kale – background vocals
- Taela Lacour – background vocals
- Linda McKernan – background vocals
- Jordan Minton – background vocals
- Mark Noel – background vocals
- Brandon Paddock – background vocals
- Chase Rice – background vocals, lead vocals
- Jonathan Singleton – background vocals
- Russell Terrell – background vocals

Musicians

- Ryan Barnette – electric guitar
- Casey Brown – keys, electric guitar, programming, acoustic guitar
- Tyler Chiarelli – guitar
- Corey Crowder – acoustic guitar, programming
- Chris DeStefano – banjo, bass, keyboards, synth, programming, electric guitar, acoustic guitar, live bass, dobro, piano, drums, drum programming
- Jonny Fung – electric guitar, programming
- Zach Kale – electric guitar, keys, programming
- Charlie Judge – keys, piano, programming
- Todd Lombardo – acoustic guitar, banjo, high strung guitar, Resonator
- Tony Lucido – bass
- Rob McNelley – electric guitar
- Miles McPherson – drums, percussion
- Justin Ostrander – electric
- Chase Rice – acoustic guitar, dobro
- Jimmy Robbins – acoustic guitar, programming, keyboards, bass
- Jerry Roe – drums, percussion
- Jonathan Singleton – banjo, electric guitar
- Tyler Tomlinson – electric guitar
- Ilya Toshinskiy – acoustic guitar, dobro, electric guitar, banjo
- Derek Wells – electric guitar, steel guitar
- Alex Wright – B3 keys, piano, synth, Wurlitzer

guitar

Technical

- Adam Ayan – mastering (tracks 13 and 15)
- Casey Brown – producer (track 7)
- David Cook – digital editing
- Corey Crowder – producer (tracks 13 and 15), recording, digital editing
- Chris DeStefano – producer (all tracks except 1, 3, 7, 12-15), recording, digital editing
- Josh Ditty – assistant engineer, digital editing
- Kelsey Granda – production coordinator
- Tyler Hubbard – producer (track 15)
- Martin Johnson – producer, sound production (track 1)
- Scott Johnson – production coordinator
- Zach Kale – producer (tracks 3 and 12), recording, digital editing
- Brian Kelley – producer (track 15)
- Pete Lyman – mastering (all tracks except 13 and 15)
- Alyson McAnally – production coordinator
- Miles McPherson – digital editing
- Brandon Paddock – producer, sound production (track 1)
- Chase Rice – producer (all tracks except 1, 3, 7, 12-14)
- Bryce Roberts – assistant engineer
- Jimmy Robbins – producer (track 14), recording, digital editing
- Chris Small – vocal editing engineer
- Jonathan Singleton – producer (track 14), recording

== Charts ==
=== Weekly charts ===
Weekly chart performance for The Album
Chart (2021)	Peak position
US Top Country Albums (Billboard)	34
US Independent Albums (Billboard)	34

=== Year-end charts ===
Year-end chart performance for The Album
Chart (2021)	Position
US Top Country Albums (Billboard)	92

== Release history ==
Region	Date	Label	Format	Ref.
Various	May 28, 2021	Broken Bow; Dack Janiels	Digital download; Streaming	
Various	October 1, 2021	Broken Bow; Dack Janiels	CD	
