= Drinkin' Beer. Talkin' God. Amen. =

Single by Chase Rice featuring Florida Georgia Line

from the album The Album
- Released: November 30, 2020
- Genre: Country
- Length: 2:40
- Label: Dack Janiels; Broken Bow; BMLG
- Songwriters: Chase Rice; Cale Dodds; Corey Crowder; Hunter Phelps
- Producers: Chase Rice; Corey Crowder; Florida Georgia Line

Chase Rice singles chronology
"Lonely If You Are" (2019)	"Drinkin' Beer. Talkin' God. Amen." (2020)	"If I Were Rock & Roll" (2021)

Florida Georgia Line singles chronology
"Long Live" (2020)	"Drinkin' Beer. Talkin' God. Amen." (2020)	"Lil Bit" (2021)

Music video
- "Drinkin' Beer. Talkin' God. Amen." on YouTube

"Drinkin' Beer. Talkin' God. Amen." is a song recorded by American country music singer Chase Rice featuring American country music duo Florida Georgia Line. It was released on November 30, 2020 as the second single from his album The Album. Rice wrote the song with Cale Dodds, Corey Crowder and Hunter Phelps, and produced with Crowder and Florida Georgia Line.

== Background and content ==
It is the first collaboration between Rice and Florida Georgia Line since they co-wrote the latter's 2012 country music hit "Cruise".

Rice told Radio.com he wrote the song with Cale Dodds, Hunter Phelps and Corey Crowder, and mentioned: “We wrote this song before the COVID-19 pandemic, which is crazy because it's almost like God was intervening in the song, said that, ‘Hey y’all, get ready. You're gonna have a lot of time to sit around a fire, drink some beer and hang out with me,’” “It's a special song in that way because it really is a celebration of what 2020 became for us and a lot of other people – slowing down to enjoy these moments with our loved ones and having deeper, more meaningful conversations with each other.”

== Music video ==
The music video was directed by TK McKamy and released on March 28, 2021. Filmed at an old granary on Rice's Nashville property, three cowboys open beers and talk about their lives next to a bonfire.

Rice told to CMT, pointed out the video's characteristic: "We weren't acting or remembering lines — we were just hanging out on my farm as real friends enjoying the night together. That's what this song is all about, and it was special to bring it to life."

== Commercial performance ==
The song peaked at No. 24 on the Billboard Hot 100 chart, becoming Rice's highest-charting career single to date.

== Charts ==
=== Weekly charts ===
Weekly chart performance for "Drinkin' Beer. Talkin' God. Amen."
Chart (2020–2021)	Peak position
Australia Country Hot 50 (TMN)	11
Canada Hot 100 (Billboard)	62
Canada Country (Billboard)	1
US Billboard Hot 100	24
US Country Airplay (Billboard)	1
US Hot Country Songs (Billboard)	3

=== Year-end charts ===
Year-end chart performance for "Drinkin' Beer. Talkin' God. Amen."
Chart (2021)	Position
US Billboard Hot 100	99
US Country Airplay (Billboard)	7
US Hot Country Songs (Billboard)	30

== Certifications ==
Certifications for "Drinkin' Beer. Talkin' God. Amen."
Region	Certification	Certified units/sales
United States (RIAA)	Platinum	1,000,000^{‡}
^{‡} Sales+streaming figures based on certification alone.
