= Belva Plain =

American writer (1915–2010)

- Born: Belva Offenberg; October 9, 1915; New York City, New York
- Died: October 12, 2010 (aged 95); Short Hills, New Jersey
- Education: Barnard College
- Occupation: Writer
- Notable work: Whispers and Secrecy

Belva Plain (October 9, 1915 – October 12, 2010), née Offenberg, was a best-selling American author of mainstream fiction.

== Biography ==
Belva Offenberg was a third-generation Jewish American who was raised in New York City. She graduated from Barnard College in 1939 with a degree in history. Plain lived in the Short Hills section of Millburn, New Jersey.

Before breaking into publishing, Belva Plain wrote short stories for magazines while raising her three children. She sold her first story to Cosmopolitan at age 25 and "contributed several dozen to various women's magazines until she had three children in rapid succession." Her first novel, Evergreen, was published in 1978. It topped the New York Times Bestseller List for 41 weeks and was made into a TV miniseries. Evergreen followed the character Anna, "a feisty, redheaded Jewish immigrant girl from Poland in turn-of-the-century New York, whose family story continues through several decades and four more books.".

The New York Times summed up her career

Strong-willed women, many of them Jewish and red-haired as well, appear again and again in Ms. Plain’s fiction. Some of her novels use historical settings — “Crescent City,” published in 1984, was set in the Jewish community of Civil War-era New Orleans. Other books tell stories about contemporary issues, sometimes inspired by the headlines — divorce (“Promises”), adoption (“Blessings”), child sexual abuse (“The Carousel”) or babies accidentally switched at birth (“Daybreak”). All of them are full of passion, but there is very little explicit sex.

At her death, there were over 30 million copies of her twenty-plus novels in print in 22 languages. Twenty-one of her novels appeared on the New York Times bestseller list. Plain did not own a computer, and wrote all of her novels long-hand on a yellow pad. "A disciplined worker, she wrote for several hours in the morning five days a week. She produced a 500- or 600-page novel every year or so."

== Personal life ==
Plain was married to her husband, Irving Plain, for more than forty years. He died in 1982. She died on October 12, 2010, at her home in Short Hills, New Jersey.

== Bibliography ==
=== Werner Family Saga ===
- Evergreen (1978)
- Golden Cup (1986)
- Tapestry (1988)
- Harvest (1990)
- Heartwood (2011)

=== Novels ===
- Random Winds (1980)
- Eden Burning (1982)
- Crescent City (1984)
- Blessings (1989)
- Treasures (1992)
- Whispers (1993)
- Daybreak (1994)
- The Carousel (1995)
- Promises (1996)
- Secrecy (1997)
- Homecoming (1997)
- Legacy of Silence (1998)
- Fortune's Hand (1999)
- After the Fire (2000)
- Looking Back (2001)
- Her Father's House (2002)
- The Sight of the Stars (2003)
- Crossroads (2004)
