= Whispers (Plain novel) =

1993 book by Belva Plain

First edition (publ. Delacorte Press)

Whispers is a 1993 domestic violence novel written by Belva Plain.

It takes place in Connecticut, where the young and naïve secretary Lynn falls in love with the ambitious and handsome executive Robert. Robert seems like a marvelous partner at first, but has occasional violent outbursts. The novel brings into question whether it is okay for a partner to hit their significant other if it is only "every now and then".

== Summary ==
Lynn is a middle class secretary who was born in Iowa. She simple, yet pretty and even though she's smart due to her small town upbringing she is naive. Her self esteem fluctuates between medium and low, finding herself rather ordinary and very short. At work she befriends and later falls in love with her boss, Robert, a handsome and talented young man who is destined to a great future within the company. They start dating and quickly get married. After Robert gets a promotion they move to Connecticut with her two young daughters. At first Robert is sweet and gentle, retelling his life like a fairytale with a tragic past, his parents being lovely but having an untimely death back when he was young, having been married once but tragically being left by his neurotic ex-wife. Lynn gets entangled in a web of sugarcoated lies and half truths and is dazzled by Robert's good looks and gentlemanly demeanor. Yet as time and their marriage progresses Robert lets his true colours show: he's possessive, domineering, controlling, and abusive emotionally, psychologically, and lastly physically. He's a narcissist and a perfectionist that wants to have "either the best or nothing", demanding everyone to follow the same mantra and exploding if things don't go his way. After a series of events where the truth of his former marriage is revealed he ultimately beats Lynn to near death and ends up without a marriage and without a family. Lynn learns that her self worth is not to be dictated by anyone, that being abused is not something to be ashamed of as it's not her fault, that rather she should stand up for herself and her little family and rise her voice to protect herself and her loved ones. She also realizes that she is not a helpless little woman after all, that she has an inner fire that might not be showy but is just as roaring as anyone else's, giving her the strength to stand on her own two feet, finally opening her restaurant, and letting herself seek her much dreamed happiness.

== Characters ==
Lynn: The protagonist of the novel, naive, young, pretty and vulnerable, she falls in love with Robert and blames herself for many of the faults he perceives in her which leads to abuse. She is the mother of three daughters, one of the deceased in a drowning accident, and a son. She loves to cook and dreams of having her own restaurant and catering service company, yet her husband constantly puts her down, abusing her not only emotionally and psychologically but also physically. She ends her relationship with Robert after being almost beat to death in front of her baby son and after some years starts a new relationship with Bruce.

Robert: A company executive on the fast-track to being promoted. He is picture-perfect on the outside and career-oriented. Even at home, he appears to be the perfect husband. However, he reacts violently to embarrassment or negative situations, oftentimes resulting in a beating to his wife, Lynn. He is a perfectionist that will not take no for an answer, wanting everything to his liking ("Either the best or nothing."), domineering to the extent of never letting his wife manage money or trying to control his eldest daughter's friendships and relationships when they are not to his liking. He was married once before to a woman named Amada and had a son with her, who refuses to see him. He ends up in disgrace after the "secret" of his sporadic beatings to his wife leaks out, thus losing his job, his reputation, and his family.

Bruce: Robert's subordinate, Lynn's friend, and Josie's husband. He's a sweet natured man with golden hair that "has a friendly twinkle in his eyes and likes cats" according to Josie. He has a passion for antiques and buys a lot of them. His deep love for his wife transpires in every action he takes. Yet, he admits he always thought of Lynn as someone other than just a friend saying that "maybe there's not just one person for us, but many more." He knows about the abuse Lynn suffers, but is powerless to do much other than support her in his quiet way due to being Robert's subordinate. He is with her in the aftermath of her beating and defends her from Robert. After years of separation, as he took a job abroad, he returns to the United States and starts a new life wit Lynn and her children.

Josie Bruce's late wife, Lynn's best friend. She was an energetic and charismatic social worker who knew full well what Robert does to Lynn and hates him for it, telling Lynn she deserves better but respecting her decision of staying for the kids. Josie suffered from breast cancer, and had several surgeries throughout the novel till finally she loses her battle and dies. Her last wishes were for Emily to have her money to go to the University she wanted and for Lynn to live a happy and safe life. She liked cats and took very good care of her one pet cat.

Emily Robert and Lynn's eldest daughter. A natural beauty and extremely intelligent young lady, Emily is the responsible and successful teenage daughter of Lynn and Bruce. She has blue eyes, black silky hair, and a tall lean figure. Her dream is to become a social worker or a doctor, and thus help abused women like her mother realize that they are living in a bad situation and to try to get them out of it. She has a steady boyfriend named Harris, who her father hates and disapproves of due to their difference in social class, yet Emily ignores that and loves Harris for who he is. In the middle of te novel she has a spontaneous abortion after three months of pregnancy and has to be rushed to the ER, resulting in her losing the baby and her father on tightening his grip on her as much as he could, prohibiting her from seeing Harris ever again. She refuses to go to the university his father wants her to go and instead makes plans to go to the same university as Harris. His father refuses to pay the tuition and Josie ends up gifting Emily with the last of her money before dying, ensuring the girl can get into the university and be with the man he loves. She's a straight A student, popular, funny and charismatic, who loves her mother and siblings very deeply.

Caroline Robert's and Lynn's second daughter. Lynn said names have colours and Caroline was such a soft shade of gold that it almost looked silver. Lynn was happy with her two daughters, but her happiness was short lived as one day while attending a children's birthday party Caroline wandered off to the end of the house's garden and drowned in the pond. The water was so shallow she could've stood up if she wanted to, so it's possible she fell over and hit her head or was incapacitated some other way. She was pronounced dead on the scene of accidental drowning, leaving Lynn devastated. Robert tried to outwardly make Lynn feel guilty about the whole ordeal, but he was chastised by Lynn's loved ones and instead using Caroline's memory to control Lynn even more through her natural guilt over her death. Emily barely remembers her but what little she does, she remembers her fondly.

Annie Robert's and Lynn's third daughter. She looks more like Lynn with straw blonde hair and a cute freckled face. She has a lot of insecurities, mainly stemming from her father's constant disapproval. She is not as slender and tall as Emily, being more on the chubby side; her grades are poor, she has not talent nor interest for sports, and her life expectations aren't as grand. She however is good at the piano, actually liking to play with her father and practicing without her mother having to insist to much upon it. She's a sweet little girl who only wants her father to love her, but is constantly battling him to let her be who ever she wants to be. She finds solace in Tom Lawrence's words and resolves to be more confident in herself, regardless of her appearance. She witnesses her father's last beating on her mother and is horrified, remembering another beating a long time ago during the halloween when she was around 2. She turns out fine in the end, having the confidence to shout at her father to go away, and realizing she's valuable despite whatever anyone says.

Babby, the yongest child of Robert and Lynn, witnesses his father's final assault on his mother but is too young to remember it.

Ton Lawrence Friend's with Robert's boss, romantically interested in Lynn and later they become friends. He has had many marriages and as many divorces and currently remains single. He's lively, funny, and cares for Lynn. He helps Annie gain confidence in herself. In a charity auction he wins a dinner catered by Lynn, which he pronounces superb. Yet he gets her in trouble with Robert by dancing with her in his backyard during the party in which she served her dinner. Later he admitted that he did have romantic feelings for her. He helps her during her messy divorce and is with her in the aftermath of the beating, keeping Robert from getting near her. He ends their really close friendship due to him not wanting things to develop into something more serious, yet remains friendly with her.

Monacco Robert's boss. He demotes Robert after rumors of his violence towards Lynn leaks out through an anonymous letter. This results in Robert quitting his job. Monacco is a humble, simple man, who yet lives lavishly with his wife in a ranch.

Harris Emily's boyfriend and father of their unborn child. He's a responsible teenager, son of a policeman, who is a straight A student and loves emily very very deeply. He is distraught when Emily is suffering a spontaneous abortion and tries to contact her, but Bruce at first and then Robert prevent him from it, the former to protect him from Robert's fury and the latter to "protect" Emily from him. He ends up going to Tulane, followed by Emily, to be a doctor.

Harris' Father A good natured policeman, the only man aside from Tom and Bruce who has stood up to Robert and told him head on that he knows of the abuse but due to respect and esteem for Emily and Lynn he never proceeded with the reports of violence from their neighbours. He cares deeply for his son and tries to protect him from Robert.

Amada Robert's ex-wife. She's an artist and has her own gallery in New York. Emily approaches her first when Aunt Jean told her about Bruce's first ever son. Later it's Lynn who approaches her, trying to know the truth about Robert's first marriage. Robert abused her just as much as he abused Lynn, resulting in a quarrel in a skating rink where Robert pushed Amada and broke her hip against the hard ice. She never healed well, but refused to be helped by a doctor, keeping her shortened hip and leg as a reminder of Robert's abuse and that she would never let a man abuse her again. She single-handedly raised her son and doesn't want Robert to contact him nor her. Robert hates her very much because in the end she stood up for herself and left him.

Aunt Jean Robert's elderly aunt. He hates her because she talks a lot and he fears she might out the secret of his parents' death and the abuse his father inflicted on his mother. She's sweet and demure and likes Emily very much.
