= Ready Set Roll (EP) =

EP by Chase Rice
- Released: October 15, 2013
- Genre: Country
- Label: Dack Janiels
- Producers: Chad Carlson; Scott Cooke; Chris DeStefano; Rhett Akins (exec.)

Chase Rice chronology
Dirt Road Communion (2012)	Ready Set Roll (2013)	Ignite the Night (2014)

Singles from Ready Set Roll
- 1. "How She Rolls" Released: April 3, 2013; 2. "Ready Set Roll" Released: November 11, 2013

Ready Set Roll is an EP by American country music artist Chase Rice. It was released on October 15, 2013 via Dack Janiels Records.

== Critical reception ==
Matt Bjorke of Roughstock rated the EP 4 out of 5 stars, saying that it is "a strong collection of songs that showcases an artist who is very much of the moment with quite a few of these songs but he also proves that he is more than just the ‘ditties’ that cover trucks, parties and moonlight rides." Giving it 2.5 out of 5, Stephen Thomas Erlewine of Allmusic wrote that "he's such a bro next door that he doesn't cut an impression, not even with songs that purposefully hit all the marks."

== Track listing ==
No.	Title	Writer(s)	Producer	Length
1.	"Ready Set Roll"	Rice; Chris DeStefano; Rhett Akins	DeStefano	3:10
2.	"Party Up" (featuring Colt Ford)	Rice; Blair Daly; Ross Copperman	Scott Cooke	3:15
3.	"Country in Ya"	Rice; Adam Sanders	DeStefano	3:24
4.	"Look at My Truck"	Rice; Cole Taylor	Cooke	3:15
5.	"Best Beers of Our Lives"	Rice; DeStefano; Shane Minor	Cooke	3:27
6.	"How She Rolls"	Rice; Brian Kelley	Chad Carlson	2:58
7.	"Jack Daniels and Jesus" (Physical Release Only)	Rice; Kelley; Amanda Flynn	Cooke	4:41

== Personnel ==
- Nick Buda – drums
- Scott Cooke – bass guitar, drum loop, electric guitar, programming, synthesizer
- Chris DeStefano – bass guitar, drums, acoustic guitar, electric guitar, mandolin, pedal steel guitar, programming
- Colt Ford – vocals on "Party Up"
- Shannon Forrest – drums
- Wes Hightower – background vocals
- Charlie Judge – Hammond B-3 organ, piano, strings, synthesizer
- Rob McNelley – electric guitar
- Russ Pahl – pedal steel guitar
- Chase Rice – lead vocals
- Darren Savard – acoustic guitar, electric guitar
- Ilya Toshinsky – banjo, 12-string guitar, acoustic guitar, baritone guitar, electric guitar, mandolin, slide guitar

== Chart performance ==
=== Weekly charts ===
Chart (2013–14)	Peak position
Canadian Albums (Billboard)	23
US Billboard 200	16
US Top Country Albums (Billboard)	4
US Independent Albums (Billboard)	2

=== Year-end charts ===
Chart (2014)	Position
US Top Country Albums (Billboard)	62
US Independent Albums (Billboard)	48
