= Dirt Road Communion =

Studio album by Chase Rice
- Released: March 20, 2012
- Genre: Country rock
- Length: 59:14
- Label: Dack Janiels
- Producers: Chad Carlson; Brian Kelley; Chase Rice; Jesse Rice

Chase Rice chronology
Bring on Summer (2011)	Dirt Road Communion (2012)	Ready Set Roll (2013)

Singles from Dirt Road Communion
- 1. "Only a Country Girl" Released: February 21, 2012; 2. "How She Rolls" Released: April 3, 2013

Dirt Road Communion is the second studio album by American country music artist Chase Rice. It was released on March 20, 2012, via Dack Janiels Records.

== Critical reception ==
Matt Bjorke of Roughstock rated the album 4 out of 5 stars, saying that "Dirt Road Communion is a diverse, well-crafted modern country album. It showcases Chase Rice as a talented stylist with a conversational, charming singing ability and the ability to connect with both tempo and ballads in a way that makes Chase Rice his own artist and not a carbon copy of anyone else past or present and that, my friends, is a true mark of an artist ready to burst into stardom.".

== Commercial performance ==
In April 2012, the album peaked at number 48 on the Billboard Country Albums chart.

== Track listing ==
No.	Title	Writer(s)	Length
1.	"Dirt Road Communion"	Chase Rice; Brandon Kinney; Brian Kelley	3:36
2.	"How She Rolls"	Rice; Kelley	2:57
3.	"The Little Things"	Rice; Kelley	2:18
4.	"PBJ's & PBR's"	C. Rice; Jesse Rice; Kelley	3:17
5.	"Whoa"	C. Rice; J. Rice; Russell Dickerson; Tyler Hubbard; Kelley	3:15
6.	"Room 205"	C. Rice; Scooter Carusoe	5:29
7.	"Pop a Top Off (Good Time On)"	C. Rice; J. Rice; Kelley	2:48
8.	"Shades of Green"	C. Rice; J. Rice; Kelley; Jaron Boyer	3:34
9.	"You Ain't Livin' Yet"	Boyer; Ben Stennis	3:01
10.	"Country Boy's Kryptonite"	C. Rice; J. Rice; Hubbard; Kelley	3:09
11.	"Every Song I Sing"	Rice	3:02
12.	"Only a Country Girl"	Rice; Hubbard; Kelley; Dickerson	3:33
13.	"I Like Drinking, Cause It's Fun"	C. Rice; J. Rice; Hubbard; Kelley	3:13
14.	"Shakin' the Wheels"	Rice	3:38
15.	"Jack Daniels & Jesus"	Rice; Kelley; Amanda Flynn	4:41
16.	"Happy Hour (Worktape)"	Rice; Kelley	3:52
17.	"Kiss My Ass" (hidden track)	Rice; Kelley	3:21

=== Notes ===
- "How She Rolls" and "Whoa" were removed from digital/streaming platforms and as such are exclusive to the album's physical release.

== Personnel ==
Adapted from Dirt Road Communion liner notes.

=== Musicians ===
- Kelly Back – acoustic guitar, electric guitar
- Brian Bonds – electric guitar
- Steve Brewster – drums
- Bob Britt – electric guitar
- Steve Bryant – bass guitar
- Nick Buda – drums
- Chad Carlson – bass guitar, acoustic guitar, electric guitar, background vocals
- Perry Coleman – background vocals
- Mike Durham – electric guitar
- Lindsey Hager – background vocals
- Tommy Harden – drums
- Dennis Holt – drums
- Wayne Killius – drums
- Troy Lancaster – electric guitar
- Rob McNelley – electric guitar
- John Osborne – acoustic guitar
- Chase Rice – acoustic guitar, lead vocals
- Curt Ryle – acoustic guitar
- Mike Severs – electric guitar
- Adam Shoenfeld – electric guitar
- Gary Smith – Hammond B-3 organ, keyboards, piano
- Wanda Vick – banjo, dobro, fiddle, mandolin

=== Technical ===
- Chase Rice — producer (all tracks except 2)
- Brian Kelley — producer (all tracks except 2)
- Jesse Rice — producer (tracks 5–8, 11–12, and 14)
- Chad Carlson — producer (tracks 2 and 9), recording/mixing (track 2)
- A.J. Derrick — recording
- Dave Sally — recording
- Eric Green — recording, mixing, mastering
- Brandon Shattuck — recording
- Andi Mans Photography & Design — photography and design
- Lauren Ledbetter — logo design

== Chart performance ==
Chart (2012)	Peak position
US Top Country Albums (Billboard)	48
US Heatseekers Albums (Billboard)	15
