= WSPR =

WSPR may refer to:

- WSPR (AM), a radio station (1490 AM) licensed to serve West Springfield, Massachusetts, United States
- WACM (AM), a radio station (1270 AM) licensed to serve Springfield, Massachusetts, which held the call sign WSPR from 1936 to 2016
- WSPR (amateur radio software), protocol for weak signal propagation
- Williams-Shapps Plan for Rail, a UK government plan to create Great British Railways, a state-owned public body to oversee most rail transport in Great Britain
