= Ready Set Roll =

Single by Chase Rice

from the album Ready Set Roll and Ignite the Night
- Released: November 11, 2013
- Recorded: 2013
- Genre: Country rock
- Length: 3:10
- Label: Dack Janiels; RPM; Columbia Nashville
- Songwriters: Chris DeStefano; Rhett Akins; Chase Rice
- Producer: Chris DeStefano

Chase Rice singles chronology
"How She Rolls" (2013)	"Ready Set Roll" (2013)	"The High Life" (2014)

"Ready Set Roll" is a song recorded by American country music artist Chase Rice. It was released in November 2013 as his first single from his EP album of the same name, and later appeared on his first major-label studio album, Ignite the Night. Rice wrote the song with Chris DeStefano, who also produced it, and Rhett Akins.

== Critical reception ==
In his review of the EP, Matt Bjorke of Roughstock wrote, "Over-used theme? Maybe. But the song is still very strong." Jonathan Keefe of Country Universe rated the song "F", criticizing its clichéd lyrics and objectification of women, also saying that "thanks to a dated, cheap-sounding production job and Rice’s limited vocal ability, 'Ready Set Roll' doesn’t even work as a throwaway, escapist single."

== Commercial performance ==
"Ready Set Roll" debuted on Billboard Hot 100 at #100, and Hot Country Songs at No. 27 the song's release. It was the second best-selling country songs with 42,000 copies sold on its debut week. The song debuted at number 57 on the U.S. Billboard Country Airplay chart for the week of November 30, 2013. RPM Management promoted the song to radio alongside Rice's own label, Dack Janiels, until March 2014 when Columbia Records Nashville assumed promotion in partnership with Thirty Tigers and RED Distribution. It peaked at No. 54 on the Hot 100 for chart dated October 11, 2014, No. 5 on the Country Airplay chart at No. 5 the following week, and No. 5 on the Hot Country Songs for the chart of November 1, 2014.

The song was certified Platinum by the RIAA on November 18, 2014, and reached its million sales mark in the US in March 2015. As of July 2015, the song has sold 1,060,000 copies in the US.

== Music video ==
The video was released on January 29, 2014. It was directed by Jeff Ray and included live footage from several of Rice's shows on the Ready Set Roll Tour.

== Charts ==
=== Weekly charts ===
Chart (2013–2014)	Peak position
Canada Hot 100 (Billboard)	40
Canada Country (Billboard)	29
US Billboard Hot 100	54
US Country Airplay (Billboard)	5
US Hot Country Songs (Billboard)	5

=== Year-end charts ===
Chart (2014)	Position
US Country Airplay (Billboard)	5
US Hot Country Songs (Billboard)	18

== Certifications ==
Certifications for "Ready Set Roll"
Region	Certification	Certified units/sales
United States (RIAA)	2× Platinum	1,060,000
