= Eyes on You (Chase Rice song) =

2018 single by Chase Rice

Single by Chase Rice

from the album Lambs & Lions
- Released: August 13, 2018
- Recorded: 2017
- Genre: Country
- Length: 3:02
- Label: Dack Janiels / Broken Bow
- Songwriters: Chris DeStefano; Ashley Gorley; Chase Rice
- Producers: DeStefano; Jacquire King

Chase Rice singles chronology
"Three Chords & the Truth" (2017)	"Eyes on You" (2018)	"Lonely If You Are" (2019)

"Eyes on You" is a song co-written and recorded by American country music artist Chase Rice. It was released to radio on August 13, 2018, as the second and final single from his second studio album Lambs & Lions (2017). The song was written by Rice, Chris DeStefano and Ashley Gorley. "Eyes on You" gave Rice his first number-one hit on the Billboard Country Airplay chart. It also reached numbers three and 38 on both the Hot Country Songs and Hot 100 charts respectively. It was certified 3× Platinum by the Recording Industry Association of America (RIAA), and has sold 77,000 copies in the United States as of April 2019. The song also charted in Canada, reaching number six on the Canada Country chart and number 73 on the Canadian Hot 100 chart. It received a Gold certification from Music Canada, denoting sales of 40,000 units in that country. An accompanying music video for the song, directed by Brian Lazarro, featured Rice's former girlfriend.

== Content ==
The song is about an actual experience that Rice had with a female friend in Hawaii. The song expresses nostalgia about experiencing a special night with a lover. It is accompanied mainly by keyboard and guitar. Rice said of the song, "It's got an unbelievable melody to it, and then the storyline -- everyday wants that. Every guy wants to look at a girl like that. Every girl wants her guy looking at her like that. So I think it just connects to people in terms of what they want in life. It's probably my biggest song as an artist to date."

== Commercial performance ==
On the week of May 5, 2018, "Eyes on You" debuted at number 49 on the Billboard Hot Country Songs chart. It also debuted at number 54 on the Billboard Country Airplay chart the week of August 25. On the Hot 100, the song debuted at number 84 the week of March 2, 2019. It reached number three on the Hot Country Songs chart the week of April 27, staying there for 41 weeks. On the week of May 11, the song reached number one on the Country Airplay chart, also remaining there for 41 weeks. That same week, it peaked at number 38 on the Hot 100, staying on the chart for 20 weeks. It was certified triple platinum by the RIAA on May 31, 2023. The track has sold 77,000 copies in the United States as of April 2019.

In Canada, "Eyes on You" debuted at number 48 on the Billboard Canada Country chart the week of February 16, 2019. It also debuted at number 85 on the Canadian Hot 100 the week of May 11. The following week, the song peaked at number six on the Canada Country chart, staying there for 20 weeks. It reached number 73 on the Canadian Hot 100 the week of May 25, and remained there for four weeks. The track was certified gold by Music Canada on February 1, 2019.

== Music video ==
The song received a music video, which features his former girlfriend. He tore a pectoral muscle while shooting the video. Brian Lazarro directed the video, which was filmed in Mammoth Lakes, CA.

== Live performance ==
On February 27, 2019, Rice performed "Eyes on You" on Good Morning America.

== Charts ==
=== Weekly charts ===
Chart (2018–2019)	Peak position
Canada Hot 100 (Billboard)	73
Canada Country (Billboard)	6
US Billboard Hot 100	38
US Country Airplay (Billboard)	1
US Hot Country Songs (Billboard)	3

=== Year-end charts ===
Chart (2019)	Position
US Billboard Hot 100	96
US Country Airplay (Billboard)	23
US Hot Country Songs (Billboard)	20

== Certifications ==
Region	Certification	Certified units/sales
Canada (Music Canada)	Gold	40,000^{‡}
United States (RIAA)	3× Platinum	3,000,000^{‡}
^{‡} Sales+streaming figures based on certification alone.
