= Lambs & Lions =

Studio album by Chase Rice
- Released: November 17, 2017
- Genres: Country pop; country rock
- Label: Broken Bow
- Producers: Ross Copperman; Chris DeStefano; Jacquire King; Mac McAnally

Chase Rice chronology
Ignite the Night (2014)	Lambs & Lions (2017)	The Album (2021)

Singles from Lambs & Lions
- 1. "Three Chords & the Truth" Released: August 14, 2017; 2. "Eyes on You" Released: August 13, 2018

Lambs & Lions is the fourth studio album by American country music artist Chase Rice. After being delayed, it was released on November 17, 2017, by Broken Bow Records. Rice began a concert tour for the album on September 14, 2017.

== Commercial performance ==
The album debuted at No. 42 on the Billboard 200, and No. 6 on Top Country Albums, with 12,100 copies sold in the first week. It has sold 26,900 copies in the United States as of April 2019.

== Track listing ==
No.	Title	Writer(s)	Producer(s)	Length
1.	"Lions"	Chase Rice; Chris DeStefano; Ashley Gorley	DeStefano	4:06
2.	"On Tonight"	Jessie Jo Dillon; Chase McGill; Jon Nite	DeStefano	4:02
3.	"Unforgettable"	C. Rice; Josh Miller; Steven Lee Olsen; David Garcia	DeStefano	3:39
4.	"Eyes on You"	C. Rice; DeStefano; Gorley	DeStefano; Jacquire King	3:02
5.	"Saved Me"	Rice; MCV; Josh Hoge	King	3:29
6.	"One Love, One Kiss, One Drink, One Song"	C. Rice; Jesse Rice	King	3:17
7.	"Jack Daniel's Showed Up"	C. Rice; DeStefano; Gorley	DeStefano	3:04
8.	"Three Chords & the Truth"	C. Rice; Ross Copperman; Nite	Copperman	3:54
9.	"Amen"	Rodney Clawson; Jamie Moore	King	3:56
10.	"This Cowboy's Hat" (featuring Ned LeDoux)	Jake Brooks	DeStefano; Mac McAnally	5:05

Worldwide Deluxe (Digital/Streaming only)
No.	Title	Writer(s)	Length
11.	"On Tonight" (UK Edition)	Dillon; McGill; Nite	3:40
12.	"25 Wexford St."	C. Rice; DeStefano; Jim Beavers	2:54
13.	"Eyes on You" (acoustic)	C. Rice; DeStefano; Gorley	2:54
14.	"Love Me Like You Don't"	Greg Bates; Michael White; Shelley Skidmore	3:44

== Charts ==
=== Album ===
==== Weekly charts ====
Chart (2017)	Peak position
Australian Albums (ARIA)	98
US Billboard 200	42
US Top Country Albums (Billboard)	6

==== Year-end charts ====
Chart (2019)	Position
US Top Country Albums (Billboard)	65
