= Chris LeDoux =

American country singer (1948–2005)

- LeDoux in 1999

Background information
- Born: Christopher Lee LeDoux; October 2, 1948; Biloxi, Mississippi, U.S.
- Origin: Cheyenne, Wyoming, U.S.
- Died: March 9, 2005 (aged 56) Casper, Wyoming, U.S.
- Genres: Country; country rock; Western music
- Occupations: Musician; singer-songwriter; rodeo competitor
- Instruments: Vocals; guitar; harmonica
- Years active: 1971–2005
- Labels: Liberty; Capitol; American Cowboy Songs

Christopher Lee LeDoux (October 2, 1948 – March 9, 2005) was an American country music singer-songwriter, bronze sculptor, and hall of fame rodeo champion. During his career, LeDoux recorded 36 albums (many self-released), which have sold more than six million units in the United States as of January 2007. He was awarded two gold and one platinum album certifications from the Recording Industry Association of America (RIAA), was nominated for a Grammy Award, and was honored with the Academy of Country Music Cliffie Stone Pioneer Award. LeDoux is also the only person to participate and also perform at the Houston Livestock Show and Rodeo.

== Biography ==
=== Early years ===
Christopher Lee LeDoux was born in Biloxi, Mississippi, on October 2, 1948 to Bonnie (née Gingrich; 1927–2022) and Alfred LeDoux (1923–1995). He was of French descent on his father's side. His father was in the US Air Force and was stationed at Keesler Air Force Base at the time of his birth. The family moved often when he was a child, due to his father's Air Force career. He learned to ride horses while visiting his grandparents on their Wyoming farm. At age 13, LeDoux participated in his first rodeo, and before long was winning junior rodeo competitions.

LeDoux continued to compete in rodeo events and played football through his high-school years. When his family moved to Cheyenne, Wyoming, he attended Cheyenne Central High School. After twice winning the Wyoming State Rodeo Championship bareback riding title during high school, LeDoux earned a rodeo scholarship to Casper College in Casper. During his junior year at Eastern New Mexico University, LeDoux won the Intercollegiate National bareback bronc riding championship.

LeDoux married Peggy Rhoads on January 4, 1972. They had five children: Clay, Ned, Will, Beau, and Cindy.

=== Rodeo success and music beginnings ===
In 1970, LeDoux became a professional rodeo cowboy on the national circuit. To help pay his expenses while traveling the country, he began composing songs describing his lifestyle. Within two years, he had written enough songs to make up an album, and soon established a recording company, American Cowboy Songs, with his father. After recording his songs in a friend's basement, LeDoux "began selling his tapes at rodeo events out of the back of his pickup truck".

In 1976, LeDoux won the world bareback riding championship at the National Finals Rodeo in Oklahoma City. Winning the championship gave LeDoux more credibility with music audiences, as he now had proof that the cowboy songs he wrote were authentic. LeDoux continued competing for the next four years. He retired in 1980.

=== Music career ===
With his rodeo career at an end, LeDoux and his family settled on a ranch in Kaycee, Wyoming. LeDoux continued to write and record his songs, and began playing concerts. His concerts were very popular, and often featured a mechanical bull (which he rode between songs) and fireworks. By 1982, he had sold more than 250,000 copies of his albums, with little or no marketing. By the end of the decade, he had self-released 22 albums.

Despite offers from various record labels, LeDoux refused to sign a recording contract, instead choosing to retain his independence and control over his work while enjoying his regional following. In 1989, however, he shot to national prominence when he was mentioned in Garth Brooks' top-10 country hit "Much Too Young (To Feel This Damn Old)". Capitalizing on the sudden attention, LeDoux signed a contract with Capitol Records subsidiary Liberty Records and released his first national album, Western Underground, in 1991. His follow-up album, Whatcha Gonna Do with a Cowboy, was certified gold and reached the top 10. The title track, a duet with Brooks, became LeDoux's first and only top-10 country single, reaching number seven in 1992. In concert, he ended the song by saying, "Thanks, Garth!"

For the 35th annual Grammy Awards in 1992, the single track "Whatcha Gonna Do with a Cowboy" was nominated for Best Country Vocal Collaboration. LeDoux and Brooks also received nominations from the Academy of Country Music for Vocal Duo of the Year and from the TNN/Music City News Country Awards for Vocal Collaboration of the Year.

For the next decade, LeDoux continued to record for Liberty. He released six additional records, including One Road Man, which made the country top 40 in 1998. On that same year, Ledoux covered "Bang a Drum", with Jon Bon Jovi performing guest vocals. The guitar solo was performed by guitar virtuoso Shawn Lane. It was featured on LeDoux's One Road Man album, produced by Trey Bruce and reached number 68 on the US Hot Country Songs. This version also features a music video. Toward the end of his career, LeDoux began recording material written by other artists, which he attributed to the challenge of composing new lyrics. With his 2000 release, Cowboy, he returned to his roots, re-recording many of his earliest songwriting creations.

The RIAA certified two gold and one platinum recordings for LeDoux. On February 22, 1993, the single "Whatcha Gonna Do with a Cowboy" went gold. On June 2, 1997, the album The Best of Chris LeDoux went gold. And on October 5, 2005, the album 20 Greatest Hits went platinum.

=== Illness and death ===
In August 2000, LeDoux was diagnosed with primary sclerosing cholangitis, which required him to receive a liver transplant. Garth Brooks volunteered to donate part of his liver, but it was incompatible. An alternative donor was located, and LeDoux received a transplant on October 7, 2000. After his recovery, he released two additional albums. In November 2004, LeDoux was diagnosed with bile duct cancer, for which he underwent radiation treatment until his death.

LeDoux died of cancer on March 9, 2005, at age 56. His funeral was held on March 11.

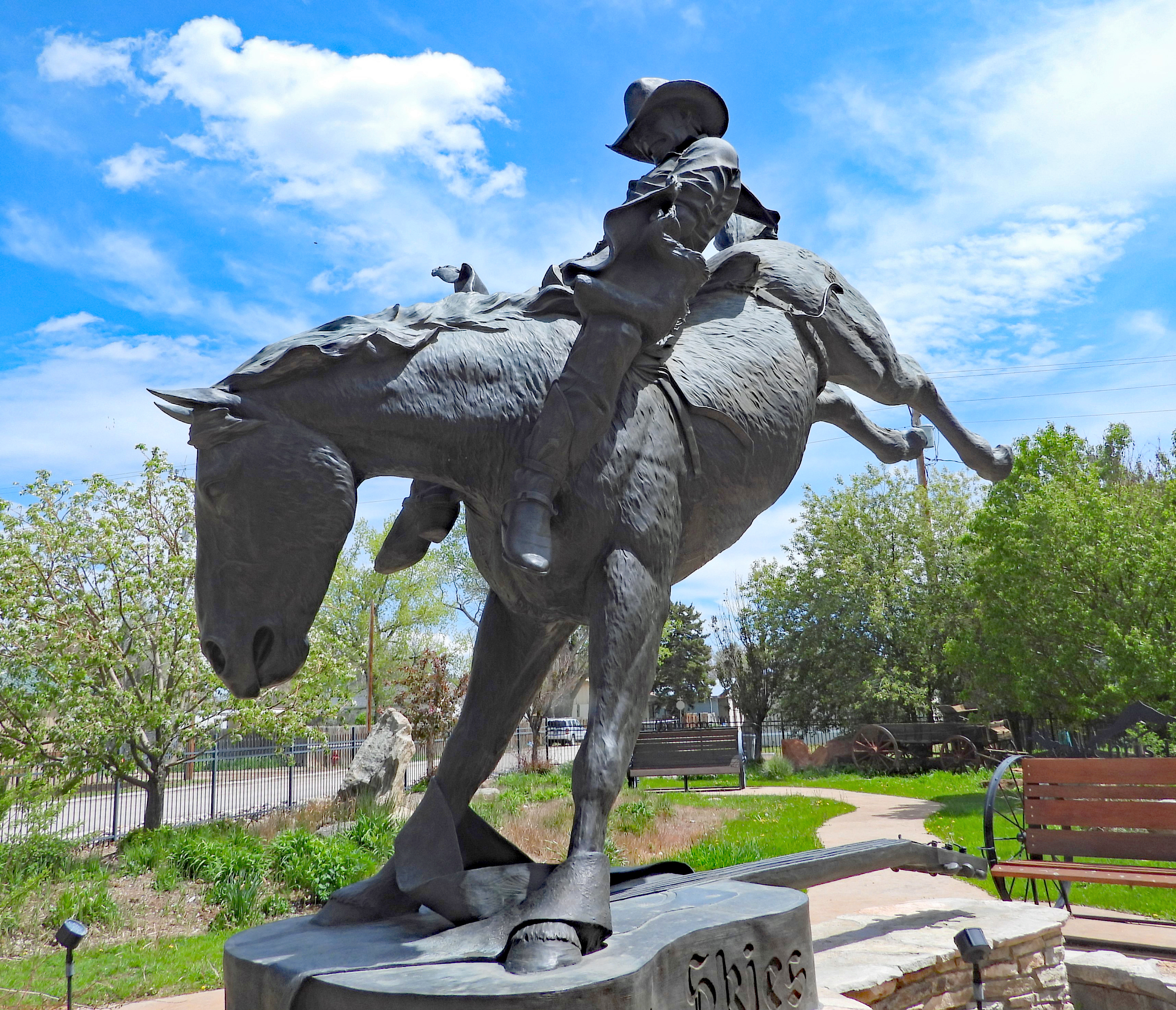
"Good Ride Cowboy" Sculpture in Kaycee, Wyoming.

== Tributes ==
Shortly after his death, LeDoux was named as one of six former rodeo cowboys to be inducted into the ProRodeo Hall of Fame in Colorado Springs, Colorado, in 2005. He was the first person to be inducted in two categories, for his bareback riding and in the "notables" category "for his contributions to the sport through his music".

In 2004, the Academy of Country Music awarded LeDoux their Cliffie Stone Pioneer Award during ceremonies. In 2005, Garth Brooks accepted the award on behalf of LeDoux's family.

In late 2005, Brooks briefly emerged from retirement to record "Good Ride Cowboy" as a tribute to LeDoux. Brooks remarked:

"I knew if I ever recorded any kind of tribute to Chris, it would have to be up-tempo, happy ... a song like him ... not some slow, mournful song. He wasn't like that. Chris was exactly as our heroes are supposed to be. He was a man's man. A good friend."

Garth Brooks performed the song on the 39th Annual CMA Awards on November 15, 2005, live from Times Square in New York City. Later that evening, LeDoux was honored with the CMA Chairman's Award of Merit, presented by Kix Brooks of Brooks & Dunn, to LeDoux's family.

Friends have also collaborated to produce an annual rodeo, art show, and concert in Casper, Wyoming to honor LeDoux's memory. The art show features sculpture and sketches that LeDoux completed for friends; none of his works were ever officially exhibited before his death. However, LeDoux did have two pieces of sculpture that won awards while he was alive; it was more than just a hobby.

To mark the second anniversary of LeDoux's death, in April 2007, Capitol Records released six CDs featuring remastered versions of 12 of the albums he recorded between 1974 and 1993.

Artist and sculptor D. Michael Thomas created a one-and-a-half times life-size sculpture of Chris LeDoux during his 1976 World Championship ride on Stormy Weather. The statue, called "Good Ride Cowboy", is on display at the Chris LeDoux Memorial Park in his hometown of Kaycee, Wyoming.

Son Beau LeDoux, himself a rodeo competitor, on July 24, 2007, spread his father's ashes over Frontier Park Arena during the annual Cheyenne Frontier Days rodeo.

The city in which LeDoux attended college, Casper, Wyoming, celebrates LeDoux each November with the Chris LeDoux Memorial Rodeo, a weekend event that includes an art show featuring a number of LeDoux's works, a PRCA rodeo, and a country music concert.

In 2010, Robert Royston created One Ride, a music and dance production that tells the story of the rodeo cowboy.

In 2010, country singer Luke Kaufman paid tribute to LeDoux in his song Broncin' from the album Cowboy Baller, "Soakin' up tapes of Chris LeDoux".

In 2011, country music artist Brantley Gilbert paid tribute to LeDoux in his single "Country Must Be Country Wide", with the line "From his Wranglers to his boots – he reminded me of Chris LeDoux".

In 2021, a bronze statue of LeDoux was placed at Cheyenne Frontier Days in Frontier Park in his honor. It is a large statue sculpted by Buffalo sculptor D. Michael Thomas. It is titled Just LeDoux It. It was unveiled at the opening of Frontier Days, during the celebration of its 125th anniversary. The statue displays LeDoux on a bucking bronc, and also depicts a guitar. Fellow musical artist Garth Brooks and Chris's son Ned LeDoux attended the unveiling.

From 2011 thru 2025, the town of Kaycee, Wyoming hosted Chris LeDoux Days, a festival held along Nolan Avenue featuring a rodeo and live music performances headlined by Chris's son, Ned.

== Rodeo honors ==
Year	Honor
2003	Cheyenne Frontier Days and Old West Museum Hall of Fame
2005	Inducted into the ProRodeo Hall of Fame as Bareback Bronc Rider and Notable
2006	Rodeo Hall of Fame at the National Cowboy & Western Heritage Museum in Oklahoma City, Oklahoma
2007	Texas Trail of Fame historic Fort Worth Stockyards in Fort Worth, Texas.
2009	Wyoming Sports Hall of Fame
2012	Cowboy Keeper

== Rodeo career milestones ==
Year	Event
1964	National Little Britches Rodeo Association Bareback World Championship
1967	Wyoming State High School Bareback Bronc Championship
1969	National Intercollegiate Rodeo Association Bareback Riding Champion
1976	Professional Rodeo Cowboys Association Bareback World Championship
1986	Officially retired from rodeo competition

== Awards and nominations ==
Year	Organization	Award	Nominee/Work	Result
1993	Grammy Awards	Best Country Collaboration with Vocals	"Whatcha Gonna Do with a Cowboy" with Garth Brooks	Nominated
1993	Academy of Country Music Awards	Top Vocal Duo of the Year	Chris LeDoux and Garth Brooks	Nominated
2005	Academy of Country Music Awards	Cliffie Stone Pioneer Award	Chris LeDoux	Won
