= Chase Rice =

American singer-songwriter and football player

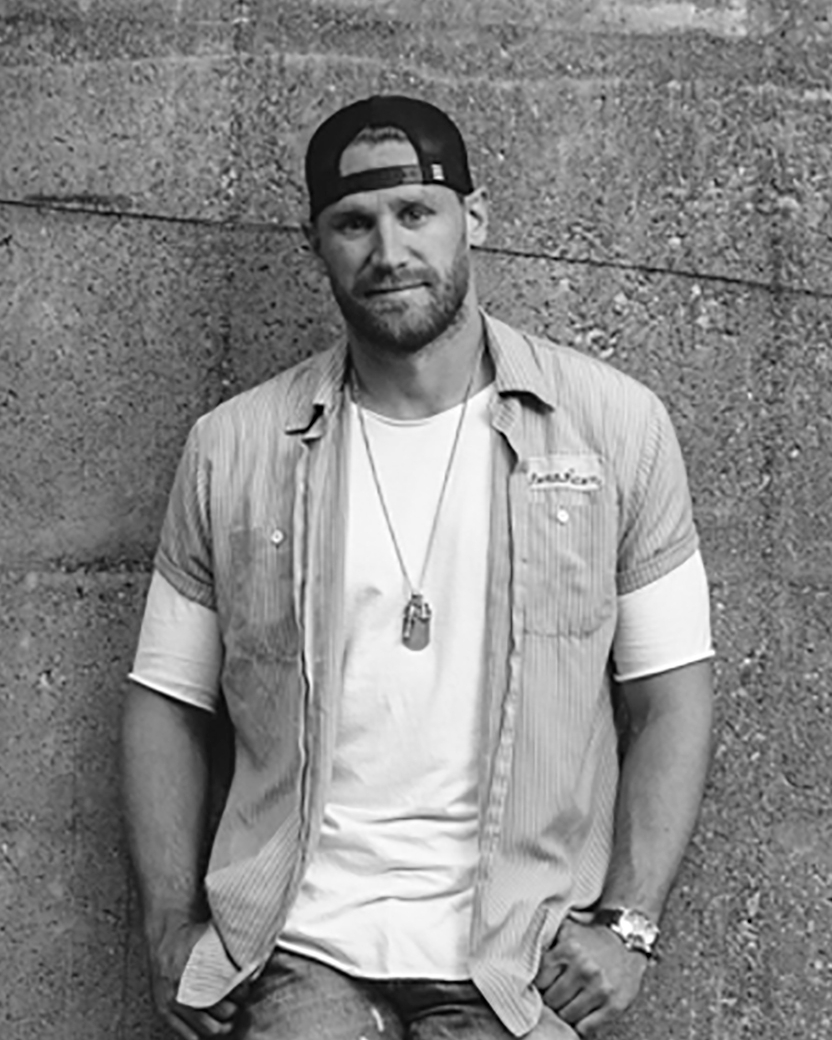
- Rice in 2016

Background information
- Born: September 19, 1985 (age 41); Ormond Beach, Florida
- Origin: Asheville, North Carolina, U.S.
- Genres: Country pop; country rock
- Occupations: Singer; songwriter
- Instruments: Vocals; guitar
- Years active: 2010–present
- Labels: Dack Janiels; Columbia Nashville; BBR
- Website: chaserice.com

Chase Rice (born September 19, 1985) is an American country music singer, songwriter and reality television personality. He first came to prominence in 2010 while he was a contestant on Survivor: Nicaragua, where he was the runner-up to Jud "Fabio" Birza. In the same year Rice began focusing on a career in country music; later he co-wrote the diamond-certified single "Cruise," performed by Florida Georgia Line.

Rice has released six studio albums, and his third album, Ignite the Night, debuted atop the Billboard Top Country Albums chart. He has also scored two number-one singles on the Country Airplay chart with "Eyes on You" and "Drinkin' Beer. Talkin' God. Amen." (featuring Florida Georgia Line). Prior to 2010, Rice was a former college football linebacker for the North Carolina Tar Heels and a former NASCAR pit crew member for Hendrick Motorsports.

== Early life, education, and early career ==
Born in Florida, Rice was raised on a farm in Asheville, North Carolina. He attended AC Reynolds High School and the University of North Carolina at Chapel Hill where he was a linebacker on the football team. He did not pursue an NFL career due to injury.

After graduating from UNC, Rice was selected to join the Hendrick Motorsports pit crew as the rear tire carrier for Ryan Newman's Nationwide Series car. He also worked on Jimmie Johnson's Sprint Cup Series car and won two championships with the Lowe's team.

== Survivor ==
Rice was selected as a cast member of the reality television show Survivor: Nicaragua. He said that he was able to get his application into CBS through a college friend who had a connection with the network.

Rice was originally on the La Flor tribe, consisting of younger contestants. During his time on the tribe, he was quickly attracted to fellow contestant Brenda Lowe, who became aware of his attraction and used it to her advantage, recruiting him and several others into an alliance. After La Flor won three of the first four tribal immunity challenges, the tribes were blended and Rice ended up on the new version of the original "older contestants" tribe, Espada, while Lowe remained on the new version of the La Flor tribe. Rice and Lowe both ultimately made it to the merged group, Libertad, where their alliance successfully caused the eliminations of Alina Wilson and Marty Piombo, before turning on Lowe and eliminating her as a threat. Following Lowe's elimination, Rice continued with the alliance under new leader Matthew "Sash" Lenahan. After two contestants (NaOnka Mixon and "Purple Kelly" Shinn) quit, the alliance continued eliminating targets Ben "Benry" Henry, Jane Bright, Dan Lembo, and Holly Hoffman, although Bright and Hoffman were members of the alliance. The alliance tried to eliminate Jud "Fabio" Birza as a threat against the jury, but Birza managed to evade them by winning the last three immunity challenges. Rice performed exceptionally well in the post-merge challenges, being on the winning team in two of the three team-oriented rewards, and winning the last two individual rewards. Eventually, Rice made it to the final three with Lenahan and Birza, where he had a chance to win the $1 million as "Sole Survivor". In pleading his case to the jury, Rice claimed that he was being open about how he played the game, but was criticized both for his rash decisions and occasional indecisiveness, as well as being perceived as a follower under both Lowe and Lenahan. Although both Rice and Lenahan tried to accuse Birza of not knowing what was going on in the competition, the jury still ultimately chose Birza who received five of the nine votes; Rice received the votes of Hoffman, Bright, Lowe, and Wilson.

On the nationally televised reunion show, Rice played his single "Buzz Back". Although he received national media attention on the show, he says that reality show stardom did not help propel his country music career; instead, he cited it as an important life event that was more valuable than money and that put his life in perspective.

In the official issue of CBS Watch magazine, commemorating the 15th anniversary of Survivor in 2015, Rice was voted by viewers as the 10th "steamiest" male contestant in Survivor history.

== Country music career ==
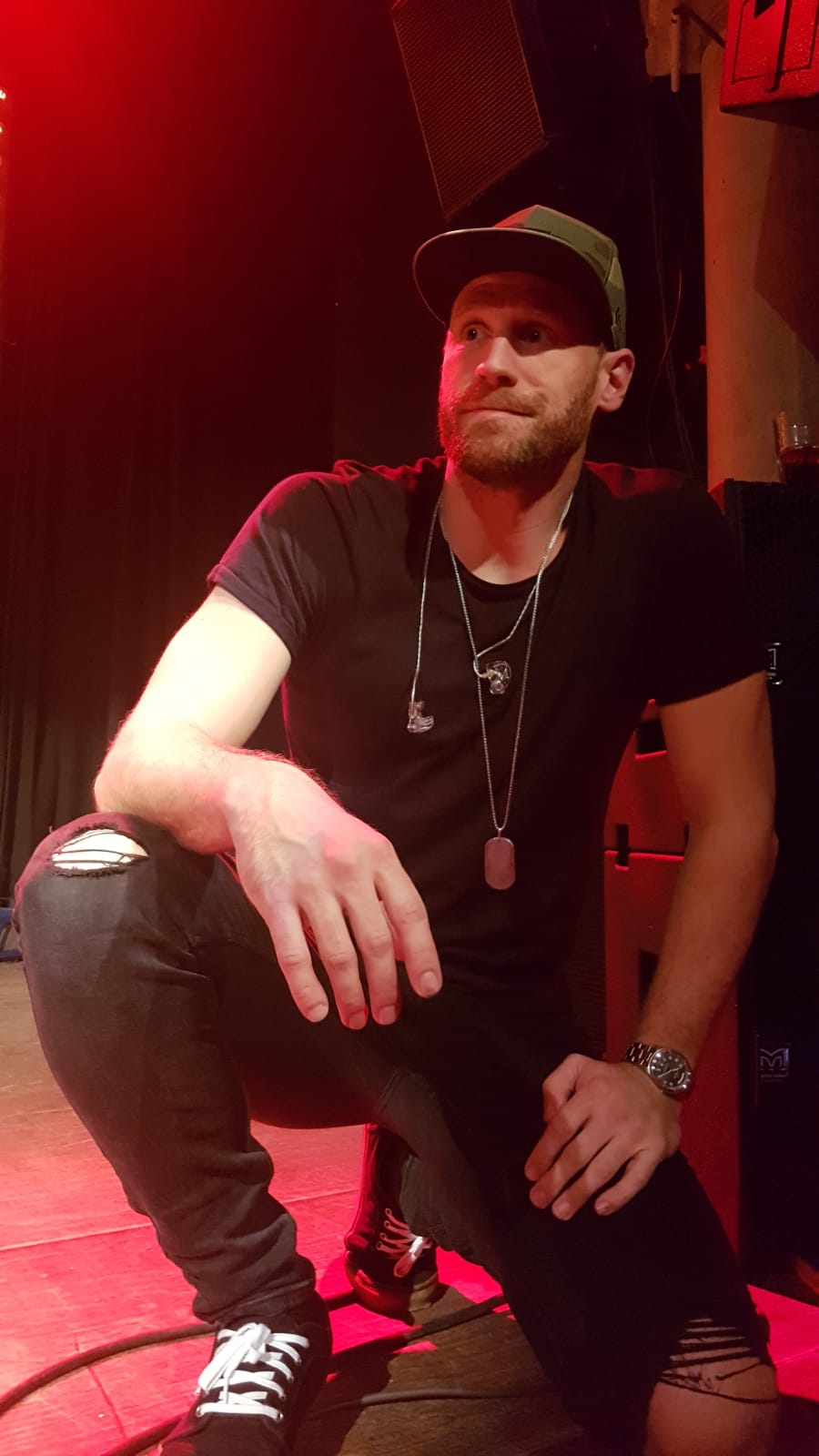
Rice in 2020

Chase Rice began playing guitar in college. He cites his father as the inspiration for his career, recalling his father saying "boy anyone can play guitar, but no one is gonna really listen to you until you start singing." He creates his albums based on the live shows he has and is building his career through performing. His first studio album, Friday Nights & Sunday Mornings, was released on April 22, 2010. This 13-track album includes the first song he ever wrote/recorded, "Larger Than Life", which is about the passing of his father. This is the only full-length album Rice has released that is not available for digital purchase or streaming.

In March 2011, he released Country as Me, a six-track EP featuring his single "Buzz Back". He has received air play as a "Highway Find" on satellite radio channel The Highway. In April 2012, his second studio album Dirt Road Communion debuted at number 48 on the Billboard Country Albums chart. This album included the original recordings of "Jack Daniels and Jesus" and "How She Rolls", the latter of which has been removed from streaming and digital platforms in its original form. "Whoa" has also been removed from all digital and streaming platforms, but was never re-released leaving the current total tracks on the album at 14. "Happy Hour (Worktape)" includes a hidden track, "Kiss My Ass", which begins at the 4:31 minute mark on the song.

In July 2012, he signed with Creative Artists Agency. He was a co-writer of Florida Georgia Line's "Cruise" which topped Billboard Hot Country Songs.

In October 2013, he released Ready Set Roll, a six-song EP including the title track. The physical version of the album was released in November 2013 and included the bonus song "Jack Daniel's and Jesus". On January 29, 2014, the official "Ready Set Roll" music video premiered exclusively on CMT. The next day the video debuted on VEVO. He partnered with Columbia Records for distribution of "Ready Set Roll" in March 2014.

On June 30, 2014, Rice released the album cover, release date, and album sequence for Ignite the Night. The full-length album was released on August 19, 2014, and included the platinum-certified single, "Ready Set Roll".

In February 2016, Rice released "Whisper", which was intended to be the lead single from an upcoming album. The song was unsuccessful commercially, peaking at number 56 on the week of April 23, 2016, after just 3 weeks of being on the Country Airplay chart. It is currently the single which has peaked the lowest for Rice only behind "How She Rolls" which peaked at number 55 in 2013, and never received real label backing. After releasing the single, Rice issued a letter to his fans which said, "If you have listened to my music for years and want to hear more depth and meaning, I very much appreciate you, too, and your desires will also be fulfilled on this album (and truthfully, that was my goal on previous albums with songs like "Carolina Can" and "Every Song I Sing")." He went on to mention that he was influenced by Garth Brooks and Kenny Chesney. Rice then released "Everybody We Know Does", which was sent to country radio on June 24, 2016.

After "Everybody We Know Does" failed to crack the top 25, Rice left Columbia in 2017 and signed to Broken Bow Records the same year. The lead single from Rice's first album with BBR, "Three Chords and the Truth", was sent to country radio. This single was highly praised by both country fans and radio, as this was his first single to crack the Top 25 on the Country Airplay chart in 4 years. Lambs & Lions is Rice's first album on Broken Bow Records/BMG and is also the first album released by BBR since the BMG takeover. The album was released on November 17, 2017.

Rice's single "Eyes on You" became his first number one on country radio on May 6, 2019, staying at the top for two weeks. He then released the follow-up single "Lonely If You Are" on July 1, 2019. Rice also wrote and performed the inaugural theme song for The Pat McAfee Show, which was used from September 10, 2019, to April 30, 2020.

Rice appeared on the fourth episode of season 24 of The Bachelor, performing at a private concert for bachelor Peter Weber and his date, Victoria Fuller, at Cedar Point in Sandusky, Ohio. Fuller later revealed that she had previously dated Rice.

On June 27, 2020, Rice played a concert at the Brushy Mountain State Penitentiary, in Petros, Tennessee, where many fans chose to ignore recommended safety measures against spreading and contracting COVID-19. Reaction to the concert drew negative outcry from fans and the music industry. In response to the criticism Rice stated: "If it were up to me I wouldn't cancel one damn show, but it ain't.... I personally, choose not to live scared, especially of something that I can't really control."

In November 2020, Rice released the single "Drinkin' Beer. Talkin' God. Amen." featuring his long-time friends Florida Georgia Line. It is the second single from Rice's fifth studio album, The Album, which was released on May 28, 2021.

In November 2022, Rice announced his sixth studio album I Hate Cowboys & All Dogs Go to Hell, which was released in February 2023. The sole single from the album, "Bad Day to Be a Cold Beer", was released in May and music videos were produced for "Bench Seat", "Way Down Yonder" and "I Hate Cowboys". During the year, Rice promoted the album on the Way Down Yonder tour, and was a supporting act for Jelly Roll and Old Dominion. In early 2024, Rice embarked on his headlining "Get Western Tour" across Canada and the Pacific Northwest, with Owen Riegling and Palmer Anthony as supporting acts.

== Discography ==
- Friday Nights and Sunday Mornings (2010)
- Dirt Road Communion (2012)
- Ignite the Night (2014)
- Lambs & Lions (2017)
- The Album (2021)
- I Hate Cowboys & All Dogs Go to Hell (2023)
- Go Down Singin (2024)
- ‘’ELDORA’’ (2025)

== Tours ==
Supporting

- The Big Revival Tour with Kenny Chesney (2015)
- Backroad Baptism Tour with Jelly Roll (2023)
- No Bad Vibes Tour with Old Dominion (2023)

Headlining

- Jack Daniels and Jesus Tour with The Cadillac Three (2015)
- Campus Events Network Presents College Days, Country Nights: Chase Rice Back to College Tour (2016)
- Everybody We Know Does Tour with Ryan Hurd and Lacy Cavalier (2016)
- Pub Shows (2017)
- Eyes on You Tour (2018)
- Way Down Yonder Tour (2023)

Preceded by Parvati Shallow	Runner-Up of Survivor; Survivor: Nicaragua	Succeeded by Phillip Sheppard
