= Colt Ford discography =

American country rap artist

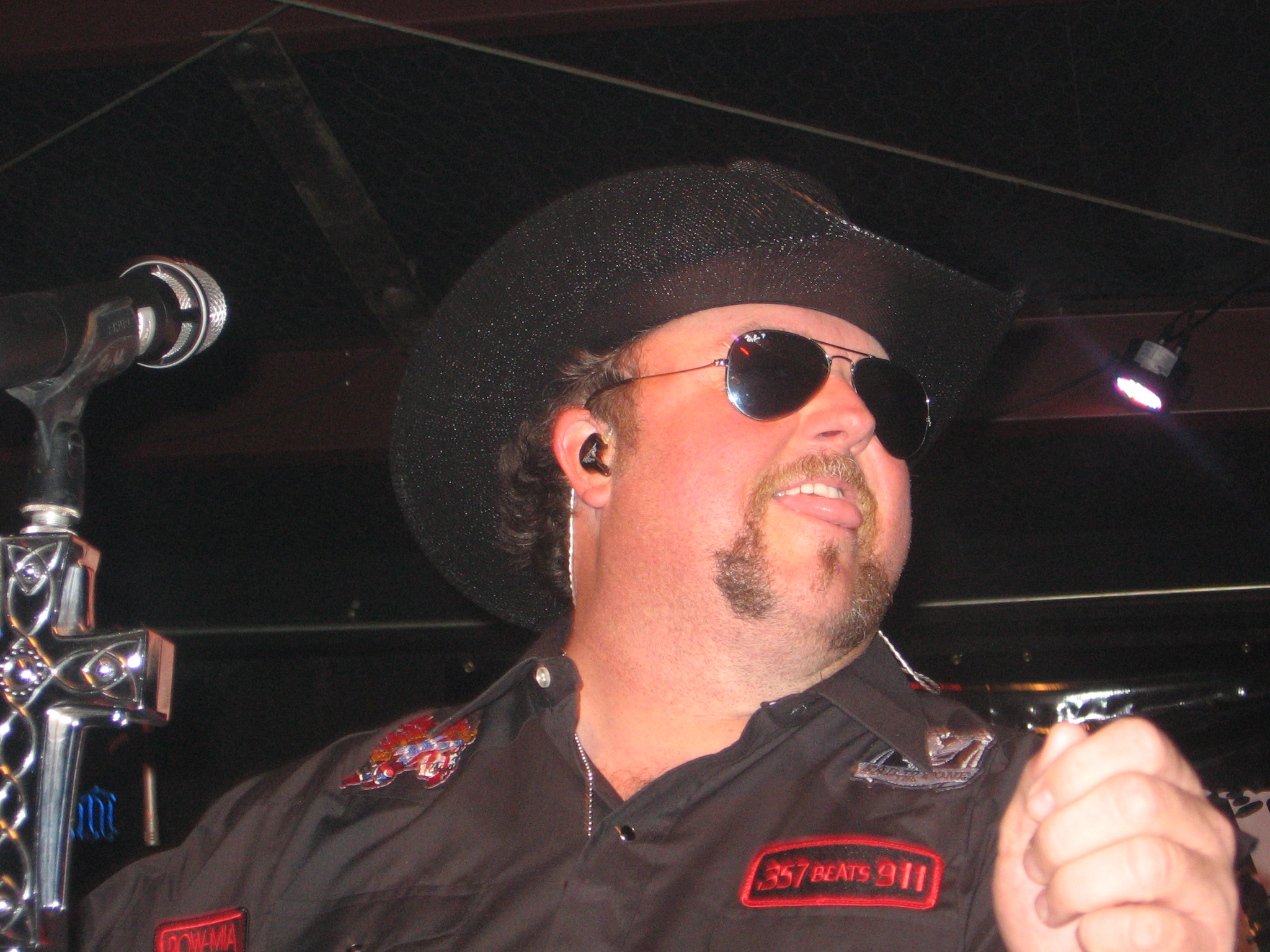
- Studio albums: 7
- EPs: 2
- Live albums: 1
- Compilation albums: 1
- Singles: 12
- Music videos: 10

American country rap artist Colt Ford has released seven studio albums, one compilation album, one live album, and two extended plays. Signed to Average Joes Entertainment, a label which he co-owns, Ford has charted eight times on Hot Country Songs. His most successful chart entry is "The High Life", a duet with Chase Rice that appeared on Ford's fifth studio album, Thanks for Listening.

== Albums ==
=== Studio albums ===
Title	Album details	Peak chart positions					Sales	Certifications
Title	Album details	US Country	US	US Heat	US Indie	US Rap	Sales	Certifications
Ride Through the Country	Release date: December 2, 2008; Label: Average Joes Entertainment; Formats: CD, download	24	97	2	18	12		RIAA: Gold
Chicken & Biscuits	Release date: April 20, 2010; Label: Average Joes Entertainment; Formats: CD, download	8	28	—	4	4	US: 93,000	
Every Chance I Get	Release date: May 3, 2011; Label: Average Joes Entertainment; Formats: CD, download	3	26	—	5	3	US: 73,000	
Declaration of Independence	Release date: August 7, 2012; Label: Average Joes Entertainment; Formats: CD, download	1	5	—	1	2		RIAA: Gold
Thanks for Listening	Release date: July 1, 2014; Label: Average Joes Entertainment; Formats: CD, download	2	10	—	1	1	US: 95,200	
Love Hope Faith	Release date: May 5, 2017; Label: Average Joes Entertainment; Formats: CD, download	7	64	—	5	23	US: 22,600	
We the People, Volume 1	Release date: September 20, 2019; Label: Average Joes Entertainment; Formats: CD, download	42	—	—	9	—	US: 7,200	
Must Be the Country	Release date: May 19, 2023; Label: Average Joes Entertainment; Formats: CD, download	—	—	—	—	—		
"—" denotes releases that did not chart

=== Compilation albums ===
Title	Album details	Peak chart positions			Sales
Title	Album details	US Country	US Indie	US Rap	Sales
Answer to No One: The Colt Ford Classics	Release date: October 23, 2015; Label: Average Joes Entertainment; Formats: CD, download	14	12	15	US: 3,000

=== Live albums ===
Title	Album details	Peak chart positions	
Title	Album details	US Country	US Heat
Live from the Suwannee River Jam	Release date: December 8, 2009; Label: Average Joes Entertainment; Formats: CD, download	45	17

=== Video albums ===
Title	Album details
Crank It Up: Live at Wild Adventures	Release date: November 10, 2014; Label: Eagle Rock Entertainment; Formats: DVD, Blu-ray

== Extended plays ==
Title	EP details	Peak chart positions		
Title	EP details	US Country	US Heat	US Indie
Country Is as Country Does	Release date: October 6, 2009; Label: Average Joes Entertainment; Formats: CD, download	41	14	46
Keys to the Country	Release date: November 6, 2021; Label: Average Joes Entertainment; Formats: CD, download	—	—	—

== Singles ==
Year	Single	Peak chart positions			Certifications	Album
Year	Single	US Country	US Country Airplay	US Bubbling	Certifications	Album
2009	"No Trash in My Trailer" (featuring Joe Diffie; uncredited)	—		—		Ride Through the Country
2009	"Ride Through the Country" (featuring John Michael Montgomery)	57		—	RIAA: Gold	Ride Through the Country
2010	"Cold Beer" (featuring Jamey Johnson)	53		—		Ride Through the Country
2010	"Chicken & Biscuits" (featuring James Otto or Rhean Boyer; uncredited)	60		—		Chicken & Biscuits
2011	"Country Thang" (featuring Eric Church or Dallas Davidson; uncredited)	54		—		Every Chance I Get
2011	"She Likes to Ride in Trucks" (featuring Craig Morgan)	— (Note: "She Likes to Ride In Trucks" did not enter the Country Airplay chart, but peaked at number 50 on the Country Indicator chart.)		—		Every Chance I Get
2012	"Answer to No One" (featuring JJ Lawhorn)	—	—	—	RIAA: Gold	Declaration of Independence
2012	"Back" (with Jake Owen)	40	50	—	RIAA: Gold	Declaration of Independence
2013	"Drivin' Around Song" (featuring Jason Aldean)	41	56	6	RIAA: Platinum	Declaration of Independence
2014	"The High Life" (featuring Chase Rice)	38	—	—		Thanks for Listening
2014	"Workin' On"	—	—	—	RIAA: Platinum	Thanks for Listening
2014	"Crank It Up"	—	— (Note: "Crank It Up" did not enter the Country Airplay chart, but peaked at number 58 on the Country Indicator chart.)	—		Thanks for Listening
2016	"4 Lane Gone"	—	—	—		Love Hope Faith
2017	"Young Americans" (featuring Charles Kelley and Josh Kelley)	—	—	—		Love Hope Faith
2018	"Dynamite" (featuring Waterloo Revival)	—	—	—		Love Hope Faith
2019	"We the People"	—	— (Note: "We the People" did not enter the Country Airplay chart, but peaked at number 57 on the Country Indicator chart.)	—		We the People Volume 1
2019	"Slow Ride" (featuring Mitchell Tenpenny)	—	—	—	RIAA: Gold	We the People Volume 1
"—" denotes releases that did not chart

=== Guest singles ===
Year	Single	Artist	Peak chart positions	Album
Year	Single	Artist	CAN Country	Album
2014	"River Bank (Remix)"	Brad Paisley	—	Moonshine in the Trunk
2014	"Luke Bryan"	Cledus T. Judd	—	—N/a
2015	"Hillbilly Highway"	The Road Hammers	43	Wheels
2016	"Trashy Women (20th Anniversary)"	Confederate Railroad (with John Anderson and Willie Nelson)	—	Lucky to Be Alive
2019	"Born American"	Brodie Stewart	—	Non-album single

== Other charted songs ==
Year	Single	Peak chart positions	Certifications	Album
Year	Single	US Country	Certifications	Album
2008	"Dirt Road Anthem" (featuring Brantley Gilbert)	—	RIAA: Gold	Ride Through the Country
2010	"Mr. Goodtime"	60		Ride Through the Country
2018	"Shoulda Named It After Me" (with Upchurch)	46		Non-album single
2019	"Welcome to Hazeville" (featuring Lukas Nelson and Willie Nelson)	—	RIAA: Gold	Fire & Brimstone

== Music videos ==
Year	Video	Director
2008	"No Trash in My Trailer"	The Brads
2009	"Mr. Goodtime"	Colt Ford
2009	"Buck 'Em"	—N/a
2010	"Chicken & Biscuits"	Potsy Ponciroli
2010	"Hip Hop in a Honky Tonk" (with Kevin Fowler)	Wes Edwards
2011	"Country Thang" (with Dallas Davidson)	Potsy Ponciroli
2011	"Waste Some Time" (with Nappy Roots and Nic Cowan)	David Poag
2011	"What I Call Home" (with JB and the Moonshine Band)	—N/a
2012	"Back"	Potsy Ponciroli
2012	"Answer to No One" (with JJ Lawhorn)	—N/a
2013	"Swingin'" (with John Anderson)	Potsy Ponciroli
2013	"Two Step" (with Laura Bell Bundy)	Laura Bell Bundy/Becky Fluke
2013	"Drivin' Around Song" (with Jason Aldean)	Potsy Ponciroli
2014	"The High Life" (with Chase Rice)	Scott Hansen
2014	"We All Country" (with Sarah Ross, Demun Jones & Moonshine Bandits)	—N/a
2015	"Hillbilly Highway" (with The Road Hammers)	—N/a
2015	"Workin' On"	—N/a
2015	"Dirty Side" (with Walker Hayes)	—N/a
2015	"Cut 'Em All" (with Willie Robertson)	David Poag
2016	"Truck Step"	Ry & Drew Cox
2016	"4 Lane Gone"	Ed Pryor
2017	"Reload" (with Taylor Ray Holbrook)	—N/a
2017	"Times We Had" (with Taylor Ray Holbrook and Charlie Farley)	Brandon Luce
2017	"Young Americans" (with Josh Kelley & Charles Kelley)	—N/a
2017	"Dynamite" (with Waterloo Revival)	
2018	"My Truck" (feat. Tyler Farr)	
2018	"Time Flies" (with Toby Keith)	Eric Welch
2018	"No Rest" (feat. Javier Colon)	
2019	"We the People"	—N/a
2019	"Slow Ride" (with Mitchell Tenpenny)	—N/a
2020	"Back to Them Backroads" (with Jimmie Allen)	Potsy Ponciroli
