= Answer to No One: The Colt Ford Classics =

Compilation album by Colt Ford
- Released: October 23, 2015
- Genre: Country rap
- Label: Average Joe's Entertainment
- Producer: Various

Colt Ford chronology
Thanks for Listening (2014)	Answer to No One: The Colt Ford Classics (2015)

Answer to No One: The Colt Ford Classics is the first compilation album of country rap American musician Colt Ford. It was released on October 23, 2015. Features four songs from his first album Ride Through the Country, three songs from his latest album Thanks for Listening, three from Declaration of Independence and two from Every Chance I Get, as well as the title-track of Chicken & Biscuits and the song "Huntin' the World", featured in the album Mud Digger, of the eponymous artist.

== Track listing ==
No.	Title	Writer(s)	Original album	Length
1.	"Answer to No One"	Colt Ford, Noah Gordon, Mike Hartnett, Shannon Houchins	Declaration of Independence	3:32
2.	"The High Life"	Ford, Chase Rice, Jesse Rice, Zach Crowell, Chris Cline	Thanks for Listening	4:05
3.	"Crank It Up"	Kevin Kadish, Rich Redmond, Jacob Scherer	Thanks for Listening	3:20
4.	"Back"	Ford, Gordon, Hartnett, Houchins	Declaration of Independence	4:02
5.	"Huntin' the World"	Ford, Justin Spillner	Country Is as Country Does	2:52
6.	"Waste Some Time"	Ford, Houchins, Jared Scuillo, Spillner	Every Chance I Get	4:55
7.	"Cut 'Em All"	Ford, Scuillo, Spillner	Thanks for Listening	2:40
8.	"Country Thang"	Rhett Akins, Dallas Davidson, Ford, Ben Hayslip	Every Chance I Get	2:52
9.	"Drivin' Around Song"	Chris Tompkins, Craig Wiseman	Declaration of Independence	3:40
10.	"Cold Beer"	Ford, Houchins, Scuillo, Spillner	Ride Through the Country	3:42
11.	"Ride Through the Country"	Ford, Houchins, Demun Jones, Scuillo, Spillner	Ride Through the Country	4:34
12.	"Chicken & Biscuits"	Akins, Ford, Haylip	Chicken & Biscuits	3:06
13.	"No Trash in My Trailer"	Mike Dekle, Ford, Byron Hill	Ride Through the Country	3:25
14.	"Dirt Road Anthem"	Ford, Brantley Gilbert	Ride Through the Country	3:44

== Chart performance ==
Chart (2015)	Peak position
US Top Country Albums (Billboard)	14
US Independent Albums (Billboard)	12
US Top Rap Albums (Billboard)	15
