= WTP =

WTP may refer to:

== Arts and entertainment ==
- "WTP", a song from the album K.T.S.E. by American artist Teyana Taylor
- "W.T.P." ("White Trash Party"), a song by rapper Eminem; See the album Recovery
- Winnie-the-Pooh, a fictionalized bear in books by A. A. Milne

== Philosophy ==
- Will to power, a prominent concept in the philosophy of Friedrich Nietzsche.

== Science and technology ==
- Water treatment plant, a facility that performs water purification
- Web Tools Platform, a platform for the Eclipse software
- Western Treatment Plant, a sewage treatment plant in Australia
- Wireless transaction protocol, technical term in wireless communication

== Other uses ==
- Besix Watpac, an Australian construction company ASX ticker code
- Willingness to pay, economic term used in pricing theory
- Women's Torah Project, transcription of the Torah entirely by women
- Warszawski Transport Publiczny, Warsaw's Public Transport Authority
- "We the People" is the opening phrase of the Preamble to the United States Constitution
