= Taylor Ray Holbrook =

American country music singer and songwriter

- Born: Pennington Gap, Virginia, U.S.
- Genre: Country
- Occupations: Singer, songwriter
- Instrument: Vocals
- Years active: 2017–present
- Label: TaylorRayMade

Taylor Ray Holbrook is an American country music singer and songwriter. He has released multiple singles independently through his TaylorRayMade label, including "Southern Land", a duet with Upchurch.

== Biography ==
Holbrook was born and raised in Pennington Gap, Virginia. He worked as a lumberjack before gaining an interest in music. This included posting videos of his songs to social media such as Twitter and Facebook. In 2015, his single "Steal My Kiss" appeared on the Billboard Hot Country Songs charts, which inspired Holbrook to move to Nashville, Tennessee. He continued to record throughout 2016 and 2017, including a collaboration with Upchurch titled "Southern Land".

Both the Upchurch collaboration and a 2016 single titled "These Hands" also made the Billboard country charts. Country rap artist Colt Ford also featured Holbrook on the track "Reload" from his 2017 album Love Hope Faith.

Rachel Whitney, a representative of country music programming for Pandora, observed that the service added his music to their platform after noting a large number of searches for his name. She cited this as an example of the service's ability to draw awareness to independent artists.

== Singles ==
Year	Single	Peak position	Certifications
Year	Single	US Country	Certifications
2015	"Steal My Kiss"	45	
2016	"Southern Land" (with Upchurch)	44	RIAA: Gold
2017	"These Hands"	48	
