= Every Chance I Get =

Every Chance I Get may refer to:

- Every Chance I Get (album), a 2011 album by Colt Ford
- Every Chance I Get (song), a 2021 song by DJ Khaled
- Every Chance I Get, a song by T.I., from the album Paper Trail
