= Hum Log =

Hum Log (lit. 'We the People' in Hindi) may refer to:

- Hum Log (film), a 1951 Bollywood film
- Hum Log (TV series), a 1984 Indian soap opera

== See also ==
- We the People (disambiguation)
