= Country Is as Country Does =

EP by Colt Ford
- Released: June 10, 2009
- Genre: Country rap
- Label: Average Joe's Entertainment

Colt Ford chronology
Ride Through the Country (2008)	Country Is as Country Does (2009)	Live from the Suwannee River Jam (2009)

Country Is as Country Does is an extended play of the American country rap musician Colt Ford. It was released on October 6, 2009. The tracks weren't revived in any of his subsequent albums, with the exception of "Huntin' the World", released on the first compilation album Answer to No One: The Colt Ford Classics (2015). The last track, "Dirt Road Anthem", was present in the previous album Ride Through the Country (2008). The first track, "Buck'Em", is the only one to have a music video.

== Track listing ==
The following information was taken from the AllMusic website.

No.	Title	Writer(s)	Length
1.	"Buck'Em"	Colt Ford, Shannon Houchins	3:06
2.	"Huntin' the World"	Ford, Jared Sciullo, Justin Spillner	2:53
3.	"Big White Redneck"	Ford, Monte Holmes, Greg Perkins	3:06
4.	"Day in the Life"	Jamey Johnson, Jeremy Popoff	3:37
5.	"Left Y'all in the Dust"	Ford, Sciullo, Spillner	3:13
6.	"Dirt Road Anthem" (live)	Ford, Brantley Gilbert	6:43

== Chart performance ==
Chart (2009)	Peak position
US Top Country Albums (Billboard)	41
US Heatseekers Albums (Billboard)	14
US Independent Albums (Billboard)	46
