= Mark Kaylor =

English boxer (1961–2025)

Personal information
- Nationality: British
- Born: 11 May 1961 Canning Town, London, England
- Died: 15 November 2025 (aged 64)
- Height: 6 ft 1/2 in (184 cm)
- Weight: Middleweight

Boxing career
- Stance: Orthodox

Boxing record
- Total fights: 48
- Wins: 40
- Win by KO: 34
- Losses: 7
- Draws: 1
- No contests: 0

Mark Kaylor (11 May 1961 – 15 November 2025) was a British professional boxer.

== Biography ==
Kaylor was born in Canning Town, London, but from the age of nine was brought up in Stanford-le-Hope, Essex. Kaylor won the British schoolboy title the first year he was eligible to take part and at the age of 16, moved back to Canning Town to live with his grandmother so that he could join a bigger boxing club at West Ham. In 1979, at the age of 17, Kaylor won the National Association of Boys Clubs Championships and the London senior title. In 1980, Kaylor won the British Amateur Boxing Association Championships and went to the European Junior championships in Rimini, Italy. Kaylor represented Great Britain in the 1980 Moscow Olympics, losing on a split decision in the quarter-finals.

Perhaps his most famous fight came in 1985, when he defeated Errol Christie in the eighth round of a hard-fought match, marred with controversy due to a pre-fight punch-up between the pair, and by death threats from racist fans against Christie. Despite the controversy, Kaylor and Christie in fact showed great respect for each other after the match. Kaylor later commented, "Back then, I had a quick temper that I’d rather not have had. There was always this spark in my head! Today, I’m embarrassed by it. Errol was a nice guy. There’s no way I could behave like that now."

He appeared in Ron Peck's 1991 film Fighters, which follows a group of young East End boxers as they try to make it to the top in the boxing game. The Daily Telegraph obituary noted that he came across in the film as a softly-spoken and thoughtful individual who said he hated violence.

Kaylor worked with Peck again in 1996, this time in a semi-improvised, fictional film Real Money, about a group of young boxers getting drawn into underworld villainy and crime. Real Money also starred other well known and well respected faces from the boxing world, such as father and son Jimmy Tibbs and Mark Tibbs, Steve Roberts and Jason Rowland, boxer, writer and actor Jimmy Flint who had also starred in many of Ron Peck's films, and later went on to star in many other films such as Lock Stock and Two Smoking Barrels, Revolver and Rise of the Footsoldier.

In 1996, Kaylor moved to California with his family. He was also very close to his nephew Charles Kaylor. He coached boxing and was an aerobics instructor at a gym.

Kaylor died on 15 November 2025, at the age of 64.

== Professional boxing record ==
40 Wins (34 knockouts, 6 decisions), 7 Losses (4 knockouts, 3 decisions), 1 Draw Mark Kaylor - Boxer Archived 31 March 2013 at the Wayback Machine
Result	Record	Opponent	Type	Round	Date	Location	Notes
Loss	16-8	(United Kingdom) James Cook	TKO	6	1 June 1991	York Hall, London, England	EBU Super Middleweight Title. Referee stopped the bout at 2:40 of the sixth round.
Win	12-0	(Sweden) Roland Ericsson	TKO	4	20 March 1991	Battersea Town Hall, London, England	
Win	12-2-1	(United States) Shannon Landberg	TKO	6	7 March 1991	(United Kingdom) Basildon Festival Hall, Basildon, England	
Loss	14-1-2	(Italy) Mauro Galvano	UD	12	31 March 1990	Capo d'Orlando, Italy	EBU Super Middleweight Title.
Draw	5-7-1	(Nigeria) Jerry Okorodudu	MD	10	26 June 1989	Marriott Hotel, Irvine, California, US	
Loss	22-14-1	(United States) Tom Collins	KO	9	11 May 1988	Grand Hall, London, England	EBU Light Heavyweight Title.
Win	3-10	(United States) Roy Safford	KO	2	29 March 1988	Wembley Arena, London, England	
Win	18-7	(United States) Charles Henderson	TKO	3	3 February 1988	Grand Hall, London, England	
Win	13-5-1	(United States) Jamie Howe	TKO	4	24 October 1987	White Hart Lane, London, England	
Win	5-2	(United States) Jack Basting	KO	6	27 June 1987	Palais des Festivals, Cannes, France	
Win	16-2-1	(United Kingdom) Tommy Taylor	TKO	4	18 April 1987	Royal Albert Hall, London, England	Referee stopped the bout at 2:12 of the fourth round.
Win	14-13	(United States) Jimmy Shavers	PTS	8	22 February 1987	Grand Hall, London, England	
Loss	36-0	(United Kingdom) Herol Graham	TKO	8	4 November 1986	Wembley Arena, London, England	EBU Middleweight Title.
Win	18-8-1	(United States) Tony Harrison	TKO	9	17 September 1986	Royal Albert Hall, London, England	
Win	18-6-4	(United States) Tony Cerda	TKO	6	19 July 1986	Wembley Stadium, London, England	
Win	20-1	(United Kingdom) Errol Christie	KO	8	5 November 1985	London, England	Christie knocked out at 2:35 of the eighth round.
Win	21-4-1	(United States) Dwight Walker	PTS	10	16 June 1985	York Hall, London, England	
Win	13-4	(United States) Richard Beranek	KO	3	14 April 1985	York Hall, London, England	Beranek knocked out at 1:25 of the third round.
Loss	50-5-1	(United Kingdom) Tony Sibson	UD	12	27 November 1984	Wembley Arena, London, England	Commonwealth/BBBofC British/EBU Middleweight Titles.
Win	8-3	(United States) David Todt	TKO	6	16 October 1984	Royal Albert Hall, London, England	
Loss	18-8-1	(United States) Buster Drayton	TKO	7	13 May 1984	Empire Pool, London, England	
Win	14-1	(United States) Randy Smith	PTS	10	13 March 1984	Empire Pool, London, England	
Win	20-8	(United States) Ralph Moncrief	TKO	5	31 January 1984	Royal Albert Hall, London, England	
Loss	14-3-4	(United States) Tony Cerda	DQ	9	22 November 1983	Wembley Arena, London, England	
Win	26-8-3	(Saint Christopher-Nevis-Anguilla) Roy Gumbs	KO	5	14 September 1983	Alexandra Pavilion, London, England	BBBofC British/Commonwealth Middleweight Titles. Gumbs knocked out at 2:00 of the fifth round.
Win	10-2	(United States) Bobby West	TKO	5	31 May 1983	Royal Albert Hall, London, England	Referee stopped the bout at 2:03 of the fifth round.
Win	38-6-1	(United States) Bobby Watts	TKO	4	3 May 1983	Wembley Arena, London, England	Referee stopped the bout at 0:57 of the fourth round.
Win	15-9-1	(United Kingdom) Glen McEwan	TKO	2	1 March 1983	Royal Albert Hall, London, England	Referee stopped the bout at 1:51 of the second round.
Win	19-19-2	(United States) Henry Walker	PTS	10	18 January 1983	Royal Albert Hall, London, England	
Win	5-6-2	(Spain) Juan Muñoz Holgado	KO	2	7 December 1982	Royal Albert Hall, London, England	Holgado knocked out at 0:48 of the second round.
Win	25-10-1	(United Kingdom) Eddie Smith	TKO	3	9 November 1982	Royal Albert Hall, London, England	Referee stopped the bout at 1:40 of the third round.
Win	10-3-1	(Wales) Doug James	TKO	2	26 October 1982	York Hall, London, England	
Win	23-9-1	(Belgium) Maurice Bufi	TKO	3	22 September 1982	Mayfair Sporting Club, London, England	
Win	6-4	(United States) Steve Williams	TKO	2	1 June 1982	Royal Albert Hall, London, England	
Win	32-14-1	(France) Joel Bonnetaz	TKO	3	20 April 1982	Royal Albert Hall, London, England	
Win	13-1	(Spain) Alfonso Redondo	TKO	5	17 March 1982	Royal Albert Hall, London, England	Referee stopped the bout at 2:25 of the fifth round.
Win	7-7	(Dominican Republic) Dario De Asa	TKO	3	2 March 1982	Royal Albert Hall, London, England	Referee stopped the bout at 2:15 of the third round.
Win	12-11	(United Kingdom) Romal Ambrose	KO	1	9 February 1982	Royal Albert Hall, London, England	Ambrose knocked out at 2:30 of the first round.
Win	2-6	(Nigeria) Billy Savage	TKO	2	24 November 1981	Wembley Arena, London, England	Referee stopped the bout at 2:07 of the second round.
Win	6-8-2	(Wales) Winston Burnett	TKO	6	3 November 1981	Royal Albert Hall, London, England	Referee stopped the bout at 2:20 of the sixth round.
Win	8-2	(United States) George Danahar	TKO	3	20 October 1981	York Hall, London, England	Referee stopped the bout at 2:28 of the third round.
Win	13-7-2	(United Kingdom) Jimmy Everard Ellis	TKO	5	15 September 1981	Wembley Arena, London, England	Referee stopped the bout at 0:44 of the fifth round.
Win	13-18-3	(United Kingdom) Joe Gregory	TKO	6	26 May 1981	York Hall, London, England	
Win	9-7-1	(United Kingdom) Peter Bassey	PTS	8	17 March 1981	Wembley Arena, London, England	
Win	12-5	(United Kingdom) Martin McEwan	TKO	6	24 February 1981	Royal Albert Hall, London, England	Referee stopped the bout at 1:20 of the sixth round.
Win	3-3-1	(Wales) Winston Burnett	PTS	8	27 January 1981	Royal Albert Hall, London, England	
Win	9-17-2	(United Kingdom) Clifton Wallace	TKO	3	8 December 1980	Royal Albert Hall, London, England	Referee stopped the bout at 1:40 of the third round.
Win	9-9-3	(United Kingdom) Peter Morris	TKO	5	14 October 1980	Royal Albert Hall, London, England	Referee stopped the bout at 2:40 of the fifth round.

’
