= Pennington Gap, Virginia =

- Town
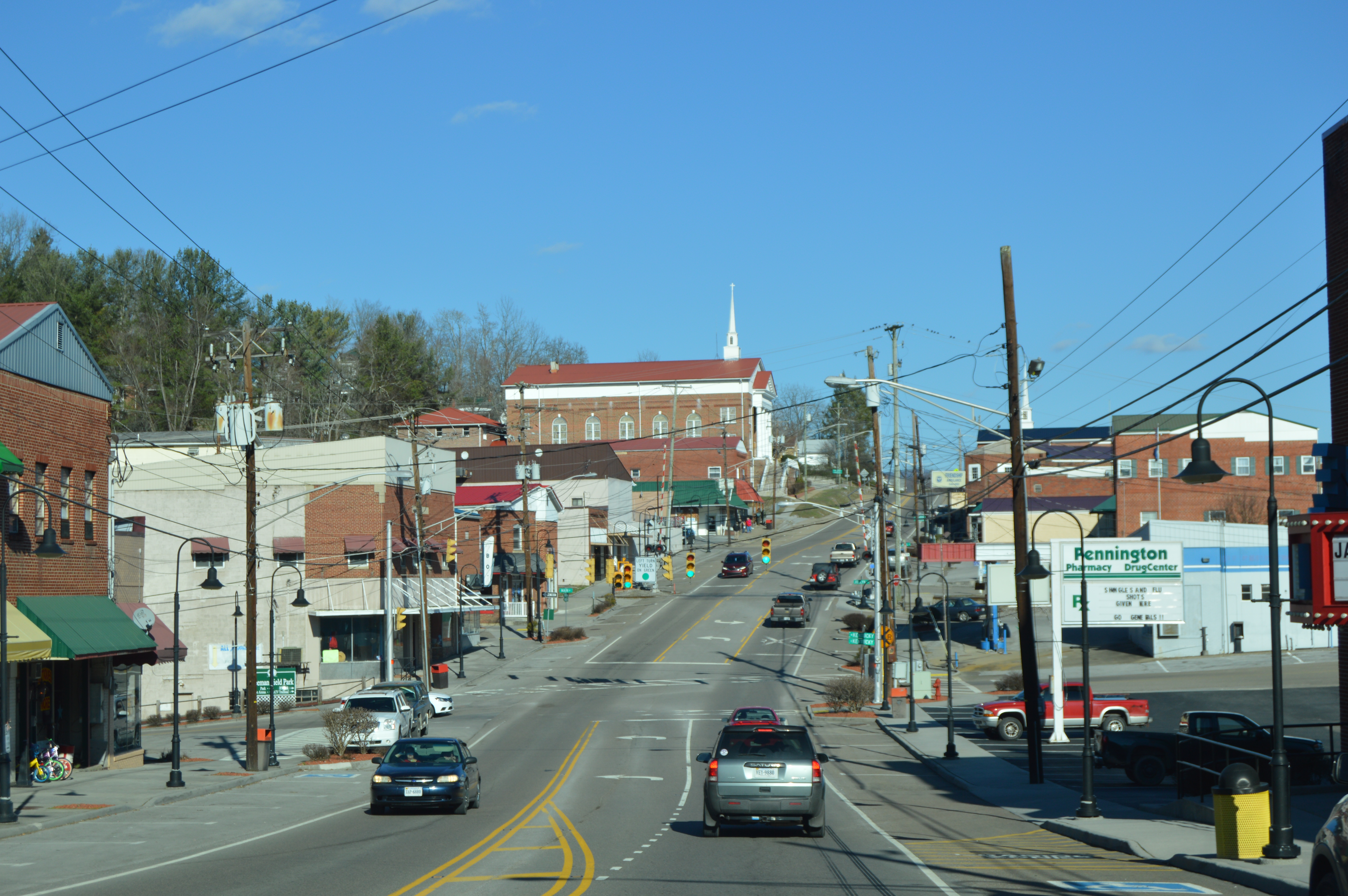
- Morgan Street downtown (2017)

- Seal

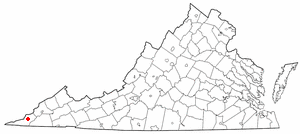
- Location of Pennington Gap, Virginia

- Location in the United States
- Coordinates: 36°45′24″N 83°1′46″W
- Country: United States
- State: Virginia
- County: Lee

Area
  - Total: 1.69 sq mi (4.37 km^{2})
  - Land: 1.67 sq mi (4.32 km^{2})
  - Water: 0.019 sq mi (0.05 km^{2})
- Elevation: 1,388 ft (423 m)

Population (2020)
  - Total: 1,624
  - Density: 974/sq mi (376/km^{2})
- Time zone: UTC−5 (Eastern (EST))
  - Summer (DST): UTC−4 (EDT)
- ZIP Code: 24277
- Area code: 276
- FIPS code: 51-61560
- GNIS feature ID: 1486137
- Website: townofpenningtonva.gov

Pennington Gap is a town in Lee County, Virginia, United States. The population was 1,624 at the 2020 census.

== History ==
The Pennington Gap post office was established in 1891.

The Lee Regional Medical Center in Pennington Gap closed in 2013, but reopened as Lee County Community Hospital in 2021.

== Geography ==
Pennington Gap is located at 36°45′24″N 83°1′46″W (36.756580, −83.029375).

According to the United States Census Bureau, the town has an area of 1.5 square miles (3.9 km^{2}), all land.

Pennington Gap is at the junction of U.S. Route 58A and U.S. Route 421.

=== Climate ===
The climate is characterized by hot, humid summers and generally mild to cool winters. According to the Köppen Climate Classification system, Pennington Gap has a humid subtropical climate, abbreviated "Cfa" on climate maps.

Climate data for Pennington Gap, Virginia (1991–2020 normals, extremes 1931–present)
Month	Jan	Feb	Mar	Apr	May	Jun	Jul	Aug	Sep	Oct	Nov	Dec	Year
Record high °F (°C)	76 (24)	80 (27)	90 (32)	89 (32)	94 (34)	100 (38)	105 (41)	101 (38)	101 (38)	94 (34)	85 (29)	78 (26)	105 (41)
Mean daily maximum °F (°C)	44.8 (7.1)	49.3 (9.6)	58.7 (14.8)	68.7 (20.4)	76.1 (24.5)	82.8 (28.2)	85.3 (29.6)	84.9 (29.4)	80.7 (27.1)	70.5 (21.4)	58.2 (14.6)	48.4 (9.1)	67.4 (19.7)
Daily mean °F (°C)	34.0 (1.1)	37.5 (3.1)	45.2 (7.3)	54.1 (12.3)	63.0 (17.2)	70.7 (21.5)	74.1 (23.4)	73.2 (22.9)	67.7 (19.8)	56.1 (13.4)	44.9 (7.2)	37.3 (2.9)	54.8 (12.7)
Mean daily minimum °F (°C)	23.2 (−4.9)	25.7 (−3.5)	31.7 (−0.2)	39.6 (4.2)	49.9 (9.9)	58.7 (14.8)	62.8 (17.1)	61.6 (16.4)	54.6 (12.6)	41.7 (5.4)	31.5 (−0.3)	26.3 (−3.2)	42.3 (5.7)
Record low °F (°C)	−25 (−32)	−21 (−29)	−8 (−22)	16 (−9)	24 (−4)	32 (0)	41 (5)	36 (2)	28 (−2)	16 (−9)	3 (−16)	−16 (−27)	−25 (−32)
Average precipitation inches (mm)	4.41 (112)	4.37 (111)	4.86 (123)	4.59 (117)	4.32 (110)	4.39 (112)	4.44 (113)	3.95 (100)	3.71 (94)	2.99 (76)	2.88 (73)	4.77 (121)	49.68 (1,262)
Average snowfall inches (cm)	3.5 (8.9)	2.8 (7.1)	1.1 (2.8)	0.1 (0.25)	0.0 (0.0)	0.0 (0.0)	0.0 (0.0)	0.0 (0.0)	0.0 (0.0)	0.0 (0.0)	0.0 (0.0)	1.8 (4.6)	9.3 (24)
Average precipitation days (≥ 0.01 in)	10.9	10.1	11.8	10.8	12.1	12.2	12.9	10.5	7.9	7.9	8.5	10.8	126.4
Average snowy days (≥ 0.1 in)	1.8	1.6	0.7	0.2	0.0	0.0	0.0	0.0	0.0	0.0	0.0	0.8	5.1
Source: NOAA

== Demographics ==
Historical population
Census	Pop.	Note	%±
1900	399		—
1910	792		98.5%
1920	940		18.7%
1930	1,553		65.2%
1940	1,990		28.1%
1950	2,090		5.0%
1960	1,799		−13.9%
1970	1,886		4.8%
1980	1,716		−9.0%
1990	1,922		12.0%
2000	1,781		−7.3%
2010	1,781		0.0%
2020	1,624		−8.8%
2025 (est.)	1,568	▼	−3.4%
U.S. Decennial Census

=== 2020 census ===
As of the 2020 census, Pennington Gap had a population of 1,624. The median age was 45.8 years. 20.1% of residents were under the age of 18 and 24.9% of residents were 65 years of age or older. For every 100 females there were 87.1 males, and for every 100 females age 18 and over there were 81.8 males age 18 and over.

0.0% of residents lived in urban areas, while 100.0% lived in rural areas.

There were 714 households in Pennington Gap, of which 27.0% had children under the age of 18 living in them. Of all households, 28.6% were married-couple households, 25.8% were households with a male householder and no spouse or partner present, and 38.8% were households with a female householder and no spouse or partner present. About 41.6% of all households were made up of individuals and 15.8% had someone living alone who was 65 years of age or older.

There were 866 housing units, of which 17.6% were vacant. The homeowner vacancy rate was 3.0% and the rental vacancy rate was 10.5%.

Racial composition as of the 2020 census
Race	Number	Percent
White	1,521	93.7%
Black or African American	37	2.3%
American Indian and Alaska Native	5	0.3%
Asian	13	0.8%
Native Hawaiian and Other Pacific Islander	0	0.0%
Some other race	5	0.3%
Two or more races	43	2.6%
Hispanic or Latino (of any race)	11	0.7%

=== 2000 census ===
At the 2000 census there were 1,781 people, 811 households, and 480 families living in the town. The population density was 1,174.0 people per square mile (452.4/km^{2}). There were 950 housing units at an average density of 626.2 per square mile (241.3/km^{2}). The racial makeup of the town was 95.28% White, 3.43% African American, 0.39% Native American, 0.28% Asian, and 0.62% from two or more races. Hispanic or Latino of any race were 0.67%.

Of the 811 households 22.9% had children under the age of 18 living with them, 40.4% were married couples living together, 16.2% had a female householder with no husband present, and 40.8% were non-families. 37.5% of households were one person and 16.8% were one person aged 65 or older. The average household size was 2.15 and the average family size was 2.84.

The age distribution was 20.5% under the age of 18, 7.2% from 18 to 24, 25.4% from 25 to 44, 25.3% from 45 to 64, and 21.6% 65 or older. The median age was 42 years. For every 100 females, there were 81.4 males. For every 100 females aged 18 and over, there were 74.6 males.

The median household income was $18,056 and the median family income was $27,875. Males had a median income of $27,885 versus $18,625 for females. The per capita income for the town was $13,742. About 28.3% of families and 31.3% of the population were below the poverty line, including 42.0% of those under age 18 and 24.7% of those age 65 or over.

== Government ==
The Federal Bureau of Prisons United States Penitentiary, Lee is in the Lee County Industrial Park in unincorporated Lee County, near Pennington Gap.

== Education ==
Lee County Public Schools operates the county's schools.

Pennington Elementary School was on Morgan Avenue, consisting of three buildings built in 1912, 1917, and 1937.

In 1989, with the consolidation of many of the county's high schools at the newly constructed Lee High School, the old Pennington High School was converted into Pennington Middle School (grades 6–7 as of 2026-2027).

== Notable people ==
- Barry Audia, pro boxer
- Claude Ely, preacher and songwriter
- Taylor Ray Holbrook, singer
- Cynthia D. Kinser, chief justice of the Supreme Court of Virginia
- Jim Pankovits, pro baseball player
- William C. Wampler, U.S. representative
- Carol S. Wood, mathematician
