= We the People (disambiguation) =

"We the People" is the opening phrase of the Preamble to the United States Constitution and the Preamble to the Constitution of India.

We the People may also refer to:

== Politics and government ==
- We the People (petitioning system), a defunct online petitioning mechanism sponsored by the US federal government
- We the People: The Citizen and the Constitution, an activity sponsored by the Center for Civic Education
- We the People Act, a bill proposed in the US House of Representatives
- We the People Foundation, a tax-protest organization
- We the People Party, a political party in the United States created by the Robert F. Kennedy Jr. 2024 presidential campaign
- We the People Reform Movement, a political initiative in Belize
- "We the Peoples", the opening expression of the Preamble to the United Nations Charter

== Film and television ==
- We the People (2021 TV series), a Netflix animated musical series produced by Barack and Michelle Obama
- We the People (American TV series), a CBS Television program from 1948 to 1952
- We the People (court show), a courtroom series hosted by Gloria Allred in its first incarnation and Lauren Lake in the ongoing second incarnation
- We the People (Indian TV series), an Indian discussion programme
- We the People, a 1994 film directed by Brent Huff
- Swades: We, the People, a 2004 Indian film by Ashutosh Gowariker

== Books ==
- We the People, a children's book about the writing of the United States Constitution by Lynne Cheney
- We, the People the Drama of America, a 1932 Marxist history of the US by Leo Huberman
- We the People: A History of the U.S. Constitution, a 2025 book about the United States Constitution by Jill Lepore

== Music ==
=== Groups ===
- We the People (band), an Orlando, Florida-based garage rock band from the 1960s

=== Albums ===
- We the People (Adrenaline Mob album), 2017
- We the People (Ellen McIlwaine album), 1973
- We the People (Flipsyde album), 2005
- We the People (Guitar Shorty album), 2006
- We the People (The Soul Searchers album), 1972
- We the People, Volume 1 by Colt Ford, 2019
- We the People by Ray Stevens, 2010

=== Songs ===
- "We the People", anthem of WorldPride 2023 by Electric Fields
- "We the People...." (song), by A Tribe Called Quest, 2016
- "We the People", by Mudvayne from the 2008 album The New Game
- "We the People", by Megadeth from the 2011 album TH1RT3EN
- "We the People", by Billy Ray Cyrus from the 2000 album Southern Rain
- "We the People", by Colt Ford from the 2019 album We the People, Volume 1
- "We the People", by Kid Rock from the 2022 album Bad Reputation

== Other uses ==
- We the People, a 2007 play by Eric Schlosser about the writing of the US Constitution
- We the People (boardgame), a 1993 board wargame about the American Revolution
- a slogan used Wrestler Jake Hager during his wrestling career in WWE

== See also ==
- Hum Log (disambiguation) (lit. 'We the People' in Hindi)
- We the Peoples, the opening words of the Preamble to the United Nations Charter
- We the Peoples Global Leadership Awards, annual awards given by the United Nations Foundation, also known as We the Peoples awards
