= Barry Audia =

American boxer (born 1957)

Barry Alan Audia (born August 1, 1957) is an American former professional boxer who competed from 1980 to 1987. He began his boxing career in the early 1970s and turned professional in 1980. His ranking as a boxer peaked in the mid-1980s at number 7 middleweight in the world.

== Boxing career ==
A native of Pennington Gap, Virginia, Audia had about 100 fights as an amateur. He turned pro in 1980. Audia fought notable boxers such as Errol Christie, Giovanni Bovenzi, and Thomas Hearns as an amateur.

On May 24, 1984, he defeated an undefeated Thomas Smith in the main event of a nationally televised card on ESPN to improve to a 21–0 record. He suffered his first defeat in his following fight against Giovanni Bovenzi in July.

== Life after boxing ==
After his last successful fight against Gary Thomas in Bristol, Tennessee, Audia officially resigned as a professional boxer. He now runs and operates Audia’s Boxing Gym in Pennington Gap, VA.

In 1989, he met his present wife Paula. The couple married in 1991. They had a son, Barry Alan Audia II.

In 2023, he coached the Lee High school golf team to claim their second VHSL state championship.
