= Errol Christie =

British boxer and boxing trainer (1963–2017)

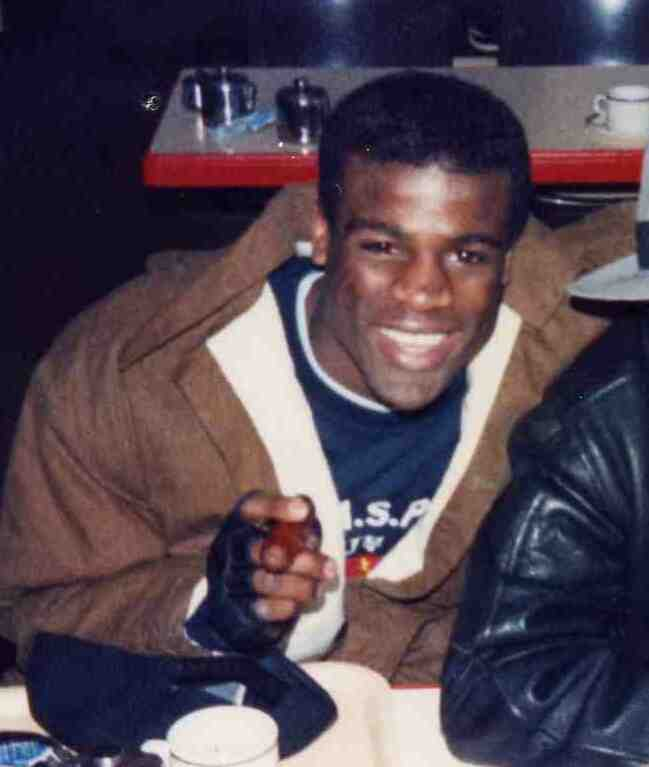

Personal information
- Nickname: Thames Barrier Warrior
- Nationality: British
- Born: 29 June 1963 Leicester, England
- Died: 11 June 2017 (aged 53) London, England
- Height: 5 ft 10 in (178 cm)
- Weight: Middleweight; Super-middleweight

Boxing career
- Stance: Orthodox

Boxing record
- Total fights: 41
- Wins: 32
- Win by KO: 26
- Losses: 8
- Draws: 1
Medal record
Men's amateur boxing
Representing England
English National Championships
Gold medal – first place	1981 London	Light-middleweight
European Junior Championships
Gold medal – first place	1982 Schwerin	Middleweight

Errol Christie (29 June 1963 – 11 June 2017) was a British professional boxer and boxing trainer. He was the captain of the English amateur boxing team from 1980 to 1983 and European amateur champion in 1983. After turning professional he was a regular fixture on ITV Fight Night in the 1980s. After retiring from boxing he became a trainer in white-collar boxing.

== Career ==
=== Boxing career ===
Christie was born in Leicester and raised in Radford, Coventry, one of seven brothers. At the age of eight, he started boxing at the Standard-Triumph gym in Coventry managed by Tom McGarry. Out of 80 fights in his early career, Christie lost only two and gained a reputation for early knockouts. He was Warwickshire champion in 1976, schoolboy champion in 1977, NABC champion in 1979 and senior ABA champion in 1981, beating Cameron Lithgow in the final. He was appointed England boxing captain from 1980 to 1983. He moved to London in 1981 to further his boxing career.

In 1982, he became European amateur under-19 champion after defeating Assylbek Kilimov in the semi-finals and Moe Gruciano in the finals at Schwerin in what was then East Germany. Christie was listed in The Guinness Book of Records as the only British boxer to win all 10 amateur titles.

After turning professional in 1982 with new manager Burt McCarthy he won his first 13 fights, 12 inside the distance, including a victory over French champion Joel Bonnetaz in February 1984. He earned the right to wear the Kronk Gym golden shorts after impressing its promoter Emanuel Steward while sparring there. In September 1984 Jose Seys delivered a surprise knockout which shook Christie's confidence. Seven more wins followed, including a win over former Mexican champion Gonzalo Montes, before a bout with Mark Kaylor in a British middleweight title eliminator at Wembley Arena in November 1985 in which he was knocked out in the eighth round.

After winning his next four fights, beating Nigerian champion Hunter Clay and former welterweight world title challenger Sean Mannion, he suffered another setback when he was stopped by Charles Boston in December 1986. He won eight of his thirteen fights between June 1987 and October 1990, and in November 1990 faced Michael Watson at the National Exhibition Centre; Watson stopped him in the third round. Christie was out of the ring for over two years, returning in March 1993 to face Trevor Ambrose, losing after being stopped in the second round of what proved to be his final fight.

Christie with veteran boxer Henry Cooper (sitting on Christie's left-hand side).

=== Post-boxing career ===
Christie had tried his hand at stand up comedy towards the end of his boxing career and after retiring from boxing in 1993 he worked as a market trader for six years.

In 1999, Christie began teaching white-collar boxers, initially at the Real Fight Club, and from 2003 at Gymbox in Holborn, London. In 2005, The Guardian and other newspapers reported an incident where one of Errol's white collar-boxing students, film distributor Simon Franks, hit Hollywood actor George Clooney at the premiere of his film Good Night, and Good Luck. An argument between the two men was alleged to have got out of control. Christie was quoted in The Guardian asking whether his student, Franks, had used his left hook. His students have included TV presenter Dermot O'Leary, former footballer Gianluca Vialli, musician Seal, and journalist Tony McMahon. He also worked with children in schools and community centres.

In 2010, Christie was taken on as the fight consultant to the play Sucker Punch written by Roy Williams and directed by Sacha Wares, performed at the Royal Court Theatre in Chelsea, London. In March 2010, Christie published his biography No Place To Hide, about racism in both the boxing game and 1970s/1980s Britain in collaboration with McMahon. The book was longlisted for the William Hill sports writer prize for 2010.

== Personal life ==
Christie was the uncle of Cyrus Christie, a professional footballer for Bolton Wanderers F.C. and the Irish national team.

=== Illness and death ===
In March 2015 Christie was diagnosed with small-cell lung cancer. He died at St. Christopher's Hospice in London on 11 June 2017 of complications from the disease, aged 53, and was buried in Hither Green Cemetery in Lewisham.

== Professional boxing record ==
41 fights	32 wins	8 losses
By knockout	26	7
By decision	6	1
Draws	1	

Key to abbreviations used for results
DQ	Disqualification	RTD	Corner retirement
KO	Knockout	SD	Split decision / split draw
MD	Majority decision / majority draw	TD	Technical decision / technical draw
NC	No contest	TKO	Technical knockout
PTS	Points decision	UD	Unanimous decision / unanimous draw

Boxing record
No.	Result	Record	Opponent	Type	Round(s)	Time	Date	Location	Notes
41	Loss	32–8–1	(United Kingdom) Trevor Ambrose	KO	2 (6)	?	19 Mar 1993	(United Kingdom) Free Trade Hall, Manchester, Greater Manchester, UK.	
40	Loss	32–7–1	(United Kingdom) Michael Watson	TKO	3 (10)	?	18 Nov 1990	(United Kingdom) National Exhibition Centre, Birmingham, West Midlands, UK.	
39	Draw	32–6–1	(United Kingdom) Stan King	PTS	8	N/a	18 Oct 1990	(United Kingdom) Latchmere Leisure Centre, Wandsworth, London, UK.	
38	Win	32–6	(United Kingdom) Karl Barwise	RTD	7 (8)	3:00	22 Sep 1990	(United Kingdom) Royal Albert Hall, Kensington, London, UK.	
37	Loss	31–6	(United Kingdom) Ian Strudwick	PTS	8	N/a	20 Jun 1990	(United Kingdom) Festival Hall, Basildon, Essex, UK	
36	Win	31–5	(United States) Thomas Covington	RTD	4 (8)	3:00	9 May 1990	(United Kingdom) Royal Albert Hall, Kensington, London, UK.	
35	Win	30–5	(France) Martin Camara	PTS	8	N/a	24 Oct 1989	(United Kingdom) York Hall, Bethnal Green, London, UK.	
34	Loss	29–5	(United Kingdom) James Cook	TKO	5 (8)	?	31 Jan 1989	(United Kingdom) York Hall, Bethnal Green, London, UK.	
33	Win	29–4	(United Kingdom) Winston Burnett	PTS	8	N/a	26 Oct 1988	(United Kingdom) Royal Albert Hall, Kensington, London, UK.	
32	Win	28–4	(United Kingdom) Joe McKenzie	KO	3 (8)	0:55	28 Sep 1988	(United Kingdom) Picketts Lock Stadium, Edmonton, London, UK.	
31	Win	27–4	(United Kingdom) Andy Wright	KO	2 (8)	?	30 Mar 1988	(United Kingdom) York Hall, Bethnal Green, London, UK.	
30	Loss	26–4	(Puerto Rico) Jose Quinones	KO	4 (8)	?	28 Nov 1987	(United Kingdom) Blazers Night Club, Windsor, Berkshire, UK.	
29	Win	26–3	(United States) Rafael Corona	KO	1 (8)	?	16 Sep 1987	(United Kingdom) Royal Albert Hall, Kensington, London, UK.	
28	Win	25–3	(United States) Tyrone McKnight	TKO	5 (10)	?	17 Jun 1987	(United Kingdom) Royal Albert Hall, Kensington, London, UK.	
27	Loss	24–3	(United States) Charles Boston	KO	8 (10)	2:10	3 Dec 1986	(United Kingdom) Alexandra Pavilion, Muswell Hill, London, UK.	
26	Win	24–2	(Republic of Ireland) Sean Mannion	PTS	10	N/a	29 Oct 1986	(United Kingdom) Alexandra Pavilion, Muswell Hill, London, UK.	
25	Win	23–2	(United States) Adam George	PTS	10	N/a	20 Sep 1986	(United Kingdom) Shendish Leisure Centre, Hemel Hempstead, Hertfordshire, UK.	
24	Win	22–2	(United Kingdom) Carlton Warren	TKO	5 (8)	?	28 May 1986	(United Kingdom) Alexandra Pavilion, Muswell Hill, London, UK.	
23	Win	21–2	(Nigeria) Hunter Clay	PTS	10	N/a	16 Apr 1986	(United Kingdom) Royalty Theatre, Holborn, London, UK.	
22	Loss	20–2	(United Kingdom) Mark Kaylor	KO	8 (12)	2:35	5 Nov 1985	(United Kingdom) Wembley Arena, Wembley, London, UK.	Final Eliminator for BBBofC Middleweight Title
21	Win	20–1	(United States) Barry Audia	TKO	2 (10)	2:34	18 Sep 1985	(United Kingdom) Alexandra Pavilion, Muswell Hill, London, UK.	
20	Win	19–1	(United States) Vincent Mays	TKO	1 (8)	2:34	30 May 1985	(United Kingdom) North Bridge Leisure Centre, Halifax, West Yorkshire, UK.	
19	Win	18–1	(United States) Ignacio Zavala	TKO	1 (10)	2:53	7 Mar 1985	(United Kingdom) Harvey Hadden Leisure Centre, Nottingham, Nottinghamshire, UK.	
18	Win	17–1	(Panama) Nestor Flores	KO	2 (10)	2:40	2 Feb 1985	(United Kingdom) Dolphin Centre, Darlington, County Durham, UK.	
17	Win	16–1	(Mexico) Gonzalo Montes	TKO	3 (10)	?	16 Jan 1985	(United Kingdom) Britannia Leisure Centre, Shoreditch, London, UK.	
16	Win	15–1	(United States) Cecil Pettigrew	TKO	1 (8)	0:36	15 Nov 1984	(United Kingdom) Stage One, Manchester, Greater Manchester, UK.	
15	Win	14–1	(United States) Bobby Hoye	KO	1 (10)	1:11	1 Nov 1984	(United Kingdom) North Bridge Leisure Centre, Halifax, West Yorkshire, UK.	
14	Loss	13–1	(Belgium) Jose Seys	KO	1 (8)	0:46	19 Sep 1984	(United Kingdom) Britannia Leisure Centre, Shoreditch, London, UK.	
13	Win	13–0	(United States) Stan White	TKO	5 (10)	1:10	15 Jun 1984	(United States) Caesars Palace, Paradise, Nevada, U.S.	
12	Win	12–0	(United States) Stacy McSwain	TKO	5 (10)	?	25 Apr 1984	(United Kingdom) Alexandra Pavilion, Muswell Hill, London, UK.	
