= Drivin' Around Song =

Single by Colt Ford featuring Jason Aldean

from the album Declaration of Independence
- Released: July 29, 2013
- Genre: Country rap
- Length: 3:40
- Label: Average Joes
- Songwriters: Chris Tompkins; Craig Wiseman
- Producer: Dann Huff

Colt Ford singles chronology
| "Back" (2012) | "Drivin' Around Song" (2013) | "The High Life" (2014) |

Jason Aldean singles chronology
| "Night Train" (2013) | "Drivin' Around Song" (2013) | "When She Says Baby" (2013) |

Drivin' Around Song is a song recorded by American country rap singer Colt Ford and country music singer Jason Aldean. It is the third single from his fourth studio album, Declaration of Independence. The song was written by Chris Tompkins and Craig Wiseman.

== Critical reception ==
Billy Dukes of Taste of Country gave the song three stars out of five, saying that "It’s the sort of chorus you’d find on, well … a Jason Aldean song. His voice blends seamlessly into the arrangement, which can’t be said about Ford’s lines. He patters over a thin banjo and drum machine until the build to the chorus. This leaves his gruff delivery to carry the story without the support of the energetic sound machine that makes him such a popular live act. That’s not the best use of his talent."

== Music video ==
The music video was directed by Potsy Ponciroli and premiered in October 2013. The video features footage of an ATV driving around Mooresville, North Carolina.

== Chart performance ==
"Drivin' Around Song" debuted at number 6 on the U.S. Billboard Bubbling Under Hot 100 chart.

| Chart (2013) | Peak position |
|---|---|
| US Bubbling Under Hot 100 (Billboard) | 6 |
| US Country Airplay (Billboard) | 56 |
| US Hot Country Songs (Billboard) | 41 |

== Certifications ==
| Region | Certification | Certified units/sales |
|---|---|---|
| United States (RIAA) | Platinum | 1,000,000^{‡} |
^{‡} Sales+streaming figures based on certification alone.
