= Back (song) =

Single by Colt Ford with Jake Owen

from the album Declaration of Independence
- Released: July 2, 2012
- Genre: Country; country rap
- Length: 4:02
- Label: Average Joes Entertainment
- Songwriter(s): Colt Ford; Noah Gordon; Mike Hartnett; Shannon Houchins
- Producer(s): Noah Gordon; Mike Hartnett; Shannon Houchins

Colt Ford singles chronology
"Answer to No One" (2012)	"Back" (2012)	"Drivin' Around Song" (2013)

Jake Owen singles chronology
"The One That Got Away" (2012)	"Back" (2012)	"Anywhere with You" (2013)

"Back" is a song co-written and recorded by American country rap artist Colt Ford. It is a duet with Jake Owen, and the second single from Ford's fourth studio album, Declaration of Independence.

== Critical reception ==
Ashley Cooke of Roughstock gave it a full 5 stars, saying that the song "genuinely tugs at your heart -strings. If you were lucky enough to grow up with memories similar to the lyrics in this song, you will find yourself in love with it just as I did." Billy Dukes of Taste of Country gave it 2.5 stars out of 5, saying that it was "about a verse too long" and that it "isn't a step backward, but it's no step forward."

== Chart performance ==
Chart (2012)	Peak position
US Country Airplay (Billboard)	50
US Hot Country Songs (Billboard)	40
