= Love Hope Faith =

Studio album by Colt Ford
- Released: May 5, 2017
- Genre: Country rap
- Label: Average Joes Entertainment
- Producer: Noah Gordon; Shannon "Fat Shan" Houchins

Colt Ford chronology
Thanks for Listening (2014)	Love Hope Faith (2017)	We the People, Volume 1 (2019)

Love Hope Faith is the sixth studio album by American country rap artist Colt Ford. Released on May 5, 2017, the work was published through Average Joes Entertainment.

== Content ==
As with Ford's previous albums, the album features multiple guest artists. Among those featured on this album are Brad Paisley, Toby Keith, Lit, Charles Kelley (of Lady Antebellum), and The Voice winner Javier Colon. The album also features Ford singing on several tracks instead of rapping.

== Critical reception ==
A review from Roughstock writer Matt Bjorke was positive, praising the variety of guest vocalists and the tracks on which Ford sings, such as "4 Lane Gone" and "Dirt Road Disco". He added that "the good times and good vibes found throughout Love Hope Faith will certainly appease longtime fans and newcomers alike."

== Commercial performance ==
The album debuted at No. 7 on the Top Country Albums chart, and No. 64 on Billboard 200, selling 9,600 copies in the first week. It sold a further 2,600 copies in the second week, making a total of 12,200 sold. It has sold 22,600 as of September 2017.

== Track listing ==
No.	Title	Writer(s)	Guest artist	Length
1.	"Reload"	Jared Sciullo, Charlie Farley, Austin Jenckes	Taylor Ray Holbrook	2:57
2.	"Dynamite"	Eric Dodd, Alex Hall	Waterloo Revival	3:07
3.	"Young Americans"	Sciullo, John Purdue, Renee Myers, Austin Webb	Charles Kelley and Josh Kelley	2:50
4.	"Dirt Road Disco"	Jaren Johnston, Neil Mason, Jesse Frasure		3:44
5.	"4 Lane Gone"	Kyle Fishman, Houston Phillips, Josh Thompson		3:51
6.	"My Truck"	Colt Ford, Jeremy Popoff, Dennis Hill, Gary Wright	Tyler Farr	3:26
7.	"Lookin' For a Hand Out"	Ford, Jeff Hyde	Brad Paisley	3:32
8.	"Time Flies"	Ford, Justin David	Toby Keith	3:27
9.	"No Rest"	Walker Hayes, Thomas Archer, Marshall Altman	Javier Colon	3:32
10.	"I'm Mud"	Charley Farley, Daniel Lee	Lit	3:17
11.	"Bad Day"	Jeffrey Steele, Popoff, Shane Minor, Vicky McGehee	Rizzi Myers	3:46
12.	"Drunk Girl"	Trent Tomlinson, Jimmy Ritchey, Ed Hill		2:55
13.	"Keepin' It Real"	Rodney Clawson, Chris Tompkins, David Lee Murphy	Granger Smith	3:23

== Charts ==
Chart (2017)	Peak position
US Billboard 200	64
US Independent Albums (Billboard)	5
US Top Country Albums (Billboard)	7
US Top Rap Albums (Billboard)	23
