= We the People, Volume 1 =

Studio album by Colt Ford
- Released: September 20, 2019
- Genre: Country; country rap; country rock; rap rock
- Length: 44:11
- Label: Average Joes Entertainment
- Producer: Noah Gordon; Shannon Houchins; Phivestarr; DJ KO

Colt Ford chronology
Love Hope Faith (2017)	We the People, Volume 1 (2019)	Must Be the Country (2023)

Singles from We the People, Volume 1
- 1. "We the People" Released: May 28, 2019; 2. "Slow Ride" Released: September 5, 2019

We the People, Volume 1 is the seventh studio album by American country rap artist Colt Ford. The album was released on September 20, 2019, through Ford's label Average Joes Entertainment. It includes the singles "We the People" and " Slow Ride".

== Background ==
Ford stated that when making this album, he "let the feeling of the songs guide me", rather than attempting to follow supposed guidelines or unwritten rules.

== Track listing ==
We the People, Volume 1
No.	Title	Writer(s)	Guest artist	Length
1.	"I'm Still Me"	Colt Ford, Sam Grow, George Birge, Taylor Phillips		2:52
2.	"Slow Ride"	Ford, Phillips, Josh Mirenda, Jared Sciullo, Justin David Bertoldie	Mitchell Tenpenny	2:54
3.	"We the People"	Corey Crowder, James McNair, Brandon Kinney		2:34
4.	"Back to them Backroads"	Ford, Phillips, Mirenda, Sciullo, Bertoldie	Jimmie Allen	3:11
5.	"Red White Blue & Blessed"	Ben Hayslip, J.T. Harding, Matt Jenkins	Walker Montgomery	3:05
6.	"Nightcap"	Tyler Hubbard, Brian Kelley, Russell Dickerson, David Garcia, Josh Miller	Michael Ray	3:20
7.	"Lucky Stars"	Ford, Jeffrey Steele, Gregory Alan Moye	Eddie Montgomery	3:35
8.	"Where the Water Is"	Walker Hayes, Thomas Archer	Dan Tyminski	2:51
9.	"Bring That "W" Home"	Hayslip, David Lee Murphy, Jimmy Yeary		3:22
10.	"Cooter Brown"	Brad Warren, Brett Warren, Morgan Wallen, Chris Stevens	Larry Fleet	3:28
11.	"Bass Like That"	Phillips, Matt Roy, Trea Landon, John Gurney	Dan Tyminski	2:57
12.	"Time Machine"	Phillips, Roy, Erik Dylan, Brock Berryhill		2:59
13.	"How You Lose a Woman"	Noah Gordon, Lance Miller, Wade Kirby		2:57
14.	"We the People" (remix)	Crowder, McNair, Kinney	DJ KO	4:00
Total length:				44:11

== Charts ==
Chart (2019)	Peak position
US Independent Albums (Billboard)	9
US Top Country Albums (Billboard)	42

== Release history ==
Release formats for We the People, Volume 1
Country	Date	Format	Label	Ref.
Various	September 20, 2019	Compact disc; digital download; streaming	Average Joes Entertainment	
