= Chicken & Biscuits =

Studio album by Colt Ford
- Released: April 20, 2010
- Genre: Country rap
- Length: 51:56
- Label: Average Joe's Entertainment
- Producer: Jayson Chance; Shannon Houchins; Q Sick

Colt Ford chronology
Live from the Suwannee River Jam (2009)	Chicken & Biscuits (2010)	Every Chance I Get (2011)

Singles from Chicken & Biscuits
- 1. "Chicken & Biscuits" Released: April 19, 2010

Professional ratings
Review scores
Source	Rating
Allmusic	3.5/5 stars
Country Weekly	3/5 stars
Roughstock	4/5 stars

Chicken & Biscuits is the second studio album by American country rap artist Colt Ford. It was released on April 20, 2010 via Average Joe's Entertainment. The album features the single "Chicken & Biscuits" in two versions: one with James Otto, and the other, a radio edit featuring Rhean Boyer of Carolina Rain.

The album has sold 93,613 copies in the U.S. as of August 18, 2010.

== Critical reception ==
Matt Bjorke of Roughstock gave the album four stars out of five, with his review saying that "Ford has tapped into something unique and that is the exact reason why he’s sold as many albums he has the past couple of years." The album received a three-star rating from Country Weekly reviewer Jessica Phillips, who praised Ford's "guttural voice and well-rendered rhymes" and considered Ford's musical image more country-oriented than that of Cowboy Troy, but called "Tool Timer" and "All About Y'all" "disposable." Paul Brian of Engine 145 gave the title track a thumbs-up, saying that its lyrics were cliché but that it "its infectious energy grows on you."

== Track listing ==
No.	Title	Length
1.	"Chicken & Biscuits" (featuring James Otto)	3:06
2.	"Hey Y'all" (featuring Randy Houser)	2:57
3.	"Diggin'"	3:57
4.	"Mud Flap" (featuring Ty Stone)	2:53
5.	"All About Y'all" (featuring Josh Gracin)	2:54
6.	"Nothing in Particular" (featuring Sunny Ledfurd)	3:47
7.	"Tool Timer" (featuring Darryl Worley)	3:48
8.	"Cricket on a Line" (featuring Rhett Akins)	3:35
9.	"She Ain't Too Good for That" (featuring Joe Nichols)	2:50
10.	"Convoy"	4:12
11.	"Hip Hop in a Honky Tonk" (featuring Kevin Fowler)	2:49
12.	"Ride On, Ride Out" (featuring Darryl McDaniels of Run-D.M.C.)	3:15
13.	"Country Kids" (featuring Rachel Farley)	3:12
14.	"Trailer Park Pulp Fiction" (featuring Ira Dean)	2:52
15.	"We Like to Hunt"	2:42
16.	"Chicken & Biscuits (radio edit)" (featuring Rhean Boyer of Carolina Rain)	3:06

== Chart performance ==
=== Weekly charts ===
Chart (2010)	Peak position
US Billboard 200	28
US Top Country Albums (Billboard)	8
US Independent Albums (Billboard)	4
US Top Rap Albums (Billboard)	4

=== Year-end charts ===
Chart (2010)	Position
US Top Country Albums (Billboard)	48
Chart (2011)	Position
US Top Country Albums (Billboard)	69

=== Singles ===
Year	Single	Peak chart positions
Year	Single	US Country
2010	"Chicken & Biscuits"	60
