= Ride Through the Country =

Studio album by Colt Ford
- Released: December 2, 2008
- Genre: Country rap
- Length: 53:15
- Label: Average Joe's Entertainment
- Producers: Shannon Houchins, Jared Sciullo, Justin Spillner, Scott Weatherwax, Jeremy Popoff

Colt Ford chronology
Ride Through the Country (2008)	Country Is as Country Does (2009)

Singles from Ride Through the Country
- 1. "No Trash in My Trailer" Released: 2009; 2. "Ride Through the Country" Released: 2009; 3. "Cold Beer" Released: 2010

Professional ratings
Review scores
Source	Rating
Roughstock	

Ride Through the Country is the debut album released by country rap artist Colt Ford. It was released on December 2, 2008, on the independent Average Joe's label. It features guest appearances by John Michael Montgomery on the title track (which was released as the album lead-off single) as well as an appearance from Jamey Johnson on "Cold Beer". "Dirt Road Anthem" was later re-recorded by co-writer Brantley Gilbert on his album Halfway to Heaven, and covered and made famous by Jason Aldean for his album My Kinda Party, both from 2010, while "Gangsta of Love" featuring Bone Crusher interpolates the Steve Miller Band's 1973 chart-topping hit "The Joker".

As of August 6, 2014, the album has sold over 1,000,000 copies in the United States without the benefit of a major radio single.

== Critical reception ==
Matt Bjorke of Roughstock compared the album to a Cowboy Troy album. Bjorke stated "Cowboy Troy's fun music often felt like a novelty, Colt Ford's Ride Through The Country is an underground, indie rap album that recalls southern rapper Bubba Sparxxx."

== Track listing ==
No.	Title	Writer(s)	Length
1.	"Ride Through the Country" (duet with John Michael Montgomery)	C. Ford, S. Houchins, D. Jones, J. Scuillo, J. Spillner	4:34
2.	"Mr. Goodtime"	Ford, Houchins, Scuillo, Spillner	3:53
3.	"No Trash in My Trailer (Revisited)"	Mike Dekle, Ford, Byron Hill	3:25
4.	"Cold Beer" (duet with Jamey Johnson)	Ford, Houchins, Scuillo, Spillner	3:42
5.	"Never Thought" (duet with Lindsey Hager)	Ford, K. Garrity, Scuillo, Spillner	3:53
6.	"Saddle Up" (featuring Attitude)	T. Clayton, Ford, Scuillo, Spillner	3:58
7.	"Waffle House" (featuring Sunny Ledfurd)	D. Bakalli, Ford, S. Weatherwax	4:18
8.	"Twisted"	Ford, W. Hardnett, Weatherwax	4:22
9.	"Tailgate"	Ford, J. Johnson, J. Popoff	3:48
10.	"Dirt Road Anthem" (featuring Brantley Gilbert)	Ford, B. Gilbert	3:44
11.	"Good God O'Mighty"	Ford, Houchins, Scuillo, Spillner	3:35
12.	"Like Me"	Ford, D. Stanley, Weatherwax	3:45
13.	"Gangsta of Love" (featuring Bone Crusher)	E. Curtis, A. Ertegun, Ford, Hardnett, S. Miller, Scuillo, Spillner	3:46
14.	"I Can't Sing"	Ford, Weatherwax	2:30

=== Revisited album ===
The album was re-released on five years later as Ride Through the Country (Revisited) on September 30, 2013, with new versions as well the original versions of the hit songs.

No.	Title	Writer(s)	Length
1.	"Ride Through the Country" (featuring John Michael Montgomery, Ronnie Dunn & Joe Diffie)	C. Ford, S. Houchins, D. Jones, J. Scuillo, J. Spillner	5:11
2.	"Mr. Goodtime" (duet with Ronnie Dunn)	Ford, Houchins, Scuillo, Spillner	3:56
3.	"No Trash In My Trailer (Revisited)" (duet with Joe Diffie)	Mike Dekle, Ford, Byron Hill	3:25
4.	"Cold Beer" (duet with Jamey Johnson)	Ford, Houchins, Scuillo, Spillner	3:42
5.	"Never Thought" (duet with Wynonna Judd)	Ford, K. Garrity, Scuillo, Spillner	4:25
6.	"Saddle Up" (featuring Charlie Farley & Attitude)	T. Clayton, Ford, Scuillo, Spillner	3:58
7.	"Waffle House" (duet with John Anderson)	D. Bakalli, Ford, S. Weatherwax	4:28
8.	"Twisted"	Ford, W. Hardnett, Weatherwax	4:22
9.	"Tailgate" (featuring with The Lacs)	Ford, J. Johnson, J. Popoff	3:48
10.	"Dirt Road Anthem" (featuring Brantley Gilbert)	Ford, B. Gilbert	3:44
11.	"Good God O'Mighty"	Ford, Houchins, Scuillo, Spillner	3:35
12.	"Like Me" (featuring Charlie Daniels)	Ford, D. Stanley, Weatherwax	3:45
13.	"Gangsta of Love" (featuring Bone Crusher)	E. Curtis, A. Ertegun, Ford, Hardnett, S. Miller, Scuillo, Spillner	3:46
14.	"I Can't Sing"	Ford, Weatherwax	2:30
15.	"Ride Through the Country" (duet with John Michael Montgomery)	C. Ford, S. Houchins, D. Jones, J. Scuillo, J. Spillner	4:34

== Personnel ==
- Kelly Back- electric guitar
- Bone Crusher- vocals on "Gangsta of Love"
- Gary Burnette- electric guitar
- Carmelita Diane Davis- background vocals
- Tiffany Davis- background vocals
- David Warner Ellis- dobro, fiddle
- Colt Ford- lead vocals
- Brantley Gilbert- acoustic guitar and vocals on "Dirt Road Anthem"
- Kevin "Swine" Grantt- bass guitar
- Lindsey Hager- vocals on "Never Thought"
- Rob Hajacos- fiddle
- Jamey Johnson- vocals on "Cold Beer" and "Saddle Up"
- Wayne Killius- drums
- Sunny Ledford- vocals on "Waffle House"
- Catherine Styron Marx- keyboards, piano
- John Michael Montgomery- electric guitar and vocals on "Ride Through the Country"
- Anthony Randolph- piano
- Scotty Sanders- steel guitar
- Paul Scholton- drums
- Cory Sellers- background vocals
- Michael Spriggs- acoustic guitar
- Jason Sylvain- background vocals
- Adrian Young- drums

== Chart performance ==
=== Weekly charts ===
Chart (2009–2013)	Peak position
US Billboard 200	97
US Top Country Albums (Billboard)	24
US Heatseekers Albums (Billboard)	2
US Independent Albums (Billboard)	18
US Top Rap Albums (Billboard)	12

=== Year-end charts ===
Chart (2009)	Position
US Top Country Albums (Billboard)	61

=== Singles ===
Year	Single	Peak chart positions
Year	Single	US Country
2009	"No Trash in My Trailer (Revisited)"	—
2009	"Ride Through the Country"	57
2010	"Cold Beer"	53
"—" denotes releases that did not chart
