= JB and the Moonshine Band =

American country music group

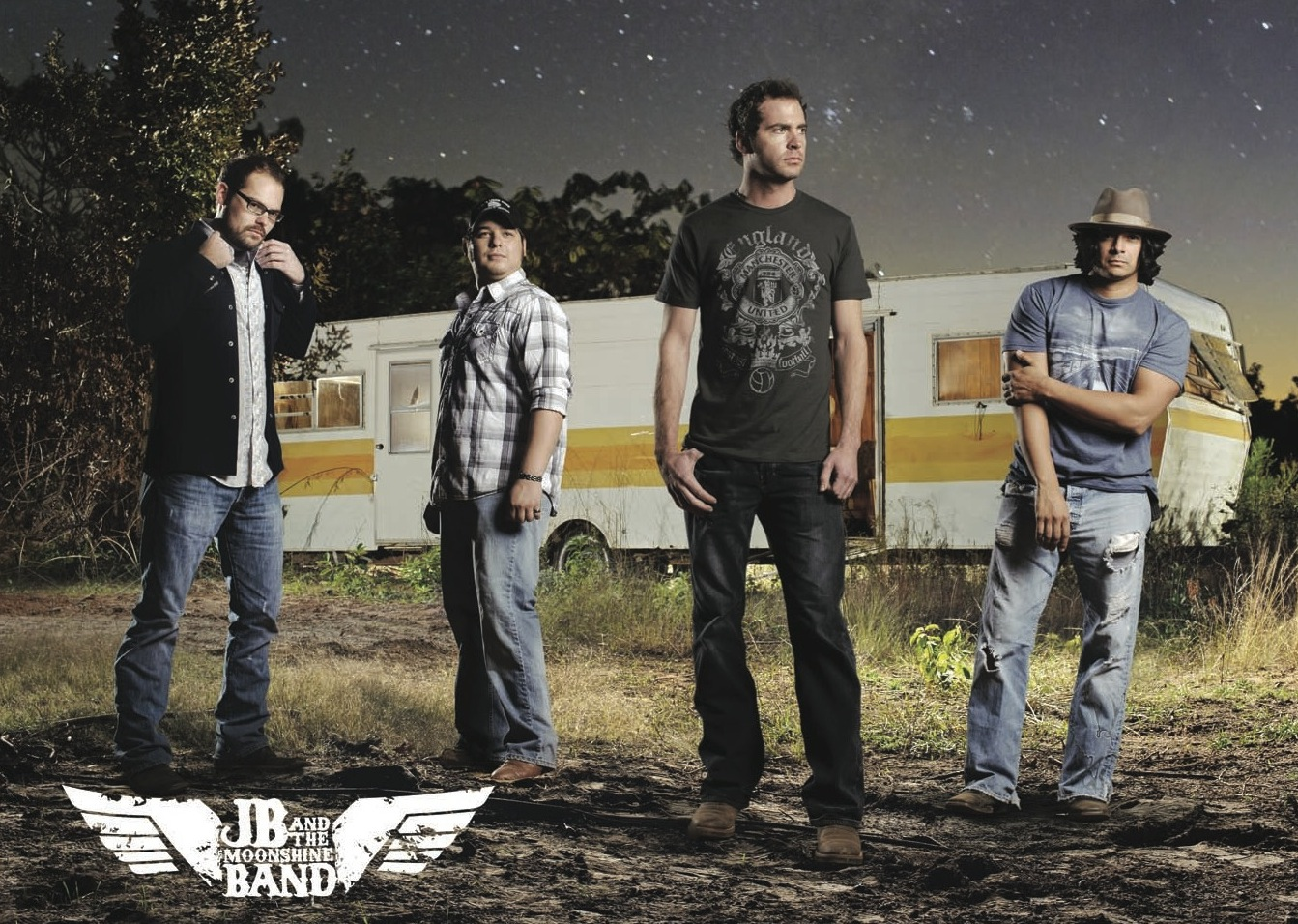

Background information
- Origin: Palestine, Texas, United States
- Genre: Country
- Years active: 2009-present
- Label: Average Joe's
- Members: JB Patterson; Gabe Guevara; Hayden McMullen; Chris Flores
- Website: www.jbandthemoonshineband.com

JB and the Moonshine Band is an American Texas country group from East Texas composed of JB Patterson, Gabe Guevara, Hayden McMullen and Chris Flores. In 2010, they signed to Colt Ford's record label, Average Joe's Entertainment. Their 2012 album Beer for Breakfast charted on the Billboard Top Country Albums chart.

== History ==
In early 2009, front man JB Patterson, lead vocalist, songwriter and rhythm guitarist for the band, gave up his advertising career to pursue his dream of being a songwriter, and listed an open casting call for musicians in his community. Turnout for the audition was small; only three people showed up, but three was enough. Gabe Guevara, Hayden McMullen and Chris Flores were immediately dubbed "the Moonshine Band." After their first show at a local honky-tonk, JB and the boys began touring, and with a jury-rigged PA system and a rented U-Haul van, the band travelled through East Texas, quickly gaining a local following.

The group’s big break came while opening for Average Joe's Entertainment artist Colt Ford in March 2010. The band’s country sound and outlaw attitude immediately caught the attention of Colt’s team in Nashville, TN, and in July 2010 JB and the Moonshine Band signed a record deal with Average Joe's Entertainment. Label mates include country singer/songwriter Colt Ford, American Idol finalist Josh Gracin, and award-winning country duo Montgomery Gentry. The band’s debut album, “Ain’t Goin' Back to Jail” premiered in September 2010, with Gabe Guevara on drums, Hayden McMullen on lead guitar, Chris Flores on bass guitar and JB providing lead vocals, banjo, and acoustic guitar. JB also serves as the band’s lyricist, writing all of the songs on the record.

JB and the Moonshine Band's second album, "Beer For Breakfast" was released March 6, 2012.

== Notable accomplishments ==
The first single from the Ain't Goin' Back to Jail debut album was "Perfect Girl" and was the fasting-raising debut single in 2010 and is the #1 Most Requested Song on XM Nashville 11, with over 2,300 digital sales a week. The single has gained over 1,090,000 YouTube views and has already sold over 50,000 paid single downloads on iTunes. Currently, the band's YouTube channel has had over 2,000,000 views.

The music video for "Perfect Girl" was also featured on CMT Pure's 12 Pack for months and peaked at #7. It was later nominated for CMT's Top 30 Videos of 2011.

The second single from their debut album, "Whiskey Days" peaked at #7 on Billboard's Texas Regional Radio Report. The third single, "Love Don't Let You Decide" peaked at #15 on the Texas Regional Radio Report.

In 2011, JB and the Moonshine Band were nominated for two awards at the Texas Radio Report Awards for "Best Video" and "Best New Group."

JB Patterson co-wrote the #1 hit single "Double-Wide Dream" on the Texas Regional Radio Report for the week of January 15. The single was cowritten with the frontman from Casey Donahew Band of Texas. The video for the single has recently been played on CMT's show "High 5" which features the top five most played songs on CMT.com.

The sophomore album, "Beer For Breakfast" debuted at No. 4 on iTunes Country Albums day of its release, March 6. The album debuted at No. 31 on Billboard's Country Chart, No. 31 on Billboard's Independent Albums and at No. 7 on Billboard's Heatseekers Chart.

The third album Mixtape was released on June 30, 2015. It debuted on the Top Country Albums chart at No. 33, selling 2,600 copies for the week.

== Discography ==
=== Studio albums ===
Title	Album details	Peak chart positions		
Title	Album details	US Country	US Heat	US Indie
Ain't Goin' Back to Jail	Release date: September 21, 2010; Label: Average Joe's Entertainment	—	—	—
Beer for Breakfast	Release date: March 6, 2012; Label: Average Joe's Entertainment	31	7	31
Mixtape	Release date: June 30, 2015; Label: Light It Up Records	33	4	—
"—" denotes releases that did not chart

=== Singles ===
Year	Single	Album
2010	"Whiskey Days"	Ain't Goin' Back to Jail
2010	"Missin' You Again"	Ain't Goin' Back to Jail
2011	"Perfect Girl"	Ain't Goin' Back to Jail
2011	"Love Don't Let You Decide"	Ain't Goin' Back to Jail
2011	"Ain't Goin' Back to Jail"	Ain't Goin' Back to Jail
2012	"Beer For Breakfast"	Beer for Breakfast
2012	"No Better Than This"	Beer for Breakfast
2012	"Kiss Me That Way"	Beer for Breakfast
2013	"The Only Drug"	Beer for Breakfast
2013	"I'm Down"	Beer for Breakfast
2014	"Yes"	Beer for Breakfast
2015	"Shotgun, Rifle, and a. 45"	Mixtape
2016	"Wagon"	Mixtape
2017	"Mess Outta Me"	Mixtape
2018	"How Can I Miss You"	Mixtape

=== Guest singles ===
Year	Single	Artist	Album
2011	"What I Call Home"	Colt Ford	Every Chance I Get

=== Music videos ===
Year	Video	Director
2011	"Perfect Girl"	Mason Dixon
2011	"Whiskey Days"	Matthew Hogan/Daniel Poe
2011	"I'm Down"	Matthew Hogan/Daniel Poe
2011	"What I Call Home" (with Colt Ford)	Peter Lippman
2012	"No Better Than This"	David Poag
2012	"Kiss Me That Way"	Josh Carter
2013	"The Only Drug"	Potsy Ponciroli
2014	"Yes"	David Poag
2015	"Shotgun, Rifle, and a .45"	Patrick Tracy
2016	"Wagon"	Gregory R. Alosio
2017	"Mess Outta Me"	Peter Zavadil
2018	"How Can I Miss You"	Trey Fanjoy
