= Every Chance I Get (album) =

Studio album by Colt Ford
- Released: May 3, 2011
- Genre: Country rap
- Length: 44:08
- Label: Average Joe's Entertainment
- Producer: Jayson Chance; Shannon Houchins; Phive Starr; Scott Weatherwax

Colt Ford chronology
| Chicken & Biscuits (2010) | Every Chance I Get (2011) | Declaration of Independence (2012) |

Singles from Every Chance I Get
- 1. "Country Thang" Released: February 7, 2011; 2. "She Likes to Ride in Trucks" Released: June 20, 2011; 3. "What I Call Home" Released: October 10, 2011

Professional ratings
Review scores
| Source | Rating |
|---|---|
| Allmusic | 4/5 stars |

Every Chance I Get is the third studio album by American country rap artist Colt Ford. It was released on May 3, 2011 through Average Joe's Entertainment Group.

The album includes the singles "Country Thang", featuring Eric Church, "She Likes To Ride In Trucks", featuring Craig Morgan. and "What I Call Home", featuring JB and the Moonshine Band. The original version of the single "Country Thang", which features Dallas Davidson on chorus vocals, does not appear on the album. As of the chart dated July 16, 2011, the album has sold 73,300 copies in the US.

== Critical reception ==
Giving it four stars out of five, Steve Leggett of Allmusic thought that the album was "better" than Ford's first two. He also called Ford "a sly, passionate, and multi-layered writer". As of Oct. 2012 the album has sold 145,211.

== Track listing ==
| No. | Title | Length |
|---|---|---|
| 1. | "Country Thang" (featuring Eric Church) | 2:52 |
| 2. | "Work It Out" (featuring Luke Bryan) | 2:36 |
| 3. | "Waste Some Time" (featuring Nappy Roots and Nic Cowan) | 4:55 |
| 4. | "Do It with My Eyes Closed" (featuring Josh Thompson) | 2:54 |
| 5. | "This Is Our Song" (featuring Danny Boone of Rehab) | 3:48 |
| 6. | "Titty's Beer" (featuring Trent Tomlinson) | 3:30 |
| 7. | "She Likes to Ride in Trucks" (featuring Craig Morgan) | 3:25 |
| 8. | "Pipe the Sunshine In" (featuring Tyler Farr) | 2:56 |
| 9. | "Every Chance I Get" | 2:58 |
| 10. | "What I Call Home" (featuring JB and the Moonshine Band) | 4:07 |
| 11. | "Overworked & Underpaid" (featuring Charlie Daniels) | 3:10 |
| 12. | "Skirts & Boots" (featuring Frankie Ballard) | 2:40 |
| 13. | "Twisted" (featuring Tim McGraw) | 4:17 |

== Charts ==
=== Weekly charts ===
| Chart (2011) | Peak position |
|---|---|
| US Billboard 200 | 26 |
| US Top Country Albums (Billboard) | 3 |
| US Independent Albums (Billboard) | 5 |
| US Top Rap Albums (Billboard) | 3 |

=== Year-end charts ===
| Chart (2011) | Position |
|---|---|
| US Top Country Albums (Billboard) | 54 |
| US Independent Albums (Billboard) | 27 |

=== Singles ===
| Year | Single | Peak chart positions |
| Year | Single | US Country |
|---|---|---|
| 2011 | "Country Thang" | 54 |
| 2011 | "She Likes to Ride in Trucks" (with Craig Morgan) | — |
| 2011 | "What I Call Home" (with JB and the Moonshine Band) | — |
"—" denotes releases that did not chart
