= Declaration of Independence (album) =

Studio album by Colt Ford
- Released: August 7, 2012
- Genre: Country rap
- Label: Average Joe's Entertainment
- Producer: Noah Gordon; Mike Hartnett; Shannon Houchins; Dann Huff; Phive Starr; Terry Smith

Colt Ford chronology
| Every Chance I Get (2011) | Declaration of Independence (2012) | Thanks for Listening (2014) |

Singles from Declaration of Independence
- 1. "Answer to No One" Released: 2012; 2. "Back" Released: July 2, 2012; 3. "Drivin' Around Song" Released: July 29, 2013

Professional ratings
Review scores
| Source | Rating |
|---|---|
| Allmusic | 3.5/5 stars |
| Associated Press | favorable |
| Roughstock | 4/5 stars |
| Country Standard Time | mixed |

Declaration of Independence is the fourth studio album by American country rap artist Colt Ford. It was released on August 7, 2012, through Average Joe's Entertainment Group. The album includes the singles "Answer to No One," "Back" and "Drivin' Around Song."

== Reviews ==
An uncredited review from the Associated Press was favorable, saying that "Ford not only illustrates that country music can continue to draw on other contemporary musical styles, he also shows that modern-era rednecks can mix with the rest of the world, too." Bobby Peacock of Roughstock rated it four stars out of five, similarly saying that it "finds him once again bridging the gap between two diametrically opposite genres with skill." Giving it three-and-a-half stars out of five, Stephen Thomas Erlewine of Allmusic compared the sound to Kid Rock, saying that Ford had "swagger" and "bravado". Sam Gazdziak of Country Standard Time gave a mixed review, praising "All In" and "Way Too Early" as the countriest-sounding, and calling "Angels & Demuns" a standout, but criticizing some of the songs' themes by saying that "The 'country pride' songs dominate, and there are so many of them saying essentially the same thing that they become indistinguishable." As of Oct. 28,2012 the album has sold 106,000 copies.

== Track listing ==
| No. | Title | Writer(s) | Length |
|---|---|---|---|
| 1. | "Answer to No One" (with JJ Lawhorn) | Colt Ford; Noah Gordon; Mike Hartnett; Shannon Houchins | 3:32 |
| 2. | "Drivin' Around Song" (with Jason Aldean) | Chris Tompkins; Craig Wiseman | 3:40 |
| 3. | "All In" (with Kix Brooks) | Ford; Gordon; Hartnett; Houchins | 3:16 |
| 4. | "Ain't Out of the Woods" (with Montgomery Gentry) | Ford | 3:04 |
| 5. | "Lucky" (with Jonathan Singleton) | Ford; Wiseman | 3:09 |
| 6. | "Back" (with Jake Owen) | Ford; Gordon; Hartnett; Houchins | 4:02 |
| 7. | "Dancin' While Intoxicated (DWI)" (with LoCash Cowboys and Redneck Social Club) | Ford; Lex Lipsitz | 3:55 |
| 8. | "It's All" (with Jeffrey Steele) | Ford; Jeffrey Steele | 3:43 |
| 9. | "Hugh Damn Right" (with Laura Bell Bundy) | Ford; Wiseman | 3:43 |
| 10. | "Room at the Bar" (with Corey Smith) | Ford; Terry Smith | 3:19 |
| 11. | "All of My Tomorrows" (with Russell Dickerson) | Ford; Gordon; Dakota Bradley | 3:09 |
| 12. | "Happy in Hell" (with Wanya Morris) | Ford | 3:58 |
| 13. | "50/50" | Ford; Wiseman | 2:50 |
| 14. | "Way Too Early" (with Darius Rucker) | Ford; Ben Hayslip | 2:46 |
| 15. | "Angels & Demuns" (with Lamar Williams, Jr.) | Ford; Wiseman | 6:38 |

== Production ==
Producer: Dann Huff: Tracks 2, 5, 8 and 11

Producer: Mike Hartnett and Corey Smith: Track 10

Producer: Phive Starr: Tracks 7 and 12

Producer: Shannon Houchins: Tracks 1, 3, 4, 6, 9, 13, 14 and 15

Mixing: Billy Decker: Tracks 1, 3, 4, 6, 9, 12, 13, 14 and 15

Mixing: Justin Niebank: Tracks 2, 5, 8 and 11

Mixing: Phive Starr: Track 7

Mixing: Billy Hume: Track 10

Mastering - Noah Gordon

== Charts ==
=== Weekly charts ===
| Chart (2012) | Peak position |
|---|---|
| US Billboard 200 | 5 |
| US Top Country Albums (Billboard) | 1 |
| US Independent Albums (Billboard) | 1 |
| US Top Rap Albums (Billboard) | 60 |

=== Year-end charts ===
| Chart (2012) | Position |
|---|---|
| US Top Country Albums (Billboard) | 45 |
| US Independent Albums (Billboard) | 24 |

| Chart (2013) | Position |
|---|---|
| US Top Country Albums (Billboard) | 53 |

=== Singles ===
| Year | Single | Peak chart positions | | |
| Year | Single | US Country | US Country Airplay | US |
|---|---|---|---|---|
| 2012 | "Answer to No One" (with JJ Lawhorn) | — | — | — |
| 2012 | "Back" (with Jake Owen) | 40 | 50 | — |
| 2013 | "Drivin' Around Song" (with Jason Aldean) | 41 | 56 | 106 |
"—" denotes releases that did not chart
