= Colt Ford =

American rapper and songwriter (born 1969)

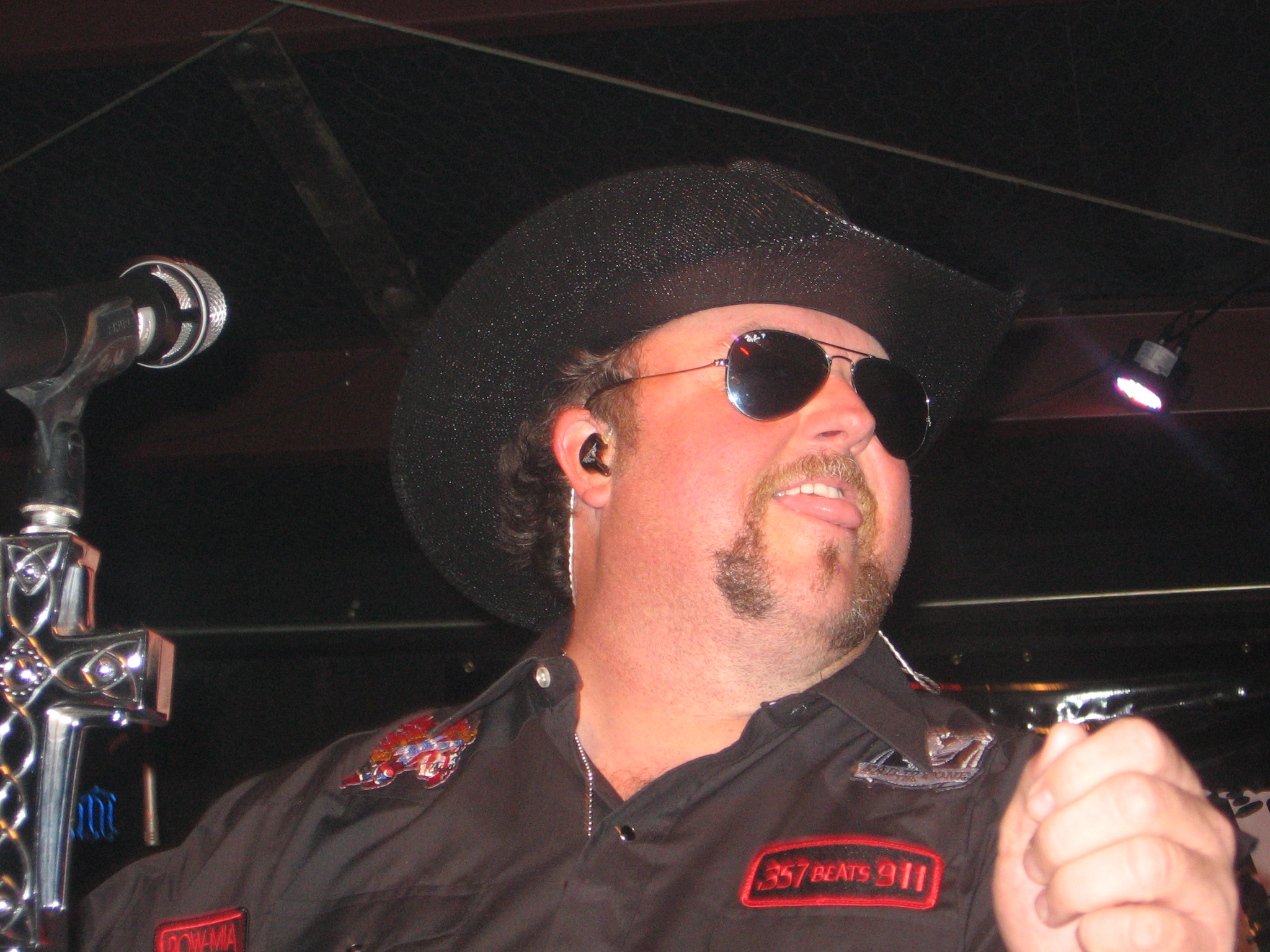
- Ford in 2010

Background information
- Born: Jason Farris Brown; August 27, 1969 (age 57)
- Origin: Athens, Georgia, U.S.
- Genres: Country rap; country
- Occupations: Singer; songwriter; rapper; record label owner
- Instruments: Vocals; guitar
- Years active: 2006–present
- Label: Average Joes
- Website: coltford.com

Jason Farris Brown (born August 27, 1969), known professionally as Colt Ford, is an American country rap musician, songwriter, entrepreneur, and former professional golfer. He is also the co-founder of record label Average Joes Entertainment. Ford has released seven albums through Average Joes and has charted multiple singles on the Billboard Hot Country Songs and Country Airplay charts. In addition, he co-wrote "Dirt Road Anthem" (made famous by Jason Aldean), "Country Must Be Country Wide" for Brantley Gilbert, and "Mind on You" for George Birge.

== Biography ==
Jason Farris Brown was born and raised in Athens, Georgia. He was a professional golfer, playing on the Nationwide Tour. Later, he turned his interests to music, taking influence from country music and hip hop. Assuming the stage name Colt Ford, he released his debut album, Ride Through the Country, on December 2, 2008, through Average Joes Entertainment, which he cofounded. This album included the singles "No Trash in My Trailer" (a cover of a Mike Dekle/Byron Hill song) and "Ride Through the Country" (a duet with John Michael Montgomery), the latter of which did not chart until the week of October 10, 2009, when it debuted at number 57 on Hot Country

He also appeared on a rap remix of Montgomery Gentry's late-2008 Number One single "Roll with Me". Ford's debut album also has guest appearances from country singer Jamey Johnson, as well as Bone Crusher and Jermaine Dupri, Adrian Young of No Doubt, and Jeremy Popoff of Lit. The album did not enter the Billboard albums charts until 2009.

Ford co-wrote and originally recorded the song "Dirt Road Anthem" for his debut album Ride Through the Country; it was later re-recorded by Brantley Gilbert, who co-wrote and featured on the song, on his 2010 album Halfway to Heaven, and famously covered by Jason Aldean on his album My Kinda Party, also from 2010.

Ford wrote the theme song "Buck 'em" for the Professional Bull Riders association. He also appears as a guest vocalist on the track "Tailgatin'" on Cledus T. Judd's 2009 album Polyrically Uncorrect, a song which Ford wrote with Johnson and Popoff. Ford's second studio album, Chicken & Biscuits, was released in April 2010, following the release of its title track.

Ford released a third studio album on May 3, 2011, called Every Chance I Get. The album's lead-off single, "Country Thang", debuted at number 55 for the country chart week ending February 19, 2011. "She Likes to Ride in Trucks", featuring Craig Morgan, served as the album's second single.

Ford's fourth album, Declaration of Independence, became his first number 1 album on Top Country Albums. Its first charted single is "Back", a duet with Jake Owen. "Back" is Ford's highest charting single to date, making Top 40 on Hot Country Songs. In 2012, Ford headlined the Declaration Of Independence Tour with supporting acts The Lacs, Lenny Cooper, and JB and the Moonshine Band. In the fall of 2012 Ford announced he would be touring with JJ Lawhorn on the Answer To No One Tour.

Ford's fifth studio album, Thanks for Listening, was released on July 1, 2014.

"4 Lane Gone" is the first single from his sixth studio album, Love Hope Faith. Ford released a music video for the single on September 11, 2016 Love Hope Faith was released on May 5, 2017.

Ford's next album We the People, Volume 1 was released in September 2019.

In 2023, Ford was featured on Australian country rock artist Jayne Denham's single "Moonshine", the title track and debut single from her sixth studio album of the same name.

On April 5, 2024, Ford suffered a heart attack after a concert in Arizona, and was placed in intensive care soon after. In an interview after being released from the hospital, Ford revealed that his heart stopped three times and a doctor told him he had a .1% chance of surviving. After rehabilitation that included learning to walk again, Ford returned to touring in 2025.

== Discography ==
- Ride Through the Country (2008)
- Chicken & Biscuits (2010)
- Every Chance I Get (2011)
- Declaration of Independence (2012)
- Thanks for Listening (2014)
- Love Hope Faith (2017)
- We the People, Volume 1 (2019)
- Must Be the Country (2023)

== Awards and nominations ==
Year	Association	Category	Result
2011	Academy of Country Music Awards	Vocal Event of the Year — "Cold Beer" (with Jamey Johnson)	Nominated
