= Lonestar discography =

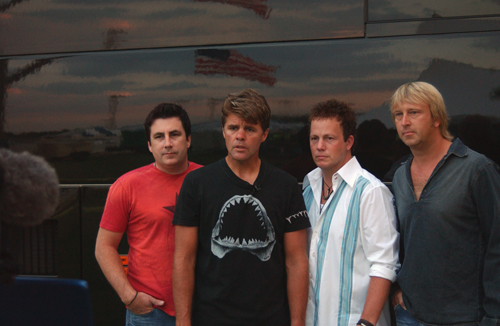
- Lonestar in 2005
- Studio albums: 12
- Extended plays: 2
- Compilation albums: 5
- Singles: 35
- Music videos: 20

Lonestar is an American country music band founded in 1992 by Richie McDonald, John Rich, Keech Rainwater, Michael Britt and Dean Sams. The band has released 12 studio albums, five compilation albums, and 35 singles. Lonestar's first five releases for BNA Records are all certified Gold or higher by the RIAA, and their 2003 greatest hits album is certified Platinum. The band's highest-certified album is 1999's Lonely Grill at 3× Platinum. An eighth album, Party Heard Around the World, was released in April 2010. This was also the only album to feature lead singer Cody Collins, who replaced McDonald and served as lead vocalist from 2008 to 2011.

Lonestar has also charted 35 songs on the Billboard Hot Country Songs charts. Nine reached No. 1 on the Billboard country singles charts: "No News", "Come Cryin' to Me", "Amazed", "Smile", "What About Now", "Tell Her", "I'm Already There", "My Front Porch Looking In" and "Mr. Mom". "Amazed", the longest-lasting at eight weeks, was the No. 1 country song of 1999 according to the Billboard Year-End charts. It also became the first song to top the country singles charts and Billboard Hot 100 charts since Dolly Parton and Kenny Rogers' "Islands in the Stream" in 1983. All of the band's No. 1 hits except "No News" and "Come Cryin' to Me" have also been Top 40 hits on the Billboard Hot 100, as have "Not a Day Goes By" and "Let's Be Us Again", which respectively reached No. 3 and No. 4 on the country charts. Both "Amazed" and "I'm Already There" reached No. 2 on the Hot Adult Contemporary Tracks charts, and the former was a No. 21 on the UK Singles Chart. "Amazed", "I'm Already There", "My Front Porch Looking In" and "Mr. Mom" are all certified as gold singles by the RIAA.

== Studio albums ==
Title	Album details	Peak chart positions				Certifications (sales thresholds)
Title	Album details	US Country	US	CAN Country	UK	Certifications (sales thresholds)
Lonestar	Release date: October 10, 1995; Label: BNA	11	69	2	—	RIAA: Gold; MC: Gold
Crazy Nights	Release date: June 17, 1997; Label: BNA	16	166	28	—	RIAA: Gold; MC: Gold
Lonely Grill	Release date: June 1, 1999; Label: BNA	3	28	2	80	RIAA: 3× Platinum; BPI: Silver; MC: 3× Platinum
This Christmas Time	Release date: September 12, 2000; Label: BNA	11	95	—	—	
I'm Already There	Release date: June 19, 2001; Label: BNA	1	9	—	149	RIAA: Platinum; MC: Gold
Let's Be Us Again	Release date: May 25, 2004; Label: BNA	2	14	—	—	RIAA: Gold
Coming Home	Release date: September 13, 2005; Label: BNA	3	26	—	—	
Mountains	Release date: October 17, 2006; Label: BNA	10	37	—	—	
My Christmas List (Note: My Christmas List was exclusively sold at Cracker Barrel restaurants.)	Release date: November 6, 2007; Label: Cracker Barrel	—	—	—	—	
Party Heard Around the World	Release date: April 27, 2010; Label: Saguaro Road	20	103	—	—	
Life as We Know It	Release date: June 4, 2013; Label: 4 Star	33	148	—	—	
Never Enders	Release date: April 29, 2016; Label: Shanachie	48	—	—	—	
"—" denotes releases that did not chart

== Compilation albums ==
Title	Album details	Peak chart positions		Certifications (sales thresholds)
Title	Album details	US Country	US	Certifications (sales thresholds)
From There to Here: Greatest Hits	Release date: June 3, 2003; Label: BNA	1	7	RIAA: Platinum; MC: Gold
16 Biggest Hits	Release date: September 12, 2006; Label: BNA / Legacy	—	—	
Super Hits	Release date: September 25, 2007; Label: Sony BMG Special Markets	—	—	
Playlist: The Very Best of Lonestar	Release date: June 17, 2008; Label: BNA / Legacy	73	—	
Country: Lonestar	Release date: 2013; Label: Legacy	75	—	
Ten to 1	Release date: June 2, 2023; Label: Band Cave Records	—	—	
"—" denotes releases that did not chart

== Extended plays ==
Title	Album details
Lonestar Live	Release date: May 27, 1994; Label: self-released
Simply the Hits	Release date: April 19, 2011; Label: Saguaro Road
Iconic, Vol. 1	Release date: January 24, 2025; Label: Band Cave Records

== Singles ==
=== 1990s ===
Year	Single	Peak chart positions							Certifications (sales threshold)	Album
Year	Single	US Country	US	US AC	US Adult Pop	CAN Country	CAN	UK	Certifications (sales threshold)	Album
1995	"Tequila Talkin'"	8	— (Note: The physical single of "No News" was released as a double A-side with "Tequila Talkin'". The double-sided single did not enter the Hot 100, but peaked at number 22 on the Bubbling Under Hot 100.)	—	—	11	—	—		Lonestar
1996	"No News"	1	—	—	—	1	—	—		Lonestar
1996	"Runnin' Away with My Heart"	8	—	—	—	9	—	—		Lonestar
1996	"When Cowboys Didn't Dance"	45	—	—	—	18	—	—		Lonestar
1996	"Heartbroke Every Day"	18	—	—	—	22	—	—		Lonestar
1997	"Come Cryin' to Me"	1	—	—	—	3	—	—		Crazy Nights
1997	"You Walked In"	12	93	—	—	4	—	—		Crazy Nights
1998	"Say When"	13	—	—	—	23	—	—		Crazy Nights
1998	"Everything's Changed"	2	95	—	—	3	—	—		Crazy Nights
1999	"Saturday Night"	47	—	—	—	—	—	—		Lonely Grill
1999	"Amazed"	1	1	2	7	1	7	21	RIAA: Gold; BPI: Platinum; RMNZ: Platinum	Lonely Grill
1999	"Smile"	1	39	—	—	1	—	55		Lonely Grill
"—" denotes releases that did not chart

=== 2000s ===
Year	Single	Peak chart positions					Certifications (sales threshold)	Album
Year	Single	US Country	US	US AC	US Adult Pop	UK	Certifications (sales threshold)	Album
2000	"What About Now" (Note: "What About Now" also peaked at number 1 on the Canadian RPM Country Tracks chart.)	1	30	—	—	—		Lonely Grill
2000	"Tell Her"	1	39	—	—	—		Lonely Grill
2001	"I'm Already There"	1	24	2	29	81	RIAA: Gold	I'm Already There
2001	"With Me"	10	63	—	—	—		I'm Already There
2002	"Not a Day Goes By"	3	36	—	—	—		I'm Already There
2002	"Unusually Unusual"	12	66	—	—	—		I'm Already There
2003	"My Front Porch Looking In"	1	23	—	—	—	RIAA: Gold	From There to Here: Greatest Hits
2003	"Walking in Memphis"	8	61	—	—	—		From There to Here: Greatest Hits
2004	"Let's Be Us Again"	4	38	—	—	—		Let's Be Us Again
2004	"Mr. Mom"	1	33	—	—	—	RIAA: Gold	Let's Be Us Again
2005	"Class Reunion (That Used to Be Us)"	16	97	—	—	—		Let's Be Us Again
2005	"You're Like Comin' Home"	8	63	—	—	—		Coming Home
2006	"I'll Die Tryin'"	43	—	—	—	—		Coming Home
2006	"Mountains"	10	77	—	—	—		Mountains
2007	"Nothing to Prove"	51	—	—	—	—		Mountains
2008	"Let Me Love You"	50	—	—	—	—		Party Heard Around the World
"—" denotes releases that did not chart

=== 2010s ===
Year	Single	Peak chart positions		Album
Year	Single	US Country	US Country Airplay	Album
2010	"You're the Reason Why"	—		Party Heard Around the World
2012	"The Countdown"	52		Life as We Know It
2013	"Maybe Someday"	—	56	Life as We Know It
2013	"Party All Day"	—	—	Life as We Know It
2014	"Just the Rain"	—	—	Life as We Know It
2014	"Pretty Good Day"	—	—	Life as We Know It
2016	"Never Enders"	—	—	Never Enders
"—" denotes releases that did not chart

=== As a featured artist ===
Year	Single	Peak positions	Album
Year	Single	US Country	Album
2001	"America the Beautiful" (Note: Multi-artist collaboration featuring Trace Adkins, Billy Dean, Vince Gill, Carolyn Dawn Johnson, Toby Keith, Brenda Lee, Lonestar, Martina McBride, Jamie O'Neal, Kenny Rogers, and Keith Urban.)	58	Non-album single

== Other charted songs ==
The following songs charted on the Hot Country Songs charts from unsolicited airplay.

Year	Single	Peak positions	Album
Year	Single	US Country	Album
1997	"I'll Be Home for Christmas"	75	Country Cares for Kids
1999	"I'll Be Home for Christmas" (re-entry)	59	Country Cares for Kids
1999	"All My Love for Christmas"	61	Country Christmas Classics
2000	"Winter Wonderland"	72	This Christmas Time
2000	"Have Yourself a Merry Little Christmas"	71	This Christmas Time
2000	"Santa Claus Is Coming to Town"	67	This Christmas Time
2000	"The Little Drummer Boy"	46	This Christmas Time
2004	"Somebody's Someone"	53	Let's Be Us Again

== Music videos ==
Year	Video	Director
1996	"No News"	Deaton-Flanigen
1996	"When Cowboys Didn't Dance"	Deaton-Flanigen
1997	"You Walked In"	Steven Goldmann
1997	"Come Cryin' to Me"	Roger Pistole
1998	"Everything's Changed"	Steven T. Miller/R. Brad Murano
1999	"Amazed"	Trey Fanjoy
1999	"Smile"	Trey Fanjoy
2001	"I'm Already There"	Michael Salomon
2001	"America the Beautiful"	Marc Ball
2001	"With Me"	Keech Rainwater
2002	"Not a Day Goes By"	Lawrence Carroll
2003	"My Front Porch Looking In"	Trey Fanjoy
2003	"Walking in Memphis"	Milton Lage
2004	"Mr. Mom"	Roman White
2005	"You're Like Comin' Home"	Trey Fanjoy
2006	"Mountains"	Kristin Barlowe
2008	"Let Me Love You"	Glenn Sweitzer
2013	"Maybe Someday"	Lonestar
2014	"Just the Rain"	Jacob Moyer
2016	"Never Enders"	Jacob Moyer
