= Somebody's Someone =

Somebody's Someone may refer to:

- Somebody's Someone a 2006 album by Canadian singer Gil Grand
- "Somebody's Someone", a song by Lonestar on their 2004 album Let's Be Us Again
