= Simple as That =

Simple as That may refer to:

- "Simple as That", a 1983 song by Paul McCartney from Pipes of Peace
- "Simple as That", a 1999 song by Lonestar from Lonely Grill
