= Go Back =

Go Back may refer to:

== Music ==
- Go Back (album) or the title song, by Titãs, 1988
- "Go Back" (Chalee Tennison song), 2000
- "Go Back" (Jeanette song), 2000
- "Go Back", a song by Crabby Appleton, 1970
- "Go Back", a song by Leah Daniels, 2014

== Other uses ==
- Go Back (TV series), South Korean television series
- Go-Back, a fictional tribe of elves in the comic book series ElfQuest
- GoBack, a recovery utility for Microsoft Windows

== See also ==
- "Goobacks", a 2004 episode of the TV series South Park
- Get Back (disambiguation)
