= Crazy Nights (Lonestar album) =

Studio album by Lonestar
- Released: June 17, 1997
- Recorded: 1997
- Studio: The Soundshop Studio "A" and Sony/ATV Music Publishing Studio (Nashville, TN).
- Genre: Country; neotraditional country
- Length: 38:59
- Label: BNA
- Producer: Don Cook; Wally Wilson

Lonestar chronology
Lonestar (1995)	Crazy Nights (1997)	Lonely Grill (1999)

Singles from Crazy Hearts
- 1. "Come Cryin' to Me" Released: April 28, 1997; 2. "You Walked In" Released: August 26, 1997; 3. "Say When" Released: January 26, 1998; 4. "Everything's Changed" Released: June 29. 1998

Crazy Nights is the second studio album by American country music band Lonestar. Four singles were released from this album: "Come Cryin' to Me", "You Walked In", "Say When", and "Everything's Changed". "Come Cryin' to Me" reached number one on the Hot Country Songs charts. Also included is a cover of country rock band Pure Prairie League's single "Amie".

"Come Cryin' to Me" and "Say When" were both co-written by John Rich, who also sang lead on "John Doe on a John Deere" and "What Do We Do with the Rest of the Night". All the other tracks feature Richie McDonald on lead vocals. This was Lonestar's last album to have a neotraditional country sound before developing a more crossover-friendly country-pop sound. This was also Lonestar's last album as a five-piece as Rich left the band the following year. Rich's departure left McDonald as the group's sole lead vocalist because the record label said they wanted McDonald to be lead vocals only. After departing the group, he began a solo career on BNA, and eventually joined Big Kenny in the duo Big & Rich.

"Cheater's Road" was later recorded by Chalee Tennison on her 2003 album Parading in the Rain.

== Critical reception ==
Thom Owens of Allmusic rated the album three stars out of five, saying that the singles and the "Amie" cover were "solid", but criticizing the other tracks for being "bland".

== Track listing ==
No.	Title	Writer(s)	Length
1.	"Come Cryin' to Me"	John Rich; Mark D. Sanders; Wally Wilson	3:42
2.	"Everything's Changed"	Larry Boone; Richie McDonald; Paul Nelson	3:54
3.	"Cheater's Road"	Sharon Rice; Jason Sellers	3:50
4.	"A Week in Juarez"	Phil Barnhart; Sam Hogin; Jim McBride	2:47
5.	"John Doe on a John Deere"	Don Cook; Rich; Conley White	3:23
6.	"You Walked In"	Bryan Adams; Robert John "Mutt" Lange	4:30
7.	"Say When"	Boone; Nelson; Rich	3:23
8.	"Amie"	Craig Fuller	4:06
9.	"Crazy Nights"	Rich; Tom Shapiro; Chris Waters	3:20
10.	"Keys to My Heart"	McDonald; Kim Williams; Lonnie Wilson	3:00
11.	"What Do We Do With the Rest of the Night"	Rice; Rich; Wilson	3:01
Total length:			38:59

== Personnel ==
Taken from liner notes.

=== Lonestar ===
- Richie McDonald – lead vocals (1–4, 6–10), backing vocals (5, 11)
- Dean Sams – acoustic piano, backing vocals
- Michael Britt – electric lead guitar, acoustic guitar, backing vocals
- John Rich – bass guitar, backing vocals, lead vocals (5, 11)
- Keech Rainwater – drums, percussion

=== Additional musicians ===
- Dennis Burnside – acoustic piano, keyboards, Hammond B3 organ
- John Barlow Jarvis – acoustic piano, Hammond B3 organ
- Brent Mason – electric guitars, gut string guitar
- Mark Casstevens – acoustic guitar, mandolin
- Bruce Bouton – dobro, pedal steel guitar, lap steel guitar
- David Hungate – bass guitar
- Duncan Mullins – bass guitar
- Lonnie Wilson – drums, percussion
- Tom Roady – percussion
- Stuart Duncan – fiddle
- Larry Franklin – fiddle
- Rob Hajacos – fiddle, assorted hoedown tools
- John Wesley Ryles – backing vocals
- Harry Stinson – backing vocals
- Dennis Wilson – backing vocals

=== Production ===
- Don Cook – producer
- Wally Wilson – producer
- Mike Bradley – recording, mixing
- Mark Capps – recording assistant, mix assistant, additional recording
- Pat McMakin – additional recording
- John Dickson – additional assistant engineer
- Bart Pursley – additional assistant engineer
- Adam Shepard – additional assistant engineer
- Hank Williams – mastering at MasterMix (Nashville, Tennessee)
- Scott Johnson – production assistant
- Susan Eaddy – art direction
- Debendra Mahalanobis – design
- Peter Nash – photography

== Chart performance ==
Chart (1997)	Peak position
U.S. Billboard Top Country Albums	16
U.S. Billboard 200	166
Canadian RPM Country Albums	28

== Certifications ==
Region	Certification	Certified units/sales
Canada (Music Canada)	Gold	50,000^{^}
United States (RIAA)	Gold	500,000^{^}
^{^} Shipments figures based on certification alone.
