= What About Now =

What About Now may refer to:

- What About Now (album), 2013 album by Bon Jovi
- "What About Now" (Daughtry song), 2008 Daughtry song also covered by Westlife
- "What About Now" (Lonestar song), 2000 Lonestar song
- "What About Now" (Robbie Robertson song), 1991 Robbie Robertson song
