= Say When (Lonestar song) =

Single by Lonestar

from the album Crazy Nights
- B-side: "Amie"
- Released: January 26, 1998
- Recorded: 1997
- Genre: Country
- Length: 3:23
- Label: BNA
- Songwriters: Larry Boone; Paul Nelson; John Rich
- Producers: Don Cook; Wally Wilson

Lonestar singles chronology
"You Walked In" (1997)	"Say When" (1998)	"Everything's Changed" (1998)

"Say When" is a song recorded by the American country music group Lonestar, written by then band member John Rich along with Larry Boone and Paul Nelson. It was released in January 1998 as the third single from their second album Crazy Nights (1997). It peaked at number 13 on the U.S. Billboard Hot Country Singles & Tracks chart and at number 23 on the Canadian RPM Country Tracks chart.

== Critical reception ==
The song received a positive review in Billboard, saying "This sweet ballad looks sure to accelerate [the band's] momentum at country radio."

== Chart positions ==
"Say When" debuted at number 65 on the U.S. Billboard Hot Country Singles & Tracks for the week of January 31, 1998.

Chart (1998)	Peak position
Canada Country Singles (RPM)	23
US Hot Country Songs (Billboard)	13
