= Everything's Changed =

Single by Lonestar

from the album Crazy Nights and acoustic version on Lonely Grill
- Released: June 29, 1998
- Recorded: 1997
- Length: 3:54
- Label: BNA
- Songwriters: Larry Boone; Paul Nelson; Richie McDonald
- Producers: Don Cook; Wally Wilson

Lonestar singles chronology
"Say When" (1998)	"Everything's Changed" (1998)	"Saturday Night" (1999)

"Everything's Changed" is a song written by Richie McDonald, Larry Boone and Paul Nelson, and recorded by American country music band Lonestar. It was released in June 1998 as the fourth and final single from their 1997 album Crazy Nights. Their ninth chart single overall, it was also the last single to feature bass guitarist John Rich, who was fired from the band shortly before its release. The song peaked at number 2 on the Hot Country Singles & Tracks (now Hot Country Songs) chart, and number 95 on the Billboard Hot 100.

== Content ==
The song is a moderate midtempo ballad in which the narrator's lover has shown up after many years of being gone, and much has changed since they left their hometown; despite the changes in the town, however, the narrator still shows a love for her. The video for the song uses the single mix, which is mixed slightly differently from the album version.

== Music video ==
The music video for this song features Lonestar singing and performing the song behind a bunch of memories about the narrator's hometown. It was directed by Steven T. Miller and R. Brad Murano. Filmed shortly after Rich was fired from the band so he is not featured in the video, this is the last video to feature Richie McDonald and Dean Sams wearing cowboy hats, and the last video to feature Keech Rainwater with long hair. Michael Britt no longer has long hair, but he sported a haircut in this video.

== Other versions ==
Lonestar also performed an acoustic rendition of this song on their third studio album, 1999's Lonely Grill.

== Chart positions ==
"Everything's Changed" debuted at number 73 on the U.S. Billboard Hot Country Singles & Tracks for the week of July 4, 1998.

Chart (1998)	Peak position
Canada Country Singles (RPM)	3
US Billboard Hot 100	95
US Hot Country Songs (Billboard)	2

=== Year-end charts ===
Chart (1998)	Position
Canada Country Tracks (RPM)	42
US Country Songs (Billboard)	42
