= Come Cryin' to Me =

Single by Lonestar

from the album Crazy Nights
- B-side: "What Would It Take"
- Released: April 28, 1997
- Recorded: 1997
- Genre: Country pop
- Length: 3:41
- Label: BNA 64841
- Songwriters: Mark D. Sanders; Wally Wilson; John Rich
- Producers: Don Cook; Wally Wilson

Lonestar singles chronology
"Heartbroke Every Day" (1996)	"Come Cryin' to Me" (1997)	"You Walked In" (1997)

"Come Cryin' to Me" is a song recorded by American country music group Lonestar, released in April 1997 as the first single from their second studio album Crazy Nights. The song reached the top of the Billboard Hot Country Singles & Tracks chart. The song was the band's second Number One hit, as well as the first single of their career to be co-written by then-member John Rich, who later left the band in 1998 to pursue a solo career. It was written by Rich with Wally Wilson and Mark D. Sanders.

== Content ==
The song tells the story of a man comforting a woman who is in a bad relationship. The narrator exclaims that he will always be there for her as a crying shoulder when she needs someone to turn to.

== Music video ==
The music video was directed by Roger Pistole, using The Mavericks What a Crying Shame video, and features Raul Malo lip syncing Richie McDonald's vocals.

== Chart performance ==
This song debuted at No. 51 on the Hot Country Singles & Tracks chart dated May 10, 1997. It charted for 20 weeks on that chart, and reached No. 1 on the chart dated August 16, 1997, giving the band their second Number One single.

=== Charts ===
Chart (1997)	Peak position
Canada Country Singles (RPM)	3
US Hot Country Songs (Billboard)	1

=== Year-end charts ===
Chart (1997)	Position
Canada Country Tracks (RPM)	21
US Country Songs (Billboard)	11
