= This Christmas Time =

Studio album by Lonestar
- Released: September 12, 2000
- Studio: Emerald Entertainment (Nashville, Tennessee); Sound Kitchen and Studio Works Productions (Franklin, Tennessee).
- Genre: Country; Christmas
- Length: 44:04
- Label: BNA
- Producer: Dann Huff

Lonestar chronology
Lonely Grill (1999)	This Christmas Time (2000)	I'm Already There (2001)

Professional ratings
Review scores
Source	Rating
Allmusic	2/5 stars

This Christmas Time is the fourth studio album and first Christmas album by the American country music group Lonestar. Their first Christmas album, it was released in 2000 on BNA Records. Most of the tracks are renditions of traditional Christmas material, with three newly written tracks — the title track, "If Every Day Could Be Christmas", and "Reason for the Season".

== Track listing ==
No.	Title	Writer(s)	Length
1.	"Santa Claus Is Comin' to Town"	John Frederick Coots; Haven Gillespie	4:11
2.	"Please Come Home for Christmas"	Charles Brown; Gene Redd	2:48
3.	"Have Yourself a Merry Little Christmas"	Ralph Blane; Hugh Martin	4:22
4.	"If Every Day Could Be Christmas"	Anthony Little; Gary Baker; Frank J. Myers	4:34
5.	"The Little Drummer Boy"	Katherine Kennicott Davis; Harry Simeone; Henry Onorati	4:38
6.	"O Holy Night"	Adolphe Adam; John Sullivan Dwight	4:52
7.	"Reason for the Season"	Larry Boone; Paul Nelson; Richie McDonald	4:01
8.	"What Child Is This?"	William Chatterton Dix	3:14
9.	"Winter Wonderland"	Felix Bernard; Richard B. Smith	3:18
10.	"The Christmas Song (Chestnuts Roasting on an Open Fire)"	Mel Tormé; Robert Wells	4:07
11.	"This Christmas Time"	Marv Green; Dean Sams	3:51
Total length:			43:56

== Personnel ==
Lonestar

- Richie McDonald – lead vocals, keyboards, acoustic guitar
- Dean Sams – keyboards, acoustic piano, acoustic guitar, harmonica, backing vocals
- Michael Britt – acoustic guitar, electric guitars, backing vocals
- Keech Rainwater – drums, percussion

Additional Musicians

- Tim Akers – keyboards, acoustic piano
- Matt Rollings – keyboards, acoustic piano
- Dann Huff – electric guitars
- Larry Beaird – acoustic guitar, steel guitar
- Biff Watson – acoustic guitar, bouzouki
- Bruce Bouton – steel guitar
- Paul Franklin – steel guitar
- Mike Brignardello – bass guitar
- Paul Leim – drums
- Eric Darken – percussion
- Aubrey Haynie – fiddle
- Jonathan Yudkin – cello, fiddle, mandolin
- Kirk "Jelly Roll" Johnson – harmonica
- Robbie Cheuvront – backing vocals
- Glen M. Childress – backing vocals
- Lisa Cochran – backing vocals
- Vicki Hampton – backing vocals
- Gene Miller – backing vocals
- Russell Terrell – backing vocals

Production

- Dann Huff – producer
- Jeff Balding – recording, mixing
- Eric Bickel – recording assistant, mix assistant
- Jed Hackett – recording assistant, mix assistant
- Mark Hagen – recording assistant, mix assistant, additional recording
- Bart Pursley – additional recording
- Shawn Simpson – digital editing
- Doug Sax – mastering at The Mastering Lab (Hollywood, California)
- Robert Hadley – mastering assistant
- Mike "Frog" Griffith – production coordinator
- Norman Jean Roy – photography
- Michelle Vanderpool – hair, make-up
- Ann Waters – stylist

== Charts ==
=== Weekly charts ===
Chart (2000)	Peak position
US Billboard 200	95
US Christian Albums (Billboard)	3
US Top Country Albums (Billboard)	11
US Top Holiday Albums (Billboard)	6

=== Year-end charts ===
Chart (2001)	Position
US Top Country Albums (Billboard)	57
