= Chalee Tennison (album) =

Studio album by Chalee Tennison
- Released: June 8, 1999
- Studio: Ocean Way, Nashville
- Genre: Country
- Length: 38:42
- Label: Asylum Records
- Producer: Jerry Taylor

Chalee Tennison chronology
Chalee Tennison (1999)	This Woman's Heart (2000)

Chalee Tennison is the debut studio album by American country music artist Chalee Tennison, released on Asylum Records on June 8, 1999.

== Critical reception ==
People reviewed Chalie Tennison in its "Picks and Pans" and concluded with the following statement: "Bottom Line: Late-starter locks up a winner."

AllMusic's Maria Konicki Dinoia writes in her review that "Chalee Tennison reminds you of the reasons you started listening to country music in the first place."

== Track listing ==
- Track information and credits taken from the album's liner notes.

No.	Title	Writer(s)	Length
1.	"Someone Else's Turn to Cry"	Chalee Tennison; Jim Robinson	3:49
2.	"I Let Him Get Away With It"	Brett Beavers; W. L. Burnette	2:53
3.	"Handful of Water"	Austin Cunningham; Jason Sellers; Allison Mellon	2:48
4.	"Just Because She Lives There"	Billy Lawson; Dale Dodson	4:21
5.	"Leave It at That"	Stephony Smith; Cathy Majeski; Sunny Russ	3:25
6.	"A Stolen Car"	Bill LaBounty; Sam Hogin; Phil Barnhart	3:30
7.	"I Can Feel You Drifting"	Bat McGrath; Billy Kirsch	3:48
8.	"It Ain't So Easy"	John Bettis; Marv Green	4:00
9.	"There's a War in Me"	Gayl Carlberg; Jill Wilkin; Deborah Berwyn	3:27
10.	"Sometime"	Ed Bruce; Robin Lee Bruce	3:01
11.	"I'd Rather Miss You"	McGrath; Anthony Little; Michael L. Jones	3:40
Total length:			38:42

== Musicians ==
- Drums: Shannon Forrest & Brian Barnett
- Bass: Spady Brannan
- Acoustic Guitar: Michael Spriggs
- Electric Guitar: Kerry Marx & Brent Rowan
- Piano: Jimmy Nichols, Steve Conn & Billy Kirsch
- Hammond B-3: Steve Conn
- Steel Guitar & Lap Steel: Sonny Garrish
- Fiddle: Larry Franklin
- Strings: The Nashville String Machine
- Background Vocals: Kim Nash, Bill Nash & Chalee Tennison

== Production ==
- Produced by Jerry Taylor
- Production Coordination by Lauren Koch
- Recorded by Greg Droman, assisted by Joe Hayden & Aaron Swihart at Ocean Way Recording, Nashville, TN
- Mixed by Greg Droman, assisted by Tim Coyle at The Sound Kitchen, Franklin, TN
- The Nashville Strings arranged and conducted by Kristen Wilkinson
- Mastered by Denny Purcell at Georgetown Masters, Inc., Nashville, TN
- Art Direction by Susan Nadler
- Photography by Jim Shea
- Art Direction by Lee Wright & Michael Hagewood
- Design by Creative Access, Inc.
