= Leland Martin =

American country singer (born 1957)

- Born: February 20, 1957 (age 69)
- Origin: Success, Missouri, United States
- Genres: Country
- Occupation: Singer-songwriter
- Instruments: Vocals, guitar
- Years active: 1998–present
- Labels: Rival; IGO; Infinity Nashville; DMG

Leland Martin (born February 20, 1957, Success, Missouri) is an American country singer. Martin was one of nine children; his grandmother and father were both country singers. He held jobs as a truck driver, house painter, and in a sawmill before signing with Rival Records, who issued his debut album in 1998. Follow-up albums appeared in 2002, 2005, and 2008.

== Discography ==
=== Albums ===
Title	Album details
Home Is Where the Honky Tonk Is	Release date: November 24, 1998; Label: Rival
Simply Traditional	Release date: October 1, 2002; Label: IGO
Leland Martin	Release date: October 4, 2005; Label: Infinity Nashville
I'll Pick the Guitar, You Drive the Truck	Release date: June 24, 2008; Label: DMG

=== Singles ===
Year	Single	Peak positions	Album
Year	Single	US Country	Album
2002	"If I Had Long Legs (Like Alan Jackson)"	60	Simply Traditional
2003	"Hey Love, No Fair"	59	Simply Traditional
2003	"Stone Cold Fingers"	—	Simply Traditional
2003	"Simply Traditional"	—	Simply Traditional
2004	"Our American Heroes"	—	Leland Martin
2005	"Country as the Day Is Long"	—	Leland Martin
2006	"Same Ol' Song and Dance" (w/ Chalee Tennison)	—	Leland Martin
2006	"The Wayfaring Stranger"	—	Leland Martin
2008	"Royal Purple Peterbilt"	—	I'll Pick the Guitar, You Drive the Truck
"—" denotes releases that did not chart

=== Music videos ===
Year	Video
2002	"Flags on the Christmas Tree"
2003	"Stone Cold Fingers"
2004	"Our American Heroes"
2005	"Country as the Day Is Long"
2006	"Same Ol' Song and Dance" (w/ Chalee Tennison)
2011	"Workin Class"
