= You Walked In =

Single by Lonestar

from the album Crazy Nights
- B-side: "Keys to My Heart"
- Released: August 26, 1997
- Recorded: 1997
- Genre: Country pop
- Length: 3:40
- Label: BNA
- Songwriters: Bryan Adams; Robert John "Mutt" Lange
- Producers: Don Cook; Wally Wilson

Lonestar singles chronology
| "Come Cryin' to Me" (1997) | "You Walked In" (1997) | "Say When" (1998) |

"You Walked In" is a song recorded by American country music group Lonestar. It was written by Canadian pop-rock star Bryan Adams and producer Robert John "Mutt" Lange. The song was released in August 1997 as second single from Lonestar's second album Crazy Nights (1997).

The song peaked at No. 12 on the Billboard Hot Country Singles & Tracks chart in January 1998, and topped out at No. 4 on the Canadian RPM magazine Top Country Tracks chart.

== Content ==
The main protagonist in the song tells about how he tried to find true love with famous supermodels, singers and others through a variety of sources, such as magazines and pay-per-view events, but only found true love after meeting with the song's main female character, the one alluded to with the song's title line ("You walked in, with legs up to your neck ... "). Upon meeting this woman, the man's emotions are aroused, figuratively speaking about how his jaw "hits the ground" and "jumps out of his skin," and wanting more as he becomes excited by her smile and her walking style.

The lyrics include references to supermodels Cindy Crawford and Naomi Campbell, singer Madonna, and Diana, Princess of Wales.

=== Single and album edits ===
The single edit — which was released to radio for airplay — truncates the fiddle solo just before the final bridge ("I couldn't think of nothin' better to do ... ") is repeated, leading into the final choruses. There is also an earlier fade out during the second repeat of the final chorus, which is heard almost in its entirety in the album edit, but fades out only about a fourth of the way through in the single edit. The single edit is also mixed slightly differently, with more pronounced backing vocals from the band.

The song was released less than a week before Diana's death.

== Music video ==
The music video was directed by Steven Goldmann. It shows Lonestar performing the song at a studio with women goofing around. This was the band's first video to show Michael Britt without a cowboy hat and the last video to show him with long hair. This was also the band's last video to feature bass guitarist and co-lead vocalist John Rich, before he was ousted from the band in 1998.

== Chart positions ==
"You Walked In" debuted at number 70 on the U.S. Billboard Hot Country Songs chart for the week of August 30, 1997.

| Chart (1997–1998) | Peak position |
|---|---|
| Canada Country Singles (RPM) | 4 |
| US Billboard Hot 100 | 93 |
| US Hot Country Songs (Billboard) | 12 |
