= Parading in the Rain =

Studio album by Chalee Tennison
- Released: September 16, 2003
- Genre: Country
- Length: 40:47
- Label: DreamWorks
- Producer: James Stroud

Chalee Tennison chronology
This Woman's Heart (2000)	Parading in the Rain (2003)

Parading in the Rain is the third studio album by Chalee Tennison, released September 16, 2003.

== Critical reception ==
AllMusic's Johnny Loftus writes in his review that Chalee Tennison's third full-length album "is firmly, proudly contemporary country."

== Track listing ==
No.	Title	Writer(s)	Length
1.	"I Am Love"	Chalee Tennison; Phil O'Donnell	4:12
2.	"Parading in the Rain"	Bobby Pinson	3:44
3.	"Easy Lovin' You"	Philip White	4:15
4.	"Lonesome Road"	Bryant Simpson; Melissa Peirce; Ashley Gorley	2:57
5.	"The Mind of This Woman"	Dean Dillon; Chalee Tennison	3:06
6.	"Me and Mexico"	Liz Rose	3:41
7.	"I Am Pretty"	Buffy Lawson; Eric Pittarelli	4:00
8.	"Cheater's Road"	Sharon Rice; Jason Sellers	3:27
9.	"More to This Than That"	Gary Burr; Carolyn Dawn Johnson	3:44
10.	"Believe"	Chalee Tennison	3:37
11.	"Peace"	Leslie Satcher	4:04
Total length:			40:47

- Track information and credits taken from the album's liner notes.
