= Get Back (disambiguation) =

"Get Back" is a song by the Beatles.

Get Back may also refer to:

== Film and television ==
- Get Back (film), a 1991 Paul McCartney concert movie
- Get Back (TV series), a 1992 British sitcom
- The Beatles: Get Back, a 2021 documentary series

== Music ==
=== Albums ===
- Get Back (Beatles album), a music and film project by the Beatles, resulting in the album Let It Be and the film of the same title
- Get Back (Basics album), 2003
- Get Back (Pink Mountaintops album), 2014

=== Songs ===
- "Get Back" (Demi Lovato song), 2008
- "Get Back" (Ludacris song), 2004
- "Get Back" (Zebrahead song), 1998
- "Get Back", a song by Britney Spears from Blackout
- "Get Back", a song by Veruca Salt from American Thighs
- "Get Back (ASAP)", a 2011 song by Alexandra Stan
- "Get Back", a song by Pop Smoke from his mixtape Meet the Woo 2
- "Get Back", a song by Margaret Glaspy from the 2023 album Echo the Diamond

== See also ==
- Got Back, a 2022 North American concert tour by Paul McCartney
- Get Back – Together, a 1997 album by the Quarrymen
- Let It Be (1970 film), a documentary about the Beatles whose original planned title was Get Back
- Go Back (disambiguation)
