= This Woman's Heart =

Studio album by Chalee Tennison
- Released: October 10, 2000
- Genre: Country
- Length: 43:36
- Label: Asylum Records
- Producer: Jerry Taylor

Chalee Tennison chronology
Chalee Tennison (1999)	This Woman's Heart (2000)	Parading in the Rain (2003)

This Woman's Heart is the second studio album by American country music artist Chalee Tennison, released October 10, 2000 on Asylum Records.

== Critical reception ==
People Magazine's website reviewed This Woman's Heart in its "Picks and Pans" and concluded with the following statement. "Bottom Line: A follow-up album with heart"

AllMusic's Maria Konicki Dinoia writes in her review that Chalee Tennison's "voice is so appealing and original and it makes every one of her songs worth listening to. She brings a welcome and refreshing sound to country music fans."

- See original reviews for full article.

== Track listing ==
No.	Title	Writer(s)	Length
1.	"Yes I Was"	Rick Carnes; Chalee Tennison	3:13
2.	"Somebody Save Me"	Noah Gordon; Tennison; Wade Kirby	3:53
3.	"I'm Healing"	Dean Dillon; Tennison	3:25
4.	"Makin' Up with You"	Phil O'Donnell; Jeremy Campbell	4:31
5.	"This Woman's Heart"	Jim Robinson; Tennison	4:01
6.	"Go Back"	Donny Hackett; Campbell	3:55
7.	"Break It Even"	Dillon; Tennison	3:09
8.	"We Don't Have to Pray"	Billy Lawson; Dale Dodson; Tennison	4:05
9.	"What I Tell Myself"	Gordon; Kendell Marvel	3:30
10.	"You Can't Say That"	Tennison; O'Donnell; Campbell	3:05
11.	"I Ain't"	Craig Fuller; Monty Criswell	3:06
12.	"Under Your Skin"	Adrienne Follesé; Keith Follesé; Stephanie Bentley	3:43
Total length:			43:36

- Track information and credits taken from the album's liner notes.
