= Never Enders =

Studio album by Lonestar
- Released: April 29, 2016
- Recorded: 2014–2016
- Studios: Blackbird, Nashville; Ocean Way, Nashville; The Mix Mill, Nashville
- Genres: Country; pop; rock
- Length: 35:59
- Label: Shanachie
- Producer: Dean Sams

Lonestar chronology
Life as We Know It (2013)	Never Enders (2016)

Singles from Never Enders
- 1. "Never Enders" Released: March 17, 2016

Never Enders is the twelfth studio album by American country music band Lonestar, produced single-handedly by band member Dean Sams. It was released on April 29, 2016 via Shanachie Records. The album's lead single and title track was delivered to country radio on March 17, 2016. This is the final Lonestar album to feature lead singer Richie McDonald before he departed the band a second time in March 2021.

== Track listing ==
Never Enders track listing
No.	Title	Writer(s)	Length
1.	"Never Enders"	Marv Green; Richie McDonald; Dean Sams	3:26
2.	"I Know It Was You"	McDonald; Frank J. Myers; Sams	3:12
3.	"My Own Hometown"	Marty Dodson; McDonald; Sams	3:41
4.	"Twice"	Eric Arjes; Jeremy Bussey; Jeff Pardo	3:21
5.	"This Time"	Bussey; McDonald	3:59
6.	"I've Been Wrong Before"	Susan Ruth; Sams; Adam Wood	3:34
7.	"I Want a Love"	Michael Britt; McDonald; Keech Rainwater; Sams	3:54
8.	"Us"	McDonald; Myers; Sams	3:32
9.	"Here We Go Again"	Ruth; Sams; Wood	3:36
10.	"Boomerang"	Bussey; McDonald; Sams	3:44
Total length:			35:59

== Personnel ==
Lonestar

- Richie McDonald – lead vocals
- Dean Sams – acoustic piano, Fender Rhodes, Hammond B3 organ, acoustic guitar, backing vocals
- Michael Britt – electric guitars
- Keech Rainwater – drums

Additional musicians

- Jimmy Nichols – Hammond B3 organ, strings
- Kenny Greenberg – electric guitars
- Derek Weils – electric guitars
- Ilya Toshinsky – acoustic guitar
- Biff Watson – acoustic guitar
- Paul Franklin – steel guitar
- Mark Hill – bass guitar
- Eric Darken – percussion
- Perry Coleman – backing vocals

Production

- Dean Sams – producer, digital editing
- Brady Barnett – digital editing
- Mills Logan – mixing, tracking engineer
- Josh Ditty – second engineer
- Ernesto Olvera – second engineer
- Ken Love – mastering at Five Points Mastering (Nashville, Tennessee)
- Jon-Paul Bruno – photography
- Glenn Sweltzer – art direction, design

== Charts ==
Chart performance of Never Enders
Chart (2016)	Peak position
US Top Country Albums (Billboard)	48
