= Go Back (Chalee Tennison song) =

2000 song performed by Chalee Tennison

Single by Chalee Tennison

from the album This Woman's Heart
- Released: November 18, 2000
- Genre: Country
- Length: 3:59
- Label: Asylum
- Songwriter(s): Jeremy Campbell, Donny Hackett
- Producer(s): Jerry Taylor

Chalee Tennison singles chronology
"Makin' Up with You" (2000)	"Go Back" (2000)	"Lonesome Road" (2002)

"Go Back" is a song recorded by American country music artist Chalee Tennison. It was released in November 2000 as the first single from the album This Woman's Heart. The song reached No. 36 on the Billboard Hot Country Singles Tracks chart. The song was written by Jeremy Campbell and Donny Hackett.

== Content ==
The song is a ballad where a trucker is being told on three separate occasions to "go back" to someone important. In the last verse, he is in an accident while on the way to visit his daughter, and has a near-death experience where angels to tell him "go back".

== Critical reception ==
A review in Billboard praised the song's "affecting lyric", Tennison's singing voice, and the "pretty melody".

== Chart performance ==
Chart (2000)	Peak position
US Hot Country Songs (Billboard)	36
