= Mountains (Lonestar album) =

Studio album by Lonestar
- Released: October 17, 2006
- Studios: Starstruck Studios (Nashville, Tennessee)
- Genre: Country
- Length: 42:31
- Label: BNA
- Producer: Mark Bright

Lonestar chronology
Coming Home (2005)	Mountains (2006)	Party Heard Around the World (2010)

Singles from Mountains
- 1. "Mountains" Released: June 26, 2006; 2. "Nothing to Prove" Released: February 5, 2007

Professional ratings
Review scores
Source	Rating
About.com	5/5 stars
AllMusic	2.5/5 stars
Billboard	(favorable)

Mountains is the eighth studio album by American country music group Lonestar. It was the band's last album for BNA Records, it produced two singles on the Hot Country Songs charts: "Mountains" at No. 10 and "Nothing to Prove" at No. 51. After the single released, the band was dropped from BNA. This was also the last studio album from Lonestar to feature Richie McDonald, who quit the band in 2007 to pursue a solo career, before rejoining in 2011.

Stephen Thomas Erlewine of AllMusic gave the album two-and-a-half stars out of five, saying that "the group takes fewer risks than ever" on it.

== Track listing ==
No.	Title	Writer(s)	Length
1.	"Mountains"	Larry Boone; Richie McDonald; Paul Nelson	3:56
2.	"Nothing to Prove"	Jim Collins; Wendell Mobley	3:56
3.	"Long Lost Smile"	Marc Beeson; Neil Thrasher	3:55
4.	"Thought It Was You"	Collins; Craig Wiseman	3:42
5.	"Hey God"	Tommy Lee James; McDonald	3:46
6.	"I Wanna Do It for You"	Regie Hamm; Glen Mitchell; Dean Sams	4:20
7.	"Cowboy Girl"	Brett James; Bill Luther	3:32
8.	"What She Had To"	John Edwards; Garrett Parris	3:49
9.	"One of those Nights"	Jason Sellers; Tom Shapiro	4:13
10.	"Careful Where You Kiss Me"	Jeff Bates; Mobley; Thrasher	3:20
11.	"Always in the Band"	Ron Harbin; McDonald; Jerry Vandiver	4:02
Total length:			42:31

Target exclusive bonus tracks
No.	Title	Producer(s)	Length
12.	"Don't Forget Me"	Mark Bright	4:12
13.	"I Don't Know How to Do That"	Bright; Justin Niebank	4:09
14.	"She Can Make It Rain"	Bright; Dann Huff	4:32
Total length:			55:24

=== Lonestar ===
- Richie McDonald – lead vocals
- Dean Sams – keyboards, acoustic piano, backing vocals
- Michael Britt – acoustic guitar, electric guitars, backing vocals
- Keech Rainwater – drums, percussion, backing vocals

=== Additional musicians ===
- Jimmy Nichols – keyboards
- Tom Bukovac – electric guitars
- B. James Lowry – acoustic guitar
- Bryan Sutton – acoustic guitar
- Mike Johnson – steel guitar
- Gary Morse – steel guitar
- Jimmie Lee Sloas – bass guitar
- Chris McHugh – drums
- Eric Darken – percussion
- Kirk "Jelly Roll" Johnson – harmonica
- Jonathan Yudkin – strings, string arrangements
- Wes Hightower – backing vocals

=== Production ===
- Mark Bright – producer
- Derek Bason – engineer, mixing
- J.R. Rodriguez – engineer
- Chris Ashburn – assistant engineer, mix assistant
- Nathan Dickinson – assistant engineer
- Hank Williams – mastering at MasterMix (Nashville, Tennessee)
- Mike "Frog" Griffith – production coordinator
- Judy Forde Blair – creative producer, liner notes
- Astrid Herbold May – art direction, design
- Margaret Malandruccolo – photography
- Angela Cay Hall – grooming
- Stephanie Sparkman – stylist
- Trish Townsend – stylist

== Charts ==
Chart (2006)	Peak position
US Billboard 200	37
US Top Country Albums (Billboard)	10
