= Let's Be Us Again (song) =

Single by Lonestar

from the album Let's Be Us Again
- Released: March 1, 2004
- Genre: Country pop
- Length: 3:53
- Label: BNA
- Songwriters: Richie McDonald; Maribeth Derry; Tommy Lee James
- Producer: Dann Huff

Lonestar singles chronology
"Walking in Memphis" (2003)	"Let's Be Us Again" (2004)	"Mr. Mom" (2004)

"Let's Be Us Again" is a song recorded by American country music group Lonestar. The song reached the Top 5 on the Billboard Hot Country Singles & Tracks (now Hot Country Songs) charts. It was released in March 2004 as the first single and title track from their album of the same name. Then-lead singer Richie McDonald co-wrote the song with Maribeth Derry and Tommy Lee James.

== Content ==
The song is a mid-tempo mostly accompanied by guitar. Its narrator is a man who has done something wrong in his relationship. He says hurtful things, and makes his partner cry, and then he realized how close he comes to losing them, and asks them if he can make things normal again, and if they'll forgive him.

== Chart performance ==
The song debuted at number 43 on the Hot Country Singles & Tracks chart dated March 6, 2004. It charted for 21 weeks on that chart, and peaked at number 4 on the chart dated June 26, 2004, in addition to peaking at number 38 on the Billboard Hot 100.

Chart (2004)	Peak position
Canada Country (Radio & Records)	2
US Hot Country Songs (Billboard)	4
US Billboard Hot 100	38

=== Year-end charts ===
Chart (2004)	Position
US Country Songs (Billboard)	23
