= Smile (Lonestar song) =

1999 single by Lonestar

Single by Lonestar

from the album Lonely Grill
- B-side: "Amazed"
- Released: October 25, 1999
- Length: 3:33
- Label: BNA
- Songwriters: Keith Follesé; Chris Lindsey
- Producer: Dann Huff

Lonestar singles chronology
"Amazed" (1999)	"Smile" (1999)	"What About Now" (2000)

"Smile" is a song recorded by American country music band Lonestar. Written by Keith Follesé and Chris Lindsey, it was released in October 1999 as the third single from their third album Lonely Grill. The song topped the US Billboard Hot Country Singles & Tracks chart for a week.

== Music video ==
The music video was directed by Trey Fanjoy, and premiered on CMT on October 30, 1999, during CMT's "Delivery Room". A portion of their previous single "Amazed" was played at the beginning of the video.

== Charts ==
Chart (1999–2000)	Peak position
Canada Country Singles (RPM)	1
Scottish Singles Sales (Official Charts)	50
UK Singles (Official Charts)	55
UK Indie (Official Charts)	12
US Billboard Hot 100	39
US Hot Country Songs (Billboard)	1

=== Year-end charts ===
Chart (2000)	Position
US Hot Country Singles & Tracks (Billboard)	20

== Release history ==
Region	Date	Format(s)	Label(s)	Ref.
United States	October 25, 1999	Country radio	BNA	
United Kingdom	September 25, 2000	CD; cassette	RCA; BMG	
