= Life as We Know It (Lonestar album) =

Studio album by Lonestar
- Released: June 4, 2013
- Recorded: 2012–2013
- Studio: Blackbird, Nashville; Ocean Way, Nashville; Studio Works, Franklin
- Genre: Country; pop; rock
- Length: 42:58
- Label: 4 Star
- Producer: Lonestar

Lonestar chronology
Party Heard Around the World (2010)	Life as We Know It (2013)	Never Enders (2016)

Singles from Life as We Know It
- 1. "The Countdown" Released: July 17, 2012; 2. "Maybe Someday" Released: January 22, 2013; 3. "Party All Day" Released: August 2, 2013; 4. "Just the Rain" Released: April 14, 2014; 5. "Pretty Good Day" Released: November 7, 2014

Life as We Know It is the eleventh studio album by American country music band Lonestar. It was released on June 4, 2013 via their own 4 Star Records label. It is Lonestar's first new studio album since the return of original lead vocalist Richie McDonald in 2011.

== Critical reception ==
Matt Bjorke of Roughstock gave the album a positive review. He praised the album's production and the band's choice of songs, calling them "top-notch". He also called the album "one that gives the band's fans an exciting look into the new chapter in the band's career with their own label (4Star Records) and renewed energy towards crafting another 20 years in the business."

== Track listing ==
No.	Title	Writer(s)	Length
1.	"The Countdown"	Jaren Johnston; Ryder Lee; Manny Medina	3:35
2.	"Maybe Someday"	Richie McDonald; Billy Montana; Frank J. Myers; Dean Sams	4:14
3.	"How Can She Be Everywhere"	McDonald; Tim Nichols; Sams	3:19
4.	"Pretty Good Day"	Marv Green; Tommy Lee James; McDonald	3:06
5.	"With My Eyes Open"	Cory Batten; Don Mescall	3:26
6.	"Party All Day"	Michael Britt; McDonald; Myers; Jerry Williams	3:28
7.	"Life as We Know It"	Britt; Nichols; Sams	3:25
8.	"If It Wasn't for You"	Green; McDonald; Sams	3:35
9.	"I Miss When"	Jim Beavers; Jonathan Singleton	3:32
10.	"I Did It for the Girl"	Marty Dodson; Clay Mills; Sams	3:11
11.	"Just the Rain"	Jeremy Bussey; McDonald	4:07
12.	"Oh Yeah"	Britt; Bussey; McDonald; Sams	4:00
Total length:			42:58

== Personnel ==
Lonestar

- Richie McDonald – lead vocals
- Dean Sams – acoustic piano, Wurlitzer electric piano, Hammond B3 organ, acoustic guitars, backing vocals
- Michael Britt – electric guitars
- Keech Rainwater – drums

Additional musicians

- Troy Lancaster – electric guitars
- Adam Shoenfeld – electric guitars
- Pat McGrath – acoustic guitars
- Russ Pahl – steel guitar
- Tony Lucido – bass guitar
- Eric Darken – percussion
- Jonathan Yudkin – strings
- Perry Coleman – backing vocals

Production

- Rich Blaser – executive producer
- Lonestar – producers
- Dean Sams – additional production, vocal engineer, digital editing
- Mills Logan – tracking engineer, mixing
- Alex Jarvis – assistant engineer
- Allen Parker – assistant engineer
- Lowell Reynolds – assistant engineer
- Brien Sagar – assistant engineer
- Brady Barnett – digital editing
- Glenn Sweitzer – art direction, design
- Russ Harrington – photography
- John Scarpati – photography

== Chart performance ==
Chart (2013)	Peak position
US Billboard 200	148
US Top Country Albums (Billboard)	33
US Independent Albums (Billboard)	22
