= Party Heard Around the World =

Studio album by Lonestar
- Released: April 27, 2010
- Recorded: 2008–2010
- Studios: Sound Kitchen and Studio Works Productions (Franklin, Tennessee); The Tracking Room and Blackbird Studio (Nashville, Tennessee)
- Genres: Country; pop; rock
- Length: 36:31
- Label: Saguaro Road
- Producer: Lonestar

Lonestar chronology
Mountains (2006)	Party Heard Around the World (2010)	Life as We Know It (2013)

Singles from Party Heard Around the World
- 1. "Let Me Love You" Released: 2008; 2. "You're the Reason Why" Released: March 22, 2010

Party Heard Around the World is the tenth studio album by American country music group Lonestar, released on April 27, 2010. It is the band's first studio album of original material since 2006's Mountains. It debuted at No. 20 on the Billboard Country Albums chart and No. 100 on the Billboard 200, selling 5,000 copies in its first week. It is the second and final album to feature Cody Collins on lead vocals since Richie McDonald left in 2007 to pursue a solo career then returned the following year.

== Background ==
Party Heard Around the World is the second of two studio albums from the band to feature lead vocalist Cody Collins, who joined Lonestar in 2007, after the departure of lead singer Richie McDonald; the group previously recorded the Christmas album My Christmas List with Collins, which was exclusively sold for a limited time at Cracker Barrel restaurants. Party Heard Around the World is also the band's only release for Saguaro Road Records.

On March 31, Lonestar gave an exclusive concert for QVC where they performed some of their hit songs, such as "Amazed" and "I'm Already There", and some selections from Party Heard Around the World.

Lonestar was featured as the first "house band" on The Price Is Right on June 17, 2010. In their appearance, they performed The Price Is Right theme song throughout the show, and "Party Heard Around the World" featured in one of the two showcases.

== Singles ==
The first single from the album, "Let Me Love You" was released in early 2008, where it debuted at #60 on the Billboard Charts. In an interview with americajr.com, when asked about the story behind the song, Collins responded by saying "Well, I didn't write the song, but it's basically a love song, [...] It's a guy asking a girl to open up your heart to me. Basically, let me in. A lot of girls don't want to do that these days. They think we're all douche bags. It's nice for a girl to open up to somebody and let somebody in."

"You're The Reason Why" was released as the second single in March 2010.

== Critical reception ==
Blake Boldt of Engine 145 gave the album two-and-a-half stars out of five, calling it "ultimately forgettable fluff" and criticizing Collins' "silky smooth voice [that] barely makes a ripple."

Michael McCall with the Associated Press criticized the album by saying "the revamped country band tries to forge a future by shifting away from its past. No longer portraying themselves as content fathers relaxing on the front porch, Lonestar now prefers combing clubs and beachfronts for love and good times."

== Track listing ==
No.	Title	Writer(s)	Length
1.	"Beat (I Can Feel Your Heart)"	Michael Britt; Cody Collins; Keech Rainwater; Dean Sams	3:13
2.	"Live, Laugh and Love"	Collins; Gary Harrison; Sams	4:01
3.	"She Wants What She Wants"	Britt; Rainwater; Sams	3:23
4.	"You're the Reason Why"	Britt; Collins; Sams	3:26
5.	"Y.O.U."	Britt; Collins; Rainwater; Sams	3:34
6.	"Making Memories"	Collins; Greg Crowe; Sams	4:44
7.	"The Future"	Brett James; Matt Scannell	3:39
8.	"Goodbye Is Goodbye"	Collins; Crowe; Sams	3:19
9.	"Let Me Love You"	Dennis Matkosky; Craig Wiseman	3:48
10.	"Party Heard Around the World"	Britt; Chris Cavanaugh; Sams	3:24
Total length:			36:31

Wal-Mart bonus tracks
No.	Title	Writer(s)	Length
11.	"Tough"	Brent Anderson; Brent Baxter; Joel Shewmake	4:08
12.	"Mean as You"	James; Kelley Lovelace; Tim Nichols	3:35

== Personnel ==
From Party Heard Around the World liner notes.

Lonestar

- Cody Collins – lead vocals
- Dean Sams – piano, keyboards, Hammond B3 organ, backing vocals
- Michael Britt – electric guitars, mandolin
- Keech Rainwater – drums

Additional musicians

- Troy Lancaster – electric guitars
- Billy Panda – acoustic guitar
- Biff Watson – acoustic guitar
- Larry Franklin – fiddle, mandolin
- Mark Hill – bass guitar
- Eric Darken – percussion
- Perry Coleman – backing vocals
- Wes Hightower – backing vocals

Production

- Mike Jason – executive producer
- Lonestar – producers
- Dean Sams – additional production, digital editing
- Jeff Balding – engineer
- Mills Logan – engineer
- Justin Niebank – engineer
- Drew Bollman – assistant engineer
- Lowell Reynolds – assistant engineer
- Brien Sager – assistant engineer
- Jed Hackett – digital editing
- Hank Williams – mastering at MasterMix (Nashville, Tennessee)
- Bas Hartong – A&R
- Kim Sams – production assistant
- Janine Morris – project manager
- Jeff Crump – art direction
- Latocki Team Creative – art direction, design
- Andy Baggett – design
- Joseph Anthony Baker – photography
- Corey Wagner and Sanctuary Music Group – management
- Olivia Kim – editorial research

== Charts ==
Chart (2010)	Peak position
US Billboard 200	103
US Top Country Albums (Billboard)	20
