= Mountains (Lonestar song) =

Single by Lonestar

from the album Mountains
- Released: June 26, 2006
- Genre: Country
- Length: 3:56
- Label: BNA
- Songwriters: Richie McDonald; Larry Boone; Paul Nelson
- Producer: Mark Bright

Lonestar singles chronology
"I'll Die Tryin'" (2006)	"Mountains" (2006)	"Nothing to Prove" (2007)

"Mountains" is a song written by Richie McDonald, Larry Boone and Paul Nelson, and recorded by American country music band Lonestar. It was released on June 26, 2006, as the lead single from their seventh studio album of the same name. The song is the band's final Top Ten hit, reaching a peak of number 10 on the U.S. country singles charts in late 2006.

== Content ==
"Mountains" is a mid-tempo in which the narrator cites two examples of people who overcome difficult situations in their lives. The first is a single mother who has to work two jobs to put her kids through school, and the second is an armed service veteran who sustained an injury in combat that required him to have a leg amputated, but runs a marathon wearing a prosthesis despite the pain he feels. In both situations, the narrator uses mountains as a metaphor for the struggles each person faces.

== Music video ==
The music video was directed by Kristin Barlowe and premiered on August 24, 2006. It was filmed partially west of Denver, Colorado (where the band played).

== Chart performance ==
Chart (2006)	Peak position
Canada Country (Billboard)	24
US Hot Country Songs (Billboard)	10
US Billboard Hot 100	77
US Billboard Pop 100	100

=== Year-end charts ===
Chart (2006)	Position
US Country Songs (Billboard)	59
