= Class Reunion (That Used to Be Us) =

Single by Lonestar

from the album Let's Be Us Again
- Released: January 17, 2005
- Genre: Country
- Length: 4:32 (album version); 3:58 (radio edit)
- Label: BNA
- Songwriters: Richie McDonald; Frank J. Myers; Don Pfrimmer
- Producer: Dann Huff

Lonestar singles chronology
"Mr. Mom" (2004)	"Class Reunion (That Used to Be Us)" (2005)	"You're Like Comin' Home" (2005)

"Class Reunion (That Used to Be Us)" is a song recorded by American country music band Lonestar. It was released in January 2005 as the third single from their album Let's Be Us Again. Lead singer Richie McDonald co-wrote the song with Frank J. Myers and Don Pfrimmer.

== Content ==
The song's narrator returns to his hometown for the class of '83 reunion, arriving with the "ragtop down" in search of familiar faces and memories. However, he quickly realizes that time has changed everyone: former football players are now "twice their size," cheerleaders are "hiding the grey in their hair," and the once-recognizable faces are now unfamiliar. Even the homecoming queen, who was once the girl of his dreams, doesn't remember his name.

The recurring chorus, "That used to be us," underscores a sense of longing and reflection. It speaks to the universal experience of looking back on youth with a mix of fondness and melancholy, acknowledging how people and relationships evolve over time.

== Chart performance ==
"Class Reunion (That Used to Be Us)" debuted at number 48 on the U.S. Billboard Hot Country Songs chart for the week of January 22, 2005.

Chart (2005)	Peak position
Canada Country (Radio & Records)	28
US Hot Country Songs (Billboard)	16
US Billboard Hot 100	97
