= Lonely Grill =

Studio album by Lonestar
- Released: June 1, 1999
- Studio: Masterfonics and Iliad (Nashville); Sound Kitchen (Franklin, Tenn.)
- Genre: Country; pop; rock
- Length: 44:53
- Label: BNA
- Producer: Dann Huff; Sam Ramage; Bob Wright

Lonestar chronology
Crazy Nights (1997)	Lonely Grill (1999)	This Christmas Time (2000)

Singles from Lonely Grill
- 1. "Saturday Night" Released: January 18, 1999; 2. "Amazed" Released: March 22, 1999; 3. "Smile" Released: October 25, 1999; 4. "What About Now" Released: April 17, 2000; 5. "Tell Her" Released: September 18, 2000

Lonely Grill is the third studio album by American country music group Lonestar, released in the United States on June 1, 1999, by BNA Records. It reached number 28 on the Billboard 200 chart, and number three on the Top Country Albums chart. With sales of three million copies in the United States, it has been certified 3× Platinum by the RIAA. This was Lonestar's first studio album to have a crossover-friendly country-pop sound, which was a departure from their earlier neotraditional country sound. It is also their first studio album to be recorded as a four-piece as bassist and second lead vocalist John Rich left the band the previous year in 1998. Instead of replacing him with a new member, the band hired several session bassists to play the album's bass parts.

== Content ==
The singles released from Lonely Grill were, in order of release, "Saturday Night", "Amazed", "Smile", "What About Now", and "Tell Her". While "Saturday Night" peaked at number 47 on the Billboard Hot Country Songs charts, all other singles from this album reached number one on that same chart as well as reaching the Top 40 on the Billboard Hot 100 chart. "Amazed" was also the group's biggest crossover hit, also peaking at number 1 on the Billboard Hot 100 and number 2 on the Hot Adult Contemporary Tracks charts. Also included on this album is an acoustic rendition of the group's late-1998 hit "Everything's Changed" (from their Crazy Nights album). Dann Huff produced all but the last track, which was produced by Sam Ramage and Bob Wright.

This was Lonestar's first album after the departure of bass guitarist John Rich, who recorded a solo album for BNA that same year before pairing up with Big Kenny in the duo Big & Rich. Richie McDonald became the band's sole lead vocalist after Rich's departure, and studio bass guitarists are used in Rich's place.

== Critical reception ==
Professional ratings
Review scores
Source	Rating
AllMusic	3/5 stars

Giving it three stars out of five, Stephen Thomas Erlewine of AllMusic wrote that Lonestar "take[s] a middle ground, moving back toward hardcore country while retaining elements of the pop sheen of Crazy Nights. The results aren't always successful, but overall, the album is stronger than its immediate predecessor."

== Track listing ==
All tracks produced by Dann Huff except where noted.

North American edition
No.	Title	Writer(s)	Producer(s)	Length
1.	"Saturday Night"	Chuck Cannon; Jimmy Alan Stewart		4:03
2.	"Simple as That"	Gary Baker; Richie McDonald; Frank J. Myers		3:17
3.	"Amazed"	Marv Green; Chris Lindsey; Aimee Mayo		4:00
4.	"What About Now"	Aaron Barker; Ron Harbin; Anthony L. Smith		3:30
5.	"Tell Her"	Kwesi B.; Craig Wiseman		3:27
6.	"Don't Let's Talk About Lisa"	Don Henry; Benmont Tench		3:14
7.	"I've Gotta Find You"	Marty Dodson; Harbin; McDonald		3:48
8.	"You Don't Know What Love Is"	Steve Bogard; Green		3:14
9.	"All the Way"	Stephony Smith; Shelly Sterling		3:34
10.	"Smile"	Keith Follesé; Lindsey		3:33
11.	"Lonely Grill"	Bob DiPiero; Tony Mullins		4:31
12.	"Everything's Changed" (acoustic version)	Larry Boone; McDonald; Paul Nelson	Sam Ramage; Bob Wright	4:46
Total length:				44:57

2000 European limited edition reissue
No.	Title	Writer(s)	Producer(s)	Length
1.	"Saturday Night"	Cannon; Stewart		4:03
2.	"Simple as That"	Baker; McDonald; Myers		3:17
3.	"Amazed" (Huff mix)	Green; Lindsey; Mayo		4:00
4.	"What About Now"	Barker; Harbin; A. L. Smith		3:30
5.	"Tell Her"	Kwesi B.; Wiseman		3:27
6.	"Don't Let's Talk About Lisa"	Henry; Tench		3:14
7.	"I've Gotta Find You"	Dodson; Harbin; McDonald		3:48
8.	"You Don't Know What Love Is"	Bogard; Green		3:14
9.	"All the Way"	S. Smith; Sterling		3:34
10.	"Smile" (Captain mix)	Follesé; Lindsey	Dann Huff; Nick Stewart; Brian Tankersley	3:51
11.	"Lonely Grill"	DiPiero; Mullins		4:31
12.	"Everything's Changed" (acoustic version)	Boone; McDonald; Nelson	Ramage; Wright	4:46
13.	"Amazed" (Captain mix)	Green; Lindsey; Mayo	Huff; Stewart; Tankersley	4:29
Total length:				49:44

== Personnel ==
As listed in liner notes.

Lonestar

- Richie McDonald – lead vocals, keyboards, acoustic guitar
- Dean Sams – acoustic piano, keyboards, acoustic guitar, harmonica, backing vocals
- Michael Britt – acoustic guitar, electric guitars, backing vocals
- Keech Rainwater – drums, percussion

Additional musicians

- Tim Lauer – accordion
- Steve Nathan – acoustic piano, synthesizers
- Matt Rollings – acoustic piano, Hammond B3 organ
- Gary Burnette – acoustic guitar, mandolin
- Dann Huff – electric guitars
- Biff Watson – acoustic guitar
- Bruce Bouton – pedal steel guitar, lap steel guitar
- Paul Franklin – pedal steel guitar
- Aubrey Haynie – fiddle, mandolin
- Jonathan Yudkin – mandolin
- Mike Brignardello – bass guitar
- Robbie Cheuvront – bass guitar, backing vocals
- Paul Leim – drums
- Eric Darken – percussion
- Chuck Cannon – backing vocals
- Russell Terrell – backing vocals

Technical and Design

- Lonestar – arrangements (12)
- Jeff Balding – tracking, overdub recording, mixing
- Mark Hagen – tracking assistant, additional engineer, overdub assistant, mix assistant
- Bob Wright – engineer (12), mixing (12)
- Phil Barnett – assistant engineer (12), mix assistant (12)
- Giles Reaves – digital editing
- Ken Love – mastering at MasterMix (Nashville, Tennessee)
- Mike "Frog" Griffith – production coordinator
- Susan Eaddy – art direction
- Torne White – design
- Jim "Señior" McGuire – photography
- Debra Wingo – hair, make-up
- Ann Waters – stylist

== Charts ==
=== Weekly charts ===
Chart (1999)	Peak position
Canadian Country Albums (RPM)	2
US Billboard 200	28
US Top Country Albums (Billboard)	3

=== Year-end charts ===
Chart (1999)	Position
US Billboard 200	102
US Top Country Albums (Billboard)	8
Chart (2000)	Position
Canadian Albums (Nielsen SoundScan)	65
US Billboard 200	57
US Top Country Albums (Billboard)	5
Chart (2001)	Position
Canadian Country Albums (Nielsen SoundScan)	24
US Top Country Albums (Billboard)	34
Chart (2002)	Position
Canadian Country Albums (Nielsen SoundScan)	63

== Certifications ==
Region	Certification	Certified units/sales
Canada (Music Canada)	3× Platinum	300,000^{^}
United Kingdom (BPI)	Silver	60,000^{‡}
United States (RIAA)	3× Platinum	3,000,000^{^}
^{^} Shipments figures based on certification alone.^{‡} Sales+streaming figures based on certification alone.
