= Marv Green =

American country music songwriter

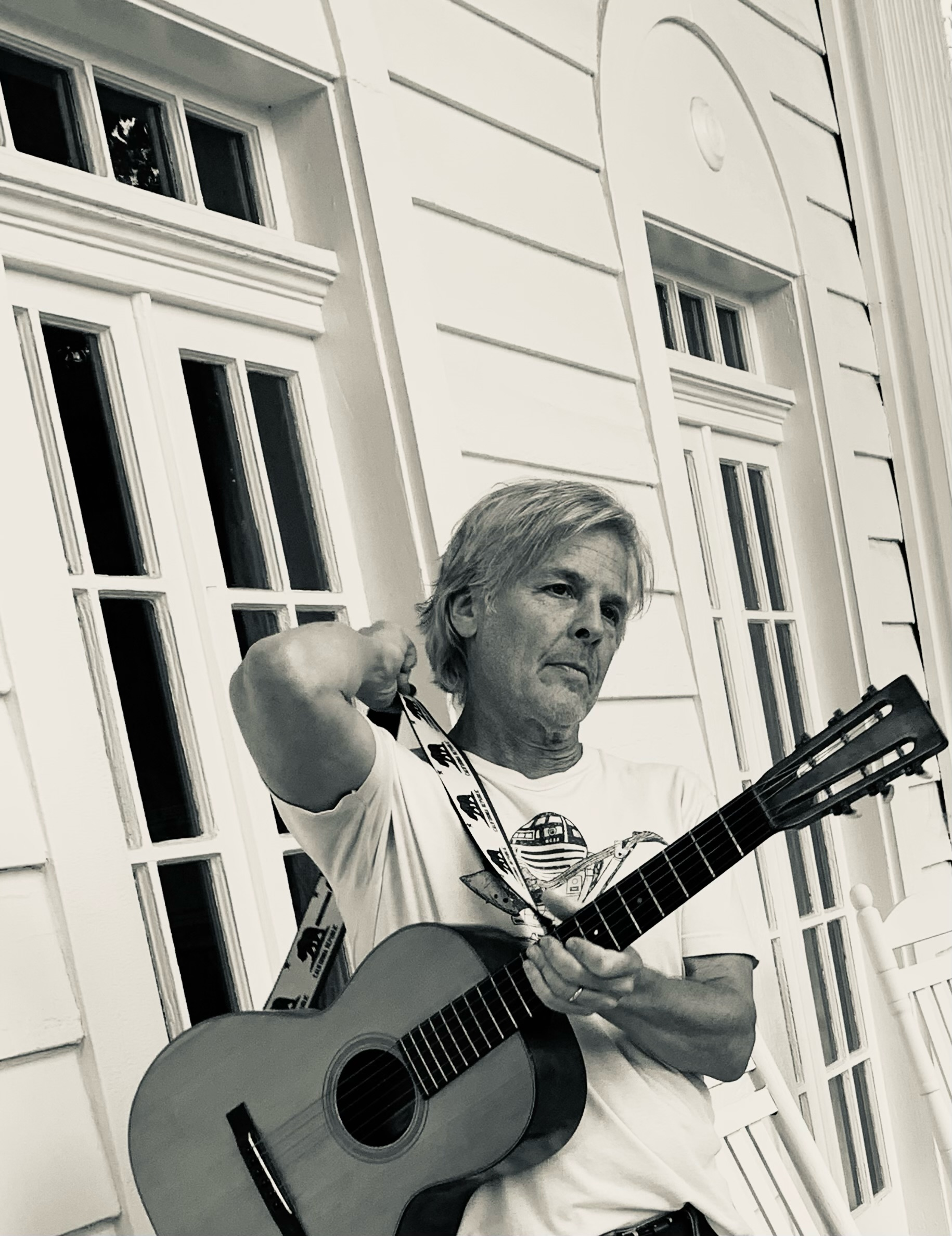
- Green in 2022

Background information
- Born: California
- Origin: Nashville, Tennessee
- Genres: Country
- Occupation: Songwriter
- Years active: 1998–present

Marv Green (born in California) is an American country music songwriter. He is known for co-writing Lonestar's 1999 single "Amazed", which reached number 1 on both the Hot Country Songs and Billboard Hot 100 charts. This song won him a Song of the Year award from Broadcast Music, Inc. (BMI).

== Discography ==
RADIO SINGLES:
SONG TITLE	ARTIST	PEAK	CHART
Amazed	Lonestar	1	Billboard Hot 100
Another You	John Rich	45	Billboard Hot Country Songs
Consider Me Gone	Reba McEntire	1	Billboard Hot Country Songs
Creepin'	Eric Church	5	Billboard Country Airplay
Cry Cry ('Til the Sun Shines)	Heidi Newfield	29	Billboard Hot Country Songs
Good Hands	Troy Olsen	36	Billboard Country Airplay
I Called Mama	Tim McGraw	8	Billboard Hot Country Songs
I'd Love You to Love Me	Emilio Navaira	56	Billboard Country Airplay
In Love by Now	Riley Green	52	Billboard Country Airplay
It Just Comes Natural	George Strait	1	Billboard Hot Country Songs
It's Always Somethin'	Joe Diffie	5	Billboard Hot Country Songs
Karma	Jessica Andrews	47	Billboard Hot Country Songs
Let's Make Love	Tim McGraw / Faith Hill	6	Billboard Hot Country Songs
Love Done Gone	Billy Currington	11	Billboard Hot Country Songs
My Best Days Are Ahead of Me	Danny Gokey	24	Billboard Country Airplay Billboard Hot Country Songs
New to This Town	Kix Brooks	31	Billboard Hot Country Songs
Pretty Good Day	Lonestar	-	-
Proud of the House We Built	Brooks & Dunn	4	Billboard Hot Country Songs
Shotgun Rider	Tim McGraw	1	Billboard Country Airplay
Slow Me Down	Sara Evans	17	Billboard Country Airplay
Straight Outta Cold Beer	Blake Shelton	36	Billboard Hot Country Songs
Stronger Woman	Jewel	13	Billboard Country Airplay Billboard Hot Country Songs
Ten Times Crazier	Blake Shelton	36	Billboard Hot Country Songs
True	George Strait	2	Billboard Hot Country Songs
Wasted	Carrie Underwood	1	Billboard Hot Country Songs
Who I Am With You	Chris Young	2	Billboard Country Airplay
Wild in Your Smile	Dustin Lynch	23	Billboard Country Airplay
You Brought the Party	Drew Baldridge / Christie Lamb	-	Billboard Country Airplay
3-2-1	Brett Kissel	3	Billboard Canada Country

SONGS RELEASED:
SONG TITLE	ARTISTS	ALBUM
A Gente Não Consegue Se Amar	Gian & Giovanni	Na Batida Do Seu Coracao
Adios Cowboy	Midland	The Last Resort: Greetings From
All the Women I Am	Reba McEntire	All the Women I Am
Amazed	Boyz II Men	Love
Are Ya With Me	James Otto	Shake What God Gave Ya
Are You Ever Gonna Love Me	Chris Cagle	Play It Loud
Beer On a Boat	Ashton Shepherd	Where Country Grows
Choose Your Partner	Bering Strait	Pages
Closer Tonight	Billy Currington	We Are Tonight
Country Knows	Lee Brice	Hey World
Day One	Chely Wright	Right in the Middle of It
Discovering You	Jimmy Lehoux	Thirteen
Don't Take Much	Jackson Dean	Jackson Dean
Everybody Wants Something	Don Amero	The Next Chapter (EP)
Evolution	Crystal Shawanda	Dawn of a New Day
Farmer's Daughter	Rodney Atkins	It's America
Fast Hearts and Slow Towns	Midland	Let It Roll
Ghost Town Train (She's Gone)	Tim McGraw	Southern Voice
Hey Paulina	Deric Ruttan	Take the Week Off
Home Sweet Highway	The Wrights	The Wrights
Hurtin' Songs	Brett Kissel	Let Your Horses Run – The Album
I Think I Love You	Diamond Rio	One More Day
I Thought I'd See Your Face Again	Sara Evans	No Place That Far
If It Wasn't for You	Lonestar	Life As We Know It
In My Head	Dierks Bentley	Home
It Ain't So Easy	Chalee Tennison	Chalee Tennison
It Did	Brad Paisley	5th Gear
It Happens	Tracy Stefans	Country Rock Star
It's Only Midnight	LoCash	Brothers
I've Got What It Takes	Tracy Byrd	I'm from the Country
Love This Pain	Lady A	Need You Now
Live This Long	Willie Nelson, Merle Haggard	Django and Jimmie
Man, Woman	Joe Nichols	Old Things New
Me	Faith Hill	Faith
Men & Mascara	Julie Roberts	Men & Mascara
More Than Everything	Rhett Akins	What Livin's All About
Never Enders	Lonestar	Never Enders
New Phone, Who's This	Chris Lane	Laps Around the Sun
Nobody Leaves a Girl Like That	Jon Pardi	Heartache Medication
Now	Jessica Andrews	Now
Nowhere	Chris LeBlanc	Too Much Nothin'
Out the Window	Laura Bryna	Trying to Be Me
Right Where We Want It	Dustin Lynch	Where It's At
River of Time	Jake Owen	Greetings from... Jake
River of You	Trisha Yearwood	Jasper County
Saved by a Southern Belle	Billy Hoffman	All I Wanted Was You
Say Hello to Goodbye	Josh Ward	More Than I Deserve
Silverado for Sale	Morgan Wallen	Dangerous: The Double Album
Sweet Little Somethin'	Jason Aldean	Old Boots, New Dirt
Things Change	Tim McGraw	Set This Circus Down
Thunder and Roses	Mindy McCready	I'm Not So Tough
Too Far Gone	Chris Janson	All In
Trouble Is	Nashville Cast ft. Hayden Panettiere	The Music of Nashville: Season 2, Vol. 1
Tweetin'	Cledus T Judd	Parodyziac!!
Two Lane Road	Canaan Smith	Bronco
Up and Down	Wade Hayes	Highways and Heartaches
Way Gone	David Lee Murphy	No Zip Code
We Were Here	Montgomery Gentry	Folks Like Us
What I Need	Rebecca Owen	Rebecca Owen
When You Get to Me	Lee Ann Womack	There's More Where That Came From
Who You Are	Erika Jo	Erika Jo
Wrong Song	Nashville Cast ft. Connie Britton / Hayden Panettiere	The Music of Nashville: Greatest Hits, Seasons 1–5
