= Chalee Tennison =

American singer-songwriter (born 1969)

- Born: April 11, 1969 (age 57)
- Origin: United States
- Genre: Country
- Instrument: Vocals
- Years active: 1999-2006
- Labels: Asylum, DreamWorks Nashville

Chalee Tennison (born April 11, 1969) is an American country music artist from the state of Texas. She has released three major-label studio albums (two on Asylum Records and one on DreamWorks Records) in addition to charting six singles on the Billboard Hot Country Singles & Tracks (now Hot Country Songs) charts. Her highest-charting singles, "Just Because She Lives There" and "Go Back", both reached No. 36 on that chart.

== Biography ==
Chalee Tennison was born in Texas and was influenced musically by her brother's collection of 8-track tapes, which included artists such as Tammy Wynette and Tanya Tucker. She sang in church choir with her mother and sister, but did not begin singing professionally until she was 16. She then started a band with her third husband, which performed in Gatesville, Texas. To support herself at the time, she also worked a variety of jobs, including waitress, substitute teacher, and prison security guard.

She moved to Nashville, Tennessee and worked as a demo singer. After record producer Jerry Taylor discovered her demos, he helped her sign to Asylum Records in 1999. Her first, self-titled album was issued that year, with "Someone Else's Turn to Cry" as the lead single. Following it were "Handful of Water" and "Just Because She Lives There", which became her first Top 40 entry on the Billboard Hot Country Songs charts, peaking at No. 36. At the time of the album's release, Tennison had been divorced three times, and was a single mother of three children, of which an uncredited review in Radio & Records stated that "Chalee Tennison sounds like she truly understands the songs she sings. maybe it's because she's lived them." Tennison told the same publication that "I feel very lucky as a new artist that I got to cut the kind of record I wanted to cut. It's very different, as far as the music itself, but it's all me." She supported the album by touring in 1999 with Alan Jackson.

Her second Asylum album was titled This Woman's Heart. Produced by Jerry Taylor, it included two more chart singles: "Makin' Up with You" and "Go Back", which also charted at No. 36. A review of "Makin' Up with You" in Billboard praised Tennison's voice but criticized the song's central message of "looking to start a fight and encouraging her man to slam doors because she loves the way he looks when he tries to be tough." The same publication published a favorable review of "Go Back", calling it " a stirring ballad that updates a long- favored tradition in country music -the trucker song." while also praising Tennison's voice and the song's melody.

In 2002, she moved to DreamWorks Records and recorded her Parading in the Rain album on that label. "Lonesome Road", the lead single to the album, charted late in the year, reaching No. 54. Another single titled "Easy Lovin' You", which featured guest vocals from her daughter Tiffany, was issued in April 2003.

== Discography ==
=== Albums ===
Title	Album details
Chalee Tennison	Release date: June 8, 1999; Label: Asylum Records
This Woman's Heart	Release date: October 10, 2000; Label: Asylum Records
Parading in the Rain	Release date: September 16, 2003; Label: DreamWorks Nashville

=== Singles ===
Year	Single	Peak chart positions		Album
Year	Single	US Country	CAN Country	Album
1999	"Someone Else's Turn to Cry"	46	86	Chalee Tennison
1999	"Handful of Water"	64	—	Chalee Tennison
2000	"Just Because She Lives There"	36	78	Chalee Tennison
2000	"Makin' Up with You"	56	—	This Woman's Heart
2001	"Go Back"	36	—	This Woman's Heart
2002	"Lonesome Road"	54	—	Parading in the Rain
2003	"Easy Lovin' You"	—	—	Parading in the Rain
2003	"Parading in the Rain"	—	—	Parading in the Rain
"—" denotes releases that did not chart

=== Guest singles ===
Year	Single	Artist	Album
2006	"Same Ol' Song and Dance"	Leland Martin	Leland Martin

=== Music videos ===
Year	Video	Director
1999	"Someone Else's Turn to Cry"	Jim Shea
1999	"Handful of Water"	Mo Fitzgibbon/Robert Walker
1999	"Just Because She Lives There"	Jim Shea
2000	"Makin' Up with You"	Jim Shea
2003	"Easy Lovin' You"	David Kriegel
2006	"Same Ol' Song and Dance" (with Leland Martin)	
