= Tell Her (Lonestar song) =

Single by Lonestar

from the album Lonely Grill
- Released: September 18, 2000
- Genre: Country pop
- Length: 3:27 (album version); 3:48 (radio mix)
- Label: BNA
- Songwriters: Craig Wiseman; Kwesi B.
- Producer: Dann Huff

Lonestar singles chronology
"What About Now" (2000)	"Tell Her" (2000)	"I'm Already There" (2001)

"Tell Her" is a song written by Craig Wiseman and Kwesi B, and recorded by American country music group Lonestar. It was released in September 2000 as the fifth and final single from their third studio album Lonely Grill (1999). The song reached number one on the Billboard country charts, becoming their sixth number one hit.

== Background ==
Co-writer Kwesi B. told The Tennessean that the idea came from a songwriting session with Craig Wiseman. At the time, Kwesi had just had an argument with his wife but reconciled with her the next day. He presented his feelings to Wiseman during the session. The two recorded a demo which was sent to producer Dann Huff, who then gave the song to Lonestar, for whom he was producing at the time. The song is in G major with a main chord pattern of Em-Am-C-G.

The song was re-recorded in 2000 for its single release, featuring a stronger instrumentation including a different string section. Despite this, the band's 2003 greatest hits compilation From There to Here: Greatest Hits uses the original album version of the song instead of the radio mix.

== Chart performance ==
"Tell Her" reached its peak of number one on the Billboard country charts for the week of February 3, 2001. It held the position for two weeks. Like "What About Now" before it, the song also reached the top 40 on the Billboard Hot 100, peaking at number 39. It was the fourth consecutive number one song from the album.

Chart (2000–2001)	Peak position
Canada Country Singles (RPM)	29 (Note: "Tell Her" had not yet peaked when RPM ceased publication in November 2000.)
US Hot Country Songs (Billboard)	1
US Billboard Hot 100	39

=== Year-end charts ===
Chart (2001)	Position
US Country Songs (Billboard)	36
