= Mr. Mom (song) =

Single by Lonestar

from the album Let's Be Us Again
- Released: July 12, 2004
- Genre: Country pop
- Length: 3:28
- Label: BNA
- Songwriters: Ron Harbin; Richie McDonald; Don Pfrimmer
- Producer: Dann Huff

Lonestar singles chronology
"Let's Be Us Again" (2004)	"Mr. Mom" (2004)	"Class Reunion (That Used to Be Us)" (2005)

"Mr. Mom" is a song written by Ron Harbin, Richie McDonald and Don Pfrimmer, and recorded by American country music band Lonestar. It was released in July 2004 as the second single from their fifth studio album Let's Be Us Again. The song reached the top of the Billboard Hot Country Singles & Tracks chart on November 20 and No. 33 on the Billboard Hot 100 on November 27, and is their ninth and final US country No. 1 and US Top 40 hit to date.

== Content ==
The song is a moderate uptempo number in which the lead singer describes his attempts to be "Mr. Mom" — i.e., a stay-at-home father attempting to raise his children while his wife is at work.

== Music video ==
The music video is a cartoon set in Nashville portraying a baby and a couple of kids, and features scenes in sync with the lyrics. When the kids' mother comes back home from work, she finds her husband tied up by the kids. Angered, she sends them (including the baby) upstairs. After the song ends, the father brings a diaper to an outside trash can, as a bus with the band’s name drives by with the baby on board, turning the background into live action, but still leaving the characters as a cartoon. Shocked, the father screams as the video fades out. The music video was animated by Powerhouse Animation & directed by Roman White and Revolution Pictures.

== Chart performance ==
"Mr. Mom" debuted at number 46 on the Hot Country Songs chart dated July 24, 2004. It charted for 28 weeks on that chart, and reached No. 1 on the chart dated November 20, 2004, and stayed there for two weeks.

Chart (2004)	Peak position
Canada Country (Radio & Records)	1
US Hot Country Songs (Billboard)	1
US Billboard Hot 100	33

=== Year-end charts ===
Chart (2004)	Position
US Country Songs (Billboard)	44

Chart (2005)	Position
US Country Songs (Billboard)	60

== Certifications ==
Region	Certification	Certified units/sales
United States (RIAA)	Gold	500,000^{^}
^{^} Shipments figures based on certification alone.
