= What About Now (Lonestar song) =

Single by Lonestar

from the album Lonely Grill
- B-side: "Smile"
- Released: April 17, 2000; May 21, 2001 (UK)
- Recorded: 1999
- Genre: Country pop; pop rock
- Length: 3:32
- Label: BNA 60212
- Songwriters: Ron Harbin; Aaron Barker; Anthony L. Smith
- Producer: Dann Huff

Lonestar singles chronology
"Smile" (1999)	"What About Now" (2000)	"Tell Her" (2000)

"What About Now" is a song recorded by American country music group Lonestar. It was released in April 2000 as the fourth single from their 1999 album Lonely Grill and it spent four weeks at the top of the Billboard Hot Country Singles & Tracks (now Hot Country Songs) chart. It was written by Ron Harbin, Aaron Barker and Anthony L. Smith.

== Critical reception ==
Deborah Evans Price, of Billboard magazine reviewed the song favorably, saying that what makes the single work is Richie McDonald's "endearing style, made so apparent with the mega success of 'Amazed'." She says that McDonald "projects a sincerity that propels the lyrical content nicely" and that the "crisp production" highlights the playing.

== Track listing ==
US promo CD single

1. "What About Now" – 3:30

US vinyl 7" single

1. "What About Now" – 3:30
2. "Smile" – 3:33

UK & Europe CD single

1. "What About Now" (Remix) – 3:30
2. "What About Now" (Original Mix) – 3:26
3. "Amazed" (Captain Mix) – 4:29

== Chart positions ==
=== Weekly charts ===
Chart (2000)	Peak position
Canada Country Singles (RPM)	1
US Billboard Hot 100	30
US Hot Country Songs (Billboard)	1

=== Year-end charts ===
Chart (2000)	Position
US Country Songs (Billboard)	3
US Hot 100 (Billboard)	90
