= Lonestar =

American country music band

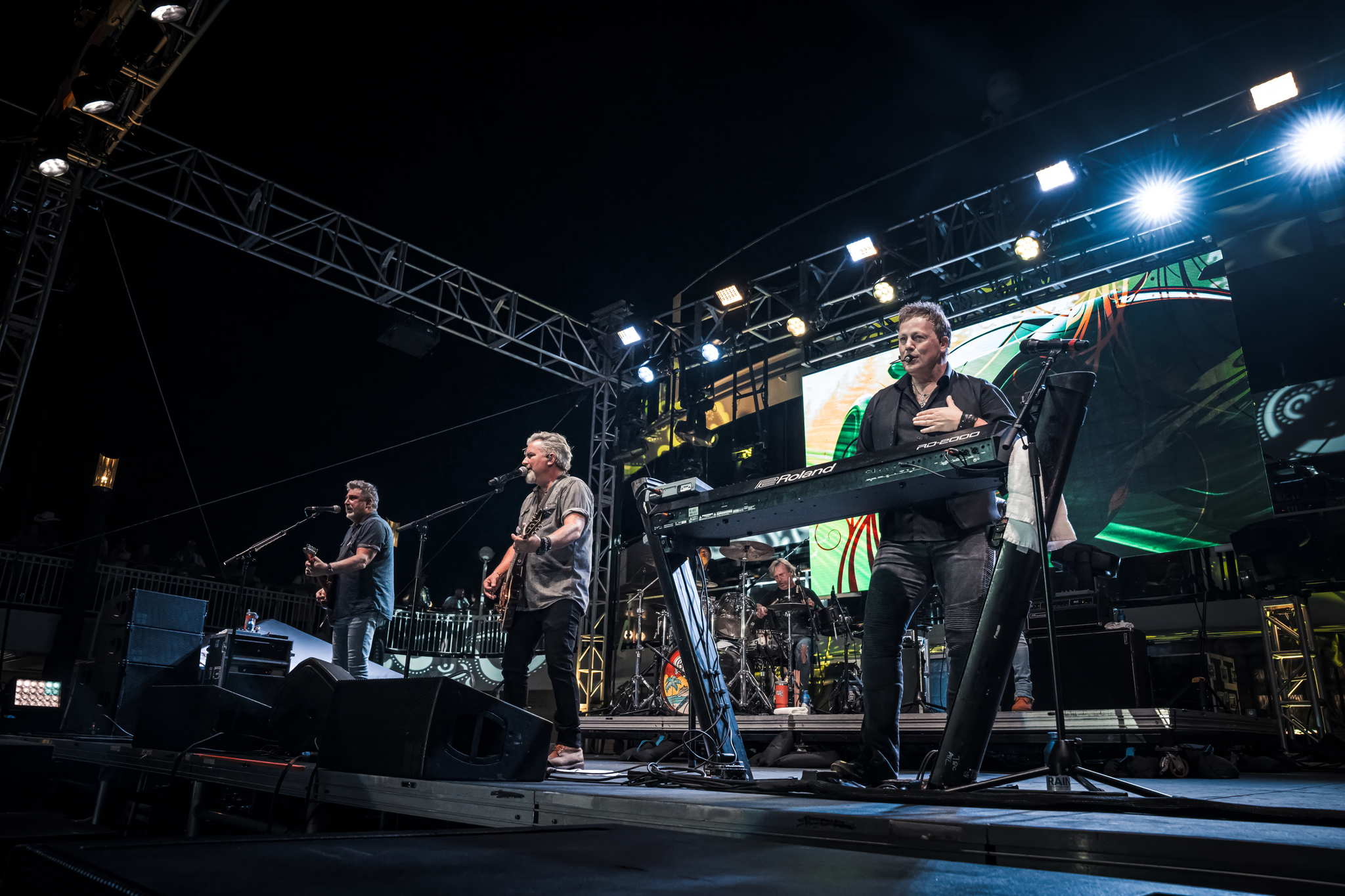
- Lonestar performing at Boots on the Water Cruise in 2025 (L–R: Michael Britt, Drew Womack, Keech Rainwater, Dean Sams)

Background information
- Also known as: Texassee
- Origin: Nashville, Tennessee, U.S.
- Genres: Country; country pop; pop rock; country rock
- Years active: 1992–present
- Labels: BNA; Saguaro Road; 4 Star; Shanachie
- Spinoffs: Big & Rich; The Frontmen
- Spinoff of: Canyon
- Members: Michael Britt; Keech Rainwater; Dean Sams; Drew Womack
- Past members: Richie McDonald; John Rich; Cody Collins
- Website: lonestarnow.com

Lonestar (formerly known as Texassee) is an American country music band from Nashville, Tennessee. The band consists of Drew Womack (lead vocals, acoustic guitar), Michael Britt (lead guitar, background vocals), Dean Sams (keyboards, acoustic guitar, background vocals), and Keech Rainwater (drums). Both Britt and Rainwater formerly recorded in the band Canyon. Britt, Sams, and Rainwater co-founded Lonestar in 1992 with original lead vocalist Richie McDonald and bass guitarist John Rich. Rich was fired from the band in 1998 and went on to join Big Kenny as one-half of the duo Big & Rich. Since his departure, Lonestar has relied alternatingly on session and touring musicians for bass guitar accompaniment. McDonald quit the band in 2007 to pursue a solo career, and was replaced by former McAlyster vocalist Cody Collins before returning in 2011. After McDonald quit a second time in 2021 to join the Frontmen, he was replaced by Womack, formerly the lead singer of Sons of the Desert.

Lonestar has charted more than 20 singles on the Hot Country Songs chart, including nine that reached number one: "No News", "Come Cryin' to Me", "Amazed", "Smile", "What About Now", "Tell Her", "I'm Already There", "My Front Porch Looking In", and "Mr. Mom". "Amazed" also charted at No. 1 on the Billboard Hot 100, becoming the first country song to do so since "Islands in the Stream" in 1983. "Amazed" and "My Front Porch Looking In" were the top country songs of 1999 and 2003, respectively, on Billboard Year-End.

The group has recorded seven albums, one EP, and a greatest hits package for the defunct BNA Records, and one album each for three different independent labels. Three of their albums have been certified platinum or higher by the Recording Industry Association of America (RIAA). The band's first two albums were defined by honky-tonk and neotraditionalist country influences, but subsequent albums largely drew from country pop. Along with his work with the band, McDonald has co-written singles for Clay Walker, the Wilkinsons, Billy Dean, and Sara Evans, in addition to singing guest vocals on Mindy McCready's 1996 single "Maybe He'll Notice Her Now".

== Foundation ==
Lonestar began in 1992 as a band named Texassee. This portmanteau name was derived from the fact that all five members were natives of Texas, and met in Nashville, Tennessee's Opryland USA theme park. The original lineup consisted of lead singer/rhythm guitarist Richie McDonald (Lubbock), lead guitarist Michael Britt (Fort Worth), drummer Randy "Keech" Rainwater (Plano), keyboardist/rhythm guitarist Dean Sams (Garland), and bass guitarist/lead and background vocalist John Rich (Amarillo). Before Lonestar's foundation, Rainwater and Britt were members of the group Canyon, which recorded two albums for the independent 16th Avenue Records and charted in the country top 40 with "Hot Nights" in 1989, as well as receiving a nomination from the Academy of Country Music Awards for Best New Vocal Duet or Group. Soon after foundation, Texassee changed its name to Lonestar. The band first played at a concert in Nashville in 1993 and signed to BNA Records in January 1995.

== Musical career ==
=== 1995–96: Lonestar Live and Lonestar ===
Lonestar's first release for BNA was an extended play titled Lonestar Live, recorded at the Wildhorse Saloon in Nashville and issued in January 1995. Their debut single, "Tequila Talkin'", was released that August, peaking at No. 8 on the Billboard Hot Country Singles & Tracks (now Hot Country Songs) chart. It was included on their self-titled debut album, which was released that October. Its producers were Don Cook (best known for his work with Brooks & Dunn) and songwriter Wally Wilson, with whom Rich wrote the track "I Love the Way You Do That". Other contributing songwriters included former solo artists Bill LaBounty, Rick Vincent, and Larry Boone. The next single, "No News", became the band's first number-one single, holding that position for three weeks in April 1996. A physical single release of "Tequila Talkin'" and "No News" as a double A-side also went to No. 22 on Bubbling Under Hot 100 Singles. After these two songs, "Runnin' Away with My Heart" also went to No. 8 on the country charts. It was followed by "When Cowboys Didn't Dance" (co-written by McDonald), which failed to reach the top 40, and "Heartbroke Every Day", the only single to feature Rich on lead vocals, at No. 18. Both of these songs had previously appeared on the Lonestar Live EP. Their chart runs both overlapped with then-labelmate Mindy McCready's "Maybe He'll Notice Her Now" (from her debut album Ten Thousand Angels), which featured McDonald as a backing vocalist and peaked at No. 18 as well.

Lonestar was met with generally favorable reviews. Stephen Thomas Erlewine of Allmusic and Brian Wahlert of Country Standard Time both praised the band for having neotraditionalist country influences in their sound, with Wahlert also stating that the use of both Rich and McDonald on lead vocals gave the album "versatility". Rick Mitchell of New Country magazine was less positive, calling the band's sound "lite rock with a twang". In 1996, Lonestar won the Academy of Country Music award for Top New Vocal Group/Duet.

=== 1997–98: Crazy Nights and John Rich's departure ===
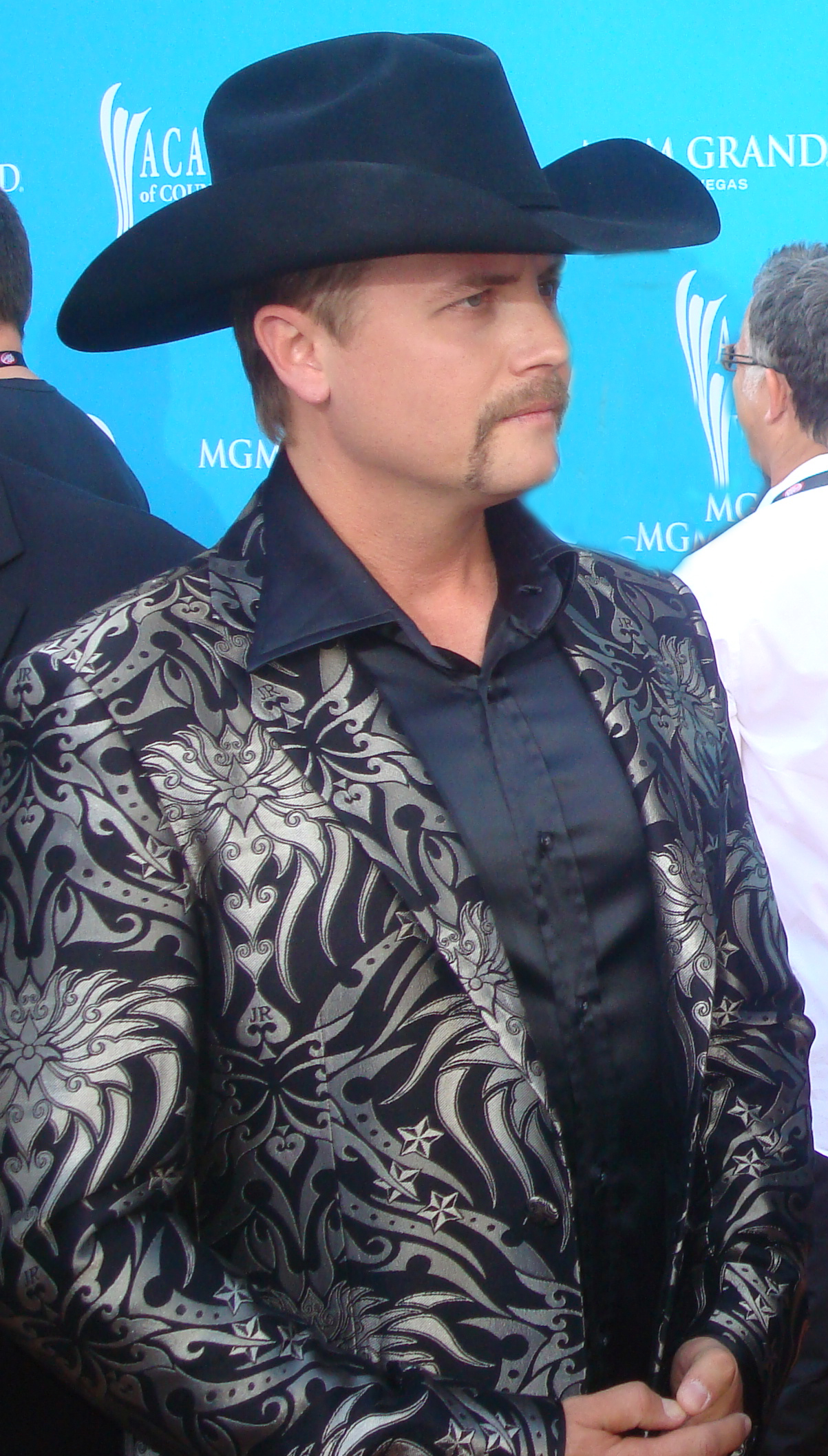
John Rich was Lonestar's bassist and occasional lead vocalist until 1998.

Lonestar's sixth chart single was "Come Cryin' to Me", which Rich and Wilson co-wrote with "No News" co-writer Mark D. Sanders. The song became the band's second number-one single in August 1997, two months after the release of its corresponding album, Crazy Nights. As with Lonestar, it was produced by Wilson and Cook. The next single, "You Walked In", was co-written by rock producer and songwriter Robert John "Mutt" Lange. It peaked at number 12 on the country charts and became the band's first entry on the Billboard Hot 100, peaking at number 93. "Say When" and "Everything's Changed" followed it, with respective peaks at thirteen and two on the country music charts in 1998. The latter also went to number 95 on the Hot 100. Boone and Paul Nelson co-wrote both of these songs, collaborating with Rich on the former and McDonald on the latter. Also included on the album was a cover of Pure Prairie League's "Amie". Thom Owens gave the album a mixed review, saying that "Come Cryin' to Me" and the "Amie" cover were "solid", but criticizing the rest as "slick and bland".

Shortly before the release of "Everything's Changed", Rich was fired from the band, as they and their advisors felt that having two lead singers would be confusing to fans. Shortly afterwards, the other four members began performing "unplugged" shows which included acoustic renditions of their songs.

=== 1999–2002: Lonely Grill, This Christmas Time, and I'm Already There ===
After Rich's departure from the band, the remaining members expressed a desire to "reinvent" their sound for their third studio album. They chose Dann Huff as their new producer, and added three members to their touring band: Robbie Cheuvront (bass guitar), Kurt Baumer (fiddle), and Jeremy Moyers (steel guitar).

Lonely Grill was released in 1999. Huff produced all of the album, except for an acoustic version of "Everything's Changed", which Sam Ramage and Bob Wright produced. In Rich's absence, Cheuvront and session musician Mike Brignardello (with whom Huff previously recorded in the rock band Giant) alternated as bassists on the album. Although lead-off single "Saturday Night" failed to make the top 40 on the country charts, its followup "Amazed" spent eight weeks at number one on the country charts. It would later reach number one on the Billboard Hot 100 as well, becoming the first song to top both the Hot Country Songs and Hot 100 charts since Kenny Rogers and Dolly Parton's "Islands in the Stream" in 1983. The song also peaked at number 2 on the Hot Adult Contemporary Tracks chart. In addition, "Amazed" was the number-one song on the 1999 Billboard Year-End chart for the country music format.

The other three singles from Lonely Grill ("Smile", "What About Now", and "Tell Her") reached the top of the country charts as well as the top 40 on the Billboard Hot 100, and the album was certified double-platinum by the Recording Industry Association of America. Erlewine found the album an improvement over Crazy Nights due to its combination of pop and country influences. "Smile" also achieved its number 1 peak on Hot Country Songs the same week that "Amazed" topped the Hot 100, making for the first time in Billboard chart history that an act had held the number one position on two different charts with two different songs. "Amazed" was also released as a single in England following its success in the States. Also in this album's timespan, McDonald co-wrote Clay Walker's "She's Always Right" and The Wilkinsons' "Jimmy's Got a Girlfriend", which were respectively released in 1999 and 2000. He worked with "No News" co-writer Phil Barnhart and Ed Hill on the former, and "What About Now" co-writers Ron Harbin and Anthony L. Smith on the latter. "Amazed" also gave the band its first Country Music Association nominations, for Single of the Year and Group of the Year.

Lonestar's first Christmas album, This Christmas Time, was released in September 2000. It featured seven traditional Christmas songs, plus three original compositions: "If Every Day Could Be Christmas", "Reason for the Season", and the title track. The latter two songs were co-written by McDonald and Sams, respectively. The renditions of "Winter Wonderland", "Have Yourself a Merry Little Christmas", "Santa Claus Is Coming to Town", and "The Little Drummer Boy" included on this album all made the country charts in late 2000 based on Christmas airplay. Allmusic criticized the album as "an unfortunately slick and forgettable collection of holiday tunes, cloyingly done in a soulless pop-country style."

I'm Already There, Lonestar's fourth album, was released in 2001. The same year, the band won the Country Music Association's award for Vocal Group of the Year. Serving as the lead single was the album's title track, which McDonald wrote with Gary Baker and Frank J. Myers. The song was inspired by McDonald's son, Rhett. It spent six weeks at number one on the country charts between June and July 2001, in addition to reaching number 24 on the Hot 100 and number two on the Adult Contemporary charts. After it, "With Me" peaked at number 10, "Not a Day Goes By" reached number 3, and the Mark McGuinn-penned "Unusually Unusual" went to number 12, with "Not a Day Goes By" also reaching the top 40 on the Hot 100. The album received a platinum certification. Maria Konicki Dinoia of Allmusic compared the album favorably to the ballads on Lonely Grill, also praising McDonald's "vocal prowess." Alanna Nash of Entertainment Weekly was less favorable, saying that Huff's production was "generic". Also in 2001, the band announced a 30-date international tour with Jamie O'Neal and Blake Shelton.

=== 2003–05: From There To Here: Greatest Hits and Let's Be Us Again ===
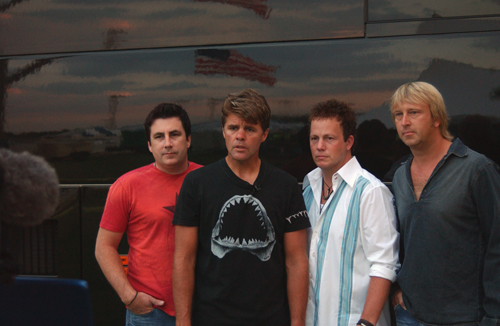
Lonestar in 2005 (L-R: Michael Britt, Richie McDonald, Dean Sams, Keech Rainwater)

BNA released Lonestar's first greatest hits package, From There to Here: Greatest Hits, in 2003. Three new songs were recorded for this album: "My Front Porch Looking In" (written by McDonald, Myers, and Don Pfrimmer), a cover of Marc Cohn's "Walking in Memphis", and "I Pray". The first two of these were both released as singles; "My Front Porch Looking In" went to number 1 and became the top country hit of 2003 on the Billboard Year-End charts, while the "Walking in Memphis" cover peaked at number 8.

Let's Be Us Again was released in May 2004. This album produced three singles, all co-written by McDonald. The title track was the first, reaching number 4 on the country charts and the Top 40 on the Hot 100 in mid-2004. "Mr. Mom" followed it, becoming their ninth and final country number one and pop top 40 hit by the end of the year. After it, "Class Reunion (That Used to Be Us)" peaked at number 16 on the country charts in early 2005. Huff produced the entire album except for the closing track "Somebody's Someone", which the band produced by itself; although never released as a single, this song charted at number 53 on the country charts in mid-2004 due to unsolicited airplay. Also included on this album was "Let Them Be Little", co-written by McDonald and Billy Dean. Dean recorded his own version of the song for his 2005 album of the same name for Curb Records, and his version peaked at number 8 on the country charts in early 2005. Another track on Let's Be Us Again, "From There to Here", featured a guest vocal from Alabama lead singer Randy Owen. Erlewine praised the album for containing more up-tempo songs than its predecessors. Jeffrey B. Remz was less favorable, writing in Country Standard Time that "everything tends to have the same typical anthemic feel making it all sound so radio ready."

=== 2005–06: Coming Home and Mountains ===
In 2005, Huff told the band that he no longer wanted to work with them, so McDonald began searching for a new producer for their next album. In doing so, he purchased fifteen different albums at a Walmart to help in seeking a new producer, and chose Justin Niebank after hearing a demo that he produced for another group called BrittonJack. On July 19, 2005, Lonestar previewed their sixth album Coming Home at Sony Music Nashville's offices, accompanied by Moyers, Cheuvront, fiddler Rob Tyler, and BrittonJack member Jack Sizemore, who also co-wrote the track "Doghouse" on it. The album was released on September 13, 2005. Only two singles were released from this album: "You're Like Comin' Home", which reached number 8, and "I'll Die Tryin'", which became their first single since "Saturday Night" to peak outside the top 40. Both of these songs were co-written by songwriter and producer Jeremy Stover, and both were previously recorded by Canadian country band Emerson Drive on their 2004 album What If? Erlewine wrote in Allmusic that Coming Home was a "perfectly dull set of songs of happy homes." Michael Sudhalter of Country Standard Time noted the presence of ballads comparable to the preceding albums, but also felt that most of the other content was comparable to the band's debut album.

Mountains was the band's final album for BNA. Released in late 2006, it was produced by Mark Bright, whose other production credits include Blackhawk, Rascal Flatts, and Carrie Underwood. Its title track, co-written by Larry Boone, went to number 10 on the country charts, while follow-up "Nothing to Prove" peaked at 51. Erlewine criticized the band for taking "fewer risks than ever" on the album. Billboard writer Ken Tucker praised the album for containing positive messages in the singles, while also noting the use of vocal harmony and country-rock instrumentation. Jeff Lincoln of Country Standard Time criticized some of the songs for overly "sensitive" lyrics, but felt that "Always in the Band", a song about a singer attempting to balance his career and family life, was "personal". At a December 2006 concert in Corpus Christi, Texas, McDonald was unavailable while recovering from back surgery, so Josh Gracin sang lead vocals in his absence.

=== 2007–11: Richie McDonald's first departure and Party Heard Around the World ===
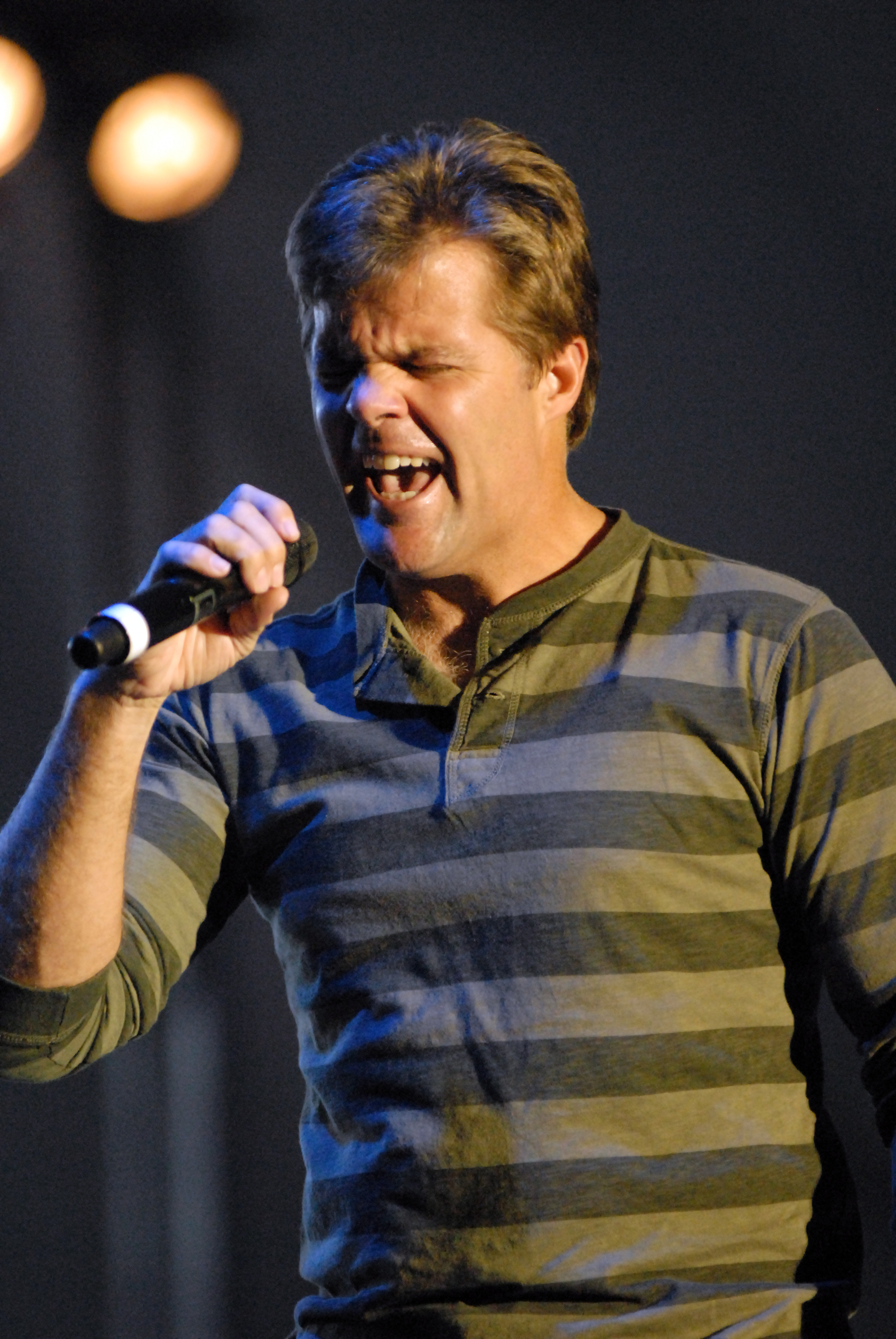
Lead vocalist Richie McDonald, pictured here in 2007, quit the band between 2007 and 2011 for a solo career. He quit again in 2021 to perform with the Frontmen.

In March 2007, Lonestar was dropped from BNA's roster due to declining sales. Britt blamed the label's choices in singles for the band's commercial downfall in the mid-2000s, saying in an interview with CMT, "I think we painted ourselves into a corner... They started putting out a bunch of family-type songs. I think that really pigeonholed us. The majority of the band didn't really want to continue doing that same thing. But that's what kept getting put out." McDonald also announced that he would be leaving the band at the end of 2007 to begin a solo career. Cody Collins, who had previously been the lead singer of the band McAlyster in 2000, was confirmed as his replacement. Lonestar's first release with Collins as lead singer was the 2007 Christmas music compilation titled My Christmas List, available exclusively at the restaurant and gift shop chain Cracker Barrel. Dan MacIntosh of Country Standard Time reviewed this album favorably, calling Collins' voice a "comfortable fit" while also praising the variety of arrangements given to traditional Christmas carols on the album.

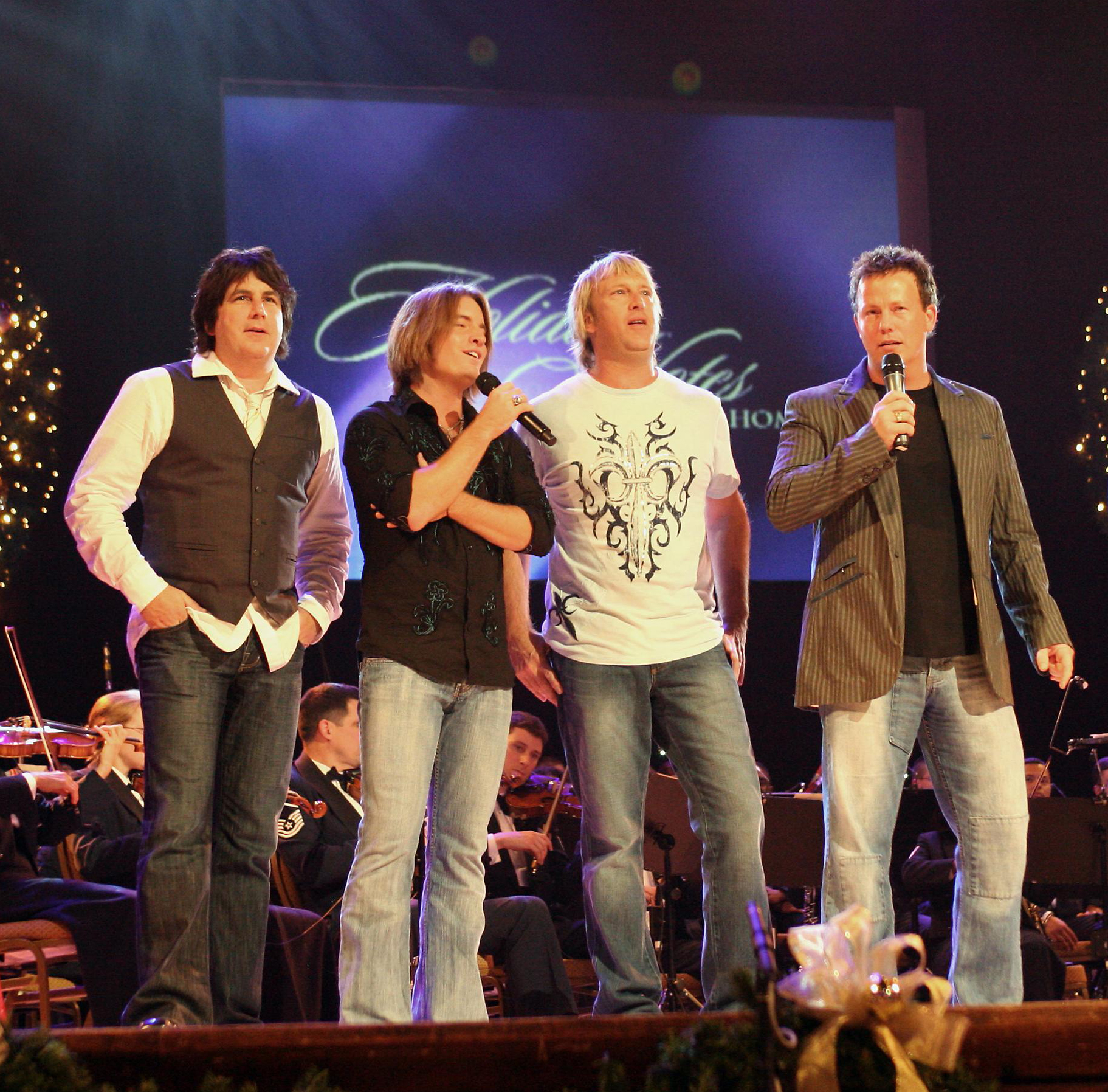
Lonestar performing in 2007 with Cody Collins (second from left)

The band's first single to feature Collins on lead vocals was "Let Me Love You", which was released in early 2008 on Saguaro Road Records. It is the first single from the album Party Heard Around the World, released on April 27, 2010, and produced by the band itself. A review in Country Standard Time criticized Collins' vocals as being too similar to those of Keith Urban, while also saying that it had "[a] lot of songs about love, life and relationships. The usual clichés you find in today's pop-country." Erlewine found little difference in the band's sound following the change to Collins, saying that "they're still gunning for a wide audience because commercialism simply is in their bones. The Lonestar name means nothing if the band isn't big, slick, and crowd-pleasing."

=== 2011–2021: Cody Collins' departure, Richie McDonald's return, Life As We Know It and Never Enders ===
Collins quit the band in 2011 and McDonald returned to the band. To honor both his rejoining and the band's 20th anniversary, they began an international tour in 2012. Their first single since McDonald's return was "The Countdown", released via 4 Star Records. It peaked at number 52 on the country charts in late 2012. The song is included on an album titled Life as We Know It, released on June 4, 2013. Erlewine was mixed toward the album's content, writing in Allmusic that it was "filled with bright, shiny songs about romance...infused with a genial fondness for everything that comes their way...All this sounds sweet enough in theory, but in execution, the calculation is a bit too apparent." Henry L. Carrigan Jr. of Country Standard Time wrote that it "is all about singing it loud, with one song barely distinguishable from another musically or thematically".

In 2014, duo Haley & Michaels released "Just Another Love Song", which they wrote with McDonald. The song contains lyrical references to "Amazed", and features McDonald singing its chorus. Never Enders, Lonestar's tenth album, came out in 2016. The album's lead single and title track was delivered to country radio on March 17. Never Enders was released and distributed through Shanachie Entertainment on April 29. Erlewine was more positive toward this album than its predecessors, noting that "The songs may not be grabbers, but they're sturdy, melodic constructions given a lift by an enveloping, polished production that effectively softens the rougher edges of McDonald's voice; he's hardly gravelly, but he is nicely weathered." The album received a mixed review from Lincoln, who found some of the songwriting formulaic but also praised the melody of the title track and McDonald's singing voice.

=== 2021–present: Richie McDonald's second departure ===
On March 5, 2021, McDonald announced that he would again be quitting Lonestar to pursue a career as a member of The Frontmen, which also consists of former Little Texas lead singer Tim Rushlow and Restless Heart lead singer Larry Stewart. McDonald was succeeded by Drew Womack, the former lead singer of Sons of the Desert, as Lonestar's new lead vocalist. In 2023, the band announced they would begin a new tour with Womack and would also release a new album titled Ten to 1. This album will feature all of the band's greatest hits re-recorded with Womack's vocals. The first such re-recording, of "Amazed", was issued in March 2023.

== Musical style ==
Early on, the band's sound drew from honky-tonk and neotraditional country influences, but shifted more toward a country pop sound with subsequent albums. Erlewrine noted in a review of Let's Be Us Again that "Toward the end of the '90s, Lonestar decided to move firmly into the mainstream of contemporary country, leaving behind any hardcore country influences they may have had in favor of sweet anthemic ballads and poppy country-rockers." He had previously compared their debut album to Merle Haggard and George Jones, while a review of the same in Country Standard Time said that the band seemed "very similar to Shenandoah — energetic and fun, but not spectacular." The same review praised the same album for having "clever wordplay" on "No News" and prominent fiddle and steel guitar on "Runnin' Away with My Heart". Allmusic writer Thom Owens found the second album "veering toward smooth, Eagles-influenced contemporary country". Of Lonely Grill, Erlewine also stated that "Lonestar began as a fairly straight-ahead country band, indebted to pure honky tonk. With their second record, they moved themselves toward pop and, ironically, it didn't pay off in great dividends, even if it spawned a Top 10 single. For their third album, Lonely Grill, they take a middle ground, moving back toward hardcore country while retaining elements of the pop sheen of Crazy Nights." That album's "Amazed" also became a popular choice for fans to play at their weddings, while also becoming their first song to enter Adult Contemporary playlists.

Dinoia noted that I'm Already There continued to emphasize the band's focus on "passionate ballads" as exemplified by "Amazed", while Jeffrey B. Remz of Country Standard Time described the same album's sound as "satisfactory music that is squarely in the country light category, but never really goes beyond that." He also noted in a review of Let's Be Us Again that the "big sound" achieved on that album and the ones immediately before it was the result of Huff's production style. For the Coming Home album, the band members said that they wanted to achieve a sound with more "edge" and less influenced by such ballads. As is typical of country music bands, most of their albums featured session musicians instead of having the individual members play most of the instruments themselves. New Country magazine's review of their debut album criticized the band's sound for this reason, while Andrew W. Griffin of Country Standard Time also noted the effect on the band's overall sound: "McDonald's voice made Lonestar. It's a good voice. Full of passion and country-embracing enthusiasm. As for his bandmates, Lonestar relied way too much on sidemen to have developed a discernible sound of their own."

== Television appearances ==
McDonald competed on one episode of the television game show Wheel of Fortune recorded at the Grand Ole Opry house in Nashville and aired in February 2003. The episode was part of a special week that paired contestants with country music singers, who made donations to charity equivalent to their respective contestants' winnings. For his episode, McDonald donated to Habitat for Humanity. All four members of Lonestar appeared on separate episodes of the same game show that aired in February 2007, during another week with identical gameplay and payouts. McDonald and Britt both won the bonus round, respectively donating $61,000 for St. Jude Children's Research Hospital and $59,350 for Adopt-a-Platoon, while Sams and Rainwater won $10,000 each for charities. The group also appeared on The Price Is Right, serving as the house band on the episode that aired June 17, 2010. They performed the show's theme song, along with a sample of songs from Party Heard Around the World.

== Personnel ==
Current members

- Drew Womack - lead vocals, acoustic guitar, electric guitar, banjo (2021–present)
- Michael Britt (born June 15, 1966) - electric guitar, acoustic guitar, background vocals (1992–present)
- Dean Sams (born August 3, 1966) - keyboards, acoustic guitar, electric guitar, harmonica, background vocals (1992–present)
- Randy "Keech" Rainwater (born January 24, 1963) - drums, percussion (1992–present)

Former members

- Richie McDonald (born February 6, 1962) - lead vocals, acoustic guitar, keyboards (1992–2008, 2011–2021)
- John Rich (born January 7, 1974) - bass guitar, lead and background vocals (1992–1998)
- Cody Collins (born June 1, 1984) - lead vocals, acoustic guitar (2008–2011)

Current touring musicians

- Robby Wilson - bass guitar, vocals

Former touring musicians

- Kurt Baumer - fiddle
- Robbie Cheuvront - bass guitar
- Jeremy Moyers - steel guitar

== Discography ==
=== Albums ===
- Lonestar (1995)
- Crazy Nights (1997)
- Lonely Grill (1999)
- I'm Already There (2001)
- Let's Be Us Again (2004)
- Coming Home (2005)
- Mountains (2006)
- Party Heard Around the World (2010)
- Life as We Know It (2013)
- Never Enders (2016)

Number-one singles (Billboard Hot Country Songs)

- "No News" (1996)
- "Come Cryin' to Me" (1997)
- "Amazed" (1999)
- "Smile" (1999)
- "What About Now" (2000)
- "Tell Her" (2000-2001)
- "I'm Already There" (2001)
- "My Front Porch Looking In" (2003)
- "Mr. Mom" (2004)

== Works cited ==
- Whitburn, Joel (2012). Hot Country Songs 1944 to 2012. Record Research, Inc. ISBN 978-0-89820-177-2.
