= Let's Be Us Again =

Studio album by Lonestar
- Released: May 25, 2004
- Recorded: 2003–2004
- Genres: Country; pop; rock
- Length: 50:21
- Label: BNA
- Producers: Dann Huff; Lonestar

Lonestar chronology
From There to Here: Greatest Hits (2003)	Let's Be Us Again (2004)	Coming Home (2005)

Singles from Let's Be Us Again
- 1. "Let's Be Us Again" Released: March 1, 2004; 2. "Mr. Mom" Released: July 12, 2004; 3. "Class Reunion (That Used to Be Us)" Released: January 17, 2005

Professional ratings
Review scores
Source	Rating
About.com	link
Allmusic	link
BBC Music	(mixed) link
People	link
Rolling Stone	Archived August 28, 2007, at the Wayback Machine

Let's Be Us Again is the sixth studio album by American country music group Lonestar. It was released in 2004 on BNA Records, and has been certified gold by the RIAA in the United States. The album produced three singles for the group on the Billboard Hot Country Songs charts: the title track (number 4), "Mr. Mom" (number 1), and "Class Reunion (That Used to Be Us)" (number 16). Additionally, "Somebody's Someone" charted at number 53 from unsolicited airplay.

The song "Let Them Be Little" was also recorded in late 2004 by its co-writer Billy Dean on his 2004 album Let Them Be Little, from which it was released as a single. Dean's rendition of the song reached number 8 on the country charts in early 2005.

== Track listing ==
All tracks produced by Dann Huff except "Somebody's Someone" produced by Lonestar.

No.	Title	Writer(s)	Length
1.	"Class Reunion (That Used to Be Us)"	Robbie Cheuvront; Richie McDonald; Chris Waters	4:33
2.	"County Fair"	McDonald; Frank J. Myers; Don Pfrimmer	4:32
3.	"Let's Be Us Again"	Maribeth Derry; Tommy Lee James; McDonald	3:53
4.	"That Gets Me"	Bob DiPiero; McDonald; Tom Shapiro	3:53
5.	"Women Rule the World"	Brett James; Dean Sams	3:53
6.	"What I Miss the Most"	Michael Britt; McDonald; Myers	3:54
7.	"Let Them Be Little"	Billy Dean; McDonald	4:01
8.	"T. G. I. F."	Philip Douglas; Ron Harbin; McDonald	2:54
9.	"Summertime"	Rivers Rutherford; Sams; Shapiro	3:55
10.	"Now"	Steve Robson; Jeffrey Steele	4:05
11.	"Mr. Mom"	Harbin; McDonald; Pfrimmer	3:28
12.	"From There to Here" (featuring Randy Owen)	Harbin; McDonald; Pfrimmer	3:32
13.	"Somebody's Someone"	McDonald	4:20
Total length:			50:21

== Personnel ==
Compiled from liner notes.

=== Lonestar ===
- Richie McDonald – lead vocals, keyboards, acoustic guitar
- Dean Sams – acoustic piano, keyboards, acoustic guitar, harmonica, backing vocals
- Michael Britt – electric lead guitar, acoustic lead guitar, backing vocals
- Keech Rainwater – drums, percussion

=== Additional musicians ===
- Tim Akers – keyboards
- Jimmy Nichols – keyboards, acoustic piano, strings
- Matt Rollings – acoustic piano
- Dann Huff – electric guitars
- B. James Lowry – acoustic guitar
- John Willis – acoustic guitar
- Paul Franklin – steel guitar
- Mike Brignardello – bass guitar
- Keith Horne – bass guitar (13)
- Paul Leim – drums
- Eric Darken – percussion
- Rob Hajacos – fiddle
- Jonathan Yudkin – fiddle, mandolin
- Dan Hochhalter – fiddle (13)
- Russell Terrell – backing vocals
- Randy Owen – lead vocals (12)

=== Technical ===
- Adam Ayan – mastering at Gateway Mastering (Portland, Maine)

Tracks 1–12

- Mike "Frog" Griffith – production coordinator
- Jeff Balding – recording, mixing
- Brady Barnett – recording
- Jed Hackett – recording, recording assistant
- Mark Hagen – recording
- Justin Niebank – recording
- David Bryant – recording assistant, mix assistant
- Jesse Amend – recording assistant
- Scott Kidd – mix assistant
- Christopher Rowe – digital editing
- Recorded at Emerald Entertainment and Jane's Place (Nashville, Tennessee).
- Mixed at Emerald Entertainment

Track 13

- Pat McMakin – recording, mixing
- Paul Hart – recording assistant
- Lowell Reynolds – mix assistant
- Recorded at Sony/Tree Studios (Nashville, Tennessee).
- Mixed at Blackbird Studio (Nashville, Tennessee).

=== Design ===
- Astrid Herbold May – art direction, design
- Russ Harrington – photography
- Melissa Schleicher – grooming
- Trish Townsend – stylist

== Charts ==
=== Weekly charts ===
Chart (2004)	Peak position
US Billboard 200	14
US Top Country Albums (Billboard)	2

=== Year-end charts ===
Chart (2004)	Position
US Top Country Albums (Billboard)	41
Chart (2005)	Position
US Top Country Albums (Billboard)	53

== Certifications ==
Region	Certification	Certified units/sales
United States (RIAA)	Gold	500,000^{^}
^{^} Shipments figures based on certification alone.
