= Wally Wilson =

American record producer (born 1947)

- Also known as: Wally
- Born: Walter Henry Wilson; September 19, 1947 (age 78); Dallas, Texas, U.S.
- Origin: American
- Genres: Country
- Occupations: Concert producer, songwriter, publishing business owner/ record Producer/Musician
- Instrument: Piano/Keys
- Years active: 1967–present
- Label: Skyville Records
- Website: skyvillenashville.com

Wally Wilson (born September 19, 1947), is an American record producer and songwriter music publisher and concert producer based in Nashville.

== Career ==
Wally Wilson has had many varied careers in the music business. He has worked as a traveling musician, a hit songwriter, a record producer, a music executive and publisher, and a promoter and producer of concerts. He has worked with artists as diverse as Gregg Allman, Gladys Knight, Steve Earle, Emmylou Harris, Dr. John, Leon Russell, Bo Diddley, the Neville Brothers, Junior Wells, Amy Grant, Trisha Yearwood, Lone Star, Lorrie Morgan, Billy Gibbons, Patty Loveless, Jerry Lee Lewis, Toby Keith and many others. Working with Kenny Greenberg, Wilson produced two records for Joan Baez in the 1990s. One of those, Play Me Backwards (1992) received a Grammy nomination. Baez credited Wilson and Greenberg for helping her to move towards a more mainstream style. In an interview, she said, "Wally's most famous remark was this: 'Ya know Joan, just because ya know how to write po'try don't mean ya know how to write a decent song.' I was livid. And I knew by how angry I was how close to the truth he probably was. They write in a very different way than I do..."

Wilson produced the hit country group Lonestar for BNA Records, at times co-producing with Don Cook. Wilson produced many other recordings in the 1990s, and created the female duo Regina Regina who were one of the "Top New Stars of 1997" according to Country America magazine. Wilson has written many hit songs recorded by country and blues artists, including Joe Cocker, Aaron Neville, Lonestar, Doug Stone, Linda Ronstadt, The Fabulous Thunderbirds, Rascal Flatts, and others. In the mid-1990s he was part of a team of songwriters at Sony/ATV Tree whom CEO Donna Hilley valued for having both songwriting and producing credentials. In 1996 MCA Music Nashville hired him as senior director of its new production company. Wilson is also a successful music publisher, and along with partners Paul Worley and Glen Morgan, owns Skyline Music Publishing in Nashville.

Wilson began his career in Nashville working as a janitor at Tree Publishing Company, not unlike Kris Kristofferson years earlier. Wilson lives in Nashville and is still active in songwriting, concert, and record production.

In 2010 Wilson and business partners Paul Worley and Glen Morgan expanded their operations forming Skyville Records, an independent country label with Sony distribution. Under the agreement, Sony Music Nashville offers manufacturing, sales and copyright administration. Under the creative direction of producer Paul Worley, Skyville develops and produces new talent. Working with agents at CAA, including Rod Essig and Blake McDaniel, Wilson focuses Skyville's business model on putting its independent acts out on the road while promoting new music.

In 2012, Wilson returned to songwriting when he collaborated with artist and brother-in-law, Raul Malo, on the Mavericks reunion project.

In 2015, Wilson created "Skyville Live", an Emmy Award-winning≠ online televised concert series featuring some of the biggest names in both classic rock and country music and Americana music×.
