= From There to Here: Greatest Hits =

Greatest hits album by Lonestar
- Released: June 3, 2003; June 23, 2003 (Europe)
- Recorded: 1994–2003
- Genres: Country; pop; rock
- Length: 64:47 (U.S. version)
- Label: BNA
- Producers: Don Cook; Wally Wilson; Dann Huff

Lonestar chronology
I'm Already There (2001)	From There to Here: Greatest Hits (2003)	Let's Be Us Again (2004)

Singles from From There to Here: Greatest Hits
- 1. "My Front Porch Looking In" Released: March 10, 2003; 2. "Walking in Memphis" Released: August 11, 2003

From There To Here: Greatest Hits is the first greatest hits album by American country music group Lonestar. In addition to chronicling the greatest hits from their first four studio albums, the album includes three newly recorded tracks "My Front Porch Looking In", "Walking in Memphis" (a cover of the 1991 Marc Cohn song) and "I Pray", as well as a second recording of their 2001 single "I'm Already There". "My Front Porch Looking In" and "Walking in Memphis" were both released as singles.

== Content ==
From There to Here: Greatest Hits comprises thirteen tracks from the band's first four albums, arranged chronologically and starting with the band's 1995 debut single "Tequila Talkin'" from their debut album Lonestar up to "Not a Day Goes By" from 2001's I'm Already There.

Also included on this album are three new recordings: "My Front Porch Looking In" and "I Pray", as well as a cover of Marc Cohn's "Walking in Memphis". "My Front Porch Looking In" and "Walking in Memphis" were both released as singles in 2003, respectively reaching number 1 and number 8 on the U.S. country charts. Closing off the album on the North American version is a remix of "I'm Already There" entitled the "Message from Home". This remix is interspersed with telephone calls placed by family members of soldiers. The international version replaces this track with two others: "Love Can Change Your Mind", recorded for the 1999 film Jesus, and "Gimme All Your Lovin'", a cover of a ZZ Top song recorded for the 2002 tribute album Sharp Dressed Men: A Tribute to ZZ Top.

== Critical reception ==
Professional ratings
Review scores
Source	Rating
About.com	favorable
Allmusic	4/5 stars
Country Weekly	favorable
Robert Christgau	(dud)

Stephen Thomas Erlewine gave the album four stars out of five on Allmusic, where he called it a "fine retrospective" of the band's sound. In the Consumer Guide, however, Robert Christgau gave the album a "dud" rating and called it "a bad record whose details rarely merit further thought."

== Track listing ==
North American version
No.	Title	Writer(s)	Album	Length
1.	"Tequila Talkin'"	Bill LaBounty; Chris Waters	Lonestar, 1995	3:27
2.	"No News" (radio edit)	Phil Barnhart; Sam Hogin; Mark D. Sanders	Lonestar	2:53
3.	"Runnin' Away with My Heart"	Michael Britt; Hogin; Sanders	Lonestar	2:53
4.	"Come Cryin' to Me"	John Rich; Sanders; Wally Wilson	Crazy Nights, 1997	3:31
5.	"You Walked In"	Bryan Adams; Robert John "Mutt" Lange	Crazy Nights	4:31
6.	"Everything's Changed"	Larry Boone; Paul Nelson; Richie McDonald	Crazy Nights	3:53
7.	"Amazed"	Marv Green; Chris Lindsey; Aimee Mayo	Lonely Grill, 1999	4:01
8.	"Smile"	Keith Follesé; Lindsey	Lonely Grill	3:35
9.	"What About Now"	Aaron Barker; Ron Harbin; Anthony L. Smith	Lonely Grill	3:32
10.	"Tell Her" (album version)	Kwesi B.; Craig Wiseman	Lonely Grill	3:28
11.	"I'm Already There"	Gary Baker; McDonald; Frank J. Myers; David Zippel	I'm Already There, 2001	4:13
12.	"With Me"	Brett James; Troy Verges	I'm Already There	3:51
13.	"Not a Day Goes By"	Maribeth Derry; Steve Diamond	I'm Already There	4:07
14.	"My Front Porch Looking In"	McDonald; Myers; Don Pfrimmer	Previously unreleased, 2003	3:45
15.	"I Pray"	Chuck Cannon; James Dean Hicks	Previously unreleased, 2003	3:47
16.	"Walking in Memphis"	Marc Cohn	Previously unreleased, 2003	3:50
17.	"I'm Already There" (Message from Home version)	Baker; McDonald; Myers; Zippel	I'm Already There	4:31

International version
No.	Title	Writer(s)	Album	Length
1.	"Tequila Talkin'"	LaBounty; Waters	Lonestar	3:27
2.	"No News" (radio edit)	Barnhart; Hogin; Sanders	Lonestar	2:53
3.	"Runnin' Away with My Heart"	Britt; Hogin; Sanders	Lonestar	2:53
4.	"Come Cryin' to Me"	Rich; Sanders; Wilson	Crazy Nights	3:31
5.	"You Walked In"	Adams; Lange	Crazy Nights	4:31
6.	"Everything's Changed"	Boone; Nelson; McDonald	Crazy Nights	3:53
7.	"Amazed"	Green; Lindsey; Mayo	Lonely Grill	4:01
8.	"Smile"	Follesé; Lindsey	Lonely Grill	3:35
9.	"What About Now"	Barker; Harbin; Smith	Lonely Grill	3:32
10.	"Tell Her" (album version)	Kwesi B.; Wiseman	Lonely Grill	3:28
11.	"I'm Already There"	Baker; McDonald; Myers; Zippel	I'm Already There	4:13
12.	"With Me"	James; Verges	I'm Already There	3:51
13.	"Not a Day Goes By"	Derry; Diamond	I'm Already There	4:07
14.	"My Front Porch Looking In"	McDonald; Myers; Pfrimmer	Previously unreleased	3:45
15.	"I Pray"	Cannon; Hicks	Previously unreleased	3:47
16.	"Walking in Memphis"	Cohn	Previously unreleased	3:50
17.	"Love Can Change Your Mind"	Bob Farrell; Regie Hamm	Jesus: Music from and Inspired by the Epic Mini-Series, 2000	4:17
18.	"Gimme All Your Lovin'"	Frank Beard; Billy Gibbons; Joe Michael Hill	Sharp Dressed Men: A Tribute to ZZ Top, 2002	4:24

== Production ==
- Don Cook and Wally Wilson – tracks 1–6
- Dann Huff – tracks 7–17 (7–18 on international version)

== Personnel on new tracks ==
- Tim Akers – keyboards
- Mike Brignardello – bass guitar
- Michael Britt – electric guitar
- Stuart Duncan – fiddle
- Paul Franklin – steel guitar
- Dann Huff – electric guitar
- Paul Leim – drums
- Richie McDonald – lead vocals
- Jimmy Nichols – keyboards
- Matt Rollings – keyboards
- Dean Sams – keyboards, background vocals
- Russell Terrell – background vocals
- John Willis – acoustic guitar

== Charts ==
=== Weekly charts ===
Chart (2003)	Peak position
US Billboard 200	7
US Top Country Albums (Billboard)	1

=== Year-end charts ===
Chart (2003)	Position
US Billboard 200	99
US Top Country Albums (Billboard)	14
Chart (2004)	Position
US Top Country Albums (Billboard)	32
Chart (2005)	Position
US Top Country Albums (Billboard)	75

== Certifications ==
Region	Certification	Certified units/sales
Canada (Music Canada)	Gold	50,000^{^}
United States (RIAA)	Platinum	1,000,000^{^}
^{^} Shipments figures based on certification alone.
