= Lonestar (album) =

Studio album by Lonestar
- Released: October 10, 1995
- Recorded: 1994–1995
- Studio: Soundshop Studio "A" (Nashville, Tennessee)
- Genre: Country; neotraditional country
- Length: 33:22
- Label: BNA
- Producer: Don Cook; Wally Wilson

Lonestar chronology
Lonestar (1995)	Crazy Nights (1997)

Singles from Lonestar
- 1. "Tequila Talkin'" Released: August 7, 1995; 2. "No News" Released: January 8, 1996; 3. "Runnin' Away with My Heart" Released: May 20, 1996; 4. "When Cowboys Didn't Dance" Released: September 1996; 5. "Heartbroke Every Day" Released: December 7, 1996

Lonestar is the debut studio album by American country music band Lonestar. Released in 1995 via BNA Records, it features five singles: "Tequila Talkin'", "No News", "Runnin' Away With My Heart", "Heartbroke Every Day", and "When Cowboys Didn't Dance", of which "No News" was a Number One hit on the Billboard country charts. The album has been certified gold by the Recording Industry Association of America for shipping 500,000 copies in the United States.

== Content ==
The album's lead-off single was "Tequila Talkin'", which reached a peak of No. 8 on the Billboard country charts. "No News" was the band's first number-one hit, (the B-side to "Tequila Talkin'"), which spent three weeks at the top of the country charts. "Runnin' Away With My Heart" also peaked at No. 8, followed by the No. 45 "When Cowboys Didn't Dance" (which was much more successful in Canada, peaking at No. 18 there), and finally, the No. 18 "Heartbroke Every Day". The latter overlapped on the charts with "Maybe He'll Notice Her Now," a duet between Lonestar's then-lead singer Richie McDonald and Mindy McCready, who also recorded on BNA at the time.

Also included on the album is a cover of Roy Clark's 1982 single "Paradise Knife and Gun Club".

== Critical reception ==
The album received mixed critical reception. Stephen Thomas Erlewine gave it four stars out of five in his Allmusic review, where he called the album's sound "an accomplished and impassioned hardcore honky tonk." Brian Wahlert of Country Standard Time magazine gave a mostly-favorable review, saying that the album was "solid [and] traditional," but also saying "Lonestar seems very similar to Shenandoah — energetic and fun, but not spectacular." Rick Mitchell of New Country magazine gave a one-and-a-half star rating, with his review criticizing the album for relying on a large number of studio musicians and background singers, and calling the sound "lite rock with a twang."

== Track listing ==
No.	Title	Writer(s)	Length
1.	"Heartbroke Every Day"	Cam King; Bill LaBounty; Rick Vincent	3:07
2.	"Tequila Talkin'"	LaBounty; Chris Waters	3:24
3.	"I Love the Way You Do That"	Don Cook; John Rich; Wally Wilson	3:51
4.	"Runnin' Away with My Heart"	Michael Britt; Sam Hogin; Mark D. Sanders	3:30
5.	"What Would It Take"	Hogin; Billy Lawson; Wilson	3:12
6.	"Does Your Daddy Know About Me"	Larry Boone; Paul Nelson; Rich	3:01
7.	"Ragtop Cadillac"	Lawson	2:30
8.	"No News"	Phil Barnhart; Hogin; Sanders	2:53
9.	"Paradise Knife and Gun Club"	Chick Rains	3:56
10.	"When Cowboys Didn't Dance"	T. Kyle Green; Richie McDonald	3:58
Total length:			33:22

== Personnel ==
As listed in liner notes.

Lonestar

- Richie McDonald – lead vocals (2, 4, 5, 8, 10), acoustic guitar, keyboards, backing vocals
- Dean Sams – acoustic piano, keyboards, acoustic guitar, harmonica, backing vocals
- Michael Britt – electric guitar, B-Bender guitar, acoustic guitar, backing vocals
- John Rich – lead vocals (1, 3, 6, 7, 9), bass guitar, backing vocals
- Keech Rainwater – drums

Additional musicians

- Dennis Burnside – acoustic piano, keyboards, Hammond B3 organ, string arrangements
- Mark Casstevens – acoustic guitar
- Brent Mason – electric guitar
- John Willis – electric guitar, electric sitar
- Bruce Bouton – slide guitar, pedal steel guitar
- Michael Rhodes – bass guitar
- Glenn Worf – bass guitar
- Lonnie Wilson – drums, percussion, hand claps
- Rob Hajacos – fiddle, "assorted hoe-down tools"
- Nashville String Machine – strings
- John Wesley Ryles – backing vocals
- Dennis Wilson – backing vocals
- Curtis Young – backing vocals

Production

- Don Cook – producer
- Wally Wilson – producer
- Mike Bradley – recording, mixing
- Mark Capps – recording assistant, mix assistant
- John Kunz – recording assistant, mix assistant
- Hank Williams – mastering at MasterMix (Nashville, Tennessee)
- Scott Johnson – production assistant
- Susan Eaddy – art direction
- Deb Mahalanobis – design
- Peter Nash – photography

== Chart performance ==
Chart (1995)	Peak position
U.S. Billboard Top Country Albums	11
U.S. Billboard 200	69
U.S. Billboard Top Heatseekers	2
Canadian RPM Country Albums	2

== Certifications ==
Region	Certification	Certified units/sales
Canada (Music Canada)	Gold	50,000^{^}
United States (RIAA)	Gold	500,000^{^}
^{^} Shipments figures based on certification alone.
