= Somebody New (album) =

Studio album by Rhett Akins
- Released: June 4, 1996
- Recorded: 1995–1996
- Studio: Ardent Studios, Memphis, TN, Javalina Studios, Sound Stage Studios, Nashville, TN
- Genre: Country
- Length: 31:50
- Label: Decca Nashville
- Producer: Mark Wright

Rhett Akins chronology
A Thousand Memories (1995)	Somebody New (1996)	What Livin's All About (1998)

Singles from Somebody New
- 1. "Don't Get Me Started" Released: March 26, 1996; 2. "Love You Back" Released: July 30, 1996; 3. "Every Cowboy's Dream" Released: December 10, 1996

Somebody New is the second studio album by American country music artist Rhett Akins. The album was released by Decca Nashville on June 4, 1996. Four singles were released from the album, including Akins' only number 1 single, "Don't Get Me Started", the number 38 "Love You Back" (his final Top 40 hit), as well as "Every Cowboy's Dream" and the title track.

"K-I-S-S-I-N-G" was previously released by co-writer Shawn Camp on his 1993 self-titled debut.

== Track listing ==
No.	Title	Writer(s)	Length
1.	"No Match (For That Old Flame)"	Rhett Akins; Larry Boone; Paul Nelson	4:03
2.	"Love You Back"	Bob DiPiero; Craig Wiseman	3:51
3.	"Somebody Knew"	Larry Bastian; Dean Dillon	3:05
4.	"K-I-S-S-I-N-G"	Shawn Camp; Herb McCullough	2:54
5.	"Don't Get Me Started"	Akins; Sam Hogin; Mark D. Sanders	3:22
6.	"Where Angels Live"	Mark Wright	3:18
7.	"Too Much Texas"	Chuck Jones; Chris Waters	2:42
8.	"Every Cowboy's Dream"	Akins; Randy Boudreaux; Kim Williams	2:14
9.	"Carolina Line"	Akins; Bruce Burch; Vern Dant	3:10
10.	"I Was Wrong"	Akins; Chris Gantry	3:11
Total length:			31:50

== Personnel ==
Compiled from liner notes.

Musicians

- Rhett Akins — lead vocals
- Mike Brignardello — bass guitar
- Larry Byrom — acoustic guitar
- Glen Duncan — fiddle, mandolin
- Stuart Duncan — fiddle, mandolin
- Paul Franklin — steel guitar
- Sonny Garrish — steel guitar
- Carl Gorodetzky — concertmaster
- Jennifer Hanson — background vocals
- Dann Huff — electric guitar, gut string guitar
- Liana Manis — background vocals
- Brent Mason — electric guitar
- Steve Nathan — keyboards
- Mac McAnally — acoustic guitar
- The Nashville String Machine — strings
- Tom Roady — percussion
- Matt Rollings — keyboards
- Brent Rowan — electric guitar
- John Wesley Ryles — background vocals
- Harry Stinson — background vocals
- Bergen White — string arrangements
- Dennis Wilson — background vocals
- Lonnie Wilson — drums
- Curtis Young — background vocals

Technical

- Chuck Ainlay — mixing
- Robert Charles — overdubbing
- John Hampton — mixing
- Warren Peterson — overdubbing
- Steve Tillisch — recording
- Hank Williams — mastering, digital editing
- Mark Wright — production

== Chart performance ==
Chart (1996)	Peak position
U.S. Billboard Top Country Albums	13
U.S. Billboard 200	102
U.S. Billboard Top Heatseekers	2
