= Friday Night in Dixie =

Studio album by Rhett Akins
- Released: March 26, 2002
- Recorded: 2001
- Genre: Country
- Label: Koch
- Producer: Rhett Akins, Charlie Daniels, Pat Hutchinson, Kenny Lamb

Rhett Akins chronology
What Livin's All About (1998)	Friday Night in Dixie (2002)	People Like Me (2007)

Alternative cover

Professional ratings
Review scores
Source	Rating
Allmusic	3.5/5 stars

Friday Night in Dixie is the fourth studio album by American country music artist Rhett Akins. It was released in 2002 on Audium Entertainment/Koch Records. The album produced two singles in "Highway Sunrise" and "In Your Love", which peaked at #55 and #57 respectively on the Billboard country singles charts. Also included is an acoustic rendition of Akins' 1995 single "That Ain't My Truck". The title track and "Must Be Livin' Right" were both re-recorded for his 2007 self-released album "People Like Me."

== Track listing ==
No.	Title	Writer(s)	Length
1.	"Highway Sunrise"	Kenny Lamb; Jeff Stevens	3:57
2.	"That Girl"	Rhett Akins; Kent Agee; Burton Banks Collins	3:17
3.	"She Was"	Akins; Lamb	3:51
4.	"In Your Love"	Lamb; Marv Green; Anthony Little	4:00
5.	"You Rock Me"	Akins; Ben Hayslip; Randy Albright	3:03
6.	"Friday Night in Dixie"	Akins; Charlie Daniels	3:27
7.	"White Lies and Blue Eyes"	Akins; Terry Clayton	3:56
8.	"Trouble With a Woman"	David Lee Murphy; Kim Tribble	3:31
9.	"Livin' Not Lovin' You"	Akins; Hayslip; Albright	4:28
10.	"Right Back Atcha"	Akins; Kendell Marvel; Max T. Barnes	3:31
11.	"I Wonder What You're Doin' Tonight"	Akins; Brett Beavers; Billy Burnette	4:02
12.	"Must Be Livin' Right"	Akins; Hayslip; Matt Hendrix	3:58
13.	"Where the Blacktop Ends"	Akins; Neil Thrasher	3:09
14.	"That Ain't My Truck" (Back Porch Acoustic Version)	Akins; Tom Shapiro; Chris Waters	3:57

== Personnel ==
- Rhett Akins - lead vocals
- Mike Brignardello - bass guitar
- Larry Byrom - acoustic guitar, electric guitar
- Dan Dugmore - electric guitar, steel guitar, slide guitar
- Glen Duncan - fiddle
- Tom Flora - background vocals
- John Gardner - percussion
- Brian Gary - Hammond organ
- Tony Harrell - Hammond organ, piano
- Steve Hinson - steel guitar
- Jeff King - banjo, electric guitar
- Troy Lancaster - electric guitar
- Anthony Little - programming
- Chris McHugh - drums
- Greg Morrow - drums, percussion
- Mike Noble - acoustic guitar
- Kim Parent - background vocals
- Darryl Preston - acoustic guitar, electric guitar
- Michael Rhodes - bass guitar
- Mike Rojas - keyboards
- W. David Smith - acoustic bass guitar
- Michael Spriggs - acoustic guitar
- Russell Terrell - background vocals
- Wanda Vick - banjo, fiddle, mandolin
- Charlie Whitten - dobro, lap steel guitar

== Chart performance ==
Chart (2002)	Peak position
U.S. Billboard Top Country Albums	65
