= FTK =

FTK may refer to:

- Forensic Toolkit, digital forensics software
- For the Kids (disambiguation)
- "Fuck the Kells", a song by American punk rock band Tijuana Sweetheart
- Godman Army Airfield, at Fort Knox, Kentucky, United States
