= With Me =

With Me may refer to:

- "With Me" (Destiny's Child song), a 1998 song by Destiny's Child
- "With Me" (Lonestar song), a 2001 song by Lonestar
- "With Me" (Sum 41 song), a 2008 song by Sum 41
