= What Livin's All About =

Studio album by Rhett Akins
- Released: January 13, 1998
- Recorded: 1997
- Studio: Loud Recording Studios, Nashville, TN
- Genre: Country
- Label: MCA Nashville
- Producer: James Stroud

Rhett Akins chronology
Somebody New (1996)	What Livin's All About (1998)	Friday Night in Dixie (2002)

Professional ratings
Review scores
Source	Rating
Allmusic	4/5 stars

What Livin's All About is the third studio album by American country music artist Rhett Akins. It was released in 1998 on MCA Nashville. The album accounted for two singles: "More Than Everything" and "Better Than It Used to Be", which respectively reached #41 and #47 on the Billboard country singles charts. It was also his only release for MCA. The track "I'll Be Right Here Lovin' You" was later released as a single by Randy Travis from his 1999 album A Man Ain't Made of Stone.

== Track listing ==
No.	Title	Writer(s)	Length
1.	"Better Than It Used to Be"	Mark D. Sanders; Neil Thrasher	3:10
2.	"Happy as We Wanna Be"	Tim Nichols; Sanders	2:45
3.	"More Than Everything"	Marv Green; Aimee Mayo	3:13
4.	"I'll Be Right Here Lovin' You"	Jeffrey Steele; T.W. Hale	3:00
5.	"Not in the Cards"	Tom Shapiro; Bob Regan	3:31
6.	"What Livin's All About"	Taylor Dunn; Danny Orton	3:22
7.	"She's Got Everything Money Can't Buy"	Steve Bogard; Greg Cook; Jeff Stevens	3:22
8.	"Ain't That Just Like a Woman"	Monty Criswell; Lee Thomas Miller	3:15
9.	"Dream the Rest"	Criswell; Brenda Sweat	3:39
10.	"Love Rules"	Nichols; Will Robinson	3:28
11.	"I'm Finding Out"	Thom McHugh; J.B. Rudd	3:01
12.	"The Rest of Forever"	Kent Blazy; Skip Ewing	4:46

== Personnel ==
- Rhett Akins- acoustic guitar, lead vocals
- Eddie Bayers- drums
- Mike Brignardello- bass guitar
- Larry Byrom- acoustic guitar
- J.T. Corenflos- electric guitar
- Stuart Duncan- fiddle
- Paul Franklin- steel guitar
- Sonny Garrish- steel guitar
- Brent Mason- electric guitar
- Steve Nathan- piano
- Michael Rhodes- bass guitar
- Matt Rollings- piano
- Russell Terrell- background vocals
- Kent Wells- electric guitar
- Curtis Young- background vocals

== Chart performance ==
Chart (1998)	Peak position
U.S. Billboard Top Country Albums	33
U.S. Billboard Top Heatseekers	20
