= A Thousand Memories =

Studio album by Rhett Akins
- Released: January 3, 1995
- Recorded: 1994
- Studios: Ardent Studios, Memphis, TN, Javalina Studios, Sound Stage Studios, Nashville, TN
- Genre: Country
- Length: 35:11
- Label: Decca Nashville
- Producer: Mark Wright

Rhett Akins chronology
A Thousand Memories (1995)	Somebody New (1996)

Professional ratings
Review scores
Source	Rating
Entertainment Weekly	C+
New Country	2/5 stars

A Thousand Memories is the debut studio album by American country music artist Rhett Akins. It was released on January 3, 1995, by Decca Records.

== Content ==
The album produced four chart singles on the Billboard country charts in "What They're Talkin' About" at number 35), "I Brake for Brunettes" at number 36, "That Ain't My Truck" at number 3, and "She Said Yes" at number 17.

Akins co-wrote all the tracks on this album except for "Katy Brought My Guitar Back Today", which was previously recorded by Alabama on their 1994 album Cheap Seats.

== Critical reception ==
Giving it 2 stars out of 5, Chris Dickinson of New Country described "What They're Talkin' About" as a "guilty pleasure" and compared it to Rick Springfield's "Jessie's Girl". He thought that Akins "has a knack for this sort of thing, but his ballads are harder to buy" due to his "youngish delivery". Entertainment Weekly reviewer Alanna Nash rated it C+, saying that Akins was "not quite ready for prime time" due to his age, and that his "life experience rarely goes beyond falling in love in the back of a Ford".

== Track listing ==
No.	Title	Writer(s)	Length
1.	"Heart to Heart"	Rhett Akins; Chris Gantry; Mac McAnally	3:51
2.	"What They're Talkin' About"	Akins; Larry Boone; Paul Nelson	3:27
3.	"Old Dirt Road"	Akins; Gantry	3:26
4.	"She Said Yes"	Akins; Joe Doyle	3:31
5.	"That Ain't My Truck"	Akins; Tom Shapiro; Chris Waters	4:03
6.	"Katy Brought My Guitar Back Today"	Mickey Cates; John Jarrard	3:05
7.	"A Thousand Memories"	Akins; Byron Hill	4:22
8.	"I Brake for Brunettes"	Akins; Sandy Ramos	3:23
9.	"Same Ol' Story"	Akins; Byron Hill	2:43
10.	"Those Hands"	Akins; Sam Hogin; Mark D. Sanders	3:27

== Personnel ==
As listed in liner notes.

- Rhett Akins – lead vocals, background vocals
- Barry Beckett – keyboards
- Mike Brignardello – bass guitar
- Glen Duncan – fiddle, mandolin
- Paul Franklin – steel guitar, Dobro
- B. James Lowry – acoustic guitar
- Mac McAnally – background vocals
- Steve Nathan – keyboards
- Brent Rowan – electric guitar
- John Wesley Ryles – background vocals
- Ricky Skaggs – background vocals
- Harry Stinson – background vocals
- Biff Watson – acoustic guitar
- Lonnie Wilson – drums
- Curtis "Mr. Harmony" Young – background vocals

Strings performed by the Nashville String Machine; Carl Gorodetzky, concertmaster.

String arrangement on "Katy Brought My Guitar Back Today" by Charles Cochran.

Strings on "Those Hands" and "She Said Yes" conducted and arranged by Bergen White.

== Chart performance ==
Chart (1995)	Peak position
U.S. Billboard Top Country Albums	45
U.S. Billboard Top Heatseekers	23
Canadian RPM Country Albums	23
