= One Thousand Memories =

One Thousand Memories may refer to:

- "One Thousand Memories", a 1999 song by the Caretaker from Selected Memories from the Haunted Ballroom
- "One Thousand Memories", a 2007 song by Sadist from Sadist

== See also ==
- A Thousand Memories, a 1995 album by Rhett Akins
