= Heartbroke Every Day =

Single by Lonestar

from the album Lonestar
- Released: December 7, 1996
- Genre: Country
- Length: 3:07
- Label: BNA
- Songwriters: Rick Vincent; Bill LaBounty; Cam King
- Producers: Don Cook; Wally Wilson

Lonestar singles chronology
| "When Cowboys Didn't Dance" (1996) | "Heartbroke Every Day" (1996) | "Come Cryin' to Me" (1997) |

"Heartbroke Every Day" is a song written by Rick Vincent, Bill LaBounty and Cam King. It first appeared on the 1994 self-titled album of the band Pearl River.

It was later recorded by American country music band Lonestar. Lonestar's version was released in December 1996 as the fifth and final single from the debut album Lonestar. The song reached number 18 on the Billboard Hot Country Singles & Tracks chart. It was also the only single of their career to feature then-member John Rich on lead vocals instead of Richie McDonald. Then, they reprised it again in 2010 with then-lead singer Cody Collins on lead vocals since McDonald left.

== Critical reception ==
A review in Billboard was favorable, praising the song for its "tasty guitar work", "virtually flawless production", and "bluegrass-inflected lead vocal".

== Chart performance ==
| Chart (1996–1997) | Peak position |
|---|---|
| Canada Country Singles (RPM) | 22 |
| US Hot Country Songs (Billboard) | 18 |
