= I'm Already There (song) =

2001 single by Lonestar

Single by Lonestar

from the album I'm Already There
- B-side: "Tell Her" (US) "Amazed" (Australia)
- Released: April 16, 2001
- Genre: Country pop
- Length: 4:13
- Label: BNA 69083
- Songwriters: Gary Baker; Richie McDonald; Frank J. Myers; David Zippel
- Producer: Dann Huff

Lonestar singles chronology
"Tell Her" (2000)	"I'm Already There" (2001)	"With Me" (2001)

Music videos
- "I'm Already There" on YouTube; "I'm Already There" (Message From Home) on YouTube

Alternative cover
- European Single Cover

"I'm Already There" is a song by American country music band Lonestar, written by lead singer Richie McDonald along with Gary Baker, Frank J. Myers and David Zippel. It was released on April 16, 2001, as the lead single from their fourth studio album of the same name. It spent six weeks at the top of the Billboard Hot Country Singles & Tracks chart. The song was the band's fifth consecutive Number One, and their seventh overall.

== Content ==
In the song, McDonald narrates about a man who is on the road, and the lyric explains how the man feels and how his family is responding to his absence. This also explains how much the man loves his family, and how much they mean to him. He then says that he will always be there for them in spirit, even though he is separated from them physically. McDonald stated that the song was inspired by a long-distance phone conversation he had with his then four-year-old son Brett in California in 2000 during the band's promotional tour for their album Lonely Grill, and that he wrote the song to cope with his separation from his family on the road. The song became associated with the September 11 attacks (even though it was released before the attacks) along with family members being deployed and returning from deployment, and has been heard many times on Good Morning America. Due to its tone and subject matter, "I'm Already There" is considered one of Lonestar's darker songs, alongside "Not a Day Goes By", their 2002 single revolving around breakups.

On their 2003 greatest-hits package From There to Here: Greatest Hits, Lonestar included a "Message from Home" version which included dubbed-in telephone calls placed by family members of soldiers. This version also lacks the line "And I'll gently kiss your lips / Touch you with my fingertips" from the second verse.

== Music video ==
The music video premiered to CMT on June 7, 2001, and was directed by Michael Salomon. On April 21, 2003, they released another version of the music video to recast the song as a tribute to the military. This version is the one that is most-played on TV. The band's performance was shot at Nashville's Union Station Hotel.

== Track listing ==
US vinyl 7" single

1. "I'm Already There" – 4:13
2. "Tell Her" – 3:36

US promo CD single

1. "I'm Already There" (Rhett Mix RES Short Intro) – 4:06
2. "I'm Already There" (Rhett Mix RES Vocal Up) – 4:14
3. "I'm Already There" (Rhett Mix RES Short Intro Vocal Up) – 4:12
4. "I'm Already There" (Huff's Stuff Guitar Down Mix) – 4:12
5. "I'm Already There" (Suggested Hook) – 0:10

UK CD single

1. "I'm Already There" (Huff Mix) – 4:12
2. "Every Little Thing She Does" – 3:13
3. "What About Now" (Remix) – 3:27

Australia CD single

1. "I'm Already There" (Single Version) – 4:11
2. "I'm Already There" (Album Version) – 4:13
3. "Amazed" – 4:02

== Critical reception ==
Andrea Dresdale of Rolling Stone cited the song as a standout track on the album, calling it "a finely detailed snapshot of everyday life that'll have anyone in a long distance relationship reaching for the Kleenex."

== Charts ==
=== Weekly charts ===
Chart (2001)	Peak position
US Hot Country Songs (Billboard)	1
US Adult Contemporary (Billboard)	2
US Billboard Hot 100	24
US Adult Pop Airplay (Billboard)	29

=== Year-end charts ===
Year-end chart performance for "I'm Already There"
Chart (2001)	Position
Canada Radio (Nielsen BDS)	51
US Hot Country Songs (Billboard)	5
Chart (2002)	Position
US Adult Contemporary (Billboard)	5

== Certifications ==
Region	Certification	Certified units/sales
United States (RIAA)	Gold	500,000^{^}
^{^} Shipments figures based on certification alone.

== Release history ==
Release dates and format(s) for "I'm Already There"
Region	Date	Format(s)	Label(s)	Ref.
United States	April 16, 2001	Country radio	BNA	
United States	September 3, 2001	Adult contemporary radio	BNA	
United States	September 10, 2001	Hot adult contemporary radio	BNA	
United States	late September 2001	Contemporary hit radio	BNA	
Australia	October 29, 2001	CD single	BNA	

== Westlife version ==
"I'm Already There"

Song by Westlife

from the album Back Home
- Released: December 2007
- Genre: Pop
- Length: 4:18
- Label: Sony BMG
- Songwriters: Gary Baker; Frank J. Myers; Richie McDonald; David Zippel
- Producers: Steve Mac; Quiz & Larossi

Audio video
- "I'm Already There" on YouTube

A cover of the song is the fourth track on the ninth studio album of Westlife, Back Home. It entered the UK download chart at No. 74 after "The Westlife Show" in December 2007. The song was not released as a single but peaked at No. 62 on the UK Singles Chart.

In 2008 on series 5 of The X Factor in the United Kingdom, JLS performed the Westlife version and it re-entered the UK chart at No. 106 and peaked at No. 63. It entered the official Irish Singles Chart at No. 47.

The song has been performed on four tours: The Back Home Tour (2008), The Where We Are Tour (2010), The Gravity Tour (2011) and The Wild Dreams Tour (2022).

Chart	Peak position
UK Singles Chart	62
UK Download Chart	74
Irish Singles Chart	47
