= I'm Already There =

Studio album by Lonestar
- Released: June 19, 2001
- Recorded: 2001
- Studio: Emerald Entertainment, Nashville; Soundshop, Nashville; Ocean Way, Nashville
- Genre: Country; pop; rock; adult contemporary
- Length: 45:32
- Label: BNA
- Producer: Dann Huff

Lonestar chronology
This Christmas Time (2000)	I'm Already There (2001)	From There to Here: Greatest Hits (2003)

Singles from I'm Already There
- 1. "I'm Already There" Released: March 26, 2001; 2. "With Me" Released: August 13, 2001; 3. "Not a Day Goes By" Released: January 21, 2002; 4. "Unusually Unusual" Released: August 19, 2002

Professional ratings
Review scores
Source	Rating
About.com	5/5 stars
Allmusic	3/5 stars
Country Weekly	(favorable)
Entertainment Weekly	C
Rolling Stone	(average)

I'm Already There is the fifth studio album by American country music band Lonestar. Released in 2001 on BNA Records (see 2001 in country music), the album was certified platinum by the RIAA for sales of one million copies.

Serving as singles from this album were the title track (which spent six weeks at Number One on the Hot Country Songs charts) "Not a Day Goes By" (#3 on Hot Country Songs), "With Me" (#10), and "Unusually Unusual" (#12).

== Track listing ==
All tracks produced by Dann Huff.

No.	Title	Writer(s)	Length
1.	"Out Go the Lights"	Brett Beavers; Steve Bogard; Richie McDonald	3:56
2.	"Unusually Unusual"	Mark McGuinn	3:36
3.	"Not a Day Goes By"	Maribeth Derry; Steve Diamond	4:08
4.	"I Want to Be the One"	Chuck Cannon; Gary Nicholson; Lari White	3:56
5.	"With Me"	Brett James; Troy Verges	3:53
6.	"Without You"	Anthony Smith; Bobby Terry	4:13
7.	"I'm Already There"	Gary Baker; McDonald; Frank J. Myers; David Zippel	4:13
8.	"Let's Bring It Back"	Annie Roboff; Jeffrey Steele	3:09
9.	"Must Be Love"	Greg Barnhill; Jon McElroy	3:14
10.	"Softly"	Holly Lamar; Roboff	4:06
11.	"Every Little Thing She Does"	Al Anderson; Bob DiPiero; Steele	3:13
12.	"Like a Good Cowboy"	Barnhill; Lamar	3:55
Total length:			45:32

Australian bonus track
No.	Title	Writer(s)	Length
13.	"No Greater Love"	Cannon; Stephen Allen Davis	3:40
Total length:			49:12

== Personnel ==
Lonestar

- Richie McDonald – lead vocals, keyboards, acoustic guitar
- Dean Sams – keyboards, acoustic guitar, harmonica, backing vocals
- Michael Britt – electric guitars, acoustic guitar, backing vocals
- Keech Rainwater – banjo, drums, percussion

Additional musicians

- Tim Akers – accordion, keyboards
- Matt Rollings – Hammond B3 organ, acoustic piano, keyboards
- Dann Huff – electric guitars
- Jerry McPherson – electric guitars
- B. James Lowry – acoustic guitar
- Biff Watson – acoustic guitar
- Paul Franklin – steel guitar, dobro
- Mike Brignardello – bass guitar
- Paul Leim – drums
- Chris McHugh – drums
- Wayne Killius – drum programming
- Eric Darken – percussion
- Larry Franklin – fiddle
- Aubrey Haynie – fiddle
- Jonathan Yudkin – fiddle, cello, mandolin
- Nashville String Machine – strings
- Ronn Huff – string arrangements and conductor
- Robbie Cheuvront – backing vocals

Production

- Dann Huff – producer
- Darrell Franklin – A&R direction
- Jeff Balding – recording, mixing
- Jed Hackett – mix assistant
- David Bryant – recording assistant
- Mark Capps – recording assistant
- Allen Ditto – recording assistant
- Greg Fogie – recording assistant
- Mark Hagen – recording assistant
- Ken Hertz – recording assistant
- Mike Konshak – recording assistant
- Jason Piske – recording assistant
- Christopher Rowe – digital editing
- Shawn Simpson – digital editing
- Doug Sax – mastering
- Robert Hadley – mastering
- The Mastering Lab (Hollywood, California) – mastering location
- Mike "Frog" Griffith – production coordinator
- Robert Sebree – photography
- Jennifer Kemp – wardrobe stylist
- Holly Ballard – grooming
- Cassie Roark – grooming
- Melissa Schleicher – grooming

== Chart performance ==
=== Weekly charts ===
Chart (2001)	Peak position
US Billboard 200	9
US Top Country Albums (Billboard)	1

=== Year-end charts ===
Year-end chart performance for I'm Already There
Chart (2001)	Position
Canadian Albums (Nielsen SoundScan)	133
Canadian Country Albums (Nielsen SoundScan)	9
US Billboard 200	152
US Top Country Albums (Billboard)	17

Chart (2002)	Position
Canadian Country Albums (Nielsen SoundScan)	20
US Billboard 200	173
US Top Country Albums (Billboard)	20

Chart (2003)	Position
US Top Country Albums (Billboard)	71

== Certifications ==
Region	Certification	Certified units/sales
Canada (Music Canada)	Gold	50,000^{^}
United States (RIAA)	Platinum	1,000,000^{^}
^{^} Shipments figures based on certification alone.
