= For the Kids =

For the Kids may refer to:

- The motto of Penn State Dance Marathon, often abbreviated "FTK"
- ...For the Kids, by Gym Class Heroes
- For the Kids (2002 album), a 2002 album by various artists
- For the Kids (EP), by John Rich
