= Rich Rocks =

EP by John Rich
- Released: May 17, 2011
- Genre: Country
- Length: 19:53
- Label: Warner Bros. Nashville
- Producers: John Rich; Adam Shoenfield

John Rich chronology
Son of a Preacher Man (2009)	Rich Rocks (2011)	For the Kids (EP) (2011)

Singles from Rich Rocks
- 1. "Country Done Come to Town" Released: July 6, 2010

Professional ratings
Review scores
Source	Rating
Allmusic	1/5 stars

Rich Rocks is the first extended play (or "Six Pak," as referred to on the album cover) by American country music artist John Rich, one half of the duo Big & Rich. Rich co-wrote all of the songs on the EP with the exception of "Let Somebody Else Drive", which is a John Anderson cover. On four of the six tracks, Rich is introduced by a friend that is also in the music industry. Originally slated for a late 2010 release, it was pushed back to May 17, 2011, to coincide with the release of John Rich's other EP, For the Kids. Reprise Records released both Rich Rocks and For the Kids.

The album includes the single "Country Done Come to Town", which charted at number 34 on Hot Country Songs.

== Track listing ==
No.	Title	Writer(s)	Length
1.	"Country Done Come to Town"	John Rich, Vicky McGehee	3:32
2.	"You Had Me from Hell No" (featuring Lil Jon)	Rich, Kylie Sackley	3:49
3.	"Mack Truck" (featuring Kid Rock)	Adam Shoenfeld, Rich	2:51
4.	"You Rock Me"	Shoenfeld, Rich	3:11
5.	"Texas" (featuring Cowboy Troy)	Shoenfeld, Rich	3:20
6.	"Let Somebody Else Drive" (featuring Hank Williams, Jr.)	Mack Vickery, Merle Kilgore	2:48
Total length:			19:53

== Personnel ==
- Paul Allen - electric guitar
- Mike Brignardello - bass guitar
- Cowboy Troy - vocals on "Texas"
- Chad Cromwell - drums
- Shannon Forrest - drums, drum loops
- Wes Hightower - background vocals
- Kid Rock - vocals on "Mack Truck"
- Lil Jon - vocals on "You Had Me from Hell No"
- Brent Mason - electric guitar
- John Rich - lead vocals
- Mike Rojas - Hammond B-3 organ, piano, synthesizer
- Adam Shoenfeld - electric guitar
- Jimmie Lee Sloas - bass guitar
- Joe Spivey - fiddle
- Ilya Toshinsky - banjo, acoustic guitar, resonator guitar
- Hank Williams Jr. - vocals on "Let Somebody Else Drive"
- Jonathan Yudkin - banjo, fiddle

== Chart performance ==
=== Album ===
Chart (2011)	Peak position
US Billboard Top Country Albums	35

=== Singles ===
Year	Single	Peak positions
Year	Single	US Country
2010	"Country Done Come to Town"	38
