= She Said Yes =

Single by Rhett Akins

from the album A Thousand Memories
- B-side: "Old Dirt Road"
- Released: October 9, 1995
- Recorded: 1994
- Genre: Country
- Length: 3:31
- Label: Decca Nashville
- Songwriters: Rhett Akins; Joe Doyle
- Producer: Mark Wright

Rhett Akins singles chronology
"That Ain't My Truck" (1995)	"She Said Yes" (1995)	"Don't Get Me Started" (1996)

"She Said Yes" is a song co-written and recorded by American country music artist Rhett Akins. It was released in October 1995 as the fourth and final single from his debut album A Thousand Memories. The song peaked at number 17 in the United States Billboard Hot Country Singles & Tracks chart and at number 20 on the RPM Country Tracks chart in Canada. It was written by Akins and Joe Doyle.

== Critical reception ==
Deborah Evans Price, of Billboard magazine reviewed the song favorably, saying that Akins "proves himself to be an able balladeer and insightful songwriter with this sweet ode to young love." She goes on to say that those "images of a boy and girl at a dance, taking those tentative first steps toward a relationship, draw the listener into the song."

== Music video ==
The music video was directed by Mary Newman-Said and premiered in late 1995. It features a couple at a high school dance, who eventually marry and grow old together.

== Chart performance ==
"She Said Yes" debuted at number 63 on the U.S. Billboard Hot Country Singles & Tracks for the week of October 21, 1995.

Chart (1995–1996)	Peak position
Canada Country Singles (RPM)	20
US Hot Country Songs (Billboard)	17
