= Mark McGuinn =

American singer-songwriter (1968–2026)

- Born: Mark Albert McGuinn; August 19, 1968
- Origin: Greensboro, North Carolina, U.S.
- Died: October 26, 2026 (aged 58)
- Genre: Country
- Occupation: Singer-songwriter
- Instruments: Vocals, guitar, piano, trumpet
- Years active: 2000–2002; 2006; 2011
- Labels: VFR, Blue Flamingo, Off Center

Mark Albert McGuinn (August 19, 1968 – October 26, 2026) was an American country music artist. He made his debut in 2001 with the single "Mrs. Steven Rudy", a Top 10 hit on the U.S. Billboard Hot Country Singles & Tracks charts. It was the first of three singles from his first album Mark McGuinn, which was released in 2001 on the independent VFR Records label. The label was closed in 2002, and McGuinn did not a record another album until One Man's Crazy in 2006, released on Blue Flamingo Records. He has not recorded an album since then.

== Biography ==
McGuinn was born in Greensboro, North Carolina. His musical background includes playing trumpet in a jazz band. McGuinn later aspired to become a professional soccer player. After a knee injury, he decided to move to Nashville, Tennessee, in 1994 to become a songwriter instead.

== Musical career ==
By 2001, McGuinn was signed to VFR Records, a newly formed independent record label, which released his first album, Mark McGuinn, in May that year. Initially, the label had planned to release "That's a Plan" as the album's first single. After a disc jockey at KPLX in Dallas, Texas, began playing "Mrs. Steven Rudy", another track from the album, other nearby stations soon followed suit. Due to the reaction the song was receiving in this market, the label released it as McGuinn's first single, with "That's a Plan" on the B-side.

Upon the release of "Mrs. Steven Rudy", McGuinn was considered a "dark horse" on the country music scene, due in part to his jazz background and beatnik image, which were considered outside the norms of country radio. "Mrs. Steven Rudy" was a top ten hit on the Billboard country music charts, and the highest-selling single on the country singles sales charts for five consecutive weeks. His album entered the Top Country Albums chart at number 18, setting a new record for the highest entry on that chart for the first release from an independent label. "That's a Plan" was eventually released as the second single, followed by "She Doesn't Dance". These songs peaked at numbers 25 and 29, respectively, on the country charts.

Rick Cohoon of Allmusic rated the album four stars out of five, saying that it "combines an entertaining musical arrangement with solid songwriting."

=== After first album ===
On the day of the September 11, 2001, attacks, McGuinn wrote and recorded a tribute song entitled "More Beautiful Today". He insisted that the song not be released to radio (although it did receive enough airplay to enter the country charts), and made it available only as a download on his website.

McGuinn also wrote a song entitled "Unusually Unusual", which was recorded by the country band Lonestar on their 2001 album I'm Already There. This song was released in late 2002 as a single, reaching number 12 on the country charts. Later that year, VFR declared bankruptcy, leaving McGuinn without a record deal. He then took a break to begin a family.

McGuinn returned to the studio in 2005 to record his second album, One Man's Crazy. It was released that year on Blue Flamingo Records, an independent label started by McGuinn and one of his co-writing partners, Jim Foster. "More Beautiful Today" was also reprised for this album. In 2008, George Jones released the single "You and Me and Time", which McGuinn co-wrote.

McGuinn died on October 26, 2026.

== Mark McGuinn (2001) ==
Mark McGuinn

Studio album by Mark McGuinn
- Released: May 8, 2001
- Recorded: 2000–01
- Genre: Country
- Length: 43:58
- Label: VFR
- Producers: Mark McGuinn, Shane Decker

Mark McGuinn chronology
Mark McGuinn (2001)	One Man's Crazy (2006)

=== Track listing ===
1. "Mrs. Steven Rudy" (Mark McGuinn, Shane Decker) – 3:29
2. "Heaven Must Be Missin' You" (McGuinn, Trey Matthews) – 3:41
3. "No Way" (McGuinn, Matthews) – 2:29
4. "That's a Plan" (Bobby Boyd, David Leone) – 3:26
5. "If the World Was Mine" (McGuinn, Decker) – 4:29
6. "One of Their Own" (McGuinn, Boyd) – 3:52
7. "She Doesn't Dance" (McGuinn, Don Pfrimmer, Decker) – 4:12
8. "Silver Platter" (McGuinn, Matthews) – 3:58
9. "All About the Ride" (McGuinn, Boyd, Billy Davidson) – 3:20
10. "Love Don't Float" (McGuinn, Jim Foster) – 3:38
11. "Busy Signal" (McGuinn, Matthews) – 4:28
12. "Done It Right" (McGuinn, Pfrimmer, Decker) – 3:04

=== Personnel ===
- Steve Bryant – bass guitar
- J. T. Corenflos – electric guitar
- Gary DiBenedetto – steel guitar
- Dan Dugmore – steel guitar
- Glen Duncan – fiddle
- Gary Hogue – steel guitar
- Don Kerce – bass guitar
- Wayne Killius – drums, drum loops, percussion
- Troy Lancaster – electric guitar
- Mark McGuinn – lead vocals, background vocals
- Dennis McCracken – background vocals
- Curt Ryle – acoustic guitar, background vocals
- Scott Sanders – steel guitar
- Wanda Vick – banjo, Dobro, fiddle, mandolin
- Dennis Wage – piano, keyboards

=== Chart positions ===
Chart (2001)	Peak position
US Top Country Albums (Billboard)	18
US Billboard 200	117
U.S. Billboard Top Independent Albums	2
U.S. Billboard Top Heatseekers	1

== One Man's Crazy (2006) ==
One Man's Crazy

Studio album by Mark McGuinn
- Released: July 4, 2006
- Recorded: 2006
- Genre: Country
- Length: 52:26
- Label: Blue Flamingo
- Producers: Mark McGuinn, Jim Foster, Don Kerce

Mark McGuinn chronology
Mark McGuinn (2001)	One Man's Crazy (2006)

=== Track listing ===
1. "One Man's Crazy" (Mark McGuinn, Don Pfrimmer) – 4:00
2. "115lbs" (M. McGuinn, Jim Foster) – 3:48
3. "Deep" (M. McGuinn, Pfrimmer) – 3:05
4. "Bring 'Em Back" (M. McGuinn, Stacey McGuinn) – 4:16
5. "Turtle" (M. McGuinn, Foster) – 3:31
6. "Better a Painful Ending" (M. McGuinn, Sharyn Lane) – 4:26
  - duet with Georgette Jones
7. "Trampoline" (M. McGuinn, John Reynolds) – 4:09
8. "Centreville" (M. McGuinn, Pfrimmer, Dennis McCraken) – 3:25
9. "Mona Lisa" (M. McGuinn, Trey Matthews) – 3:27
10. "Everest" (M. McGuinn, Pfrimmer) – 3:31
11. "Y" (M. McGuinn, Reynolds) – 2:47
12. "Wide Open" (M. McGuinn, Kevin Fisher) – 4:07
13. "Big Girl" (M. McGuinn) – 2:53
14. "More Beautiful Today" (M. McGuinn, Reynolds, Bill Davidson) – 5:01

=== Personnel ===
- Mark McGuinn – lead vocals, background vocals, acoustic guitar, electric guitar, Dobro, strings, mandolin, Wurlitzer electric piano, trumpet
- Jim Brown – piano, keyboards
- Bill Davidson – electric guitar, banjo
- Georgette Jones – background vocals ("Wide Open")
- Don Kerce – bass guitar, drum programming, cello, percussion
- Wayne Killius – drums, drum loops
- Jim Kimball – acoustic guitar
- Dennis McCracken – background vocals ("Wide Open")
- Russ Pahl – Dobro, electric guitar, steel guitar
- Danny Parks – electric guitar, slide guitar, 12-string guitar, baritone guitar, archtop guitar
- Brian Pruitt – drums, drum loops
- Wanda Vick – fiddle

== Singles ==
Year	Single	Peak chart positions		Album
Year	Single	US Country	US	Album
2001	"Mrs. Steven Rudy"	6	44	Mark McGuinn
2001	"That's a Plan"	25	—	Mark McGuinn
2002	"She Doesn't Dance"	29	—	Mark McGuinn
2002	"More Beautiful Today"	54	—	One Man's Crazy
2006	"Bring 'Em Back"	—	—	One Man's Crazy
2006	"One Man's Crazy"	—	—	One Man's Crazy
2006	"Deep"	—	—	One Man's Crazy
2006	"God Bless the Children" (with Wayne Warner and the Nashville All-Star Choir)	—	—	Turbo Twang'n
2011	"Til U Got Home"	—	—	single only
"—" denotes releases that did not chart

== Music videos ==
Year	Video	Director
2001	"Mrs. Steven Rudy"	David Abbott
2001	"That's a Plan"	David Abbott
2001	"She Doesn't Dance"	Eric Welch
