= Unusually Unusual =

Single by Lonestar

from the album I'm Already There
- Released: August 19, 2002
- Genre: Country pop
- Length: 3:36
- Label: BNA
- Songwriter: Mark McGuinn
- Producer: Dann Huff

Lonestar singles chronology
"Not a Day Goes By" (2002)	"Unusually Unusual" (2002)	"My Front Porch Looking In" (2003)

"Unusually Unusual" is a song written by Mark McGuinn and recorded by American country music group Lonestar. It was released in August 2002 as the fourth and final single from the album I'm Already There. It peaked at number 12 on the U.S. Billboard Hot Country Singles & Tracks chart.

== Content ==
In the song the narrator talks about how his significant other is "unusually unusual" because of the things she does. He talks about how her personality is beautiful to him.

== Chart positions ==
Chart (2002)	Peak position
US Hot Country Songs (Billboard)	12
US Billboard Hot 100	66
