= My Front Porch Looking In =

Single by Lonestar

from the album From There to Here: Greatest Hits
- Released: March 10, 2003
- Recorded: January 2003
- Genre: Country pop
- Length: 3:30
- Label: BNA
- Songwriters: Richie McDonald; Frank J. Myers; Don Pfrimmer
- Producer: Dann Huff

Lonestar singles chronology
"Unusually Unusual" (2002)	"My Front Porch Looking In" (2003)	"Walking in Memphis" (2003)

"My Front Porch Looking In" is a song written by Richie McDonald, Frank J. Myers and Don Pfrimmer, and recorded by American country music group Lonestar. It was released in March 2003 as the first single from the band's compilation album From There to Here: Greatest Hits. The song reached the top of the Billboard Hot Country Songs chart and peaked at number 23 on the Billboard Hot 100.

== Content ==
The song describes how the sight of his wife and two children is far better than anything including his "panoramic view" of his estate or "the paintings from the air, brushed by the hand of God." He also describes that after seeing the whole world, he "can't wait to get back home to the one He made for me."

== Music video ==
The music video was directed by Trey Fanjoy, and premiered on CMT on May 25, 2003. It features the band playing on a front porch of a bungalow house in the middle of a city. The video uses the single version of the song, which omits the piano introduction at the beginning of the album version but has a slightly longer ending than the album version.

== Chart positions ==
"My Front Porch Looking In" debuted at number 48 on the US Billboard Hot Country Singles & Tracks for the week of March 15, 2003.

=== Weekly charts ===
Chart (2003)	Peak position
US Hot Country Songs (Billboard)	1
US Billboard Hot 100	23

=== Year-end charts ===
Chart (2003)	Position
US Billboard Hot 100	68
US Country Songs (Billboard)	1

== Certifications ==
Region	Certification	Certified units/sales
United States (RIAA)	Gold	500,000^{^}
^{^} Shipments figures based on certification alone.
