= Runnin' Away with My Heart =

Single by Lonestar

from the album Lonestar
- B-side: "I Love the Way You Do That"
- Released: May 20, 1996
- Genre: Country
- Length: 3:30
- Label: BNA 64549
- Songwriters: Michael Britt; Sam Hogin; Mark D. Sanders
- Producers: Don Cook; Wally Wilson

Lonestar singles chronology
"No News" (1995)	"Runnin' Away with My Heart" (1996)	"When Cowboys Didn't Dance" (1996)

"Runnin' Away with My Heart" is a song recorded by American country music band Lonestar. It was released in May 1996 as the third single and fourth track from their self-titled debut album. It peaked at No. 8 on the Billboard Hot Country Songs chart in the United States, and at No. 9 in Canada. Michael Britt, the band's guitarist, co-wrote the song with Mark D. Sanders and Sam Hogin.

== Chart positions ==
"Runnin' Away with My Heart" debuted at number 73 on the U.S. Billboard Hot Country Singles & Tracks for the week of May 25, 1996.

Chart (1996)	Peak position
Canada Country Singles (RPM)	9
US Hot Country Songs (Billboard)	8

=== Year-end charts ===
Chart (1996)	Position
Canada Country Tracks (RPM)	90
US Country Songs (Billboard)	70
