= Don't Get Me Started =

Single by Rhett Akins

from the album Somebody New
- B-side: "I Was Wrong"
- Released: March 26, 1996
- Recorded: 1995
- Genre: Country
- Length: 3:22
- Label: Decca Nashville
- Songwriters: Rhett Akins; Sam Hogin; Mark D. Sanders
- Producer: Mark Wright

Rhett Akins singles chronology
"She Said Yes" (1995)	"Don't Get Me Started" (1996)	"Love You Back" (1996)

"Don't Get Me Started" is a song co-written and recorded by American country music artist Rhett Akins. It was released in March 1996 as the lead single from Akins' Somebody New album, it is also Akins' only number one hit on the Billboard Hot Country Songs. The song also peaked at number 3 on the RPM Country Tracks in Canada. Akins, Sam Hogin, and Mark D. Sanders wrote it.

== Critical reception ==
Deborah Evans Price, of Billboard magazine reviewed the song favorably saying that while the song had the potential to "descend into sticky sweetness", the "earnestness in Akins' vocals elevates the song and makes this a thoroughly enjoyable outing."

== Chart performance ==
"Don't Get Me Started" debuted at number 65 on the U.S. Billboard Hot Country Songs for the week of March 30, 1996. It spent 21 weeks on the Hot Country Songs charts.

Chart (1996)	Peak position
Canada Country Singles (RPM)	3
US Hot Country Songs (Billboard)	1

=== Year-end charts ===
Chart (1996)	Position
Canada Country Tracks (RPM)	95
US Country Songs (Billboard)	34
