= Son of a Preacher Man (John Rich album) =

Studio album by John Rich
- Released: March 24, 2009
- Genre: Country
- Length: 41:08
- Label: Warner Bros. Nashville
- Producer: John Rich

John Rich chronology
Underneath the Same Moon (2006)	Son of a Preacher Man (2009)	Rich Rocks (EP) (2011)

Singles from Son of a Preacher Man
- 1. "Another You" Released: January 12, 2009; 2. "Shuttin' Detroit Down" Released: January 28, 2009; 3. "The Good Lord and the Man" Released: June 29, 2009

Professional ratings
Review scores
Source	Rating
Allmusic	2/5 stars
Slant Magazine	0/5 stars

Son of a Preacher Man is the third solo studio album by American country music artist John Rich, one half of the duo Big & Rich. Rich wrote or co-wrote all of the songs on the album. Originally slated for a May 2009 release on Warner Bros. Records, the same label to which Big & Rich are signed, Son of a Preacher Man was released on March 24, 2009.

== Singles ==
=== "Another You" ===
The first single released from the album, "Another You", debuted on the Billboard Hot Country Songs chart at number 51 for the week of January 24, 2009. The song's chart run was supplanted by "Shuttin' Detroit Down", a last-minute addition to the album.

=== "Shuttin' Detroit Down" ===
"Shuttin' Detroit Down" was not originally planned to be included on Son of a Preacher Man. Rich co-wrote the song with fellow country singer John Anderson, and sent the song to radio in late January 2009, thus halting the chart run of "Another You". "Shuttin' Detroit Down" debuted at number 34 on the country charts, giving Rich his first solo Top 40 single of his career. It reached a peak of number 12 after nine weeks on the chart. After the release of "Shuttin' Detroit Down", the album's release date was moved up to March.

=== "The Good Lord and the Man" ===
"The Good Lord and the Man" is the third release to radio from Son of a Preacher Man. The single debuted at number 59 on the Hot Country Songs chart for the chart week of July 4, 2009. The single received a thumbs-down from Karlie Justus of Engine 145, who said, "Unfortunately, whatever authentic patriotism Rich conjures up in the opening verses is instantly discredited by the song’s uncomfortably off-putting chorus. Rich doesn’t effectively channel the emotions his grandfather’s service evokes within him and his phrasing and lyrics end up straining both rhythmically and logically to make his points." After a short chart run, it reached a peak of number 56.

== Track listing ==
All tracks are written by John Rich and Vicky McGehee unless otherwise noted.

No.	Title	Writer(s)	Length
1.	"Shuttin' Detroit Down"	John Anderson, Rich	4:01
2.	"Trucker Man"		3:09
3.	"The Good Lord and the Man"	Rich	3:38
4.	"Another You"	Marv Green, Rich	3:51
5.	"Preacher Man Land"		3:34
6.	"I Don't Wanna Lose Your Love"		3:42
7.	"Everybody Wants to Be Me"		3:27
8.	"Turn a Country Boy On"		3:19
9.	"Why Does Somebody Always Have to Die"	Rich	5:31
10.	"I Thought You'd Never Ask"	Anderson, Rich	3:28
11.	"Drive Myself to Drink"	McGehee, James Otto, Rich	3:28
Total length:			41:08

iTunes Bonus Tracks
No.	Title	Length
12.	"Hicktown" (acoustic)	3:57
13.	"Like We Never Loved at All" (acoustic)	4:58
14.	"Lost in This Moment" (acoustic)	4:11

== Personnel ==
- Max Abrams - saxophone
- Roy Agee - horn arrangements, trombone
- Larry Babb - drums
- Jimmy Bowland - flute
- Mike Brignardello - bass guitar
- Eric Darken - percussion
- Shannon Forrest - drums
- Wes Hightower - background vocals
- Mike Johnson - pedal steel guitar
- Liana Manis - background vocals
- Steve Patrick - trumpet
- Mark Petaccia - percussion
- Ethan Pilzer - bass guitar
- Danny Rader - acoustic guitar
- John Rich - lead vocals
- Mike Rojas - Hammond B-3 organ, piano, synthesizer
- Adam Shoenfeld - electric guitar
- John Willis - acoustic guitar
- Gretchen Wilson - background vocals
- Glenn Worf - bass guitar
- Jonathan Yudkin - banjo, cello, fiddle, mandolin, octophone, string bass, string arrangements, viola, violin

== Chart performance ==
=== Weekly charts ===
Chart (2009)	Peak position
US Billboard 200	16
US Top Country Albums (Billboard)	3

=== Year-end charts ===
Chart (2009)	Position
US Top Country Albums (Billboard)	54

=== Singles ===
Year	Single	Peak chart positions		
Year	Single	US Country	US	CAN
2009	"Another You"	45	—	—
2009	"Shuttin' Detroit Down"	12	75	95
2009	"The Good Lord and the Man"	56	—	—
