= Shuttin' Detroit Down =

Single by John Rich

from the album Son of a Preacher Man
- Released: January 28, 2009
- Recorded: January 2009
- Genre: Country
- Length: 4:01
- Label: Warner Bros. Nashville
- Songwriter(s): John Anderson; John Rich
- Producer(s): John Rich

John Rich singles chronology
"Another You" (2009)	"Shuttin' Detroit Down" (2009)	"The Good Lord and the Man" (2009)

Music video
- "Shuttin' Detroit Down" at CMT.com

"Shuttin' Detroit Down" is a song co-written and recorded by American country music singer John Rich, one half of the duo Big & Rich. The song addresses the issue of the government bailouts of financial institutions, and has received heavy rotation on Michigan radio stations, as well as others around the country. Rich recorded and released the song in January 2009, and it appears on his second solo album, Son of a Preacher Man. The album was released on March 24, 2009 on Warner Bros. Records Nashville, the same label to which Big & Rich is signed.

== Content ==
"Shuttin' Detroit Down" is a song which addresses the automotive industry crisis of 2008-2009, with a focus on the bailouts of financial institutions. Rich wrote the song in one hour along with country singer John Anderson, after watching the news. Anderson also recorded it on his 2009 album Bigger Hands.

== Promotion ==
Rich promoted the song at several radio stations in the state of Michigan, including WBCT in Grand Rapids, and both WDTW-FM, who no longer carries a country format, and WYCD in Detroit. According to the Grand Rapids Press, WDTW put the song into hourly rotation after its release and used it as its last song under its country format, and both Detroit country stations received several requests for the song upon its release. According to personnel at WYCD and WBCT, the song has been the subject of several phone calls and e-mails. A video of him performing the song at a New Jersey radio station has received more than 450,000 hits on YouTube.

== Critical reception ==
The song has received mixed reception from the media. Jon Caramanica, writing for the New York Times, said that the song "reflects not only Mr. Rich's songwriting gifts[…] but also his acumen in gauging and channeling the mood of the country, aggressively striking a note of conservative populism rarely seen in any genre of pop since country music's response to the 9/11." Country Standard Time critic Jeffrey B. Remz considered the song "ultra-timely" and said that Rich "gets his message across with a lot of twang."

Jim Malec, reviewing it for The 9513, gave it a "thumbs down" rating. He criticized the lyric for "spend[ing] most of its time attacking bankers" and otherwise being unsubstantial. He called Rich's voice "serviceable" and said that the melody and production were "engaging." AllMusic critic Stephen Thomas Erlewine, in his review of Son of a Preacher Man, said that the lyrics were the "lowest common denominator, pandering to an audience he's already won."

== Music video ==
A music video was issued for "Shuttin' Detroit Down," and it has aired on CMT and Great American Country. The video stars Kris Kristofferson and Mickey Rourke as workers at an automobile assembly plant affected by layoffs. The video was directed by Deaton-Flanigen Productions.

== Chart performance ==
On the chart week of February 14, 2009, "Shuttin' Detroit Down" debuted at number 34 on the Billboard Hot Country Songs charts. The song spent twelve weeks on that chart and peaked at number 12.

Chart (2009)	Peak position
Canada (Canadian Hot 100)	95
US Hot Country Songs (Billboard)	12
US Billboard Hot 100	75
