= Mrs. Steven Rudy =

Single by Mark McGuinn

from the album Mark McGuinn
- B-side: "That's a Plan"
- Released: January 22, 2001
- Recorded: 2000
- Genre: Country
- Length: 3:29
- Label: VFR
- Songwriters: Mark McGuinn; Shane Decker
- Producers: Mark McGuinn; Shane Decker

Mark McGuinn singles chronology
"Mrs. Steven Rudy" (2001)	"That's a Plan" (2001)

"Mrs. Steven Rudy" is a song co-written and recorded by American country music artist Mark McGuinn for his debut self-titled album. It was released as the album's first single in January 2001 and peaked at No. 6 on the U.S. country charts. It also reached No. 44 on the Billboard Hot 100. It was his highest peaking single and his only Top 20 single on the country charts. It was also McGuinn's only peaking single on the Hot 100. The song was the highest-selling single on the country singles sales charts for five consecutive weeks in mid-2001. The song marked the first time in over 40 years a new artist, on an independent label, had obtained at Top 10 hit. McGuinn wrote the song with Shane Decker.

Initially, McGuinn's debut single was to have been "That's a Plan," but after a disc jockey at KPLX in Texas began playing "Mrs. Steven Rudy," its large positive audience response prompted that song to be chosen as McGuinn’s first release instead.

== Personnel ==
Compiled from Mark McGuinn liner notes.

- Gary Hogue - steel guitar
- Don Kerce - bass guitar
- Wayne Killius - drums, drum loops
- Troy Lancaster - electric guitar
- Mark McGuinn - vocals
- Curt Ryle - acoustic guitar
- Wanda Vick - banjo
- Dennis Wage - piano
- Recorded and Mixed by - Jamie Tate
- Mastered by - Hank Williams

== Music video ==
The music video was directed by David Abbott.

== Chart performance ==
"Mrs. Steven Rudy" debuted as an official single at number 52 on the U.S. Billboard Hot Country Singles & Tracks for the chart week of February 3, 2001.

Chart (2001)	Peak position
US Hot Country Songs (Billboard)	6
US Billboard Hot 100	44

=== Year-end charts ===
Chart (2001)	Position
US Country Songs (Billboard)	45
