= That Ain't My Truck =

Single by Rhett Akins

from the album A Thousand Memories
- B-side: "Same Ol' Story"
- Released: May 1, 1995
- Recorded: 1994
- Genre: Country
- Length: 4:03
- Label: Decca Nashville
- Songwriters: Rhett Akins; Tom Shapiro; Chris Waters
- Producer: Mark Wright

Rhett Akins singles chronology
"I Brake for Brunettes" (1995)	"That Ain't My Truck" (1995)	"She Said Yes" (1995)

"That Ain't My Truck" is a song co-written and recorded by American country music artist Rhett Akins. It was released in May 1995 as the third single from his debut album A Thousand Memories. The song spent 21 weeks on the U.S. Billboard Hot Country Songs charts, peaking at number 3 in mid-1995. It also reached number 7 on the RPM Country Tracks chart in Canada. It was written by Akins, Tom Shapiro and Chris Waters.

== Content ==
The song is an up-tempo in which the narrator ends up on the losing end of a relationship. His significant other chooses another guy to continue a relationship with and the narrator knows this by driving by her house and seeing another man's truck in her driveway.

== Critical reception ==
Deborah Evans Price, of Billboard magazine reviewed the song favorably saying that the song "sounds like a winner".

== Music video ==
The music video was directed by Mary Newman-Said and premiered in mid 1995. The video was filmed around Tucson, Arizona.

== Chart performance ==
"That Ain't My Truck" debuted at number 65 on the U.S. Billboard Hot Country Singles & Tracks for the week of May 13, 1995.

Chart (1995)	Peak position
Canada Country Singles (RPM)	7
US Hot Country Songs (Billboard)	3

=== Year-end charts ===
Chart (1995)	Position
Canada Country Tracks (RPM)	80
US Country Songs (Billboard)	61
