= Not a Day Goes By =

Single by Lonestar

from the album I'm Already There
- B-side: "Unusually Unusual"
- Released: January 21, 2002
- Genre: Country pop
- Length: 4:08
- Label: BNA 69134
- Songwriters: Maribeth Derry; Steve Diamond
- Producer: Dann Huff

Lonestar singles chronology
"With Me" (2001)	"Not a Day Goes By" (2002)	"Unusually Unusual" (2002)

"Not a Day Goes By" is a song written by Maribeth Derry and Steve Diamond, and recorded by American country music band Lonestar. It was released in January 2002 as the third single from their 2001 album, I'm Already There. The song reached the Top 5 on the Billboard Hot Country Singles & Tracks chart.

== Content ==
The narrator discusses a breakup and states that he thinks about his ex every day.

Due to its tone and subject matter, "Not a Day Goes By" is considered one of Lonestar's darker songs, alongside "I'm Already There", their 2001 single revolving around family separation.

== Music video ==
The music video was directed by Lawrence Carroll and premiered in early 2002.

== Chart performance ==
"Not a Day Goes By" debuted at number 58 on the U.S. Billboard Hot Country Singles & Tracks for the week of January 26, 2002.

Chart (2002)	Peak position
US Hot Country Songs (Billboard)	3
US Billboard Hot 100	36

=== Year-end charts ===
Chart (2002)	Position
US Country Songs (Billboard)	18
