= Tequila Talkin' =

Single by Lonestar

from the album Lonestar
- B-side: "No News"
- Released: August 7, 1995
- Recorded: 1995
- Genre: Country
- Length: 3:24
- Label: BNA 64386
- Songwriters: Bill LaBounty; Chris Waters
- Producers: Don Cook; Wally Wilson

Lonestar singles chronology
| "Tequila Talkin'" (1995) | "No News" (1996) |

"Tequila Talkin'" is the debut single by American country music band Lonestar, released in August 1995 from their self-titled debut album. The song was written by Bill LaBounty and Chris Waters. It peaked at number 8 in the United States and at number 11 in Canada.

== Content ==
The song's narrator was drunk on tequila when he told his former lover that he was still in love with her, though he was not.

== Critical reception ==
Larry Flick, of Billboard magazine reviewed the song favorably, calling it a "great country lyric about longing and regret magnified through a bottle". He went on to say that "nice vocal and solid production make this accessible to radio". Rick Mitchell criticized the song in his review of the album, saying that it seemed derivative of the Eagles' "Tequila Sunrise".

== Chart positions ==
"Tequila Talkin" entered the U.S. Billboard Hot Country Singles & Tracks at 69 for the week of August 19, 1995. The commercial single release, a double A-side with "No News", reached number 22 on the Bubbling Under Hot 100.

| Chart (1995) | Peak position |
|---|---|
| Canada Country Singles (RPM) | 11 |
| US Hot Country Songs (Billboard) | 8 |
