= For the Kids (EP) =

EP by John Rich
- Released: May 17, 2011
- Genre: Country
- Length: 23:01
- Label: Warner Bros. Nashville
- Producer: John Rich

John Rich chronology
Rich Rocks (EP) (2011)	For the Kids (2011)

For the Kids is the second Extended Play (or "Six Pak," as referred to on the album cover) by American country music artist John Rich, one half of the duo Big & Rich. Rich contributed to the writing of three of the six total tracks. The EP was released on May 17, 2011, coinciding with the release of John Rich's other EP, Rich Rocks. Reprise Records released both For the Kids and Rich Rocks. The songs "She's a Butterfly" and "Rescue Me" were originally recorded by Rich for his 2001 solo album Rescue Me.

== Track listing ==
No.	Title	Writer(s)	Length
1.	"For the Kids"	John Rich	3:31
2.	"Thank God for Kids"	Eddy Raven	2:44
3.	"Where Angels Hang Around"	James Otto, Monty Criswell	4:11
4.	"She's a Butterfly"	Big Kenny, Rich	4:10
5.	"Simplify"	Big Kenny, Brian Wayne Galentine, Rich	3:40
6.	"Rescue Me"	Katherine Darnell	4:21
Total length:			23:01

== Personnel ==
- Steve Brewster - drums
- Dennis Burnside - keyboards
- Shannon Forrest - drums
- Larry Franklin - fiddle, mandolin
- Owen Hale - drums
- Mike Johnson - steel guitar
- Doug Kahan - bass guitar
- Brent Mason - electric guitar
- Greg Morrow - drums
- Duncan Mullins - bass guitar
- Matt Pierson - bass guitar
- John Rich - acoustic guitar, lead vocals, background vocals
- Jeff Roach - keyboards
- Mike Rojas - keyboards
- Adam Shoenfeld - electric guitar
- Joe Spivey - fiddle
- Bobby Terry - acoustic guitar
- Ilya Toshinsky - acoustic guitar
- Sharon Vaughn - background vocals
- Glenn Worf - bass guitar
- Jonathan Yudkin - strings

== Chart performance ==
Chart (2011)	Peak position
US Billboard Top Country Albums	40
US Billboard Top Kid Audio	7
