= No News =

Single by Lonestar

from the album Lonestar
- A-side: "Tequila Talkin'"
- Released: January 8, 1996
- Recorded: 1994
- Genre: Country rock
- Length: 2:53
- Label: BNA
- Songwriters: Phil Barnhart; Sam Hogin; Mark D. Sanders
- Producers: Don Cook; Wally Wilson

Lonestar singles chronology
"Tequila Talkin'" (1995)	"No News" (1996)	"Runnin' Away with My Heart" (1996)

"No News" is a song recorded by American country music band Lonestar. It was released in January 1996 as the second single from their debut album, Lonestar. "No News" reached the top of the Billboard Hot Country Singles & Tracks chart in April 1996, giving the group its first number-one single. It was written by Phil Barnhart, Sam Hogin, and Mark D. Sanders.

== Content ==
The song's narrator tells of how his former lover has left him and disappeared without a trace. Having heard "no news" from her or her family on her whereabouts, he starts to speculate. Multiple scenarios are offered such as missing her plane, getting lost at the mall, touring with Pearl Jam, the Grateful Dead or Jimmy Buffett, victim of human sacrifice or alien abduction and believes the government may be covering it up. The single version and updated 2023 version replaced the line "Joined the cult, joined the Klan" with "playin' guitar with the band".

== Critical reception ==
Deborah Evans Price, of Billboard magazine reviewed the song favorably, calling it "different, catchy, and utterly infectious." She goes on to say that the production is "first-rate" and that the performance is "right on the mark."

== Music video ==
This was the band's first music video, and it was directed by Deaton-Flanigen Productions. The video premiered on CMT on January 20, 1996, when CMT named it a "Hot Shot". It begins following the narrative of the song as the woman leaves her boyfriend and boards a bus. While on the bus, the previously conservatively-dressed woman begins letting her hair down and dancing provocatively, causing such a stir that the bus overheats and breaks down. She then hitchhikes with a Boss Hogg-like character who pulls up in a Cadillac convertible; he and the woman ride off into the sunset. Meanwhile, the boyfriend sits at home, and he keeps asking the woman's mother and sister for any clues as to her whereabouts, to no avail. Scenes also feature the band performing the song outside. A portion of their debut single "Tequila Talkin'" was played at the beginning of the video.

== Chart positions ==
"No News" debuted at number 57 on the U.S. Billboard Hot Country Singles & Tracks for the week of January 13, 1996. The song was commercially released as a double A-side with the band's debut single "Tequila Talkin'"; this double-sided single reached number 22 on the Bubbling Under Hot 100.

Chart (1996)	Peak position
Canada Country Singles (RPM)	1
US Bubbling Under Hot 100 (Billboard)	22
US Hot Country Songs (Billboard)	1

=== Year-end charts ===
Chart (1996)	Position
Canada Country Tracks (RPM)	54
US Country Songs (Billboard)	10
