= Rick Vincent =

American singer-songwriter

- Origin: San Bernardino, California, United States
- Genres: Country
- Occupation: Singer-songwriter
- Instruments: Vocals; guitar
- Years active: 1993–1996
- Label: Curb

Rick Vincent is an American country music artist. Signed to Curb Records in 1992, Vincent released his debut album, A Wanted Man, the following year and had two singles on the Billboard country chart. The album and its two singles remain Vincent's only contributions as a recording artist.

Vincent moved to Nashville, Tennessee in 1989 to pursue his musical career. After songwriter and producer Wendy Waldman discovered one of his demo tapes, he signed to Curb Records in 1992. His lone Curb album, A Wanted Man, charted two singles: "The Best Mistakes I Ever Made" and "Ain't Been a Train Through Here in Years". The album received a positive review from Brian Mansfield of Allmusic, who said that Vincent "writes thoughtful and literate lyrics" while praising Vincent's singing voice. Similarly, a review in the Pittsburgh Post-Gazette praised Vincent's lyricism and influence from the Bakersfield sound, while also noting his "strong, rich baritone". A third single from the album, "Hello, She Lied", did not chart, and Vincent never recorded again. However, he co-wrote the song "Heartbroke Every Day", a top 20 country hit for Lonestar in 1996.

== Discography ==
=== A Wanted Man (1993) ===
A Wanted Man

Studio album by Rick Vincent
- Released: January 12, 1993
- Recorded: 1992
- Genre: Country
- Length: 33:08
- Label: Curb
- Producer: Wendy Waldman; Brad Parker

=== Track listing ===
1. "The Best Mistakes I Ever Made" (Vincent) – 3:01
2. "Hello, She Lied" (Vincent, Will Jennings) – 2:54
3. "When the Smoke Clears" (Vincent, Brad Parker) – 3:45
4. "Ain't Been a Train Through Here in Years" (Vincent, Steve Hill) – 3:17
5. "You're Not in This Alone" (Vincent, Tim Lancaster) – 2:30
6. "Outlaw Heart" (Vincent, Kevin Ball) – 3:30
7. "A Wanted Man" (Vincent, Rick West, Bill Shore) – 2:47
8. "Cottonwood Creek" (Vincent) – 2:48
9. "'Round the Honky Tonk Bend" (Vincent, Ball) – 4:17
10. "San Joaquin" (Vincent) – 4:19

=== Personnel ===
From A Wanted Man liner notes.

Musicians

- Eddie Bayers – drums
- Karla Bonoff – background vocals
- Sam Bush – mandolin
- Jerry Douglas – Dobro
- Dan Dugmore – steel guitar
- Kenny Edwards – mandolin, background vocals
- Steve Gibson – electric guitar, acoustic guitar, mandolin
- Andrew Gold – background vocals
- Rob Hajacos – fiddle
- Sid Page – fiddle
- Brad Parker – electric guitar
- Gary Prim – piano
- Michael Rhodes – bass guitar
- Brent Rowan – electric guitar
- Rick Vincent – acoustic guitar, lead and background vocals
- Wendy Waldman – acoustic guitar, background vocals
- Willie Weeks – bass guitar

Technical

- Steve Hall – mastering
- Brad Parker – assistant producer
- Dennis Ritchie – recording, mixing
- Wendy Waldman – producer

=== Singles ===
Year	Single	Peak chart positions		Album
Year	Single	US Country	CAN Country	Album
1992	"The Best Mistakes I Ever Made"	39	49	A Wanted Man
1993	"Ain't Been a Train Through Here in Years"	69	—	A Wanted Man
1993	"Hello, She Lied"	—	—	A Wanted Man
"—" denotes releases that did not chart

=== Music videos ===
Year	Title	Director
1992	"The Best Mistakes I Ever Made"	
