= Sam Hogin =

American songwriter

- Also known as: S. Hogin
- Born: Samuel Harper Hogin; March 6, 1950; Bruceton, Tennessee, United States
- Died: August 9, 2004 (aged 54)
- Genres: Country
- Occupation: Songwriter
- Years active: 1971-2004

Samuel Harper Hogin (March 6, 1950 – August 9, 2004) was an American country music songwriter. Hogin was nominated for the Country Music Association's Song of the Year award in 1981 for "I Believe in You" (co-written with Roger Cook) and in 1998 for "A Broken Wing" (co-written with James House and Phil Barnhart).

== Songs (written or cowritten) ==
- "Anything for Love" (performed by James House)
- "A Broken Wing" (performed by Martina McBride)
- "Crazy from the Heat" (performed by Lorrie Morgan)
- "Dance with the One That Brought You" (performed by Shania Twain)
- "Don't Get Me Started" (performed by Rhett Akins)
- "Gettin' Even" (performed by John Schneider)
- "I Believe in You" (performed by Don Williams)
- "I Don't Know How Not to Love You" (performed by Nikki Nelson)
- "I Want to Be Loved Like That" (performed by Shenandoah)
- "If You Don't Love Me by Now" (performed by Eloise Laws)
- "Livin' in These Troubled Times" (performed by Crystal Gayle)
- "No News" (performed by Lonestar)
- "Rough and Tumble Heart" (performed by Highway 101 and Pam Tillis)
- "Runnin' Away with My Heart" (performed by Lonestar)
- "Sawmill Road" (performed by Diamond Rio)
- "Thanks to You" (performed by John Denver)
- "Too Many Lovers" (performed by Crystal Gayle)
- "Walking to Jerusalem" (performed by Mark D. Sanders)
- "What I Meant to Say" (performed by Wade Hayes)
