= John Rich =

American country musician (born 1974)

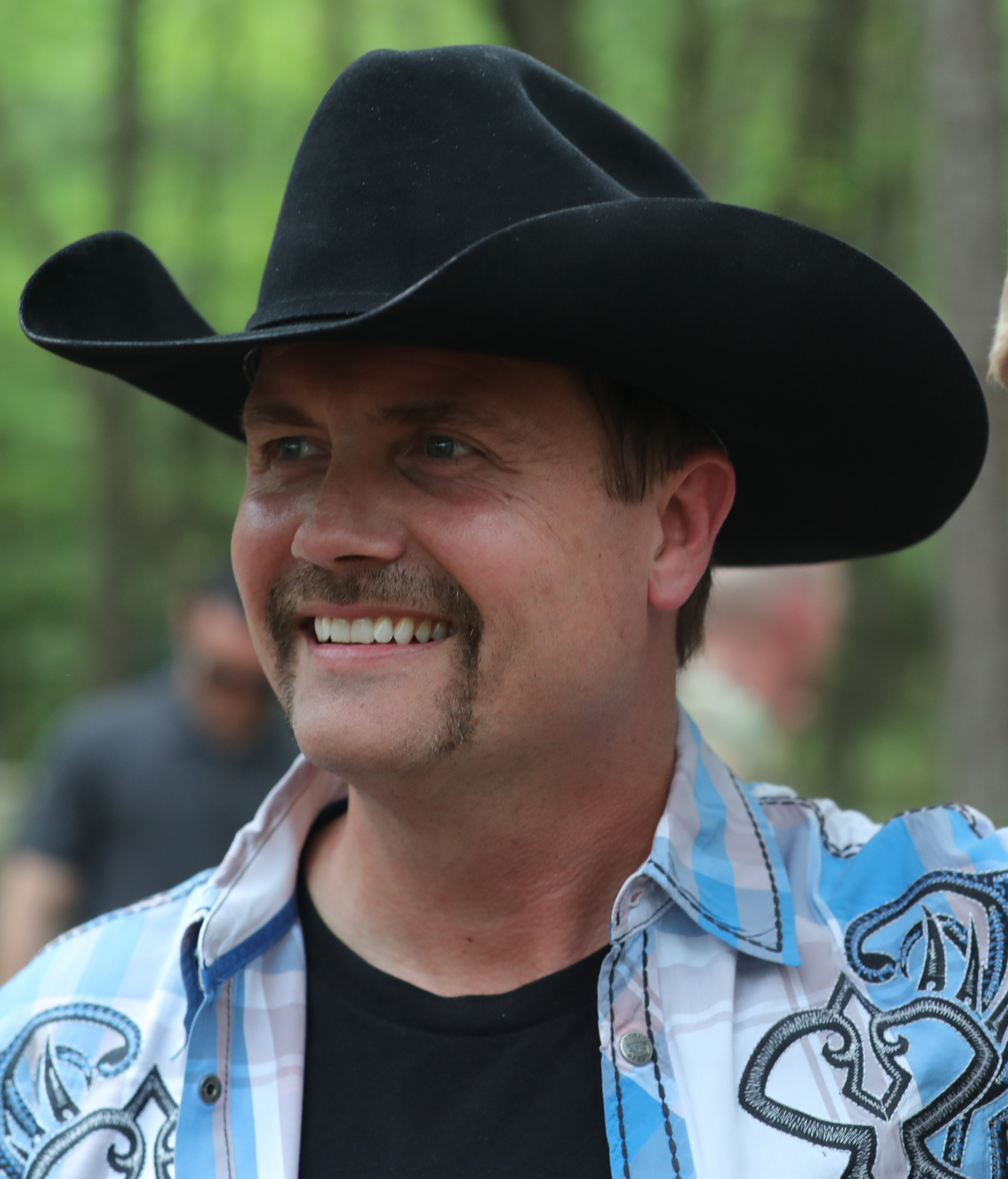
- Rich in 2022

United States Special Envoy for American Landowners
- Incumbent
- Assumed office July 10, 2026
- President: Donald Trump
- Preceded by: Position established

Personal details
- Born: January 7, 1974 (age 52) Amarillo, TX
- Party: Republican
- Spouse: Joan Bush (m. 2008)
- Musical career
- Genre: Country
- Occupations: Singer-songwriter, record producer, owner of Redneck Riviera.
- Instruments: Vocals, bass guitar, guitar
- Years active: 1992–present
- Labels: BNA, Warner Bros. Nashville, Reprise
- Member of: Big & Rich
- Formerly of: Lonestar
- Website: johnrich.com

John Rich (born January 7, 1974) is an American country music singer-songwriter.

From 1992 to 1998, he was a member of the country band Lonestar, in which he played bass guitar and alternated with Richie McDonald as lead vocalist. After departing from the band in 1998, he embarked on a solo career on BNA Records in the late 1990s, releasing two singles for the label and recording Underneath the Same Moon, which was not released until 2006. In 2001, he self-released Rescue Me, an album he was inspired to record by a cancer patient named Katie Darnell.

By 2003, he joined Big Kenny to form the duo Big & Rich, who released three albums on Warner Bros. Records as well as ten singles, including the Number One "Lost in This Moment". After Big & Rich went on hiatus in 2007, Rich began work on a third solo album, Son of a Preacher Man, which has produced two more chart singles. In 2011, Rich released two extended plays, Rich Rocks and For the Kids, before re-establishing Big & Rich in 2012.

In 2026, President Donald Trump appointment Rich to be the United States Special Envoy for American Landowners. He was sworn into the position on July 10, 2026.

== Music career ==
=== Lonestar ===
John Rich was born on January 7, 1974, the son of Jim, a Baptist preacher, and Judy Overton Rich. John graduated from Dickson County Senior High in Dickson, Tennessee, and after graduation moved to Nashville where he worked as a singer at Opryland USA. He wanted to be a professional team roper. Not long after, he met up with the group Texasee, which eventually changed its name to Lonestar. While in Lonestar, Rich was the bass guitarist and co-lead vocalist with Richie McDonald. Their 1996 single "Heartbroke Every Day" was the only one to feature Rich on lead vocals. Rich also co-wrote two of the band's singles: "Come Cryin' to Me" and "Say When", the former being a number-one single for the group. In January 1998, Rich departed from Lonestar, but was never officially replaced, causing Lonestar to continue as a four-piece band. Afterward, Rich became a solo artist with BNA Records, the same label to which Lonestar was signed. He charted two singles for the label and recorded an album which did not see release until 2006. In 2001, he recorded and self-released Rescue Me, an album he was inspired to record after meeting cancer patient Katie Darnell.

=== Big & Rich ===
Rich joined Big Kenny in 2002 to form the duo Big & Rich. The duo recorded three studio albums for Warner Bros. Records: Horse of a Different Color, Comin' to Your City and Between Raising Hell and Amazing Grace, in 2004, 2005 and 2007 respectively. These albums accounted for ten singles on the country charts, including the Number One "Lost in This Moment". Rich also co-wrote all of the duo's singles, primarily with Big Kenny. In the wake of Big & Rich's success, his 1999 solo album Underneath the Same Moon was issued via BNA, coinciding with the release of Big Kenny's previously unreleased solo album Live a Little. A fourth Big & Rich studio album was released in the summer of 2012, with the inspiring "That's Why I Pray" reaching No. 15 on the country charts.

=== Work for other artists ===
During Big & Rich's success, Rich also worked as a songwriter and producer for other artists. His work included production for Gretchen Wilson, Keith Anderson, Jewel and John Anderson. In the same time span, he co-wrote multiple singles for other artists, including the Number One hits "Redneck Woman" for Wilson, "Mississippi Girl" for Faith Hill and "Why" for Jason Aldean.

He also has a co-write on Taylor Swift's 2008 album Fearless, titled "The Way I Loved You".

In 2011, Rich recorded a song with heavy metal band Black Label Society, entitled "Darkest Days", featured on their compilation album, The Song Remains Not the Same.

In 2016, Rich added his voice to a duet with Marie Osmond on her album Music Is Medicine with the song titled "Love This Tough".

=== Son of a Preacher Man ===
In January 2009, Rich released his third solo single on Warner Bros. Records. The song, "Another You", is the lead-off single to Rich's second studio album, Son of a Preacher Man, which was released on March 24, 2009. He followed this song up with another single, "Shuttin' Detroit Down", recorded only one week before its release in January 2009. Rich promoted the song, which addresses the Chrysler and General Motors bailouts, at Michigan radio stations. The song debuted at No. 34 on the Billboard Hot Country Songs chart for the chart week of February 14, 2009, becoming his first solo Top 40 hit and peaking at No. 10 in April. A third single, "The Good Lord and the Man", debuted at No. 59 on the country chart and peaked at No. 56 in July 2009.

=== Rich Rocks and For the Kids ===
Both Rich Rocks and For the Kids have only produced one single between them. Country Done Come to Town was released as a single from Rich Rocks in mid-2010 and was a minor chart success.

== Television work ==
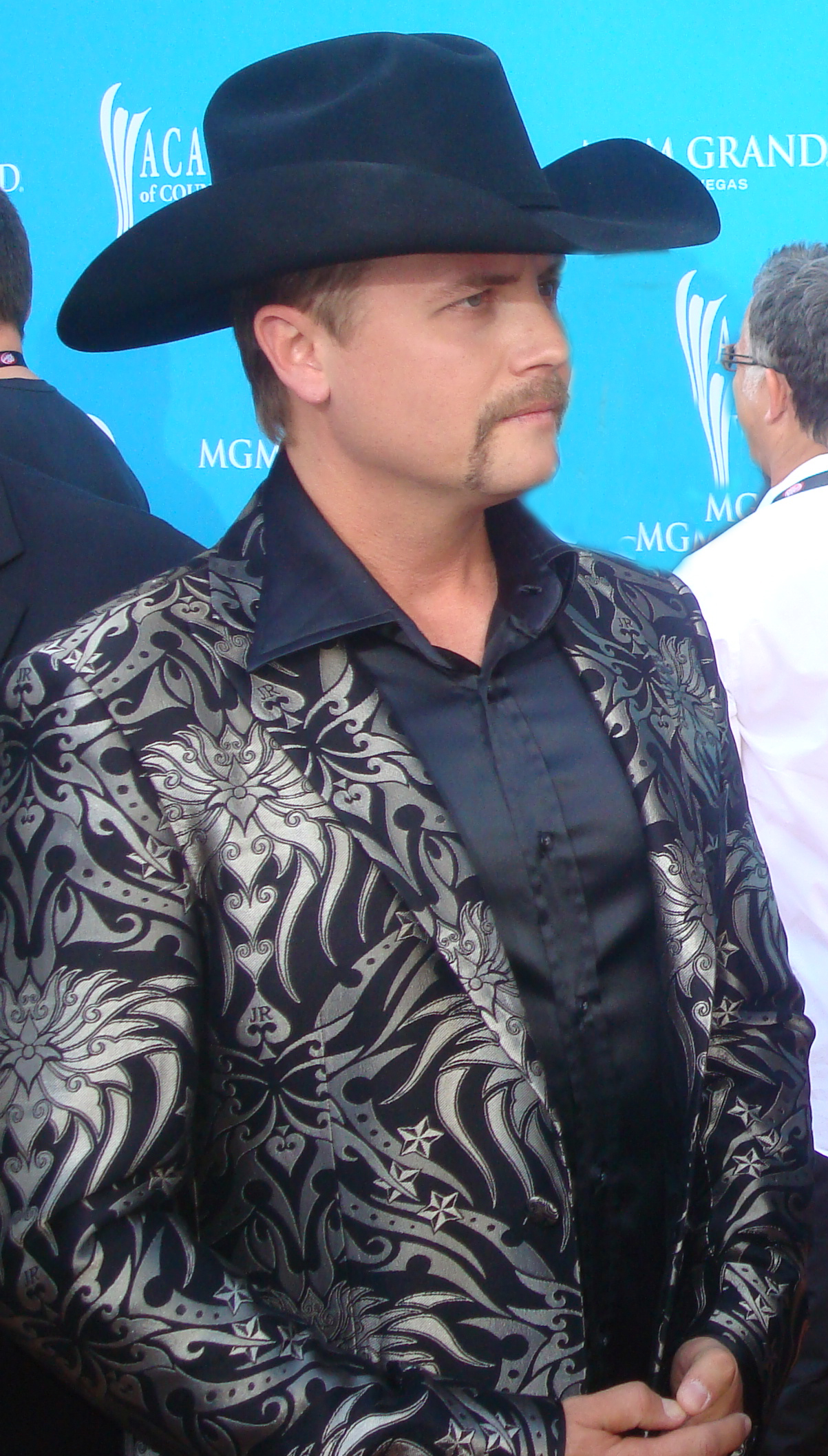
Rich in 2010

In 2007, Rich hosted the first season of a reality show on Country Music Television called Gone Country, which featured celebrities such as Brady Bunch actress Maureen McCormick, singers Bobby Brown, Sisqo, Julio Iglesias Jr., Dee Snider, Carnie Wilson and American Idol runner-up Diana DeGarmo as they try to become songwriters with the help of Nashville songwriters as the celebrities are paired together with the songwriters. The show was filmed at the former home of Barbara Mandrell. He has hosted two more seasons since then.

Rich also served as a judge on the 2008 version of Nashville Star on NBC along with Jewel, singer-songwriter Jeffrey Steele, and host Billy Ray Cyrus.

Rich was a candidate in the 2011 season of The Celebrity Apprentice, which premiered on March 6. In episode 5, he lost as Project Manager for the men's team, Backbone. Despite the first loss, he later won 2 more tasks as Project Manager, raising $1,266,908 for St. Jude Children's Research Hospital. Rich competed with Marlee Matlin in the live season finale, where he was declared the season winner, and received an additional $250,000 for his charity.

Rich served as a mentor in the 2012 reality/competition series The Next: Fame Is at Your Doorstep.

== Personal life ==
John Rich and his wife, Joan, married on December 6, 2008. He has two sons, Cash and Colt. Rich is an outspoken Christian and credits his faith for his decision to withdraw from the mainstream music industry in favor of a more independent music career.

=== Political views ===
Rich is a strong supporter of the Republican Party. In the 2008 U.S. presidential race, Rich originally supported Fred Thompson. He performed in the closing ceremony of the Republican National Convention on September 3, 2008. He endorsed Donald Trump for president in 2016, 2020 and 2024. On April 7, 2015, Rich's song "Shuttin' Detroit Down" was featured in Senator Rand Paul's 2016 presidential campaign announcement. He later declared his support for presumptive nominee Donald Trump following Paul's exit from the race. Big & Rich would later perform at a pre-inaugural ceremony on January 19, 2017, after Trump's victory in the general election. On May 30, 2019, he released "Shut Up About Politics" featuring presenters of the Fox News Channel program The Five.

In July 2022, Rich released the politically charged "Progress", a song harshly condemning various "progressive" political ideologies. "Progress" reached No. 1, and stayed there for two consecutive weeks on the all-genre iTunes download chart. The following year, he released the similarly political song "I'm Offended". In April 2023, Rich expressed support for the Bud Light boycott, announcing that he would no longer sell Anheuser-Busch products at his bar. In 2026, Rich made a post on the social media platform X advocating the use of the U.S. military to release Tina Peters, who was convicted in August 2024 on seven charges of engaging in a security breach to advance a false conspiracy theory of election fraud from custody in Colorado. Four of the convictions were for felonies.

== Special Envoy for American Landowners (2026–present) ==
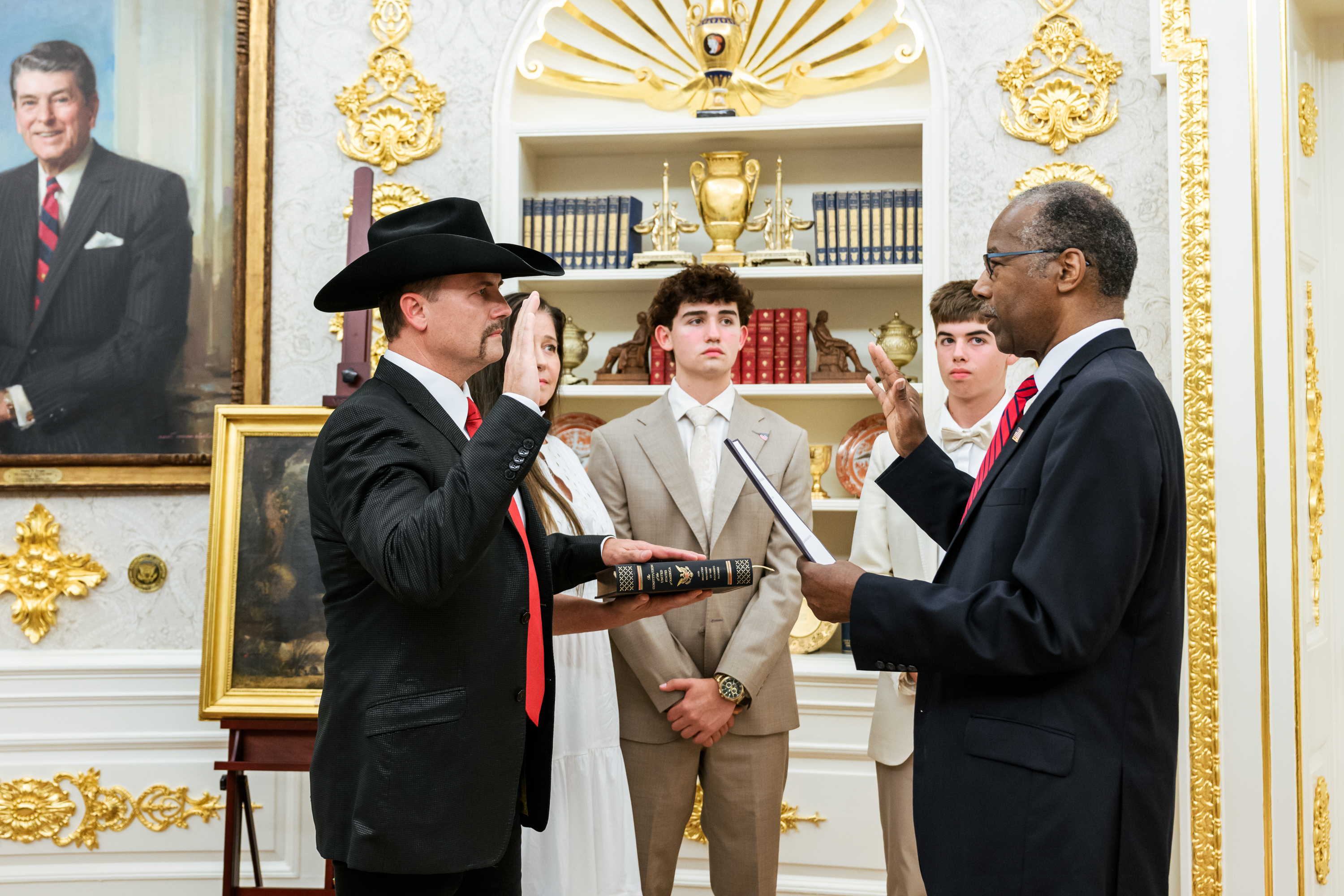
Rich being sworn in as United States Special Envoy for American Landowners on July 10, 2026

Rich was sworn in as the United States Special Envoy for American Landowners under the administration of President Donald Trump on July 10, 2026.

== Discography ==
=== Studio albums ===
Title	Details	Peak chart positions	
Title	Details	US Country	US
Rescue Me	Release date: December 3, 2001; Label: self-released; Formats: CD	—	—
Underneath the Same Moon	Release date: March 14, 2006; Label: BNA Records; Formats: CD, music download	64	—
Son of a Preacher Man	Release date: March 24, 2009; Label: Warner Bros. Nashville; Formats: CD, music download	3	16
"—" denotes releases that did not chart

=== Extended plays ===
Title	Details	Peak chart positions	
Title	Details	US Country	US Kids
Rich Rocks	Release date: May 17, 2011; Label: Reprise Nashville; Formats: CD, music download	35	—
For the Kids	Release date: May 17, 2011; Label: Reprise Nashville; Formats: CD, music download	40	7
"—" denotes releases that did not chart

=== Singles ===
Year	Title	Peak chart positions				Album
Year	Title	US Country	US	CAN	WW	Album
2000	"I Pray for You"^{A}	53	—	—	—	Underneath the Same Moon
2001	"Forever Loving You"	46	—	—	—	—N/a
2009	"Another You"	45	—	—	—	Son of a Preacher Man
2009	"Shuttin' Detroit Down"	12	75	95	—	Son of a Preacher Man
2009	"The Good Lord and the Man"	56	—	—	—	Son of a Preacher Man
2010	"Country Done Come to Town"	38	—	—	—	Rich Rocks
2019	"Shut Up About Politics" (featuring The Five)	17	91	—	—	—N/a
2020	"Earth to God"	38	—	—	—	—N/a
2021	"Santa's Gotta Dirty Job" (with Mike Rowe; credited to Rich & Rowe)	32	—	—	—	—N/a
2022	"Progress"	14	65	—	153	—N/a
2023	"I'm Offended"	—	—	—	—	The Country Truth
2024	"Revelation" (featuring Sonya Isaacs)	—	—	—	—	TBA
"—" denotes releases that did not chart

- ^{A} "I Pray for You" also peaked at number 63 on the Canadian RPM Country Tracks chart.

=== Featured singles ===
Year	Single	Artist	Peak positions	Album
Year	Single	Artist	US Country	Album
2007	"Come to Bed"	Gretchen Wilson	32	One of the Boys
2023	"End of the World"	Tom MacDonald	—	TBA

== Videography ==
=== Music videos ===
Year	Title	Director
1999	"I Pray for You"	Shaun Silva
2009	"Another You"	Deaton-Flanigen Productions
2009	"Shuttin' Detroit Down"	Deaton-Flanigen Productions
2010	"Country Done Come to Town"	Deaton-Flanigen Productions

=== Guest appearances ===
Year	Title	Director
2007	"Come to Bed" (with Gretchen Wilson)	Deaton-Flanigen Productions, Marc Oswald
2023	"End of the World" (Tom MacDonald Ft. John Rich)	Nova Rockafeler
