= Rhett Akins =

American country singer-songwriter (born 1969)

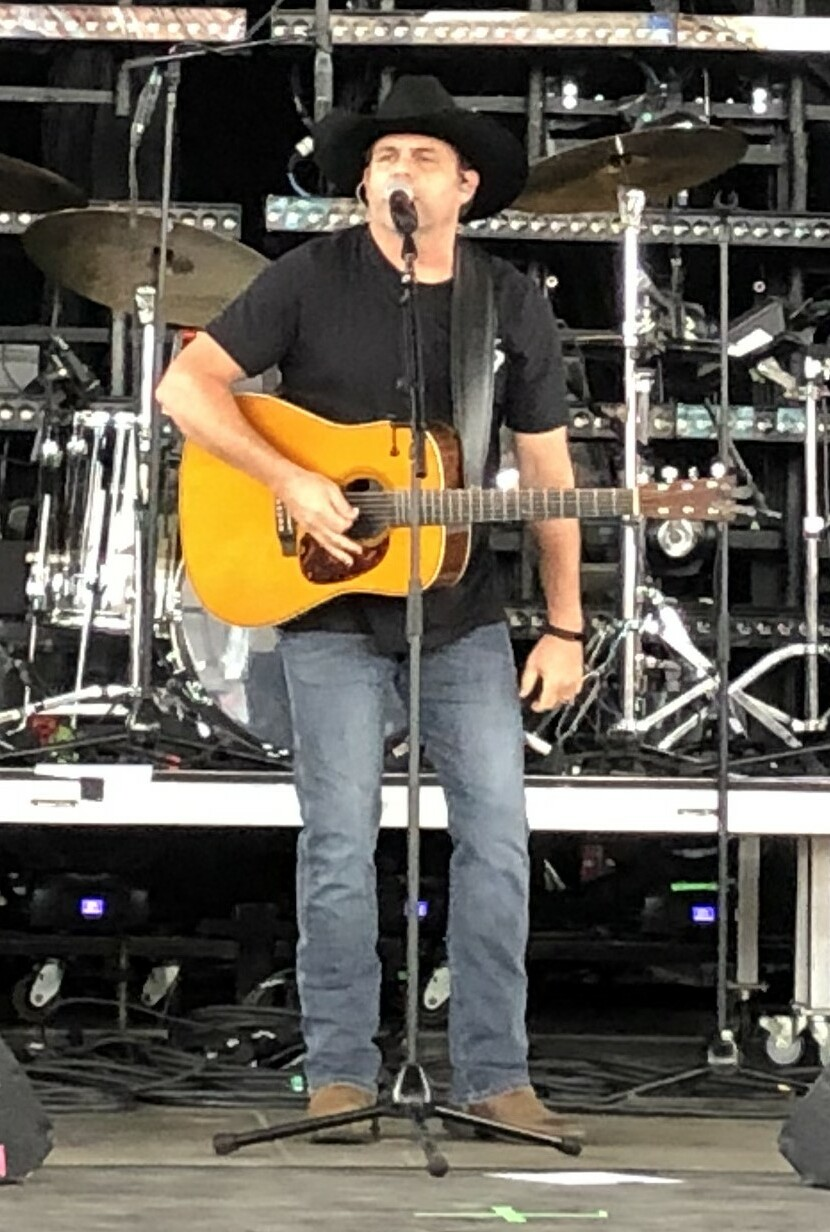
- Akins in 2019

Background information
- Born: Thomas Rhett Akins; October 13, 1969 (age 56)
- Origin: Valdosta, Georgia, U.S.
- Genres: Country
- Occupations: Singer; songwriter
- Instrument: Vocals
- Years active: 1992–present
- Labels: Decca Nashville; MCA Nashville; Audium/Koch; BNA
- Member of: The Peach Pickers
- Spouse: Paige Braswell (m. 1989, divorced) Sonya Mansfield (m. 2017)
- Website: rhettakins.com

Thomas Rhett Akins Sr. (born October 13, 1969) is an American country music singer and songwriter. Signed to Decca Records between 1994 and 1997, he released two albums for that label (1995's A Thousand Memories and 1996's Somebody New), followed by 1998's What Livin's All About on MCA Nashville. Friday Night in Dixie was released in 2002 on Audium Entertainment. Overall, his albums have accounted for fourteen singles on the Billboard Hot Country Songs, including the number one "Don't Get Me Started" from 1996.

Although he has not charted a single since 2006, Akins has written singles for other country music singers, primarily as one-third of the songwriting team The Peach Pickers, alongside Dallas Davidson and Ben Hayslip. He is also the father of fellow country singer Thomas Rhett.

On June 29, 2026, Akins gained one of country music's crowning achievements when he was invited to become a member of the Grand Ole Opry.

== Early life ==
Thomas Rhett Akins was born on October 13, 1969, in Valdosta, Georgia, to Pamela (née LaHood) and Thomas “Buzz” Akins. By age 11, he and his two younger brothers had formed a band. Rhett played football at the University of Georgia and studied business but gave up his studies after a year. He then worked for his father’s oil and gas distribution company.

== Career ==
=== 1992–1994: Move to Nashville and recording contract ===
In 1992, after performing in the theme park show "Music Country Music" at Fiesta Texas in San Antonio, Texas, Akins moved to Nashville, Tennessee, and performed in "Country Music USA" at Opryland Theme Park. Akins then became a demo singer before Decca Records signed him to a recording contract.

=== 1994–1997: A Thousand Memories and Somebody New ===
Akins's first single was "What They're Talkin' About", a No. 35 on the Billboard country charts in late 1994, followed by the No. 36 "I Brake for Brunettes". After these first two singles came his signature song, "That Ain't My Truck". This was his breakthrough hit, peaking at No. 3 on the country charts in mid-1995. All three of these songs were included on his 1995 debut album A Thousand Memories, which also produced the No. 17 "She Said Yes". Also in 1995 and 1996, Akins toured with Reba McEntire. In 1995, he was named one of Country America's "Top New Stars".

Akins' second album, Somebody New, produced his only number one hit in "Don't Get Me Started", which peaked in August 1996. The other three singles from Somebody New were less successful, with "Love You Back" (the second single) becoming his last top 40 hit at No. 38.

=== 1997–2004: Transfer to MCA Nashville, What Livin's All About, and Friday Night in Dixie ===
After Decca's Nashville division was merged into MCA Nashville in 1997, Akins was transferred to MCA Nashville for the release of his third album, 1998's What Livin's All About. This album was even less successful, however, with its lead-off single "More Than Everything" falling one space short of top 40 in the U.S., although it was a No. 25 hit on the RPM country charts in Canada. Also in 1998, Akins charted with a cover of Eddie Rabbitt's 1980 number one hit "Drivin' My Life Away", which Akins covered on the soundtrack to the 1998 film Black Dog.

In 2000, he voiced the character of Tom Sawyer in MGM's animated remake of Tom Sawyer alongside fellow country singer Mark Wills, who voiced Huckleberry Finn, as well as Lee Ann Womack, who voiced Becky's singing voice. A fourth album, Friday Night in Dixie, was released in 2002 on Koch Records. This album's only two singles, "Highway Sunrise" and "In Your Love", peaked at No. 55 and No. 57, respectively.

=== 2005–2006: BNA Records and People Like Me ===
Akins did not release another single until his signing with BNA Records in 2005, when he released the No. 57-peaking "Kiss My Country Ass", which was later recorded by Blake Shelton for his 2010 extended play Hillbilly Bone. It was included on his album People Like Me, which was originally to have been released via BNA on June 14, 2006, but was ultimately self-released in June 2007. "If Heaven Wasn't So Far Away" was the second single from People Like Me, which failed to chart for Akins, but was later recorded by Justin Moore, whose version went to number 1. Down South followed in 2008, as did its only single, the title track, which again failed to chart.

=== 2009–2010: Michael Waddell's Bone Collector: The Brotherhood Album ===
In 2009, Akins released the single "Hung Up", which did not chart. It was later included on the 2010 album Michael Waddell's Bone Collector: The Brotherhood Album, a collaboration with fellow country music singer Dallas Davidson, released through Reprise Records Nashville.

=== Songwriting career ===
In the late 2000s, Akins began writing songs for other artists, primarily with Ben Hayslip and Dallas Davidson, collaboratively known as The Peach Pickers. Among the singles that Akins has co-written are "Put a Girl in It" recorded by Brooks & Dunn, "Barefoot and Crazy" by Jack Ingram, "Gimmie That Girl" and "The Shape I'm In" by Joe Nichols, "All About Tonight", "Honey Bee", "I Lived It", and "Boys 'Round Here" by Blake Shelton, "When She Says Baby", "Just Gettin' Started", "Tonight Looks Good on You" by Jason Aldean, "All Over Me" by Josh Turner, "Hot Mess" by Tyler Farr, "Farmer's Daughter" and "Take a Back Road" by Rodney Atkins, "Bait a Hook" and "Point at You" by Justin Moore, "I Can Take It from There" by Chris Young, "I Know Somebody" by LoCash, "Parking Lot Party", "That Don't Sound Like You" by Lee Brice, "Hey Girl" by Billy Currington, "I Don't Want This Night to End", "Huntin', Fishin' and Lovin' Every Day" by Luke Bryan, "Wild in Your Smile", "Mind Reader", "Small Town Boy" by Dustin Lynch, "It Goes Like This", "Get Me Some of That" and "Star of the Show" by Thomas Rhett, "Granddaddy's Gun" by Aaron Lewis and "A Buncha Girls", "Young & Crazy" by Frankie Ballard, "Kick It in the Sticks", "Small Town Throwdown" by Brantley Gilbert., "Ready Set Roll" by Chase Rice, "Dirt on My Boots" by Jon Pardi, “To Be Loved By You” by Parker McCollum and "Missing" by William Michael Morgan.

== Personal life ==
Akins married Paige Braswell in 1989, but they have since divorced. They have a son, Thomas Rhett Akins Jr. (b. March 30, 1990) and a daughter, Kasey Lee Akins (b. 1993).

Akins married Sonya Mansfield in 2017. They had their first child on March 13, 2020, a boy.

== Discography ==
=== Studio albums ===
Title	Album details	Peak chart positions			
Title	Album details	US Country	US	US Heat	CAN Country
A Thousand Memories	Release date: January 3, 1995; Label: Decca Nashville	45	—	23	23
Somebody New	Release date: June 4, 1996; Label: Decca Nashville	13	102	2	—
What Livin's All About	Release date: January 13, 1998; Label: MCA Nashville	33	—	20	—
Friday Night in Dixie	Release date: March 26, 2002; Label: Audium/Koch	65	—	—	—
People Like Me	Release date: June 11, 2007; Label: Self-released	—	—	—	—
Down South	Release date: July 18, 2008; Label: Self-released	—	—	—	—
"—" denotes releases that did not chart

=== Collaboration albums ===
Title	Album details	Peak chart positions	
Title	Album details	US Country	US Heat
Michael Waddell's Bone Collector: The Brotherhood Album (with Dallas Davidson)	Release date: September 28, 2010; Label: Reprise Nashville	47	19

=== Singles ===
Year	Single	Peak chart positions			Album
Year	Single	US Country	US Bubbling	CAN Country	Album
1994	"What They're Talkin' About"	35	—	44	A Thousand Memories
1995	"I Brake for Brunettes"	36	—	28	A Thousand Memories
1995	"That Ain't My Truck"	3	—	7	A Thousand Memories
1995	"She Said Yes"	17	—	20	A Thousand Memories
1996	"Don't Get Me Started"	1	—	3	Somebody New
1996	"Love You Back"	38	—	51	Somebody New
1996	"Every Cowboy's Dream"	51	—	41	Somebody New
1997	"Somebody Knew"	69	—	—	Somebody New
1997	"More Than Everything"	41	21	25	What Livin's All About
1998	"Better Than It Used to Be"	47	—	62	What Livin's All About
1998	"Drivin' My Life Away"	56	—	61	Black Dog (soundtrack)
2002	"Highway Sunrise"	55	—	—	Friday Night in Dixie
2003	"In Your Love"	57	—	—	Friday Night in Dixie
2005	"Kiss My Country Ass"	57	—	—	People Like Me
2006	"If Heaven Wasn't So Far Away"	—	—	—	People Like Me
2008	"Down South"	—	—	—	Down South
2009	"Hung Up"	—	—	—	The Brotherhood Album
"—" denotes releases that did not chart

=== Other charted songs ===
Year	Single	Peak chart positions		Album
Year	Single	US Country	US Country Airplay	Album
2017	"Drink a Little Beer" (Thomas Rhett featuring Rhett Akins)	42	51	Life Changes

=== Music videos ===
Year	Video	Director
1994	"What They're Talkin' About"	Jon Small
1995	"That Ain't My Truck"	Mary Newman-Said
1996	"She Said Yes"	Mary Newman-Said
1996	"Love You Back"	Guy Guillet
1997	"More Than Everything"	Richard Murray
1998	"Better Than It Used to Be"	Richard Murray
1998	"Drivin' My Life Away"	Charley Randazzo

== Filmography ==
Film
Year	Film	Role	Notes
2000	Tom Sawyer	Tom Sawyer	Direct-to-video

== Awards and nominations ==
=== As a recording artist ===
Year	Organization	Award	Nominee/Work	Result
1996	American Music Awards	Favorite Country New Artist	Rhett Akins	Nominated
1998	Academy of Country Music Awards	Top New Male Vocalist	Rhett Akins	Nominated

=== As a songwriter ===
Year	Organization	Award	Nominee/Work	Result
2012	Academy of Country Music Awards	Songwriter of the Year	Rhett Akins	Nominated
2014	Academy of Country Music Awards	Songwriter of the Year	Rhett Akins	Nominated
2017	Country Music Association Awards	Song of the Year	"Dirt on My Boots" co-written with Jesse Frasure and Ashley Gorley	Nominated
2018	Academy of Country Music Awards	Songwriter of the Year	Rhett Akins	Won
2019	Grammy Awards	Best Country Song	"I Lived It" co-written with Ashley Gorley, Ben Hayslip and Ross Copperman	Nominated
2020	Academy of Country Music Awards	Songwriter of the Decade	Rhett Akins	Won
