= With Me (Lonestar song) =

Single by Lonestar

from the album I'm Already There
- B-side: "Out Go the Lights"
- Released: August 13, 2001
- Recorded: 2001
- Genre: Country pop; pop rock
- Length: 3:53
- Label: BNA 69105
- Songwriters: Brett James; Troy Verges
- Producer: Dann Huff

Lonestar singles chronology
| "I'm Already There" (2001) | "With Me" (2001) | "Not a Day Goes By" (2002) |

"With Me" is a song written by Brett James and Troy Verges, and recorded by American country music group Lonestar. It was released in August 2001 as the second single from their album I'm Already There. It peaked at number 10 on the U.S. Billboard Hot Country Singles & Tracks chart.

== Music video ==
The music video features Lonestar on their touring, and was directed by Keech Rainwater, who is also one of the members of the band.

== Chart positions ==
| Chart (2001) | Peak position |
|---|---|
| US Hot Country Songs (Billboard) | 10 |
| US Billboard Hot 100 | 63 |
