= Mark D. Sanders =

American country music songwriter (born 1950)

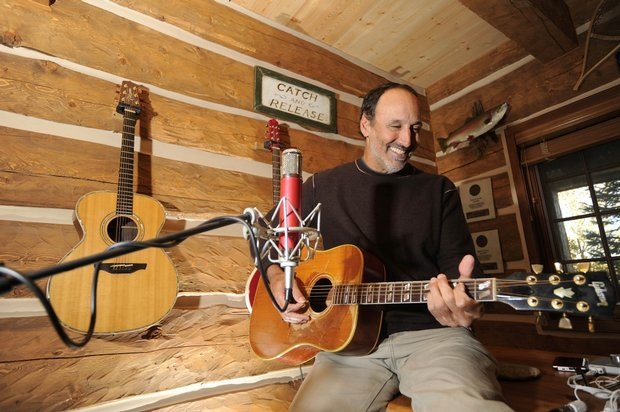

Background information
- Born: Mark Daniel Sanders; September 7, 1950 (age 75); Los Angeles, California, U.S.
- Genres: Country, country pop
- Occupation: Songwriter
- Years active: 1980–present

Mark Daniel Sanders (born September 7, 1950) is an American country music songwriter. He has written 15 No. 1 hits, 50 singles, and over 200 cuts, including the famous Lee Ann Womack single "I Hope You Dance", co-written with Tia Sillers. He has recently proclaimed himself the Vice Mayor of Centennial Small Dog Park in Nashville.

== Early life ==
Sanders was born in Los Angeles, California on September 7, 1950. He lived in the Lemiert Park area of Los Angeles until his family moved to the City of Orange in Orange County. He graduated from Villa Park High School in 1968, lettering in basketball all three years, and then played two more years of basketball at Fullerton Junior College.

While majoring in literature, Sanders also enjoyed surfing at the University of California, San Diego, where he wrote his first songs. After graduation he worked as a VISTA volunteer in Arkansas for eighteen months, then earned his teaching certificate at the University of Arkansas in Fayetteville.

He and his first wife returned to California in 1975, where he taught for three years in the Orange Unified School District. He abandoned a teaching career after the passage of California's controversial Proposition 13, then had a succession of menial jobs until making the decision to pursue songwriting as a career in Nashville in early 1980. He and the same first wife arrived in Tennessee on March 5, 1980.

There were more menial jobs awaiting Sanders in Nashville: cooking at the Sailmaker and Ruby Tuesday's, substitute teaching, two years in charge of In School Suspension at Hillsboro High School and driving a tour bus.

In 1986, he married Cindy Sasser whom he met while working at Hillsboro High School. After a lengthy, successful songwriting career, Mark now enjoys fly fishing the Yampa river in Steamboat Springs, Colorado where he and Cindy spend their summers, body surfing in Maui where they spend their winters, traveling and spending time with their adult children.

== Career ==
Sanders' first songwriting credits included tracks on Garth Brooks' 1990 album No Fences. He also wrote singles for Diamond Rio, Tracy Lawrence, and John Anderson.

Sanders was the NSAI Songwriter of the Year in 1995, a year that brought him five No. 1 hits. He also earned the same award in 1996. In 1997 he was the ASCAP Country Songwriter of the Year, and had the ASCAP song of the year with Lonestar's "No News".

In his career Sanders has written for a number of publishers: Acuff-Rose Publishing, Alabama Band Music, Mid-Summer Music, MCA Music Publishing, Starstruck Writers Group, Universal Music Publishing, and Large Vista Music. His self-owned publishing companies include: Mark D Music (sold to Universal Music in 1997), Soda Creek Songs, Yampa Tunes, Blue Clear Music, and Songs of the Sanderosa.

On November 7, 2011, Mark D Sanders released "History & Hope", an album that features him singing 10 of his songs spanning his career, including "I Hope You Dance," and in 2017 he released a second CD entitled "First Fast Car."

Sanders collaborated with Tia Sillers on the Lee Ann Womack song "I Hope You Dance". The song became a No. 1 country hit and Top 20 pop hit for Lee Ann Womack, and received the Grammy Award for "Best Country Song," as well as a Grammy nomination for Song of the Year. The song also received CMA & ACM Awards for Song of the Year in 2000. The song stayed atop the Billboard Country chart for five consecutive weeks.

The song's popularity led to the release of a book entitled "I Hope You Dance", another collaboration of Sillers and Sanders, with sales of over 2,000,000 books to date. The book contains poems and writings inspired by the song. There is also an "I Hope You Dance" children's book and journal. Sanders and Sillers later collaborated again on an inspirational book entitled "Climb".

In 2009 Sanders was inducted into the Nashville Songwriters Hall of Fame.

== Inspiration and technique ==
Sanders attributes his writing abilities to self-editing and having faith in his writing.

== No. 1 hits ==
- "(This Ain't) No Thinkin' Thing" – Trace Adkins
- "Blue Clear Sky" – George Strait
- "Come Cryin' to Me", "No News" – Lonestar
- "Daddy's Money" – Ricochet
- "Don't Get Me Started" – Rhett Akins
- "She Had Me at Heads Carolina" - Cole Swindell
- "I Hope You Dance" – Lee Ann Womack
- "The Heart Is a Lonely Hunter" – Reba McEntire
- "If You've Got Love" – John Michael Montgomery
- "It Matters to Me" – Faith Hill
- "Money in the Bank" – John Anderson
- "Runnin' Behind" – Tracy Lawrence
- "They're Playin' Our Song" – Neal McCoy
- "Whatcha Gonna Do with a Cowboy" – Chris LeDoux & Garth Brooks
Cuts
- "(This Ain't) No Thinkin' Thing" – Trace Adkins, 1997 (No. 1 Country)
- "A Door" – Aaron Tippin, 1997 (No. 65 Country)
- "A Matter of Wine" – Mel Tillis, 1983
- "A River Like You" – Vince Gill, 2006
- "Ain't That the Way It Goes" – Dave Kemp, 1983 (No. 75 Country)
- "Another Friday Night" – Kenny Chesney, 1996
- "Anytime" – Rick Trevino, 1996
- "Baby's Gone" – Trace Adkins, 2003
- "Backslider's Prayer" – Ty England, 1996; Lesley McDaniel, 2000
- "Better Than It Used to Be" – Rhett Akins, 1998 (No. 47 Country)
- "The Big Bad Broken Heart" – Regina Regina, 1997; Kimberlee Nash, 2003
- "Blue Clear Sky" – George Strait, 1996 (No. 1 Country); Bob DiPiero, 2001
- "Bobbie Ann Mason" – Rick Trevino, 1995 (No. 6 Country)
- "Buckaroo" – Lee Ann Womack, 1998 (No. 27 Country)
- "Careful What You Wish For" – Ricky Lynn Gregg, 2001; Texas Unlimited Band, 2005
- "Cheatin' On Her Heart" – Jeff Carson, 1998 (No. 52 Country)
- "Cold Dog Soup" – Guy Clark, 1999
- "Come Cryin' to Me" – Lonestar, 1997 (No. 1 Country)
- "Come Home" – Trace Adkins, 2001
- "Come With Me" – Zane Lewis, 2008
- "Daddy's Money" – Ricochet, 1996 (No. 1 Country); Country Kickers, 1997
- "Divine Intervention" – Greg Holland, 1994; Jeff Carson, 2001
- "Don't Get Me Started" – Rhett Akins, 1996 (No. 1 Country)
- "Don't Take Your Love Away from Me" – Randy Travis, 1996
- "Drinkin' Problem" – Lori McKenna, 2007
- "Fools Hall of Fame" – Barry and Holly Tashian, 1997
- "Geronimo" – Andy Childs, 1993; James T. Horn, 1997
- "Get a Guitar" – Jeff Carson, 1995
- "Girls Ride Horses Too" – Judy Rodman, 1987 (No. 7 Country)
- "Hands On Man" – Jeff Bates, 2006
- "Happy As We Wanna Be" – Rhett Akins, 1998
- "Have a Nice Rest of Your Life" – Randy Travis, 1989
- "Heads Carolina, Tails California" – Jo Dee Messina, 1996 (No. 2 Country)
- "The Heart Is a Lonely Hunter" – Reba McEntire, 1995 (No. 1 Country)
- "Here's Hopin'" – Kathy Mattea, 1989; Roy Rogers & Randy Travis, 1991
- "Hills & Hollers" – Adrienne Young & Little Sadie, 2005
- "Hotwired" – Shawn Camp, 2006; Porter Wagoner, 2007
- "House Huntin'" – Matthews, Wright & King, 1992 (No. 68 Country)
- "I Ain't Goin' Nowhere" – Martina McBride, 1999
- "I Hope You Dance" – Lee Ann Womack, 2000 (No. 1 Country/No. 1 AC /No. 14 Pop)
  - NSAI Song of the Year for 2000–2001
  - 2000 ACM and 2000 CMA Song and Single of the Year
  - 2000 Grammy for Best Country Song
  - 2001 ASCAP Country Song of the Year
  - 2001 BMI Country Song of the Year Sons of the Desert
  - 2000 Oleta Adams
  - 2001 Reigning Mercy
  - 2001 Dennis Caplinger
  - 2002 Willie Jolley
  - 2003 Lisa Otey & the Desert Divas
  - 2004 Ronan Keating
  - 2004 Deborah Lippman
  - 2005 Tia Sillers
  - 2005 Glendon Smith Quintet
  - 2006 Kim McAbee
  - 2006 Gladys Knight
- "I'm Up For Gettin' Down Tonight" – Clifford Curry, 1985; Savannah, 1985
- "I'd Rather Ride Around With You" – Reba McEntire, 1997 (No. 2 Country)
- "I'd Say That's Right" – Clay Walker, 1997
- "If I Could Live Your Life" – Linda Davis & Reba McEntire, 1996
- "If I'm Ever Over You" – Michelle Wright, 1992
- "If You've Got Love" – John Michael Montgomery, 1995 (No. 1 Country)
- "I'll Take Care Of You" – Kathy Mattea, 1989
- "I'm Your Man" – Jason Sellers, 1997 (No. 37 Country)
- "In The Blood" – Rob Crosby, 1992 (No. 48 Country)
- "It Goes Without Saying" – Tim Malchak, 1988 (No. 35 Country)
- "It Matters To Me" – Faith Hill, 1996 (No. 1 Country / No. 74 Pop)
- "It's About Time" – Julie Reeves, 1999 (No. 51 Country)
- "Just Another Heartache" – Chely Wright, 1998 (No. 39 Country)
- "Just As Dead Today" – Shawn Camp, 2006
- "Knocked Up" – Heidi Newfield, 2008
- "Leaving This Life" – Lori McKenna, 2007
- "Like a Hurricane" – Kathy Mattea, 1987; Pat Alger, 1991; The Dillards, 1992
- "Little Miracles" – Jenny Simpson, 1998
- "Loretta Lynn's Lincoln" – Josh Turner, 2006
- "Love and Gravity" – BlackHawk, 1997
- "Love Like a River" – Daylon Wear, 2001
- "Love Will Carry The Load" – Susie Luchsinger, 1995
- "Love Won't Wait" – The Whites, 1986 (No. 36 Country)
- "Macon Love" – David Wills, 1984 (No. 69 Country)
- "The Man Behind the Wheel" – Charlie Floyd, 1993
- "Many a Mile" – Collin Raye, 1992
- "Many Mansions" – Moe Bandy, 1989 (No. 34 Country)
- "The Memories Remain" – Emmylou Harris, 1983; Barry and Holly Tashian, 1993
- "Mirror, Mirror" – Diamond Rio, 1991 (No. 3 Country); Bob DiPiero, 2001
- "Money In the Bank" – John Anderson, 1993 (No. 1 Country)
- "My Heart Has a History" – Paul Brandt, 1996 (No. 5 Country)
- "Never Had a Reason To" – Reba McEntire, 1996
- "New Orleans" – Oak Ridge Boys, 1999; Toby Keith, 1999
- "No News" – Lonestar, 1996 (No. 1 Country) — 1997 ASCAP Country Song of the Year
- "Off My Rocker" – Billy Currington, 2002
- "Off to Join the World" – Blaine Larson, 2003; Cowboy Jack Clement, 2004
- "Oh Carolina" – Vince Gill, 1984 (No. 38 Country)
- "On Again, Off Again" – Nashville Bluegrass Band, 1993
- "One Love, One You" – Oak Ridge Boys, 1987
- "The Other Side of This Kiss" – Mindy McCready, 1998 (No. 41 Country)
- "Preachin' To The Choir" – Jeff Carson, 1995
- "The Quittin' Kind" – Joe Diffie, 1999 (No. 21 Country / No. 90 Pop)
- "Runnin' Away With My Heart" – Lonestar, 1996 (No. 8 Country)
- "Runnin' Behind" – Tracy Lawrence, 1992 (No. 1 Country)
- "Save This One For Me" – Rick Trevino, 1995 (No. 45 Country)
- "See Rock City" – Rick Trevino, 1997 (No. 44 Country) Kentucky HeadHunters, 1997
- "She's Still There" – Trace Adkins, 1999
- "Small Towns Are Smaller for Girls" – Holly Dunn, 1987
- "Spinning Straw Into Gold" – Barry & Holly Tashian, 1994
- "Straight to You" – Brian McComas, 2003
- "Talk to My Heart" – Joan Kennedy, 1994
- "That'd Be Alright" – Alan Jackson, 2003 (No. 2 Country / No. 29 Pop)
- "That's a Man" – Jack Ingram, 2009 (No. 15 Country)
- "That's Enough of That" – Mila Mason, 1996 (No. 18 Country)
- "That's Me (Every Chance I Get)" – George Strait, 1997
- "That's One You Owe Me" – Johnny Cash, 1989
- "That's the Way I Feel" – Delbert McClinton, 1990
- "That's What I Like About Love" – Billy Dean, 1993
- "That's What Love'll Get You" – Joe Nichols, 2005
- "The Day That She Left Tulsa (In A Chevy)" – Wade Hayes, 1998 (No. 5 Country / No. 86 Pop)
- "There You Are" – Martina McBride, 2000 (No. 10 Country / No. 15 AC / No. 60 Pop)
- "They're Playin' Our Song" – Neal McCoy, 1995 (No. 3 Country) Bob DiPiero, 2001
- "Thinking 'Bout Leaving" – James & Michael Younger, 1983; Gene Watson, 1983; Butch Baker, 1984 (No. 56 Country)
- "This'd Be a Real Good Day" – Chad Austin, 2000
- "Those Hands" – Rhett Akins, 1995
- "Time Is a Bandit" – Ricky Skaggs, 1997
- "Tune of a Twenty Dollar Bill" – Lonesome River Band, 2002; Shawn Camp, 2004; Joey & Rory, 2008
- "Two Ways to Fall" – Barry & Holly Tashian, 1997; Rodney Redman, 2002; Ty England, 1996
- "Victim of the Game" – Garth Brooks, 1990; Trisha Yearwood, 1991
- "Vidalia" – Sammy Kershaw, 1996 (No. 10 Country)
- "Waitin' for the Day to Break" – Shawn Camp, 2006
- "Walking to Jerusalem" – Tracy Byrd, 1995 (No. 15 Country / No. 92 Pop)
- "Way Beyond The Blue" – The Bonners, 1988 (No. 99 Country); Roger Ballard, 1993
- "The Way Things Are Goin'" – Darryl Worley, 2000
- "What If I Do" – Mindy McCready, 1997 (No. 26 Country)
- "What More Do You Want from Me?" – Rhonda Vincent, 1996; Diamond Rio, 1998
- "Whatcha Gonna Do With a Cowboy" – Chris LeDoux & Garth Brooks, 1992 (No. 7 Country); Country Dance Kings, 1993
- "When Her Love Was Mine" – Pirates of the Mississippi, 1995
- "When I Get Where I'm Goin'" – Nashville Bluegrass Band, 1993
- "When Life Hits Hard" – Ricky Skaggs, 1997
- "Willow In the Wind" – Kathy Mattea, 1989
- "Yeah Buddy" – Jeff Carson, 1995 (No. 69 Country)
- "You Are What You Do" – Highway 101, 1993; The Moffatts, 1995
- "Your Woman Misses Her Man" – Chely Wright, 1997
