= Emerson Drive discography =

- Studio albums: 7
- Extended plays: 1
- Compilation albums: 1
- Singles: 33
- Music videos: 25

The discography for Canadian country music group Emerson Drive consists of seven studio albums, one compilation, one EP, 33 singles, and 25 music videos. The band was formed in February 1995, under the name 12 Gauge, and released an independent debut album in 1996 titled Open Season. The group then released their second album, Until You Walk the Tracks in 1997. The album included the singles "Love's a Trip" and "Some Trains Never Come", which peaked at number 70 and number 36 on the Canadian RPM Country Tracks Chart.

In 2001, the group changed their name to Emerson Drive, signed to DreamWorks Nashville and released the third album, Emerson Drive, and issued three singles. The group later released one more album for DreamWorks Nashville, What If?, before signing to Midas Records Nashville where they released their fifth album Countrified, which contained the U.S. Billboard Hot Country Songs number one hit "Moments". The group's most recent studio album, Roll, was released in October 2012.

== Studio albums ==
| Title | Details | Peak chart positions | | |
| Title | Details | US Country | US | US Heat |
|---|---|---|---|---|
| Open Season (as 12 Gauge) | Release date: 1996; Label: 12 Gauge | — | — | — |
| Until You Walk the Tracks (as 12 Gauge) | Release date: 1997; Label: 12 Gauge | — | — | — |
| Emerson Drive | Release date: May 21, 2002; Label: DreamWorks Nashville | 13 | 108 | 2 |
| What If? | Release date: June 29, 2004; Label: DreamWorks Nashville | 12 | 107 | 2 |
| Countrified | Release date: September 19, 2006; Label: Midas Records Nashville | 30 | 141 | 2 |
| Believe | Release date: May 5, 2009; Label: Midas/Valory Music Group/ Open Road Recordings | — | — | — |
| Roll | Release date: October 30, 2012; Label: Open Road Recordings | 62 | — | — |
"—" denotes releases that did not chart

== Compilation albums ==
| Title | Details |
|---|---|
| Decade of Drive | Release date: February 8, 2011; Label: Open Road/Amdian Music Co. |

== Extended plays ==
| Title | Details |
|---|---|
| Tilt-a-Whirl | Release date: April 14, 2015; Label: Big Star Recordings |

== Singles ==
=== 1990s and 2000s ===
| Year | Single | Peak positions | | | | Album |
| Year | Single | CAN Country | CAN | US Country | US | Album |
|---|---|---|---|---|---|---|
| 1996 | "Hopeless Guy" (as 12 Gauge) | — | — | — | — | Open Season |
| 1997 | "Love's a Trip" (as 12 Gauge) | 55 | — | — | — | Until You Walk the Tracks |
| 1998 | "Some Trains Never Come" (as 12 Gauge) | 36 | — | — | — | Until You Walk the Tracks |
| 2001 | "I Should Be Sleeping" | — | — | 4 | 35 | Emerson Drive |
| 2002 | "Fall into Me" | — | — | 3 | 34 | Emerson Drive |
| 2003 | "Only God (Could Stop Me Loving You)" | — | — | 23 | 124 | Emerson Drive |
| 2003 | "Waitin' on Me" | — | 38 | — | — | What If? |
| 2004 | "Last One Standing" | 25 | — | 21 | 89 | What If? |
| 2004 | "November" | — | — | 41 | — | What If? |
| 2005 | "If You Were My Girl" | 7 | — | — | — | What If? |
| 2005 | "Still Got Yesterday" | 12 | — | — | — | What If? |
| 2006 | "A Good Man" | 5 | — | 17 | 120 | Countrified |
| 2006 | "Countrified Soul" | 6 | — | — | — | Countrified |
| 2006 | "Moments" | 4 | 62 | 1 | 56 | Countrified |
| 2007 | "You Still Own Me" | — | — | 22 | — | Countrified |
| 2007 | "Testify" | 5 | 78 | — | — | Countrified |
| 2007 | "Everyday Woman" | 9 | 87 | — | — | Countrified |
| 2008 | "Belongs to You" | 8 | 73 | 32 | — | Believe |
| 2009 | "Believe" | 6 | 73 | — | — | Believe |
| 2009 | "I Love This Road" | 6 | 86 | — | — | Believe |
| 2009 | "The Extra Mile" | 8 | 96 | — | — | Believe |
"—" denotes releases that did not chart

=== 2010s and 2020s ===
| Year | Single | Peak positions | | Certifications | Album |
| Year | Single | CAN Country | CAN | Certifications | Album |
|---|---|---|---|---|---|
| 2010 | "That Kind of Beautiful" | 7 | 80 | | Believe |
| 2010 | "When I See You Again" | 13 | 97 | | Decade of Drive |
| 2011 | "Let Your Love Speak" | 7 | 89 | | Decade of Drive |
| 2011 | "Sleep It Off" | 10 | — | | Decade of Drive |
| 2012 | "She's My Kind of Crazy" | 8 | 37 | CAN: Platinum | Roll |
| 2012 | "Let It Roll" (with Doc Walker) | 10 | 61 | | Roll |
| 2013 | "With You" | 12 | — | | Roll |
| 2013 | "She Always Gets What She Wants" | 17 | — | | Roll |
| 2015 | "Who We Are" | 9 | 100 | | Tilt-a-Whirl |
| 2015 | "Till the Summer's Gone" | 25 | — | | Tilt-a-Whirl |
| 2015 | "Good Hurt" | 38 | — | | Tilt-a-Whirl |
| 2017 | "Just Got Paid" | 10 | — | CAN: Gold | Non-album single |
| 2018 | "The Road" | 6 | — | | Non-album single |
| 2019 | "Country People" | 44 | — | | Non-album single |
| 2020 | "Footprints on the Moon" | — | — | | Non-album single |
| 2022 | "Every Girl That Got Away" | — | — | | Non-album single |
"—" denotes releases that did not chart

=== As a featured artist ===
| Year | Single | Peak positions | | Album |
| Year | Single | CAN Country | CAN | Album |
|---|---|---|---|---|
| 2013 | "Wake Me Up" (Tebey featuring Emerson Drive) | 5 | 56 | Two |

== Music videos ==
| Year | Video | Director |
|---|---|---|
| 1996 | "Hopeless Guy" (as 12 Gauge) | |
| 1997 | "Love's a Trip" (as 12 Gauge) | |
| 1998 | "Some Trains Never Come" (as 12 Gauge) | |
| 2001 | "I Should Be Sleeping" | Thom Oliphant |
| 2002 | "Fall Into Me" | Trey Fanjoy |
| 2003 | "Only God (Could Stop Me Loving You)" | Steven Goldmann |
| 2004 | "Last One Standing" | Trey Fanjoy |
| 2004 | "November" | Stephano Barberis |
| 2005 | "If You Were My Girl" | Stephano Barberis |
| 2005 | "Still Got Yesterday" | Stephano Barberis |
| 2006 | "A Good Man" | Steven Goldmann |
| 2006 | "Countrified Soul" | Steven Goldmann |
| 2006 | "Moments" | Steven Goldmann |
| 2007 | "You Still Own Me" (Live from the Grand Ole Opry) | James Burton Yockey |
| 2008 | "Belongs to You" | Steven Goldmann |
| 2009 | "I Love This Road" | David Pichette |
| 2010 | "That Kind of Beautiful" | David Pichette |
| 2010 | "When I See You Again" | David Pichette |
| 2011 | "Let Your Love Speak" | David Pichette |
| 2011 | "Sleep It Off" | David Pichette |
| 2012 | "She's My Kind of Crazy" | David Pichette |
| 2012 | "Let It Roll" (with Doc Walker) | David Pichette |
| 2013 | "With You" | Steven Goldmann/David Pichette |
| 2015 | "Till the Summer's Gone" | David Pichette |
| 2015 | "Good Hurt" | |

== Other appearances ==
| Year | Song | Album |
|---|---|---|
| 2002 | "I Should Be Sleeping" (3 a.m. Mix) | I Should Be Sleeping/Hollywood Kiss |
| 2002 | "I Should Be Sleeping" (Acoustic Mix) | I Should Be Sleeping/Hollywood Kiss |
| 2004 | "The Devil Went Down to Georgia" (Live) | Digital release only |
| 2004 | "Fishin' in the Dark" (Live) | Digital release only |
| 2004 | "You're Like Coming Home" (Live) | Digital release only |
| 2007 | "I Can Only Imagine" | Songs for Worship: Country |
| 2012 | "O Holy Night" | Digital release only |
