= Decade of Drive =

Greatest hits album by Emerson Drive
- Released: February 8, 2011
- Genre: Country
- Length: 57:33
- Label: Open Road
- Producers: Emerson Drive; David Kalmusky; James Stroud; Josh Leo; Julian King; Kevin Churko; Richard Marx; Teddy Gentry

Emerson Drive chronology
Believe (2009)	Decade of Drive (2011)	Roll (2012)

Singles from Decade of Drive
- 1. "When I See You Again" Released: October 18, 2010; 2. "Let Your Love Speak" Released: April 4, 2011; 3. "Sleep It Off" Released: August 1, 2011

Professional ratings
Review scores
Source	Rating
Allmusic	3.5/5 stars
Roughstock	3.5/5 stars

Decade of Drive is a greatest hits album by Canadian country music group Emerson Drive. The album was released in Canada on February 8, 2011 via Open Road Recordings. The album features 13 of the band's hits and three new songs. The album's first single, "When I See You Again", was written in memory of the group's former bassist, Patrick Bourque, who died by suicide in September 2007. It was released to Canadian radio in late 2010. The album's second single "Let Your Love Speak" was released to U.S. country radio in 2011. The album's third single "Sleep It Off" was released to Canadian country radio on August 1, 2011.

== Track listing ==
No.	Title	Writer(s)	Length
1.	"I Should Be Sleeping"	Shaye Smith, Lisa Drew	2:58
2.	"Fall into Me"	Danny Orton, Jeremy Stover	2:50
3.	"Countrified Soul"	Ronnie Rogers, Teddy Gentry, Josh Leo, Brad Mates	2:59
4.	"Moments"	Annie Tate, Sam Tate, Dave Berg	4:57
5.	"The Extra Mile"	Bonnie Baker, Paul Sikes	4:04
6.	"Believe"	Leo, Shawn Colvin	3:56
7.	"A Good Man"	Victoria Shaw, Adrienne Follesé, Keith Follesé	2:58
8.	"Everyday Woman"	Brian Maher, Stover	3:21
9.	"I Love This Road"	Mates, Tommy Lee James	3:47
10.	"That Kind of Beautiful"	Luke Laird, Hillary Lindsey, Gordie Sampson	3:08
11.	"When I See You Again"	Danick Dupelle, Mates, Tebey	3:13
12.	"Sleep It Off"	Dupelle, Mates	3:10
13.	"Let Your Love Speak"	Dupelle, Joshua Bartholomew, Steven Lee Olsen	4:07
14.	"November" (acoustic version)	Angelo Petraglia, Brett James	4:26
15.	"Belongs to You" (acoustic version)	Dave Berg, Rivers Rutherford, Tom Shapiro	3:50
16.	"Last One Standing" (acoustic version)	Fee Waybill, Richard Marx	3:37
Total length:			57:33

== Chart performance ==
=== Singles ===
Year	Single	Peak positions
Year	Single	CAN
2010	"When I See You Again"	97
2011	"Let Your Love Speak"	89
2011	"Sleep It Off"	—
"—" denotes releases that did not chart
