= Doc Walker (disambiguation) =

Doc Walker is a Canadian country music group.

Doc Walker may also refer to:

- Doc Walker (album), their fourth studio album released in 2006
- Norman R. Walker (1889–1949), a Canadian-born American pharmacist and politician
- Rick Walker (born 1955), an American sports broadcaster and retired football tight end
