= Sara Smile (album) =

Studio album by Jimmy Wayne
- Released: November 23, 2009
- Genre: Country
- Label: Valory Music Group
- Producers: Mark Bright; Nathan Chapman; Dann Huff

Jimmy Wayne chronology
Do You Believe Me Now (2008)	Sara Smile (2009)

Singles from Sara Smile
- 1. "Sara Smile" Released: October 3, 2009; 2. "Just Knowing You Love Me" Released: February 22, 2010

Professional ratings
Review scores
Source	Rating
Allmusic	4/5 stars
Country Weekly	3.5/5 stars
Roughstock	unfavorable

Sara Smile is the third studio album by American country music singer Jimmy Wayne. It was released on November 23, 2009, by Valory Music Group, an imprint of Big Machine Records. The album's title track is a cover of Hall & Oates' 1976 single, as well as the first single from it. Dann Huff, Mark Bright and Nathan Chapman produced the album.

== Content ==
Wayne co-wrote four of the album's tracks: "Just Knowing You Love Me," "Just Look at You," "I'll Never Leave You" and "Elephant Ears." The title track and lead-off single is a rendition of Hall & Oates' 1976 single, featuring backing vocals from the duo. Also included is the song "Things I Believe," which fellow country singer Keith Urban wrote with John Shanks, as well as "Belongs to You," previously released as a single by Canadian country band Emerson Drive on its 2009 album Believe. Additionally, "I'll Never Leave You" was a non-charting single released by Wayne to country radio in 2007, but was not included on a previous album.

== Critical reception ==
Thom Jurek of Allmusic gave it four stars out of five. His review described the "Sara Smile" cover favorably and said, "Three full-lengths in, Wayne is transcending his singles artist status and becoming an album-oriented one because of the musical consistency and hardcore emotional intensity of his singing and writing." Jessica Phillips of Country Weekly magazine also cited this cover as a standout track and commended it for containing "romantic ballads" that "[give] his voice room to soar." Her review gave it three-and-a-half stars out of five.

Dan McIntosh of Roughstock gave a mostly negative review, saying that the Hall & Oates cover "certainly smells like a deceptive ploy to attract middle-aged female music fans." He also criticized the themes of most songs by saying, "One also gathers that Wayne is convinced women today are looking for transparent men of their word." McIntosh's review also criticized the album for a lack of up-tempo material.

== Track listing ==
No.	Title	Writer(s)	Length
1.	"Things I Believe"	John Shanks, Keith Urban	3:20
2.	"All the Time in the World"	Steve Robson, Hillary Lindsey	3:38
3.	"Sara Smile" (featuring Daryl Hall and John Oates)	Daryl Hall, John Oates	3:46
4.	"Just Knowing You Love Me" (featuring Whitney Duncan)	Jimmy Wayne, Brett Beavers, Tony Martin	4:06
5.	"Just Look at You"	Wayne, Bob Regan	3:44
6.	"Counting the Days"	Robson, John Kennedy, Andrea Stolpe	4:11
7.	"There's a Memory"	Clint Lagerberg, Sean McConnell	3:33
8.	"Belongs to You"	Dave Berg, Rivers Rutherford, Tom Shapiro	3:44
9.	"I'll Never Leave You"	Wayne	3:59
10.	"Elephant Ears"	Wayne, Don Henry	4:26

== Personnel ==
- Nick Buda – drums
- Tom Bukovac – electric guitar
- Nathan Chapman – acoustic guitar
- Jake Clayton – fiddle
- Eric Darken – percussion
- Dan Dugmore – electric guitar
- Paul Franklin – steel guitar
- Daryl Hall – vocals on "Sara Smile"
- Wes Hightower – background vocals
- Mark Hill – bass guitar
- Whitney Duncan – vocals on "Just Knowing You Love Me"
- Dann Huff – electric guitar, mandolin
- Mike Johnson – steel guitar
- Charlie Judge – keyboards, drum loops, percussion, strings
- Andy Leftwich – fiddle
- Chris McHugh – drums
- Tim Marks – bass guitar
- Jimmy Nichols – keyboards
- John Oates – vocals on "Sara Smile"
- Scotty Sanders – steel guitar
- John Shanks – electric guitar
- Jimmie Lee Sloas – bass guitar
- Ilya Toshinsky – acoustic guitar
- Jimmy Wayne – acoustic guitar, lead vocals, background vocals
- Lonnie Wilson – drums
- Jonathan Yudkin – upright bass, cello, fiddle, mandolin, viola, violin

== Chart performance ==
Album

Chart (2009)	Peak position
U.S. Billboard Top Country Albums	32

Singles

Year	Single	Peak chart positions
Year	Single	US Country
2009	"Sara Smile" (with Daryl Hall and John Oates)	31
2010	"Just Knowing You Love Me" (with Whitney Duncan)	59
