= Believe in Angels Believe in Me =

Studio album by Angel
- Released: August 10, 2004
- Genre: Pop; dance-pop; R&B
- Length: 46:44
- Label: Midas
- Producer: Johnny Jam; The Matrix; Wizardz of Oz

Singles from Believe in Angels Believe in Me
- 1. "Just the Way I Am" Released: June 14, 2004; 2. "Love Is" Released: August 16, 2004; 3. "How Can I Lie" Released: 2004; 4. "Lessons in Love" Released: 2005

Professional ratings
Review scores
Source	Rating
AllMusic	2/5 stars

Believe in Angels Believe in Me is the only solo studio album by American singer Angel. It was released on August 10, 2004, by Midas Records. The album was released a year after her departure from the girl group No Secrets. Believe in Angels Believe in Me failed to chart but did receive multiple reviews from well-known sources. Its singles reached the Billboard Hot Dance Tracks chart. A second album was recorded but never released. Angel went on to announce that she was leaving the entertainment industry to follow her dreams of higher education.

== Track listing ==
Believe in Angels Believe in Me track listing
No.	Title	Writer(s)	Producer(s)	Length
1.	"Believe in Angels"	Andrew Bojanic; Angel Faith; Elizabeth Hooper	The Wizardz of Oz	4:29
2.	"Lessons in Love"	Johnny Jam; Phoenix Stone	Jam	3:49
3.	"Wild Guess"	Jeanette Olsson; Jam; Storm Lee	Jam	3:28
4.	"Once Upon Our Time"	Lauren Christy; Graham Edwards; Kelly Levesque; Scott Spock	The Matrix	3:09
5.	"Chinese Whispers"	Bojanic; Faith; Hooper	The Wizardz of Oz	2:59
6.	"Mama's Little Girl"	Bojanic; Faith; Hooper	The Wizardz of Oz	3:43
7.	"Just the Way I Am"	Bojanic; Hooper; Helienne Lindvall	The Wizardz of Oz	2:59
8.	"Three Small Words"	Bojanic; Hooper	The Wizardz of Oz	4:26
9.	"Angel"	Christy; Edwards; Levesque; Spock	The Matrix	3:39
10.	"Love Is"	Kim Tribble; Shannon Brown; Tammy Hyler	The Center	3:42
11.	"To Forgive You"	Adrienne Follesé; Faith; Keith Follesé; Nick Trevisick	The Center	3:06
12.	"You Release Me"	K. Follesé; Levesque; Nina Ossoff	The Center	4:40

Japanese bonus tracks
No.	Title	Length
13.	"Ladies Night"	4:42
14.	"Love Song with a Twist"	3:16
15.	"How Can I Lie?"	4:11
16.	"Beyond the Wall"	3:54
17.	"Perfect for One Day"	4:18
18.	"Ghost"	3:47

== Singles ==
- "Just the Way I Am"
- "How Can I Lie" Week Of Nov 27 2004
- "Lessons in Love" Week Of Mar 26 2005
- "Love Song with a Twist"
- "Love Is"

== Charts ==
Hot Dance Club Play

- How Can I Lie Peak No. 48
- Lessons In Love Peak No. 41

== Release history ==
Region	Date	Format	Label	Ref.
United States	August 10, 2004	CD	Midas	
Japan	October 20, 2004	CD	Pony Canyon	

== Production ==
- Executive Producer: Mark Clapper
- A&R: Andrew Nast
