= Chris Ward (singer) =

American country music singer (born 1960)

- Born: June 27, 1960 (age 65); Bronx, New York City, New York
- Origin: Nashville, Tennessee
- Genres: Country
- Occupation: Singer
- Instrument: Vocals
- Years active: 1996
- Label: Giant

Chris Ward (born June 27, 1960 in The Bronx) is an American country music singer. A former police officer and bull rider, Ward signed to Giant Records in 1994. After recording demos, he wrote Confederate Railroad's 1995 single "See Ya".

Ward released his debut single "Fall Reaching" in 1996. Written by Robert Ellis Orrall and Josh Leo, and originally recorded by Orrall in the duo Orrall & Wright, the song received a favorable review from Billboard, whose Deborah Evans Price said that it "should go a long way toward helping Ward get through the clutter of competition at country radio." The song spent two weeks on the Hot Country Songs charts, peaking at number 68.

Stroud and Dann Huff co-produced Ward's debut album One Step Beyond. This album included the song "Only God (Could Stop Me Loving You)", co-written by Robert John "Mutt" Lange. Eric Zehnbauer of Country Standard Time gave the album a mostly-negative review, saying that it "shows too much of the cookie-cutter sameness that has plagued the recent 'hat act' stampede." Zehnbauer's review praised "Fall Reaching" and the up-tempo songs. "When You Get to Be You" was covered by Lisa Brokop on her 1998 album of the same name.

== Discography ==
=== One Step Beyond (1996) ===
One Step Beyond

Studio album by Chris Ward
- Released: August 7, 1996
- Genre: Country
- Length: 34:25
- Label: Giant
- Producer: Dann Huff and James Stroud

No.	Title	Writer(s)	Length
1.	"One Step Beyond"	Max T. Barnes, Keith Follesé	3:08
2.	"Mary Ann Is a Pistol"	Dennis Linde	3:18
3.	"Fall Reaching"	Robert Ellis Orrall, Josh Leo	3:24
4.	"When You Get to Be You"	Michael Dan Ehmig, Dennis Robbins, Curtis Wright	3:15
5.	"Love'll Do That"	Skip Ewing, Tim Johnson	3:53
6.	"Love Me to Death"	Tony Martin, Tom Shapiro, Scott Meeks	3:22
7.	"It All Started with a Lie"	Tim Mensy, Gary Harrison	3:24
8.	"Somewhere Between Goodbye and Gone"	Walt Aldridge, Bob DiPiero	3:29
9.	"Back to Earth"	Tim Johnson, Chris Ward, Kim Williams	3:19
10.	"Only God (Could Stop Me Loving You)"	Robert John "Mutt" Lange	3:59

=== Singles ===
Year	Single	Peak positions
Year	Single	US Country
1996	"Fall Reaching"	68
1996	"When You Get to Be You"	—
"—" denotes releases that did not chart

=== Music videos ===
Year	Title
1996	"Fall Reaching"
1996	"When You Get to Be You"
