= Countrified (Emerson Drive album) =

Studio album by Emerson Drive
- Released: September 19, 2006
- Genre: Country
- Length: 40:52
- Label: Midas
- Producers: Brad Allen; Keith Follesé; Teddy Gentry; Josh Leo

Emerson Drive chronology
What If? (2004)	Countrified (2006)	Believe (2009)

Professional ratings
Review scores
Source	Rating
Allmusic	4/5 stars

Countrified is the fifth studio album by Canadian country music band Emerson Drive. It was released in 2006 as their first issue for the Midas Records label. In the U.S., the album produced three singles on the Hot Country Songs charts: "A Good Man", "Moments" (the band's first Number One hit), and "You Still Own Me". Two of the album's tracks are covers: "You Still Own Me" was previously a hit in Canada for Johnny Reid, and "The Devil Went Down to Georgia" is a cover of a song made famous by the Charlie Daniels Band.

== Track listing ==
No.	Title	Writer(s)	Length
1.	"A Good Man"	Victoria Shaw, Adrienne Follesé, Keith Follesé	3:04
2.	"Testify"	Ronnie Rogers, Teddy Gentry, Josh Leo, Brad Mates	3:32
3.	"Moments"	Annie Tate, Sam Tate, Dave Berg	4:58
4.	"Sweet Natural Girl"	Kip Raines, Craig Wiseman, Jeffrey Steele	4:19
5.	"You Still Own Me"	Phillip Douglas, Noah Gordon, Johnny Reid	3:53
6.	"Lucky Man"	A. Tate, S. Tate, Berg	3:36
7.	"Everyday Woman"	Brian Dean Maher, Jeremy Stover	3:22
8.	"Countrified Soul"	Rogers, Gentry, Leo, Mates	3:00
9.	"Painted Too Much of This Town"	Michael White, K. Follesé, Wade Kirby	3:47
10.	"A Boy Becomes a Man"	A. Follesé, K. Follesé, Mates, Danick Dupelle	3:25
11.	"The Devil Went Down to Georgia"	Josh Crain, Fred Edwards, James Marshall, Charlie Daniels, Charles Hayward, William J. DiGregorio	3:56

== Personnel ==
Adapted from liner notes.

Emerson Drive

- Patrick Bourque - bass guitar
- Danick Dupelle - electric guitar, acoustic guitar, background vocals
- Brad Mates - lead vocals
- Mike Melancon - drums
- David Pichette - fiddle, mandolin
- Dale Wallace - piano, keyboards, organ, background vocals

Additional musicians

- Dave Hoffner - strings (track 3)
- Gordon Mote - strings (track 7)

Technical

- Brad Allen - producer (on tracks 1, 4, 5, 9, 10)
- Keith Follesé - producer (on tracks 1, 4, 5, 9, 10)
- Ben Fowler - mixing (track 11)
- Teddy Gentry - producer (all tracks except 1, 4, 5, 9, 10)
- Josh Leo - producer (all tracks except 1, 4, 5, 9, 10)
- Justin Niebank - mixing (except track 11)

== Charts ==
=== Weekly charts ===
Chart (2006)	Peak position
US Billboard 200	141
US Top Country Albums (Billboard)	30
US Top Heatseekers Albums (Billboard)	2
US Independent Albums (Billboard)	13

=== Year-end charts ===
Chart (2007)	Position
US Top Country Albums (Billboard)	70
