= Jon Wolfe =

American country music singer-songwriter

- Born: January 7, 1976 (age 50); Tulsa, Oklahoma
- Origin: New Braunfels, Texas
- Genres: Country
- Occupation: Singer-songwriter
- Years active: 2004–present
- Labels: Midas Records Nashville; Fool Hearted Productions; Warner Bros. Nashville; Tone Tree Music
- Website: www.jonwolfecountry.com

Jon Wolfe (born January 7, 1976) is an American country music singer and songwriter. Rising to prominence in the early 2000s, he's revered for his energetic performances and authentic style. His albums, including "It All Happened in a Honky Tonk" (2010), "Natural Man" (2015), and "Any Night in Texas" (2017), spawned hits such as "That Girl in Texas”, “I Don’t Dance”, and “Boots on a Dance Floor.”

== Career ==
Jon Wolfe was born in Tulsa, Oklahoma and raised in Miami, Oklahoma. He grew up singing in church and was first interested in classic pop music. His stepfather, a bass player in a house band with Joe Don Rooney, introduced him to country music.

Wolfe worked as an oil trader in Chicago, Illinois and transferred to Houston, Texas in 2003, where he roomed with Hayes Carll. He was inspired to become a working musician after attending an Alabama concert in Texas where he was invited on the tour bus and sang with Teddy Gentry and John Rich. He settled in Austin, Texas and became a regular performer on the Lone Star honky tonk circuit. He was nominated for Best Country Act in both Houston and Tulsa, Oklahoma and opened shows for Merle Haggard, Dwight Yoakam, Asleep at the Wheel and George Strait.

Wolfe self-released his debut album, Almost Gone, in November 2004. A 2006 show in Nashville, Tennessee led to a record deal with Midas Records Nashville. He recorded an album for the label produced by Keith Follesé and Brad Allen. The label went out of business in 2008 and the album went unreleased. "She Won't Be Lonely Long", which was scheduled to be the album's first single, became a top 5 song for Clay Walker in 2010.

Wolfe continued performing and wrote songs for himself and other artists. Joe Nichols recorded Wolfe's song "I Can't Take My Eyes Off You" on his 2011 album It's All Good. After a showcase performance at South by Southwest in 2010, Wolfe signed with Lex Music Group for management and formed his own record label, Fool Hearted Productions.

Wolfe released his second album, It All Happened in a Honky Tonk, in September 2010. Five singles were released from the album, all of which reached the top 10 on the Texas Music Chart. Music videos were filmed for four of the singles and they received a combined 1.2 million views on YouTube. The music video for the title track aired on CMT and GAC. Karlie Justus Marlowe of Engine 145 gave the album four stars out of five. Marlowe wrote that it "revels in its familiar take on bourbon, beauties and barrooms" and stated "there’s hardly a throwaway in the bunch." Matt Bjorke of Roughstock also awarded the album four stars out of five, writing that it "showcases a singer/songwriter with a penchant for writing and recording tunes that feel like a good pair of comfortable Wrangler jeans."

In September 2012, Wolfe signed a recording contract with Warner Bros. Nashville. Warner released a deluxe edition of It All Happened in a Honky Tonk in January 2013 with three new songs. The deluxe edition debuted at number 52 on the Billboard Top Country Albums chart. It went on to sell 25,000 copies. A live version of the album, It All Happened Live in a Honky Tonk from Floore's Country Store, was released by Wolfe's Fool Hearted Productions in October.

After the release of the deluxe edition, Wolfe parted ways with Warner and signed with Tone Tree Music. He began working on his third studio album, Natural Man. The album was released on March 31, 2015. Natural Man received a favorable review from Dustin Blumhagen of Country Standard Time, who said that Wolfe "manages to find a comfortable balance between honoring his roots and adding a modern accessibility to his songs." The album debuted at number 25 on the Billboard Top Country Albums chart, selling 2,200 copies in its first week of release.

In June 2017, Wolfe released the album Any Night in Texas. The album debuted at No. 6 in the Billboard's Heatseekers Albums chart and No. 14 in the Independent Albums chart, selling 2,400 copies in the first week.

== Discography ==
=== Albums ===
Title	Album details	Peak chart positions		
Title	Album details	US Country	US Heat	US Indie
Almost Gone	Release date: November 1, 2004; Label: Jon Wolfe	—	—	—
It All Happened in a Honky Tonk	Release date: September 7, 2010; Label: Fool Hearted Productions	—	—	—
It All Happened in a Honky Tonk (Deluxe Edition)	Release date: January 15, 2013; Label: ILG/Warner Bros. Nashville	52	34	—
It All Happened Live in a Honky Tonk from Floore's Country Store	Release date: October 15, 2013; Label: Fool Hearted Productions	—	—	—
Natural Man	Release date: March 31, 2015; Label: Tone Tree Music	25	7	32
Any Night in Texas	Release date: June 16, 2017; Label: Fool Hearted Productions	—	6	14
Dos Corazones	Release date: September 1, 2021; Label: Fool Hearted Productions	—	—	—
Barstool Therapy (Session One)	Release date: November 7, 2025; Label: Fool Hearted Productions	—	—	—
"—" denotes releases that did not chart

=== Singles ===
Year	Single	Album
2014	"What Are You Doin' Right Now"	Natural Man
2015	"Smile on Mine"	Natural Man
2015	"Don't It Feel Good"	Natural Man
2016	"Boots On The Dance Floor"	Any Night in Texas
2017	"Baby This And Baby That"	Any Night in Texas
2018	"Airport Kiss"	Any Night in Texas
2018	"Any Night in Texas"	Any Night in Texas

=== Music videos ===
Year	Video	Director
2011	"That Girl in Texas"	Mason Dixon
2011	"I Don't Dance"	David Dutton
2012	"It All Happened in a Honky Tonk"	David Dutton
2013	"The Only Time You Call"	Mason Dixon
2014	"What Are You Doin' Right Now"	Mason Dixon
2015	"Smile on Mine"	Patrick Tracy
2015	"Don't It Feel Good"	Steve Condon
2017	"Baby This and Baby That"	Justin Key
2018	"Any Night In Texas"	Justin Key
