= Roll (Emerson Drive album) =

Studio album by Emerson Drive
- Released: October 30, 2012
- Genre: Country
- Length: 39:55
- Label: Open Road
- Producer: David Kalmusky

Emerson Drive chronology
Decade of Drive (2011)	Roll (2012)	Tilt-a-Whirl (2015)

Singles from Roll
- 1. "She's My Kind of Crazy" Released: July 9, 2012; 2. "Let It Roll" Released: October 23, 2012; 3. "With You" Released: March 2013; 4. "She Always Gets What She Wants" Released: June 2013

Professional ratings
Review scores
Source	Rating
Roughstock	4/5 stars

Roll is the seventh studio album by Canadian country music group Emerson Drive. It was released on October 30, 2012 via Open Road Recordings. The album's first single, "She's My Kind of Crazy," reached the top forty on the Canadian Hot 100.

Roll was nominated for Country Album of the Year at the 2013 Juno Awards. It was also nominated for Album of the Year at the 2013 Canadian Country Music Association Awards.

== Track listing ==
No.	Title	Writer(s)	Length
1.	"Let It Roll" (with Doc Walker)	Brad Mates, Chris Thorsteinson, Danick Dupelle, Dave Wasyliw	3:57
2.	"We Are This Town"	Mates, Dupelle, Tebey	3:40
3.	"Love Hangover"	Mates, Dupelle, Tebey	4:26
4.	"She Always Gets What She Wants"	Dupelle, Patricia Conroy, Tebey	3:54
5.	"Never a Good Day for Goodbye"	Warren Huart, Tebey	4:09
6.	"With You"	Dupelle, Kathleen Higgins, Tebey	3:05
7.	"We Fit Together"	Mates, Dupelle, Tebey	3:21
8.	"This Is Our Time"	Mates, Dupelle, Tim Nicolas	3:05
9.	"Alone Tonight"	Dupelle, Jason McCoy, Tebey	3:35
10.	"She's My Kind of Crazy"	Arlo Gilliam, Bobby Pinson, Mates, Dupelle	3:21
11.	"Show Us Whatcha Got"	Mates, Dupelle, David Kalmusky, David Pichette, Matthew Anderson, Mike Melancon, Wade Jackson	3:22
Total length:			39:55

== Chart performance ==
=== Album ===
Chart (2013)	Peak position
US Top Country Albums (Billboard)	62

=== Singles ===
Year	Single	Peak chart positions	
Year	Single	CAN Country	CAN
2012	"She's My Kind of Crazy"	—	37
2012	"Let It Roll" (with Doc Walker)	10	61
2013	"With You"	12	—
2013	"She Always Gets What She Wants"	17	—
"—" denotes releases that did not chart
