= Coming Home (Lonestar album) =

Studio album by Lonestar
- Released: September 13, 2005
- Recorded: 2005
- Studio: Emerald Entertainment (Nashville, Tennessee); Sound Kitchen (Franklin, Tennessee)
- Genre: Country; pop; rock
- Length: 44:08
- Label: BNA
- Producer: Justin Niebank

Lonestar chronology
Let's Be Us Again (2004)	Coming Home (2005)	Mountains (2006)

Singles from Coming Home
- 1. "You're Like Comin' Home" Released: June 13, 2005; 2. "I'll Die Tryin'" Released: November 28, 2005

Professional ratings
Review scores
Source	Rating
About.com	5/5 stars
AllMusic	2/5 stars
People	3/4 stars
USA Today	2.5/4 stars

Coming Home is the seventh studio album by American country music group Lonestar, released in 2005 on BNA Records. This album produced two singles for them on the Billboard Hot Country Songs charts: "You're Like Coming Home" (No. 8) and "I'll Die Tryin'" (No. 43). Both of these songs were originally recorded by the Canadian country band Emerson Drive on their 2004 album What If?.

== Track listing ==
No.	Title	Writer(s)	Length
1.	"You're Like Comin' Home"	Brandon Kinney; Brian Dean Maher; Jeremy Stover	4:00
2.	"Doghouse"	Britton Cameron; Jack Sizemore; Jeff Stevens	3:04
3.	"I Am a Man"	Tom Douglas; Aimee Mayo; Rivers Rutherford	4:25
4.	"I'll Die Tryin'"	Steve Bogard; Stover	4:02
5.	"Wild"	Bob DiPiero; Richie McDonald; Tom Shapiro	3:57
6.	"Noise"	Michael Britt; Brett James	3:22
7.	"Little Town"	Danny Orton; Jennifer Schott	3:08
8.	"I Never Needed You"	Tommy Lee James; McDonald	3:40
9.	"What's Wrong with That"	McDonald; Frank J. Myers; Don Pfrimmer	3:17
10.	"Two Bottles of Beer"	Ron Harbin; McDonald	4:01
11.	"I Just Want to Love You"	B. James; Dean Sams	4:07
12.	"When I Go Home Again"	Walt Aldridge; Gary Baker; McDonald	2:59

== Personnel ==
=== Lonestar ===
- Richie McDonald – lead vocals
- Dean Sams – acoustic piano, clavinet, Hammond B3 organ, synthesizers, backing vocals
- Michael Britt – acoustic guitar, electric guitars, bouzouki
- Keech Rainwater – drums, percussion

=== Additional musicians ===
- Tim Lauer – accordion
- Gordon Mote – acoustic piano, Wurlitzer electric piano, Hammond B3 organ, wah wah clavinet
- Bryan Sutton – acoustic guitar, mandolin
- John Willis – acoustic guitar
- Russ Pahl – electric guitars, dobro, steel guitar
- Bruce Bouton – dobro, steel guitar
- Jonathan Yudkin – mandolin
- Stuart Duncan – fiddle, mandolin
- Aubrey Haynie – fiddle
- Michael Rhodes – bass guitar
- Shannon Forrest – drums
- Chris McHugh – drums
- Robbie Cheuvront – backing vocals
- Sara Evans – backing vocals

=== Production ===
- Justin Niebank – producer, recording, mixing
- Drew Bollman – engineer, digital editing
- Scott Kidd – additional engineer
- Brian David Willis – digital editing
- Jim DeMain – mastering at Yes Master (Nashville, Tennessee)
- Mike "Frog" Griffith – production coordinator
- Astrid Herbold May – art direction, design
- S. Wade Hunt – art direction, design
- Chapman Baehler – photography
- Melanie Shelley – grooming
- Penny Arth – stylist

== Charts ==
Chart (2005)	Peak position
US Billboard 200	26
US Top Country Albums (Billboard)	3
