= She's My Kind of Crazy =

Single by Emerson Drive

from the album Roll
- Released: July 9, 2012
- Genre: Country
- Length: 3:22
- Label: Open Road
- Songwriters: Danick Dupelle; Arlo Gilliam; Brad Mates; Bobby Pinson
- Producer: David Kalmusky

Emerson Drive singles chronology
"Sleep It Off" (2011)	"She's My Kind of Crazy" (2012)	"Let It Roll" (2012)

Music video
- "She's My Kind of Crazy" on YouTube

"She's My Kind of Crazy" is a song recorded by Canadian country music group Emerson Drive. It was released in July 2012 as the first single from their album Roll. The song reached the top forty on the Canadian Hot 100.

== Music video ==
The music video was directed by David Pichette and premiered in July 2012. It features 2012 Miss Arizona USA Erika Frantzve (who is now known as Erika Kirk) as the love interest.

== Chart performance ==
"She's My Kind of Crazy" peaked at number 37 on the Canadian Hot 100 for the week of August 18, 2012.

Chart (2012)	Peak position
Canada (Canadian Hot 100)	37
Canada Country (Billboard)	8

== Certifications ==
Region	Certification
Canada (Music Canada)	Gold

== Later repercussion ==
Following the assassination of Charlie Kirk (whom Frantzve would eventually marry) on September 10, 2025, the music video experienced a resurgence on social media which centred on the video's female lead, played by Frantzve. The video's resurfacing was propelled by conspiracy theorists who pointed to perceived coincidences within the decade-old music video. Specifically, users highlighted a scene where Frantzve ziplines past a sign displaying the numbers "9:10"—matching the date of Kirk's death (September 10)—and noted that Frantzve had originally commented on the video thanking a crew member named "Tyler," which happened to be the first name of Kirk's accused assassin. These connections were dismissed as coincidental by mainstream media.
