= Angel Faith =

American singer

- Born: Angel Marie Faith; Burbank, California, U.S.
- Genres: Pop; R&B; dance-pop
- Occupations: Singer, Dancer, Psychologist
- Instruments: Vocals
- Years active: 2000–2007
- Labels: Jive (2000–2003); Midas (2003–2007)
- Website: drangelfaith.com

Angel Marie Faith, known by the mononym Angel, is an American singer, dancer, and psychologist. She is best known as a member of the girl group No Secrets, which formed in 2000. Faith sang half of the lead vocals in No Secrets. She left the group in 2003, pursuing a solo career, and released her debut studio album Believe in Angels Believe in Me (2004).

Faith retired from music in 2007. As of 2020, she works as a clinical psychologist at a hospital in Los Angeles, California.

== Early years ==
Faith began performing at a young age. At age 4, she took ballet, vocal coaching and various other performing arts classes.

== Music career ==
=== 2000–2003: No Secrets ===
In 2000, Faith became a member of No Secrets, the fourth girl to join the group, singing lead vocals alongside Jessica Fried. She sang the lead vocals on half of the songs on the group's self-titled debut album. The other members were Erin Tanner, Carly Lewis and Jade Ryusaki. Their first single, "That's What Girls Do", was a hit and was also used in The Powerpuff Girls Movie, and later that year, was used in The Hot Chick.

In 2002 after much success with the group, they toured alongside Aaron Carter on his "Oh Aaron tour" as a part of a Jive Records collaboration. No Secrets made an appearance at the fifteenth annual 2002 Kids' Choice Awards, and filmed three more music videos after this.

In 2003, the group recorded a cover of Atomic Kitten's hit single "Whole Again" without Faith, who then left the group to pursue a solo career. In early 2004, the remaining four members of No Secrets recorded "Once Upon a Dream" for the DVD release of Disney's Sleeping Beauty and Disneymania 2. The group parted ways shortly thereafter in 2005.

=== 2003–2005: Solo project and Believe in Angels ===
After Faith left No Secrets in early 2003, she was quickly signed to Midas Records where she began singing and writing an entire new selection of songs of her own. She released a new single "That's Just the Way I Am" in early 2004 before the release of her first studio album Believe in Angels Believe in Me. Despite a successful launch of the album, the album was poorly received by critics and failed to chart. Faith went on tour touring the west coast of the United States. The Tour was for promotional purposes and served as a message about her new style of music. She went to over 150 different middle and high schools where she performed selected songs from her album (and some songs from her upcoming second album) for the students. This tour increased her album's popularity as well with the teenage audience. After the tour ended she did not take a break and immediately began getting ready to release more work. In late 2004, OPI Products released a new shade of Angel Pink nail polish called Nicole which was inspired by the singer.

=== 2005–2007: Twisted and musical retirement ===
After coming back from a six-month tour, Faith returned and began recording a second album. Her new collection of songs included new releases and old leftover tracks from "Believe in Angels". She worked with a new staff of producers at Midas and was promoted as one of the company's representative singers. After spending over a year of recording and releasing a few singles the album was never released. Faith later announced via her official website that she was retiring from the music industry to follow her dreams of higher education. Faith then went on to pursue a B.A. at UCLA in psychology. She graduated magna cum laude in June 2009. She later completed her Master's and Doctoral degree in clinical psychology at Pepperdine University. Faith is currently working as a practicing clinical psychologist.

== Discography ==
=== Studio album ===
- Believe in Angels Believe in Me (2004)

=== Singles ===
- "Just the Way I Am" (June 14, 2004)
- "Believe in Angels"
- "Love Is" (August 16, 2004)
- "How Can I Lie" (November 27, 2004)
- "It All Started with a Child" (November 29, 2004)
- "Lessons in Love"
- "Missing You"
- "Secret Admirer"
