= You're Like Comin' Home =

Single by Lonestar

from the album Coming Home
- Released: June 13, 2005
- Genre: Country pop; pop rock
- Length: 4:00 (album version); 3:15 (radio edit)
- Label: BNA
- Songwriters: Brandon Kinney; Brian Dean Maher; Jeremy Stover
- Producer: Justin Niebank

Lonestar singles chronology
"Class Reunion (That Used to Be Us)" (2005)	"You're Like Comin' Home" (2005)	"I'll Die Tryin'" (2006)

"You're Like Comin' Home" is a song recorded by American country music group Lonestar and it was released in June 2005 as the lead single from their sixth studio album Coming Home. The song peaked at number 8 on the U.S. Billboard Hot Country Songs chart. It was written by Brandon Kinney, Brian Dean Maher and Jeremy Stover.

== Music video ==
The music video was directed by Trey Fanjoy and premiered in mid-2005.

== Chart performance ==
"You're Like Comin' Home" debuted at number 51 on the U.S. Billboard Hot Country Songs chart for the week of June 18, 2005.

Chart (2005)	Peak position
Canada Country (Radio & Records)	7
US Hot Country Songs (Billboard)	8
US Billboard Hot 100	63

=== Year-end charts ===
Chart (2005)	Position
US Country Songs (Billboard)	40

== Other versions ==
Canadian country music band Emerson Drive originally recorded this song, (under the title "You're Like Coming Home") on their 2004 album, What If? Their version was not released as a single, unlike Lonestar's version. A live recording of Emerson Drive's version was released as a digital single in 2005.
