= Beautiful Life (Doc Walker album) =

Studio album by Doc Walker
- Released: April 29, 2008
- Genre: Country
- Length: 37:14
- Label: Open Road
- Producer: Justin Niebank

Doc Walker chronology
Doc Walker (2006)	Beautiful Life (2008)	Go (2009)

Singles from Beautiful Life
- 1. "Beautiful Life" Released: February 18, 2008; 2. "That's All" Released: June 16, 2008; 3. "One Last Sundown" Released: October 27, 2008

Beautiful Life is the fifth studio album by Canadian country music group Doc Walker. The album was named Album of the Year at the 2008 Canadian Country Music Association Awards. It also won the 2009 Juno Award for Country Recording of the Year.

== Track listing ==
No.	Title	Writer(s)	Length
1.	"Beautiful Life"	Chris Thorsteinson, Dave Wasyliw, Murray Pulver	3:40
2.	"Echo Road"	Thorsteinson, Wasyliw, Pulver	3:25
3.	"That's All"	Tony Banks, Mike Rutherford, Phil Collins	3:49
4.	"Angry Heart"	Radney Foster, Stephany Delray	4:13
5.	"One Last Sundown"	Jon Mabe, Thorsteinson, Wasyliw	4:21
6.	"On the Heels of a Heartache"	Thorsteinson, Wasyliw, Pulver	3:37
7.	"Annabelle"	Thorsteinson, Wasyliw, Pulver	3:19
8.	"A Little Love Along the Way"	Deric Ruttan, Thorsteinson, Wasyliw, Pulver	3:43
9.	"Without Your Love"	Carolyn Dawn Johnson, Pulver	3:31
10.	"Stay Brave"	Darrell Brown, Thorsteinson, Wasyliw, Pulver	3:36

== Chart performance ==
=== Singles ===
Year	Single	Peak positions
Year	Single	CAN
2008	"Beautiful Life"	61
2008	"That's All"	68
2008	"One Last Sundown"	82
