= Believe (Emerson Drive album) =

Studio album by Emerson Drive
- Released: May 5, 2009
- Genre: Country
- Length: 35:02
- Label: Midas/Valory Music Group
- Producers: Teddy Gentry; Josh Leo

Emerson Drive chronology
Countrified (2006)	Believe (2009)	Decade of Drive (2011)

Singles from Believe
- 1. "Belongs to You" Released: November 17, 2008; 2. "Believe" Released: March 2009; 3. "I Love This Road" Released: July 6, 2009; 4. "The Extra Mile" Released: November 23, 2009; 5. "That Kind of Beautiful" Released: June 14, 2010

Believe is the sixth studio album by Canadian country music group Emerson Drive. The album was released in Canada on May 5, 2009 via Midas/Valory/Open Road. The album's first single, "Belongs to You," reached the top forty on the Billboard Hot Country Songs chart in the United States.

== Critical reception ==
Professional ratings
Review scores
Source	Rating
AllMusic	3.5/5 stars
The 9513	1/5 stars

The album received mixed reviews from music critics. It received a three-and-a-half star rating from Todd Sterling of AllMusic, who said that the album was "slickly produced" and that it "sticks to the well-worn formula of the group's previous releases," but said that it had "every color of the musical rainbow." Sterling cited "Your Last" as a standout, calling it a "lump-in-the-throat masterpiece." Jim Malec of The 9513 gave it one star out of five, referring to the song's lyrics as largely cliché in nature and saying, "There is not a single song on Believe worth hearing. It is an entirely disposable album that is unoriginal, uninteresting and unnecessary." Malec also criticized the album's sound, saying that the mixing of instruments and Brad Mates' vocals did not seem cohesive.

== Track listing ==
No.	Title	Writer(s)	Length
1.	"That Kind of Beautiful"	Luke Laird, Hillary Lindsey, Gordie Sampson	3:11
2.	"Believe"	Josh Leo, Shawn Colvin	3:50
3.	"Belongs to You"	Dave Berg, Rivers Rutherford, Tom Shapiro	3:48
4.	"I Love This Road"	Brad Mates, Tommy Lee James	3:46
5.	"Livin' It Up"	Marty Dodson, Jason Sellers, Jimmy Yeary	3:04
6.	"Your Last"	Lisa Carver, Laird	3:43
7.	"Life Down Here"	Mates, Leo, Tim Nichols	3:07
8.	"The Extra Mile"	Bonnie Baker, Paul Sikes	4:09
9.	"Too Much"	Danick Dupelle, Mates, Adrienne Follesé, Keith Follesé	3:18
10.	"That Was Us"	Dupelle, Mates, Berg, Michael Mobley	3:06

== Chart performance ==
=== Singles ===
Year	Single	Peak chart positions	
Year	Single	CAN	US Country
2008	"Belongs to You"	73	32
2009	"Believe"	73	—
2009	"I Love This Road"	86	—
2009	"The Extra Mile"	96	—
2010	"That Kind of Beautiful"	80	—
"—" denotes releases that did not chart

== Release history ==
Region	Date	Format
Canada	May 5, 2009	CD, digital download
United States	April 2011	digital download
