= That Kind of Beautiful =

Single by Emerson Drive

from the album Believe
- Released: June 14, 2010 (Canada); August 16, 2010 (US)
- Genre: Country
- Length: 3:11
- Label: Amdian Music Co. Nine North Records
- Songwriters: Luke Laird; Hillary Lindsey; Gordie Sampson
- Producers: Teddy Gentry; Josh Leo

Emerson Drive singles chronology
"The Extra Mile" (2009)	"That Kind of Beautiful" (2010)	"When I See You Again" (2010)

"That Kind of Beautiful" is a country music song written by Luke Laird, Hillary Lindsey and Gordie Sampson. It was recorded by the Canadian band Emerson Drive on their 2009 Believe. Sister Hazel released a version of the song in 2016 as part of their country album Lighter in the Dark.

== Music video ==
The music video was directed by the band's fiddle player, David Pichette, and was released on June 13, 2010. It was filmed in March 2010 and features Pichette's daughter, lead singer Brad Mates' wife, and drummer Mike Melancon's wife.

== Chart positions ==
Chart (2010)	Peak position
Canada Hot 100 (Billboard)	80
