= Go (Doc Walker album) =

Studio album by Doc Walker
- Released: September 8, 2009
- Genre: Country
- Length: 37:22
- Label: Open Road

Doc Walker chronology
Beautiful Life (2008)	Go (2009)	16 & 1 (2011)

Singles from Go
- 1. "Coming Home" Released: June 1, 2009; 2. "If I Fall" Released: October 5, 2009; 3. "I'm Gonna Make You Love Me" Released: March 8, 2010; 4. "From Here" Released: August 16, 2010

Go is the sixth studio album by Canadian country music group Doc Walker. It was released on September 8, 2009 by Open Road Recordings and includes the single "Coming Home."

== Track listing ==
No.	Title	Writer(s)	Length
1.	"Coming Home"	Chris Thorsteinson, Dave Wasyliw, Murray Pulver	4:15
2.	"Speed of Life"	Thorsteinson, Wasyliw, Pulver, Bruce Wallace	3:02
3.	"If I Fall"	Thorsteinson, Wasyliw, Pulver	4:01
4.	"Why"	Tebey, Eric Paslay, Terry Sawchuk	3:10
5.	"The Hard Way"	Thorsteinson, Wasyliw, Pulver	3:37
6.	"I'm Gonna Make You Love Me"	Thorsteinson, Wasyliw, Pulver, Victoria Banks	2:56
7.	"From Here"	Thorsteinson, Wasyliw, Pulver	3:29
8.	"Girls in Their Summer Clothes"	Bruce Springsteen	4:46
9.	"Go"	Thorsteinson, Wasyliw, Pulver	4:09
10.	"Dancing All Night"	Thorsteinson, Wasyliw, Pulver	3:57

== Chart performance ==
=== Singles ===
Year	Single	Peak positions
Year	Single	CAN
2009	"Coming Home"	80
2009	"If I Fall"	78
2010	"I'm Gonna Make You Love Me"	87
2010	"From Here"	100
