= Only God (Could Stop Me Loving You) =

Single by Emerson Drive

from the album Emerson Drive
- B-side: "Fall into Me"
- Released: March 17, 2003
- Genre: Country
- Length: 4:16 (album version); 3:39 (radio edit)
- Label: DreamWorks
- Songwriter: Robert John "Mutt" Lange
- Producers: Julian King; James Stroud

Emerson Drive singles chronology
"Fall into Me" (2002)	"Only God (Could Stop Me Loving You)" (2003)	"Waitin' on Me" (2003)

"Only God (Could Stop Me Loving You)" is a song written by Robert John "Mutt" Lange that has been recorded by multiple artists. It was first recorded by American country music artist Billy Ray Cyrus for his third studio album Storm in the Heartland (1994). It was then recorded by Chris Ward for his only studio album One Step Beyond (1996). Lari White would also record a version, this time as a duet with Toby Keith, for her fourth studio album Stepping Stone (1998).

The first artist to release it as a single was Canadian band Emerson Drive. Their version was released on March 17, 2003, as the third and final single from their self-titled major label debut album (third album overall). It was not as successful as the previous singles, peaking at number 23 on the US Hot Country Songs chart.

== Music video ==
The music video was directed by Steven Goldmann and premiered in mid-2003.

== Charts ==
Emerson Drive's version peaked at number 23 on the US Hot Country Songs chart, spending twenty-four weeks on that chart.

Chart (2003)	Peak position
US Bubbling Under Hot 100 (Billboard)	24
US Hot Country Songs (Billboard)	23

=== Year-end charts ===
Chart (2003)	Position
US Country Songs (Billboard)	83
