= Belongs to You =

Single by Emerson Drive

from the album Believe
- Released: November 17, 2008
- Genre: Country
- Length: 3:31 (radio edit); 3:51 (album version)
- Label: Midas/Valory
- Songwriters: Dave Berg; Rivers Rutherford; Tom Shapiro
- Producers: Teddy Gentry; Josh Leo

Emerson Drive singles chronology
"Everyday Woman" (2008)	"Belongs to You" (2008)	"Believe" (2009)

"Belongs to You" is a song written by Dave Berg, Rivers Rutherford and Tom Shapiro, and recorded by Canadian country music band Emerson Drive. It was released in November 2008 as the lead-off single to their sixth studio album Believe, released in Canada on May 5, 2009 via Midas Records Nashville and The Valory Music Group, the latter is an imprint of Big Machine Records.

== Content ==
"Belongs to You" is a mid-tempo ballad in which the male narrator describes the personal sacrifices that he had made in his life for his lover.

== Critical reception ==
Matt Bjorke of Roughstock described the song favorably. He described it as "a sweetly romantic power ballad that is sure to become a smash hit wedding track in 2009".

== Music video ==
The music video was directed by Steven Goldmann.

== Chart performance ==
"Belongs to You" debuted at number 60 on the U.S. Billboard Hot Country Songs chart dated November 29, 2008.

Chart (2008–2009)	Peak position
Canada Hot 100 (Billboard)	73
US Hot Country Songs (Billboard)	32

== Cover versions ==
Jimmy Wayne covered the song for his 2009 studio album Sara Smile.
