= 16 & 1 =

Studio album by Doc Walker
- Released: August 29, 2011
- Genre: Country
- Length: 36:43
- Label: Open Road
- Producer: John Ellis

Doc Walker chronology
| Go (2009) | 16 & 1 (2011) | Remember December (2011) |

Singles from 16 & 1
- 1. "Country Girl" Released: June 13, 2011; 2. "Do It Right" Released: September 19, 2011; 3. "Where I Belong" Released: March 12, 2012

Professional ratings
Review scores
| Source | Rating |
|---|---|
| Winnipeg Free Press | 3.5/5 stars |

16 & 1 is the seventh studio album by Canadian country music group Doc Walker. It was released on August 29, 2011 by Open Road Recordings. The album includes covers of Bob Seger's "Get Out of Denver" and the Crash Test Dummies' "I Think I'll Disappear Now."

16 & 1 was nominated for Country Album of the Year at the 2012 Juno Awards.

== Track listing ==
| No. | Title | Length |
|---|---|---|
| 1. | "Are You with Me Tonight" | 3:56 |
| 2. | "Do It Again" | 3:16 |
| 3. | "Never Letting Go" | 3:36 |
| 4. | "Where I Belong" | 4:03 |
| 5. | "Country Girl" | 3:30 |
| 6. | "Hard Act to Follow" | 3:46 |
| 7. | "Get Out of Denver" | 2:50 |
| 8. | "Do It Right" | 3:55 |
| 9. | "I Think I'll Disappear Now" (featuring Brad Roberts) | 3:48 |
| 10. | "Tailgate Revolution" | 4:03 |

== Chart performance ==
=== Singles ===
| Year | Single | Peak positions |
| Year | Single | CAN |
|---|---|---|
| 2011 | "Country Girl" | — |
| 2011 | "Do It Right" | — |
| 2012 | "Where I Belong" | 96 |
"—" denotes releases that did not chart
