= Let It Roll (Emerson Drive song) =

Single by Emerson Drive with Doc Walker

from the album Roll
- Released: October 23, 2012
- Genre: Country
- Length: 3:57
- Label: Open Road
- Songwriter(s): Brad Mates; Chris Thorsteinson; Danick Dupelle; Dave Wasyliw
- Producer(s): David Kalmusky

Emerson Drive singles chronology
"She's My Kind of Crazy" (2012)	"Let It Roll" (2012)	"With You" (2013)

Doc Walker singles chronology
"Where I Belong" (2012)	"Let It Roll" (2012)	"Put It Into Drive" (2013)

"Let It Roll" is a song recorded by the Canadian country music groups Emerson Drive and Doc Walker. It was released in October 2012 as the second single from Emerson Drive's seventh studio album, Roll. It peaked at number 61 on the Canadian Hot 100 in February 2013.

== Music video ==
The music video was directed by David Pichette and was premiered in November 2012.

== Chart performance ==
"Let It Roll" debuted at number 91 on the Canadian Hot 100 for the week of January 26, 2013.

Chart (2013)	Peak position
Canada (Canadian Hot 100)	61
Canada Country (Billboard)	10
