= Remember December (EP) =

EP by Doc Walker
- Released: November 7, 2011
- Genre: Country
- Length: 14:38
- Label: Open Road

Doc Walker chronology
16 & 1 (2011)	Remember December (2011)	The 8th (2014)

Remember December is the first EP and Christmas album by Canadian country music group Doc Walker. The album was released on November 7, 2011.

== Track listing ==
No.	Title	Writer(s)	Length
1.	"Remember December"	Willie Mack, Chris Thorsteinson, Dave Wasyliw	4:00
2.	"Merry Christmas to All"	Gerald O'Brien, Thorsteinson, Wasyliw	3:23
3.	"It Don't Feel Much Like Christmas"	Stacy Widelitz, Thorsteinson, Wasyliw	2:39
4.	"The Christmas Song"	Mel Tormé, Bob Wells	4:39
