= A Good Man (song) =

Single by Emerson Drive

from the album Countrified
- B-side: "Moments"
- Released: March 13, 2006
- Genre: Country, country rock
- Length: 3:04
- Label: Midas
- Songwriters: Victoria Shaw, Adrienne Follesé, Keith Follesé
- Producers: Brad Allen, Keith Follesé

Emerson Drive singles chronology
"Still Got Yesterday" (2005)	"A Good Man" (2006)	"Countrified Soul" (2006)

"A Good Man" is a song written by Victoria Shaw, Keith Follesé and Adrienne Follesé, and recorded by Canadian country music band Emerson Drive. It was released in March 2006 as the first single from their album Countrified. The song reached the Top 20 on the U.S. Billboard Hot Country Songs chart in 2006, peaking at number 17.

== Content ==
The narrator is a man reflecting on what he wants people to think of him after he dies.

== Music video ==
The music video was directed by Steven Goldmann, and premiered on CMT in the summer of 2006. It was filmed primarily at Hoffmeyer's Mill in Sebringville, Ontario, Canada.

== Personnel ==
- Brad Mates - lead vocals
- Danick Dupelle - acoustic guitar, electric guitar, backing vocals
- Mike Melancon - drums
- Patrick Bourque - bass guitar, backing vocals
- Dale Wallace - keyboards, backing vocals
- David Pichette - fiddle

== Charts ==
Chart (2006)	Peak position
US Hot Country Songs (Billboard)	17
US Billboard Bubbling Under Hot 100	20
