= Last One Standing (Emerson Drive song) =

Single by Emerson Drive

from the album What If?
- B-side: "Rescued"
- Released: January 19, 2004
- Recorded: 2003
- Genre: Country
- Length: 3:39 (album version); 3:30 (single version)
- Label: DreamWorks
- Songwriter(s): Richard Marx; Fee Waybill
- Producer(s): Richard Marx

Emerson Drive singles chronology
"Waitin' on Me" (2003)	"Last One Standing" (2004)	"November" (2004)

"Last One Standing" is a song by the Canadian country music group Emerson Drive. It was produced and co-written by American musician Richard Marx, with extra writing from Fee Waybill. It was released on January 19, 2004, as the second single to their fourth studio album (second as Emerson Drive) What If? (2004).

It reached a peak position of number 21 on the US Hot Country Songs chart, becoming their fourth top-30 hit. It also briefly charted at number 89 on the Billboard Hot 100 and number 25 on the Radio & Records Canada Country chart.

== Music video ==
Trey Fanjoy, who directed the video for "Fall into Me", directed the video for "Last One Standing". It debuted to CMT on January 25, 2004.

== Track listing ==
CD single
No.	Title	Writer(s)	Length
1.	"Last One Standing"	Richard Marx; Fee Waybill	3:30
2.	"Rescued" (Single Version)	Brett James; Tom McHugh; Bryan Wayne	3:53

== Charts ==
Chart (2004)	Peak position
Canada Country (Radio & Records)	25
US Hot Country Songs (Billboard)	21
US Billboard Hot 100	89

=== Year-end charts ===
Chart (2004)	Position
US Country Songs (Billboard)	80
