= The 8th (Doc Walker album) =

Studio album by Doc Walker
- Released: October 21, 2014
- Genre: Country
- Length: 33:32
- Label: Open Road
- Producer: Gavin Brown; Justin Niebank

Doc Walker chronology
Remember December (2011)	The 8th (2014)	Echo Road – The Best of Doc Walker (2016)

Singles from The 8th
- 1. "Put It into Drive" Released: March 12, 2013; 2. "Shake It Like It's Saturday Night" Released: April 8, 2014; 3. "That's How I Like It" Released: August 19, 2014; 4. "That's What I Call Love" Released: January 2015

The 8th is the eighth studio album by Canadian country music group Doc Walker. It was released on October 21, 2014 by Open Road Recordings. The album includes the singles "Put It into Drive", "Shake It Like It's Saturday Night" and "That's How I Like It".

== Track listing ==
No.	Title	Writer(s)	Length
1.	"Put It into Drive"	Phil Barton, Jeff Cohen, Ross Copperman	3:49
2.	"Western Wind"	Mike Plume, Chris Thorsteinson, Dave Wasyliw	3:42
3.	"That's How I Like It"	Nathan Chapman, Lori McKenna, Liz Rose	3:01
4.	"It Won't Hurt (If My Heart Don't Know)"	Murray Pulver, Thorsteinson, Wasyliw	3:25
5.	"Park the Car"	Gavin Brown, Thorsteinson, Wasyliw	3:23
6.	"Shake It Like It's Saturday Night"	Thorsteinson, Wasyliw	3:23
7.	"That's What I Call Love"	Thorsteinson, Wasyliw	3:43
8.	"Some Girls Are Meant to Run"	Thorsteinson, Bruce Wallace, Wasyliw	3:10
9.	"Leave It All On the Dance Floor"	Brown, Neil Sanderson, Thorsteinson, Wasyliw	2:40
10.	"Celebration"	Robert Ellis Orrall, Thorsteinson, Wasyliw	3:16
Total length:			33:32

== Chart performance ==
=== Singles ===
Year	Single	Peak positions
Year	Single	CAN Country
2013	"Put It into Drive"	12
2014	"Shake It Like It's Saturday Night"	36
2014	"That's How I Like It"	12
2015	"That's What I Call Love"	—
"—" denotes releases that did not chart
