= Doc Walker (album) =

Studio album by Doc Walker
- Released: November 7, 2006
- Genre: Country music
- Length: 44:13
- Label: Open Road
- Producer: Justin Niebank

Doc Walker chronology
Everyone Aboard (2003)	Doc Walker (2006)	Beautiful Life (2008)

Doc Walker is the fourth studio album by Canadian country music group Doc Walker. The album was named Album of the Year in 2007 by the Canadian Country Music Association, and was also nominated for Country Recording of the Year at the 2007 Juno Awards. The album is noteworthy for covers of both American rock band Stephen Kellogg and the Sixers’s 2004 hit "Maria" and Scottish rock band Del Amitri's 1995 hit "Driving With The Brakes On".

== Track listing ==
1. "Maria" (Mike Daly, Stephen Kellogg and the Sixers) - 3:44
2. "Trying To Get Back To You" (Brad Crisler, John Paul White) - 4:17
3. "My Life" (Catt Gravitt, Gerald O'Brien, Pamela Rose) - 4:23
4. "What Do You See" (Chris Thorsteinson, Bruce Wallace, Dave Wasyliw) - 3:21
5. "That Train" (Chris Thorsteinson, Dave Wasyliw, Stacy Wideltz) - 4:26
6. "I'm Just Gone" (Chris Thorsteinson, Rodney Clawson, Dave Wasyliw) - 3:25
7. "Driving With The Brakes On" (Justin Currie) - 4:00
8. "Keri" (Chris Thorsteinson, Bruce Wallace, Dave Wasyliw) - 3:33
9. "She's My Remedy" (Ashley Gorley, Chris Thorsteinson, Dave Wasyliw) - 3:52
10. "Comes A Time" (Neil Young) - 2:58
11. "This Is My Life" (And I'm Alright) (Chris Thorsteinson, Dave Wasyliw) - 2:55
12. "Your Mama Don't Know" (Randy Bachman, Chris Thorsteinson, Dave Wasyliw) - 3:19

== Personnel ==
- Drew Bollman – Engineer
- Eric Darken – Percussion
- Jim DeMain – Mastering
- Dan Dugmore – Pedal Steel
- John Hobbs – Keyboards
- Chip Matthews – Mixing
- Justin Niebank – Producer, Engineer
- Russ Pahl – Pedal Steel
- Murray Pulver – Banjo, Guitar, Vocals, Group Member
- Chris Sutherland – Percussion, Drums, Group Member
- Brian David Willis – Digital Editing
