= Moments (Emerson Drive song) =

Single by Emerson Drive

from the album Countrified
- B-side: "A Good Man"
- Released: November 27, 2006
- Genre: Country
- Length: 4:58 (album version); 3:52 (radio edit)
- Label: Midas Nashville
- Songwriters: Dave Berg; Annie Tate; Sam Tate
- Producers: Teddy Gentry; Josh Leo

Emerson Drive singles chronology
"Countrified Soul" (2006)	"Moments" (2006)	"You Still Own Me" (2007)

"Moments" is a song written by Sam Tate, Annie Tate and Dave Berg, and recorded by Canadian country music band Emerson Drive. It was released in November 2006 as the third single from the album Countrified. The song was a Top Five hit on the Canadian country music charts. It also reached Number One on the Billboard U.S. Hot Country Songs charts, becoming the first and only Number One single not only for the band, but also for their label, Midas Records Nashville. "Moments" was the most played country music song of 2007 in Canada. The song was nominated for Grammy Award for Best Country Performance by a Duo or Group with Vocal at the 50th Annual Grammy Awards.

== Content ==
The song is a ballad in which the narrator, a young man, plans to commit suicide by jumping off a bridge. While on the bridge, he notices an older, homeless man, to whom he gives money, figuring that he "wouldn't need it anyway". Upon receiving the money, the old homeless man tells of his past, saying that he "hasn't always been this way", and that he has had his "Moments, days in the sun / Moments [he] was second to none". Upon hearing the story, the young man then ponders his own life, wondering if anyone will miss him, should he decide to take his own life. He remembers his own "Moments, days in the sun." The young man then walks away from the bridge, imagining the older man telling his friends about his moments, including "that cool night on the East Street bridge / When a young man almost ended it / I was right there, wasn't scared a bit / And I helped to pull him through".

The song originated when songwriter Annie Tate and her husband, Sam, were working with their friend and songwriting partner Dave Berg to construct a song about people having their moments. Sam came up with the idea of basing the song around a homeless man. After the song was written, he stated, "I've always wanted to write a song about redemption and how everyone has the ability to redeem themselves somehow".

== Charts ==
Chart (2006–2007)	Peak position
Canada Hot 100 (Billboard)	62
Canada Country (Billboard)	4
US Hot Country Songs (Billboard)	1
US Billboard Hot 100	56
US Billboard Pop 100	86

=== Year-end charts ===
Chart (2007)	Position
US Country Songs (Billboard)	13
