= What If? (Emerson Drive album) =

Studio album by Emerson Drive
- Released: June 29, 2004
- Recorded: 2004
- Genre: Country
- Length: 56:30
- Label: DreamWorks
- Producer: Richard Marx

Emerson Drive chronology
Emerson Drive (2002)	What If? (2004)	Countrified (2006)

Singles from What If?
- 1. "Last One Standing" Released: January 19, 2004; 2. "November" Released: August 16, 2004; 3. "If You Were My Girl" Released: March 2005 (Canada only); 4. "Still Got Yesterday" Released: October 2005 (Canada only)

Professional ratings
Review scores
Source	Rating
Allmusic	3/5 stars

What If? is the fourth studio album by Canadian country music band Emerson Drive. It was released on June 29, 2004, via DreamWorks Nashville and was the group's final release with the label. Like their previous album, American musician Richard Marx produced the album. The group co-wrote one song on the album, "If You Were My Girl".

Four singles were released. "Last One Standing" was released in January 2004 as the lead single but did not perform well. A follow-up single, "November", only peaked at number 41 on the US Hot Country Songs chart. Two other singles, "If You Were My Girl" and "Still Got Yesterday", were exclusively released to Canadian country radio and peaked within the top ten of the Canada country charts.

A cover of the Nitty Gritty Dirt Band's number one country hit, "Fishin' in the Dark" was recorded. The songs "You're Like Comin' Home" and "I'll Die Tryin'" were later recorded by American country band Lonestar for their sixth studio album Coming Home (2005), of which both were released as singles.

== Track listing ==
No.	Title	Writer(s)	Length
1.	"Last One Standing"	Fee Waybill; Richard Marx	3:30
2.	"Lemonade"	Hillary Lindsey; Blair Daly; Troy Verges	4:22
3.	"If You Were My Girl"	David Cole; Marx; Brad Mates; Danick Dupelle; Pat Allingham; Mike Melancon; Patrick Bourque	3:23
4.	"What If?"	Steve Robson; Jeffrey Steele	3:49
5.	"I'll Die Tryin'"	Steve Bogard; Jeremy Stover	4:22
6.	"November"	Angelo Petraglia; Brett James	4:20
7.	"Fishin' in the Dark"	Wendy Waldman; Jim Photoglo	4:09
8.	"You're Like Coming Home"	Brandon Kinney; Brian Dean Maher; Stover	3:26
9.	"Take It from Me"	Tommy Lee James; Stephanie Lewis	3:58
10.	"Waitin' on Me"	Mates; Bobby Pinson	2:54
11.	"Running Back to You"	Marx	3:42
12.	"Simple Miracles"	Marx; Gary Harrison	4:19
13.	"Still Got Yesterday"	Greg Barnhill; Mates	3:50
14.	"Rescued"	B. James; Thom McHugh; Bryan Wayne	6:26
Total length:			56:30

== Personnel ==
- Patrick Bourque – bass guitar
- Danick Dupelle – lead guitar, background vocals
- Brad Mates – lead vocals, acoustic guitar
- Mike Melancon – drums, percussion
- David Pichette – fiddle
- Dale Wallace - keyboards

All instruments performed by Emerson Drive, except: Paul Franklin (steel guitar on "I'll Die Tryin'") and Cliff Colnot (strings).

== Charts ==
Chart (2004)	Peak position
US Billboard 200	107
US Heatseekers Albums (Billboard)	2
US Top Country Albums (Billboard)	12
