= Emerson Drive (album) =

- Reissue and digital cover

Studio album by Emerson Drive
- Released: May 21, 2002
- Genre: Country
- Length: 39:47
- Label: DreamWorks
- Producer: Julian King; Richard Marx; James Stroud

Emerson Drive chronology
Until You Walk the Tracks (as 12 Gauge) (1997)	Emerson Drive (2002)	What If? (2004)

Singles from Emerson Drive
- 1. "I Should Be Sleeping" Released: October 22, 2001; 2. "Fall into Me" Released: July 1, 2002; 3. "Only God (Could Stop Me Loving You)" Released: March 17, 2003

Alternative cover
- Original album cover

Emerson Drive is the third studio album by the Canadian country music band of the same name released on May 21, 2002 via DreamWorks Records Nashville. It produced three singles on the Billboard Hot Country Songs charts: the Top 5 hits "I Should Be Sleeping" and "Fall Into Me", as well as the number 23-peaking "Only God (Could Stop Me Loving You)". This latter song was originally recorded by Billy Ray Cyrus on his 1994 album Storm in the Heartland, and in 1999 by Lari White (as a duet with Toby Keith) on White's album Stepping Stone.

Professional ratings
Review scores
Source	Rating
Allmusic	link

== Track listing ==
All songs produced by Julian King and James Stroud except "Fall into Me" and "How Lucky I Am", produced by Richard Marx

No.	Title	Writer(s)	Length
1.	"Fall into Me"	Danny Orton; Jeremy Stover	2:48
2.	"Evidence"	Vicky McGehee; Trent Tomlinson; Bobby Pinson	3:13
3.	"Passionate, Desperate Love"	Brett Beavers; Tom Douglas	3:28
4.	"Only God (Could Stop Me Loving You)"	Robert John "Mutt" Lange	4:22
5.	"Say My Name"	Tomlinson; Pinson; Chris Hartman	2:55
6.	"I Should Be Sleeping"	Shaye Smith; Lisa Drew	2:57
7.	"Light of Day"	Tomlinson; Pinson; Kris Bergsnes	4:23
8.	"Looking Over My Shoulder"	John Bettis; Neil Thrasher; Michael Dulaney	3:14
9.	"I See Heaven"	Noah Gordon; Bergsnes; Jeff Loberg	2:42
10.	"How Lucky I Am"	Bob Regan; Chris Lindsey	3:51
11.	"Hollywood Kiss"	Marcus Hummon	2:58
12.	"It's All About You"	Reed Nielsen; Jeffrey Steele	2:56
Total length:			39:47

== Personnel ==
All instruments and vocals by Emerson Drive.

- Pat Allingham – fiddle, acoustic guitar, electric guitar, mandolin, background vocals
- Danick Dupelle – acoustic guitar, electric guitar, background vocals
- Chris Hartman – piano, synthesizer, organ, acoustic guitar, background vocals
- Jeff Loberg – bass guitar, background vocals
- Brad Mates – lead vocals, acoustic guitar
- Mike Melancon – drums, percussion, drum loops

All tracks produced by Julian King and James Stroud, except "Fall into Me" and "How Lucky I Am", produced by Richard Marx.

== Charts ==
=== Weekly charts ===
Chart (2002–03)	Peak position
US Billboard 200	108
US Top Country Albums (Billboard)	13
US Top Heatseekers Albums (Billboard)	2

=== Year-end charts ===
Chart (2003)	Position
US Top Country Albums (Billboard)	67
