= I Should Be Sleeping =

Single by Emerson Drive

from the album Emerson Drive
- B-side: "Hollywood Kiss"
- Released: October 22, 2001
- Genre: Country
- Length: 2:57
- Label: DreamWorks Records
- Songwriters: Shaye Smith; Lisa Drew
- Producers: Julian King; James Stroud

Emerson Drive singles chronology
"Some Trains Never Come" (1998)	"I Should Be Sleeping" (2001)	"Fall into Me" (2002)

"I Should Be Sleeping" is a song written by Shaye Smith and Lisa Drew, and recorded by Canadian country music group Emerson Drive. It was released in October 2001 as their first single from their debut self-titled album, Emerson Drive. The song reached the Top 5 on the U.S. Billboard Hot Country Songs chart, reaching a peak of number 4. It also peaked at number 35 on the U.S. Billboard Hot 100, making it their first crossover hit.

== Music video ==
The music video was directed by Thom Oliphant and premiered in late 2001.

== Chart positions ==
"I Should Be Sleeping" debuted at number 57 on the U.S. Billboard Hot Country Singles & Tracks for the chart week of November 10, 2001.

Chart (2001–2002)	Peak position
US Hot Country Songs (Billboard)	4
US Billboard Hot 100	35

=== Year-end charts ===
Chart (2002)	Position
US Country Songs (Billboard)	22
