= Fall into Me =

"Fall Into Me"

Single by Emerson Drive

from the album Emerson Drive
- B-side: "Only God (Could Stop Me Loving You)"
- Released: July 1, 2002
- Genre: Country
- Length: 2:48 (album version); 2:38 (radio edit)
- Label: DreamWorks
- Songwriters: Danny Orton; Jeremy Stover
- Producer: Richard Marx

Emerson Drive singles chronology
"I Should Be Sleeping" (2001)	"Fall Into Me" (2002)	"Only God (Could Stop Me Loving You)" (2003)

"Fall into Me" is a song by Canadian country music band Emerson Drive, released on July 1, 2002, as the second single from their eponymous third studio album following the top-five hit "I Should Be Sleeping". It was written by Danny Orton and Jeremy Stover with production by American musician Richard Marx. It would peak at number three on the US Hot Country Songs chart in early 2003. It was their highest charting single in the United States until "Moments" reached number one in 2007.

== Content ==
The male protagonist tells his partner that he is not like her previous partners and will care for her.

== Music video ==
Trey Fanjoy directed the music video for "Fall into Me". It was filmed at Newport Aquarium in Newport, Kentucky. It was released to CMT (Country Music Television) on July 14, 2002. It would be nominated at the 2003 CMT Flameworthy Awards for Breakthrough Video of the Year, losing to Joe Nichols' "Brokenheartsville".

=== Synopsis ===
It features the band performing the song in an aquarium, as a woman attempts to jump into a pool fully clothed and fall into her lover's arms underwater.

== Commercial performance ==
"Fall into Me" debuted at number 43 on the US Billboard Hot Country Songs chart the week of July 20, 2002; it reached number three on January 18, 2003, spending over 30 weeks on the chart. It was also a success on Radio & Records, peaking at number two behind Mark Wills' "19 Somethin'".

== Charts ==
=== Weekly charts ===
Chart (2002–2003)	Peak position
US Hot Country Songs (Billboard)	3
US Billboard Hot 100	34
US Country Top 50 (Radio & Records)	2

=== Year-end charts ===
Chart (2002)	Position
US Country Songs (Billboard)	66
US Country (Radio & Records)	68

Chart (2003)	Position
US Country Songs (Billboard)	36
US Country (Radio & Records)	27
