= Doc Walker =

Canadian country music band

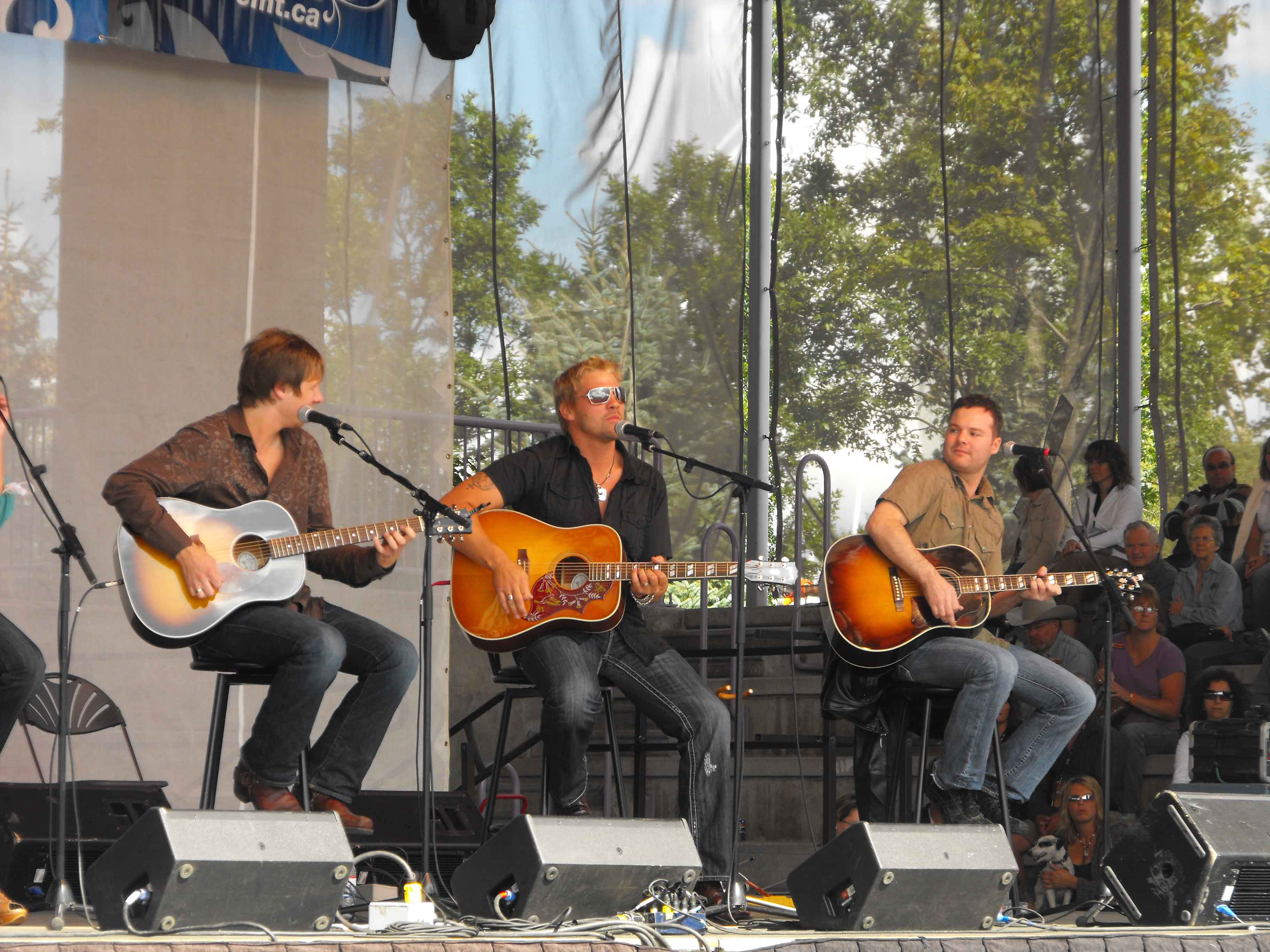
- Doc Walker, September 2008

Background information
- Origin: Westbourne, Manitoba, Canada
- Genre: Country
- Years active: 1996–present
- Labels: Agasea Records (1996-1997); Westlake Records (2001-2002); Open Road Recordings (2003-present)
- Members: Chris Thorsteinson; Dave Wasyliw; Brent Pearen (touring member); Steve Broadhurst (touring member)
- Past members: Mark Branconnier; Blake Manley; Paul Yee; Chris Sutherland; Murray Pulver
- Website: www.docwalker.ca

Doc Walker is a country music group from Westbourne, Manitoba, Canada. They have won Canadian Country Music Awards and had radio hits with the songs "I Am Ready" and "The Show is Free" from the 2003 album Everyone Aboard. In 2001, they released the album Curve. Both albums were for Universal Music Group.

Doc Walker is signed to Open Road Recordings and managed by RGK Entertainment Group.

"Coming Home" was released to radio in June 2009, as the lead single from the group's sixth studio album, Go, released in early September 2009.

"Country Girl" was released to radio in July 2011, as the lead single from the group's seventh studio album, 16 & 1, released August 29 physically and August 30, 2011, digitally.

== Discography ==
=== Studio albums ===
Title	Details
Good Day to Ride	Release date: August 11, 1997; Label: Agasea Records
Curve	Release date: November 20, 2001; Label: Westlake Records
Everyone Aboard	Release date: September 9, 2003; Label: Open Road Recordings
Doc Walker	Release date: November 7, 2006; Label: Open Road Recordings
Beautiful Life	Release date: April 29, 2008; Label: Open Road Recordings
Go	Release date: September 8, 2009; Label: Open Road Recordings
16 & 1	Release date: August 29, 2011; Label: Open Road Recordings
The 8th	Release date: October 21, 2014; Label: Open Road Recordings
Weathervane	Release date: March 31, 2017; Label: West Lake Music

=== Compilation albums ===
Title	Details
Echo Road – The Best of Doc Walker	Release date: September 30, 2016; Label: Open Road Recordings

=== Extended plays ===
Title	Details
Remember December	Release date: November 7, 2011; Label: Open Road Recordings

=== Singles ===
==== 1990s and 2000s ====
Year	Single	Peak positions		Album
Year	Single	CAN Country (Note: Peak positions from RPM Country Singles in 1996 and 1997, Radio & Records from 2004 to 2005, and Canada Country from 2006 to present.)	CAN	Album
1996	"That Bridge"	40	—	Good Day to Ride
1996	"Good Day to Ride"	—	—	Good Day to Ride
1997	"$100 Reward"	73	—	Good Day to Ride
2001	"She Hasn't Always Been This Way"	—	—	Curve
2001	"Whoever Made Those Rules"	—	—	Curve
2002	"Rocket Girl"	—	—	Curve
2002	"Call Me a Fool"	—	—	Curve
2003	"The Show Is Free"	—	—	Everyone Aboard
2003	"Get Up"	18	—	Everyone Aboard
2004	"North Dakota Boy"	7	—	Everyone Aboard
2004	"Forgive Me (For Giving a Damn)"	5	—	Everyone Aboard
2005	"I Am Ready"	9	—	Everyone Aboard
2006	"Maria"	9	—	Doc Walker
2006	"Trying to Get Back to You"	4	—	Doc Walker
2007	"Driving with the Brakes On"	5	81	Doc Walker
2007	"What Do You See"	5	77	Doc Walker
2007	"That Train"	10	96	Doc Walker
2008	"Beautiful Life"	5	61	Beautiful Life
2008	"That's All"	8	68	Beautiful Life
2008	"One Last Sundown"	10	82	Beautiful Life
2009	"Coming Home"	8	80	Go
2009	"If I Fall"	7	78	Go
"—" denotes releases that did not chart

==== 2010s and 2020s ====
Year	Single	Peak positions		Album
Year	Single	CAN Country	CAN	Album
2010	"I'm Gonna Make You Love Me"	5	87	Go
2010	"From Here"	6	100	Go
2011	"Country Girl"	16	—	16 & 1
2011	"Do It Right"	10	—	16 & 1
2012	"Where I Belong"	12	96	16 & 1
2013	"Put It Into Drive"	12	—	The 8th
2014	"Shake It Like It's Saturday Night"	36	—	The 8th
2014	"That's How I Like It"	12	—	The 8th
2015	"That's What I Call Love"	—	—	The 8th
2016	"Heaven on Dirt"	—	—	Echo Road – The Best of Doc Walker
2017	"Heart of the Heartland"	41	—	Weathervane
2021	"She Wants What She Wants"	—	—	Non-album single
"—" denotes releases that did not chart

==== As a featured artist ====
Year	Single	Peak positions		Album
Year	Single	CAN Country	CAN	Album
2012	"Let It Roll" (Emerson Drive with Doc Walker)	10	61	Roll
2014	"Run" (Blackjack Billy featuring Doc Walker and The Road Hammers)	35	—	Non-album single
"—" denotes releases that did not chart

=== Music videos ===
Year	Video	Director
1996	"That Bridge"	
1996	"Good Day to Ride"	
1997	"$100 Reward"	
2001	"She Hasn't Always Been This Way"	
2002	"Whoever Made Those Rules"	
2002	"Rocket Girl"	Ted Ellis
2003	"The Show Is Free"	Stephano Barberis
2003	"Get Up"	
2004	"North Dakota Boy"	Steven Goldmann
2005	"Forgive Me (For Giving a Damn)"	
2006	"Trying to Get Back to You"	
2007	"Driving with the Brakes On"	
2007	"That Train"	Antonio Hrynchuk
2008	"Beautiful Life"	Chris Hicky
2008	"That's All"	Tara Hungerford
2008	"One Last Sundown"	Chris Hicky
2009	"Coming Home"	Antonio Hrynchuk
2009	"If I Fall"	Stephano Barberis
2010	"I'm Gonna Make You Love Me"	Stephano Barberis
2010	"From Here"	
2011	"Country Girl"	Stephano Barberis
2012	"Let It Roll" (Emerson Drive with Doc Walker)	David Pichette
2013	"Put It Into Drive"	Steven Goldmann
2014	"Run" (Blackjack Billy featuring Doc Walker and The Road Hammers)	

== Awards and nominations ==
Year	Association	Category	Result
2002	Juno Awards of 2002	Best New Country Artist/Group	Nominated
2002	Canadian Country Music Association	Group or Duo of the Year	Nominated
2002	Canadian Country Music Association	Chevy Trucks Rising Star Award	Nominated
2002	Canadian Country Music Association	Album of the Year – Curve	Nominated
2002	Canadian Country Music Association	Independent Group or Duo of the Year	Won
2002	Canadian Country Music Association	Independent Song of the Year – "She Hasn't Always Been This Way"	Nominated
2002	Canadian Country Music Association	Independent Song of the Year – "Whoever Made Those Rules"	Nominated
2003	Juno Awards of 2003	Country Recording of the Year – Curve	Nominated
2003	Canadian Country Music Association	Group or Duo of the Year	Nominated
2003	Canadian Country Music Association	Single of the Year – "Rocket Girl"	Nominated
2003	Canadian Country Music Association	Independent Group or Duo of the Year	Won
2003	Canadian Country Music Association	Independent Song of the Year – "Call Me a Fool"	Nominated
2003	Canadian Country Music Association	Independent Song of the Year – "Rocket Girl"	Won
2004	Juno Awards of 2004	Country Recording of the Year – Everyone Aboard	Nominated
2004	Canadian Country Music Association	Kraft Cheez Whiz Fans' Choice Award	Nominated
2004	Canadian Country Music Association	Group or Duo of the Year	Won
2004	Canadian Country Music Association	Album of the Year – Everyone Aboard	Nominated
2004	Canadian Country Music Association	Single of the Year – "The Show Is Free"	Nominated
2005	Canadian Country Music Association	Group or Duo of the Year	Nominated
2006	Canadian Country Music Association	Group or Duo of the Year	Nominated
2007	Juno Awards of 2007	Country Recording of the Year – Doc Walker	Nominated
2007	Canadian Country Music Association	Kraft Cheez Whiz Fans' Choice Award	Nominated
2007	Canadian Country Music Association	Group or Duo of the Year	Nominated
2007	Canadian Country Music Association	Album of the Year – Doc Walker	Won
2007	Canadian Country Music Association	Single of the Year – "Driving with the Brakes On"	Nominated
2008	Canadian Country Music Association	Fans' Choice Award	Won
2008	Canadian Country Music Association	Group or Duo of the Year	Won
2008	Canadian Country Music Association	Album of the Year – Beautiful Life	Won
2008	Canadian Country Music Association	Single of the Year – "Beautiful Life"	Won
2008	Canadian Country Music Association	CMT Video of the Year – "Beautiful Life"	Won
2009	Juno Awards of 2009	Country Recording of the Year – Beautiful Life	Won
2009	Canadian Country Music Association	Fans' Choice Award	Nominated
2009	Canadian Country Music Association	Group or Duo of the Year	Won
2010	Juno Awards of 2010	Country Recording of the Year – Go	Nominated
2010	Canadian Country Music Association	Fans' Choice Award	Nominated
2010	Canadian Country Music Association	Group or Duo of the Year	Won
2010	Canadian Country Music Association	Album of the Year – Go	Nominated
2010	Canadian Country Music Association	Single of the Year – "If I Fall"	Nominated
2011	Canadian Country Music Association	Fans' Choice Award	Nominated
2011	Canadian Country Music Association	Group or Duo of the Year	Nominated
2011	Canadian Country Music Association	CMT Video of the Year – "I'm Gonna Make You Love Me"	Nominated
2012	Juno Awards of 2012	Country Recording of the Year – 16 & 1	Nominated
2012	Canadian Country Music Association	Group or Duo of the Year	Nominated
2012	Canadian Country Music Association	Album of the Year – 16 & 1	Nominated
