= Arlo Gilliam =

American musician (born 1977)

Arlo Gilliam (born June 24, 1977, in Altamont, Tennessee) is an American singer-songwriter and record producer.

Arlo Gilliam is a professional singer-songwriter and musician from Whitwell, Tennessee. Since moving to Nashville in 2001, he has released two solo independent albums and has amassed a wide and constantly growing catalogue. He has toured North America numerous times as well as internationally in the last ten years as a solo performer as well as with major recording artists. He has toured and performed with Wade Hayes, Trent Willmon, Katrina Elam, Luke Bryan and Emerson Drive.

Along with his solo career, he is currently the touring bass player for the Grammy Award-winning country music singer, Travis Tritt.
