= David Kalmusky =

- Birth name: David Kenneth Kalmusky
- Born: Stratford, Ontario, Canada
- Genres: Rock, pop, roots, blues
- Occupation(s): Record producer, mixer, songwriter, musician
- Instrument(s): Guitar, bass, synth, programming, keys
- Website: www.kalmusky.com

David Kalmusky (born in Stratford, Ontario, Canada) is an American record producer, mixer, songwriter, and guitarist. He has worked with Shawn Mendes, Keith Urban, Meghan Trainor, Justin Bieber, Carrie Underwood, Mötley Crüe, John Legend, Tenille Townes, Mickey Guyton, Icon For Hire, and others.

Kalmusky is currently partner at Addiction Sound Studios, in Nashville TN, which he helped design and build with Chris Huston (Led Zeppelin, The Who) and Jonathan Cain (The Babys, Bad English, Journey). His private production and mixing room have been featured in publications such as Pro Sound News, Billboard, GrammyPro.com and several high end audio manufacturers such as Fab Filter, AVID, Miktek, Output Sounds, and Metric Halo.
