= Emerson Drive =

Canadian country music band

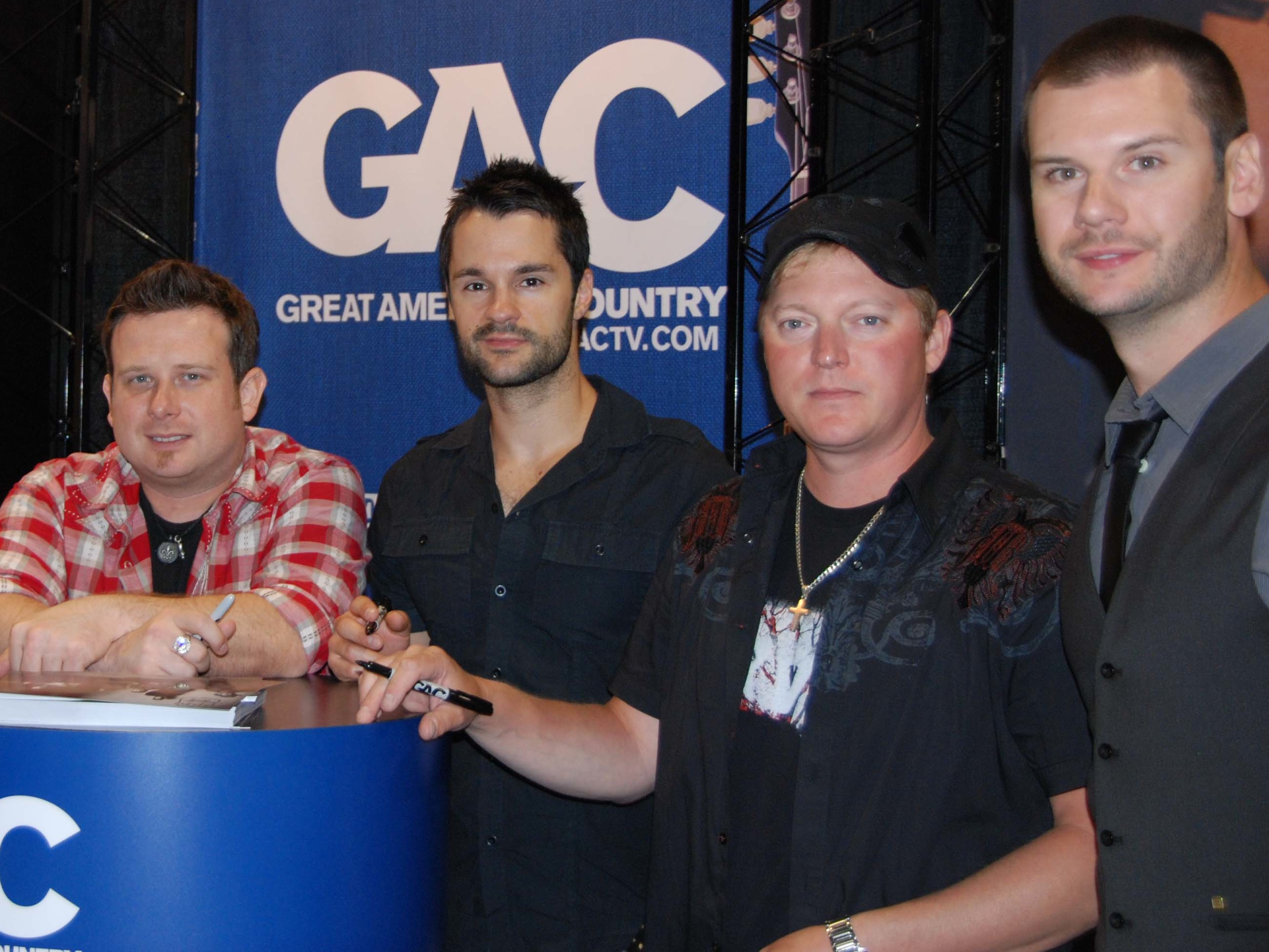
- Emerson Drive, 2010

Background information
- Also known as: 12 Gauge
- Origin: Grande Prairie, Alberta, Canada
- Genres: Country
- Years active: 1995–2024
- Labels: The Creative Collective; 12 Gauge; DreamWorks Nashville; Midas/Valory; Open Road; Amdian Music Co.; Nine North; QuarterBack; The Talent Associates; Big Star Recordings; Emerson Drive Touring LLC
- Past members: Brad Mates; Danick Dupelle; Mike Melancon; Dale Wallace; Pat Allingham; Chris Hartman; Jeff Loberg; Dan Binns; David Switzer; Remi Barre; Derrick Kuzemchuk; Dan Bauman; Patrick Bourque; David Pichette; Tyler Edison; Steven Swager
- Website: www.emersondrive.com

Emerson Drive was a Canadian country music band consisting of Brad Mates (lead vocals), Danick Dupelle (guitars, backing vocals), Mike Melancon (drums), and Dale Wallace (keyboards, backing vocals).

The band was founded in 1995 as 12 Gauge, which consisted of Mates, Pat Allingham (fiddle), Steven Swager (bass guitar), Chris Hartman (keyboards), Dan Binns (guitar), David Switzer (guitar), and Remi Barre (drums); Swager was replaced with Jeff Loberg early on. After recording under this name, the band moved to the United States in 1999 and renamed themselves to Emerson Drive.

They released two albums for the former DreamWorks Records Nashville branch: Emerson Drive in 2002 and What If? in 2004. These accounted for their first hit singles in the United States: "I Should Be Sleeping", "Fall into Me", and "Last One Standing". After DreamWorks closed, Emerson Drive signed with Midas Records Nashville for the 2006 album Countrified, which produced their only American number-one single in "Moments". Further releases in the United States were unsuccessful; however, the band continued to chart in Canada through releases on Open Road Recordings and Big Star Recordings over the next ten years.

== History ==
=== 12 Gauge, Until You Walk the Tracks – 1995–1998 ===
Emerson Drive was formed under the name of 12 Gauge in February 1995 when Brad Mates entered a talent contest at his local high school in Grande Prairie, Alberta. Through the contest, Mates met fiddler Pat Allingham, bass player Steven Swager and keyboardist Chris Hartman. Mates, Hartman, Swager and Allingham decided to form a band with guitarists Dan Binns and David Switzer, bass guitarist Jeff Loberg, and drummer Remi Barre. The band started practicing in Mates' basement and entering contests. In 1996, the group entered a local Battle of the Bands contest and won the opportunity to write and record their EP Open Season.

In 1996, 12 Gauge began work on their first studio album and independently released, Until You Walk the Tracks in 1997. Through 1997 and 1998, the group toured Canada to support their album and charted two songs, including the top 40 single, "Some Trains Never Come", which peaked at No. 36 on the RPM Country Tracks chart in 1998. Both singles were accompanied by music videos that received airplay on CMT Canada. In early 1998, the group received a nomination for Top New Group or Duo at the RPM Big Country Awards, but lost to Montana Sky.

By this time, Switzer had left the group and drummer Remi Barre had been replaced by Derrick Kuzemchuk. Soon after the release, Binns left the group. He was replaced by Dan Bauman, who stayed with the band for just over a year. By the end of 1998, Binns and Kuzemchuk left the group. Shortly after, the band hired Gerry Leiske, who most famously helped to form the Heritage Singers, as their manager, replacing previous manager Lionel Allingham (Pat's father). Leiske introduced the band to guitarist Danick Dupelle, who had been performing with Canadian country trio Farmer's Daughter, which Leiske also managed. Drummer Mike Melancon replaced Kuzemchuk.

=== Name Change, Nashville & Emerson Drive – 1999–2002 ===
In 1999, the band moved to Nashville, Tennessee, in search of a record deal. In the process, they discovered that '12 Gauge' was also the name of a rapper and had to choose a new name; Emerson Drive is named for the Emerson Trail that crosses Western Alberta and joins the Alaska Highway.

The group caught the attention of executives at DreamWorks Records subsidiary DreamWorks Nashville, who signed the group to a record deal in 2000. Emerson Drive's debut album, Emerson Drive, was scheduled to be released in January 2002, but was delayed when DreamWorks executives found two new songs and brought in singer-songwriter Richard Marx to produce. The album was released in May 2002; it ranked No. 67 on the Billboard Top Country Album charts for 2003.

Emerson Drive's debut American single, "I Should Be Sleeping", was released in November 2001. The song became a hit for the group on the Billboard Hot Country Single & Tracks chart in 2002, peaking at No. 4 and finishing the year at No. 22. The album's second single, "Fall into Me", one of the two new songs Marx produced, was issued in late 2002. It peaked at No. 3 on the Billboard Hot Country Songs chart in 2003, settling at No. 36 at year end. In Canada, it charted at No. 35 in 2002 and No. 32 in 2003, while "I Should Be Sleeping" charted at No. 40.

Reviews of Emerson Drive were favourable, and the band toured in support of it, playing several solo concerts and festivals, and opening for Keith Urban, Brad Paisley and Brooks and Dunn.

In 2002, the Academy of Country Music named Emerson Drive Top New Vocal Duo or Group, and the band won Top New Artist at the Radio & Records Year-End Awards. At the Canadian Country Music Association awards, the band won Group or Duo of the Year and the Chevy Trucks Rising Star Award.

Beginning in August 2002, the band went through member changes with the departure of bassist Jeff Loberg, who exited the group to focus on his songwriting. Loberg was replaced by Patrick Bourque. In 2003, keyboardist Chris Hartman left to return to school, and was replaced by Dale Wallace; Pat Allingham left to spend more time with his family and was replaced by David Pichette.

=== What If? – 2004–2005 ===
Emerson Drive released its second album, What If? on July 10, 2004. The album, which was also produced by Richard Marx, debuted at No. 12 on the Billboard Top Country Albums chart. The album's first single, "Waitin' on Me", was released to Canada only in late 2003; the next single, "Last One Standing", was released in Canada and the US in January 2004. Reviews of What If? were mixed but the band was signed as the opener for Shania Twain's Up! Tour. The tour began on September 25, 2003, and ended in July 2004. During this time, the band performed twice at the Grand Ole Opry.

In 2004, DreamWorks Nashville was sold to Universal Music Group, which released two more singles from What If? in Canada, through Universal Music Canada in 2005. Universal shut down DreamWorks Nashville and Emerson Drive was dropped.

=== Countrified – 2005–2006 ===
In late 2005, Keith Follesé and Brad Allen signed the band to their new label, Midas Records Nashville and the band began working on Emerson Drive's third album; Alabama's Teddy Gentry and veteran Nashville musician and songwriter Josh Leo were brought in to produce.

Countrified was released in September 2006, debuting at No. 30 on the Billboard Top Country Songs chart. The album's first single, "A Good Man," reached No. 17 on the Billboard Hot Country Songs chart (No. 5 in Canada) and was followed by "Moments", which gave the group their first (and only) No. 1 single (No 4 in Canada). Emerson Drive became the first Canadian group to reach number one and the fifth Canadian act overall.

"Moments" was followed in Canada by the top-five hit "Testify" and in the United States by the top-25 hit "You Still Own Me", a cover the 2004 Johnny Reid single.

Countrified won rave reviews. At the Juno Awards of 2007, Countrified was nominated for Country Recording of the Year and at the 42nd Academy of Country Music Awards, the band was nominated Top Vocal Group of the Year. The video for "Moments" won CMT Video of the Year, and at the Canadian Country Music Awards, the song won Single of the Year, and the band won Group or Duo of the Year. "Moments" was nominated as Best Country Performance by a Duo or Group with Vocals at the 49th Annual Grammy Awards.

=== Believe – 2007–2010 ===
Bassist Patrick Bourque resigned from the band in August 2007 and, the following month, took his own life, at age 30. The members of Emerson Drive learned of his death while traveling to a concert in Valentine, Nebraska. In November, the band talked with CBC News saying they had known that Bourque had been unhappy, but "nobody could do anything for him".

Emerson Drive toured the US in support of Believe through 2007, playing solo concerts and several festivals, including the 2007 CMA Music Festival. In October of that year, they accompanied Porter Wagoner, Trent Tomlinson, The Whites, Ricky Skaggs and Carrie Underwood in concert at the Grand Ole Opry. Producer and Alabama bassist Teddy Gentry was quoted as calling Emerson Drive “possibly the best band I’ve heard in years, as far as playing live on stage.”.

The band began recording their sixth album in 2008, with session bassists Michael Rhodes and Glenn Worf, and Arlo Gilliam as touring bassist. In November 2008, they released their first new single, "Belongs to You", on Midas and new label Valory Music Group, which began to promote the band in mid-2008. The song peaked at No. 32 on the Billboard Hot Country Songs chart in March 2009, and the new album, Believe was released in May 2009, in Canada only.

In November 2008, Valory (now Big Machine Records) entered into partnership with Midas and the band signed with Open Road Recordings. As the band was embroiled in a dispute with Midas, this left them without a USA-based label and Believe was not released in the United States at the time. Despite this, the group achieved three more top ten hits in Canada with "Believe," "I Love This Road," and "The Extra Mile".

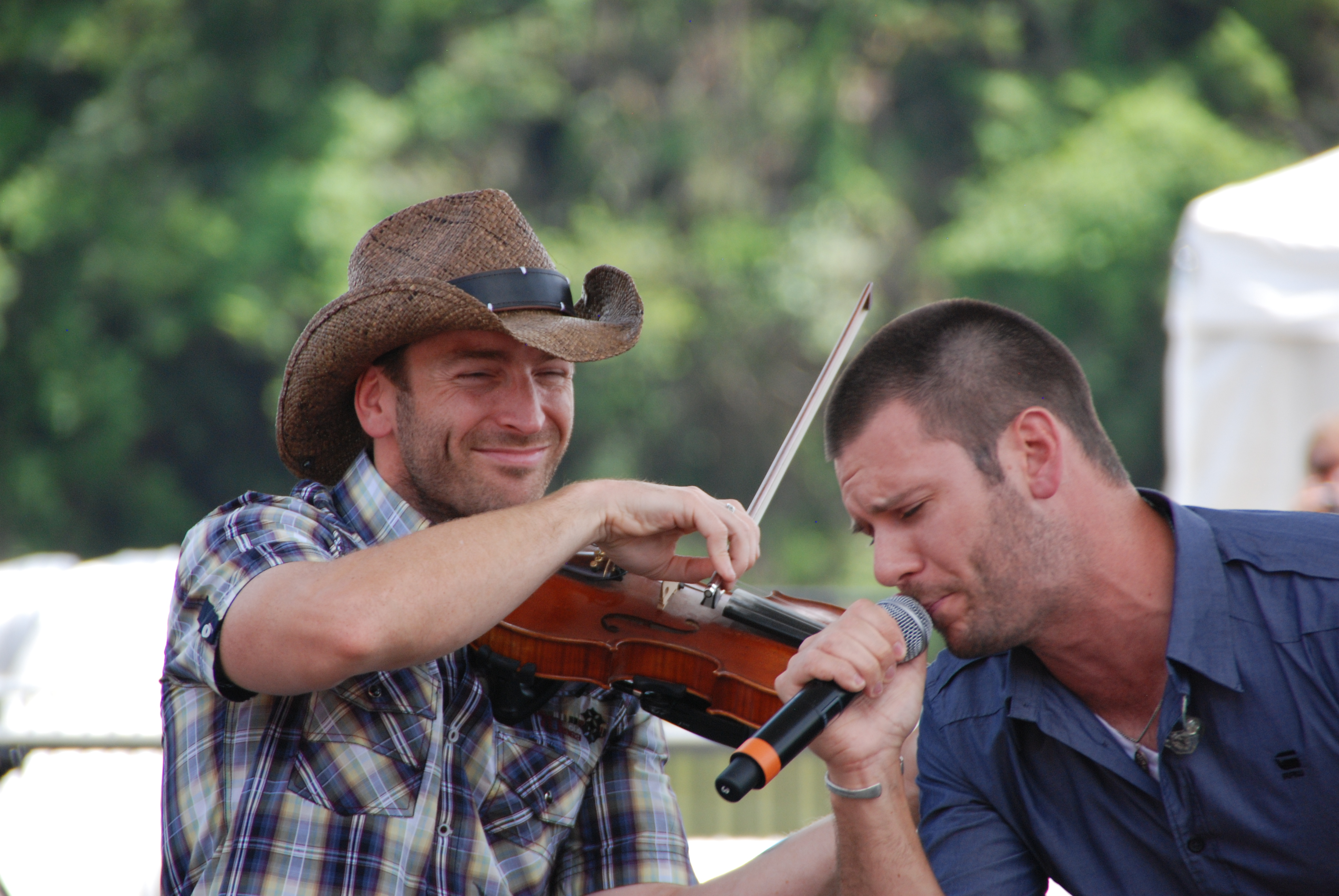
Emerson Drive at the CMA Music Festival

In 2010, the band founded its own label, Amdian Records. The first single, "That Kind of Beautiful", was released in Canada in June 2010 and in the United States in August.

Believe was very well received. In 2009, Emerson Drive was nominated as by the Canadian Country Music Association Awards as Group of the Year. At the Juno Awards of 2010, Believe was nominated as Country Album of the Year.

=== Decade of Drive – 2011 ===
Open Road Recordings released the band's greatest hits album, Decade of Drive, on February 8, 2011, in Canada. The album featured the band's biggest hits and new previously unreleased songs. Its first single, "When I See You Again", which was written as a tribute to Patrick Bourque, was released in November 2010 and peaked at No. 97. The second single, "Let Your Love Speak", peaked at No. 89. The third single, "Sleep It Off", did not chart.

In January 2011, Emerson Drive signed with Quarterback Records to release "Let Your Love Speak" to U.S. radio. The band began its Canadian Decade and Driving Tour on February 8, 2011.

=== Roll and Tilt-a-Whirl – 2012–2015 ===
Emerson Drive's seventh studio album, Roll, was released on October 30, 2012. The album's first single, "She's My Kind of Crazy", was released to Canadian country radio on July 9, 2012. The second single, "Let It Roll" (with Doc Walker) was released to Canadian country radio on October 23, 2012. The third single, "With You" was released to Canadian country radio in March 2013. The fourth, "She Always Get What She Wants" was released to Canadian country radio in June 2013. The band then criss-crossed Canada as part of the CMT Hitlist Tour 2013.

In May 2013, fiddle-player David Pichette left the band to focus on his family. He was not replaced.

Emerson Drive's first EP album, Tilt-a-Whirl, was released on April 14, 2015, on Universal Music Canada. Three singles, "Who We Are", "Till the Summer's Gone," and "Good Hurt," were released to Canadian country radio in 2015.

=== Farewell — 2017–2024 ===
Emerson Drive released the single, "Just Got Paid" to Canadian country radio on 2017. The song peaked at number 10 on the Billboard Canada Country chart. In 2019, the band released the single "Country People". In August 2021, the band posted on its Facebook page that it was recording new music.

In 2023, Emerson Drive independently released the single "Break Us", while announcing they would embark on their final tour in 2024.

== Personnel ==
Lineups

| 1995–1998 | 1998 | 1998 | 1998–2002 |
|---|---|---|---|
| Pat Allingham – fiddle; Remi Barre – drums; Dan Binns – guitars; Chris Hartman – keyboards; Jeff Loberg – bass; Brad Mates – lead vocals; David Switzer – guitars | Pat Allingham – fiddle; Dan Binns – guitars; Chris Hartman – keyboards; Jeff Loberg – bass; Brad Mates – lead vocals; Derrick Kuzemchuk – drums | Pat Allingham – fiddle; Chris Hartman – keyboards; Jeff Loberg – bass; Brad Mates – lead vocals; Derrick Kuzemchuk – drums; Dan Bauman – guitars | Pat Allingham – fiddle; Chris Hartman – keyboards; Jeff Loberg – bass; Brad Mates – lead vocals; Danick Dupelle – guitars, backing vocals; Mike Melancon – drums |
| 2002–2003 | 2003 | 2003–2007 | 2007–2013 |
| Pat Allingham – fiddle; Chris Hartman – keyboards; Brad Mates – lead vocals; Danick Dupelle – guitars, backing vocals; Mike Melancon – drums; Patrick Bourque – bass | Pat Allingham – fiddle; Brad Mates – lead vocals; Danick Dupelle – guitars, backing vocals; Mike Melancon – drums; Patrick Bourque – bass; Dale Wallace – keyboards, backing vocals | Brad Mates – lead vocals; Danick Dupelle – guitars, backing vocals; Mike Melancon – drums; Patrick Bourque – bass (his death); Dale Wallace – keyboards, backing vocals; David Pichette – fiddle | Brad Mates – lead vocals; Danick Dupelle – guitars, backing vocals; Mike Melancon – drums; Dale Wallace – keyboards, backing vocals; David Pichette – fiddle |
2013–2024
Brad Mates – lead vocals; Danick Duppelle – guitars, backing vocals; Mike Melancon – drums; Dale Wallace – keyboards, backing vocals

== Discography ==
=== Studio albums ===
- Open Season (1996)
- Until You Walk the Tracks (1997)
- Emerson Drive (2002)
- What If? (2004)
- Countrified (2006)
- Believe (2009)
- Roll (2012)
- Tilt-a-Whirl (2015)

=== Compilations ===
- Decade of Drive (2011)

=== Extended plays ===
- Tilt-a-Whirl (2015)

== Awards and nominations ==
| Year | Organization | Category | Result |
|---|---|---|---|
| 1998 | RPM Big Country Awards | Top New Group or Duo (as 12 Gauge) | Nominated |
| 2002 | Canadian Country Music Association | Group or Duo of the Year | Won |
| 2002 | Canadian Country Music Association | Chevy Trucks Rising Star Award | Won |
| 2002 | Canadian Country Music Association | Album of the Year – Emerson Drive | Nominated |
| 2002 | Canadian Country Music Association | Single of the Year – "I Should Be Sleeping" | Nominated |
| 2002 | Canadian Country Music Association | CMT Music Video of the Year – "I Should Be Sleeping" | Nominated |
| 2002 | Radio & Records Year-End Awards | Top New Artist MVP | Won |
| 2003 | Academy of Country Music | Top New Vocal Group or Duo | Won |
| 2003 | Canadian Country Music Association | Group or Duo of the Year | Won |
| 2003 | CMT Flameworthy Awards | Breakthrough Video of the Year – "Fall into Me" | Nominated |
| 2003 | Juno Awards | Country Recording of the Year – Emerson Drive | Nominated |
| 2004 | Canadian Country Music Association | Group or Duo of the Year | Nominated |
| 2004 | Canadian Country Music Association | CMT Music Video of the Year – "Last One Standing" | Nominated |
| 2005 | Canadian Country Music Association | Group or Duo of the Year | Nominated |
| 2006 | Canadian Country Music Association | Group or Duo of the Year | Nominated |
| 2006 | Canadian Country Music Association | CMT Music Video of the Year – "A Good Man" | Nominated |
| 2007 | Academy of Country Music | Top Vocal Group | Nominated |
| 2007 | Canadian Country Music Association | Group or Duo of the Year | Won |
| 2007 | Canadian Country Music Association | CMT Music Video of the Year – "Moments" | Won |
| 2007 | Canadian Country Music Association | Album of the Year – Countrified | Nominated |
| 2007 | Canadian Country Music Association | Single of the Year – "Moments" | Won |
| 2007 | Country Music Association | Vocal Group of the Year | Nominated |
| 2007 | Country Music Association | Music Video of the Year – "Moments" | Nominated |
| 2007 | Inspirational Country Music Awards | Video of the Year – "Moments" | Won |
| 2007 | Juno Awards | Country Recording of the Year – Countrified | Nominated |
| 2008 | Academy of Country Music | Top Vocal Group | Nominated |
| 2008 | Canadian Country Music Association | Fans' Choice Award | Nominated |
| 2008 | Canadian Country Music Association | Group or Duo of the Year | Nominated |
| 2008 | CMT Online Awards | No.1 Digitally Active Group of the Year | Nominated |
| 2008 | Country Music Association | Vocal Group of the Year | Nominated |
| 2008 | Dove Awards | Special Event Album of the Year – Songs 4 Worship: Country | Nominated |
| 2008 | Grammy Awards | Best Country Performance by a Duo or Group with Vocals – "Moments" | Nominated |
| 2009 | Canadian Country Music Association | Group or Duo of the Year | Nominated |
| 2010 | Juno Awards | Country Album of the Year – Believe | Nominated |
| 2011 | Canadian Country Music Association | Group or Duo of the Year | Nominated |
| 2012 | Canadian Country Music Association | Group or Duo of the Year | Nominated |
| 2013 | Juno Awards | Country Album of the Year – Roll | Nominated |
| 2013 | Canadian Country Music Association | Group or Duo of the Year | Nominated |
| 2013 | Canadian Country Music Association | Album of the Year – Roll | Nominated |
