= Josh Leo =

Songwriter

- Born: 1953 (age 72–73); Des Moines, Iowa, U.S.
- Genres: Country; pop
- Occupations: Guitarist; songwriter; record producer
- Instrument: Guitar
- Years active: 1976–present

Josh Leo (born 1953) is an American guitarist, songwriter, and record producer active in Nashville, Tennessee.

Leo was born in Des Moines, Iowa, but was raised in Kansas City, Missouri. In 1976, he moved to Chicago, Illinois and subsequently became a guitarist of the short-lived Eddie Boy Band. The band then traveled to Los Angeles, California two years later, where they recorded an album for MCA Records (which was the first record Leo had made). The Eddie Boy Band, however, was unsatisfied with the sound quality of the album, and they disbanded shortly afterward.

In 1979, four years after the Eddie Boy Band broke up, Leo began touring with JD Souther as a guitarist. And over the next few years, he would record and tour with the likes of Kim Carnes, Jimmy Buffett and Glenn Frey. During this time, Leo also began a songwriting career. In 1983, he scored his first hit when Crystal Gayle reached Number One on the Billboard Country Singles chart with his composition, "Baby, What About You." That same year, Leo recorded a pop album for Warner Bros. Records titled Rockin' on 6th, and he made his first venture into music production, when he produced Timothy B. Schmit's 1984 album, Playin' It Cool. In 1985, Leo moved to Nashville, Tennessee, to focus more on his writing and producing careers. The first album he produced while in Nashville was the Nitty Gritty Dirt Band's 1987 project, Hold On. One of the tracks from that album, "Baby's Got A Hold On Me" an up-tempo song he co-wrote with Jeff Hanna and Bob Carpenter, scored him his first hit as a producer on the R&R charts.

Throughout the late 1980s and 1990s, Leo wrote songs and produced albums for many country music artists and groups, such as Alabama, Restless Heart, Kathy Mattea, Reba McEntire and LeAnn Rimes, among others. Also during this time, he spent four years serving as vice president and head of A&R at RCA Records' Nashville division. Among the artists he signed during his tenure at RCA Nashville were Martina McBride and Lari White.

As of 2021, Leo continues to be active in the music business. Among his more recent projects are writing songs and producing albums for the likes of Brenda Lee, Lynyrd Skynyrd, Bad Company, Kenny Chesney and Dustin Lynch, as well a collaboration project with other fellow Nashville musicians, naming themselves the Vinyl Kings. His projects in the late 2000s include the production of two Emerson Drive albums, Countrified and Believe, both of which Leo co-produced with Alabama bass guitarist Teddy Gentry. Additionally, Leo has also produced the 2012 self-titled second album from the group Love and Theft and their 2015 album, Whiskey on my Breath.

All told, he has performed on over 150 records, produced 21 singles that reached No. 1 on the Billboard Top Country Albums chart, written six singles that reached No. 1 on the Billboard Country Singles chart, and won 6 BMI Millionaire awards.
