= Midas Records Nashville =

American record label

Midas Records
- Founded: 2005
- Founder: Ron Clapper
- Distributor: Koch Entertainment
- Genre: Country, Christian
- Country of origin: U.S.
- Location: Nashville, Tennessee

Midas Records was an American independent record label specializing in country music and contemporary Christian music. It was founded in August 2005 by Ron Clapper, Keith Follesé and Brad Allen. The label partnered with New Revolution not long after opening. In 2008, the label underwent a restructuring which resulted in Adam Gregory being promoted by Big Machine Records while maintaining affiliation with Midas.

== Former artists ==
- Angel
- Steve Azar
- Jessie Daniels
- Emerson Drive (Valory/Midas)
- Lindsey Grant
- Adam Gregory (Big Machine/No Strings Attached/Midas)
- Rush of Fools
- Whiskey Falls
- Jon Wolfe

== Weather Channel compilations ==
The Weather Channel released The Best of Smooth Jazz and Smooth Jazz II compilations under the Midas label.
