= Keith Follesé =

American songwriter

- Born: 1951 (age 73–74); Minneapolis, Minnesota
- Genres: Country
- Occupation: Songwriter
- Years active: 1993–present
- Spouse: Adrienne Follesé

Keith Follesé (born 1951) is an American songwriter and co-founder of Midas Records Nashville.

== Biography ==
Early in his career, Follesé recorded with his wife, Adrienne, on A&M Records. They never released an album, and moved to Los Angeles, California. There, Follesé tried to form a band while raising his family, but later moved to Nashville, Tennessee after being persuaded by a friend.

Songs that Follesé co-wrote include "Before You Kill Us All" by Randy Travis, "Life Goes On" by Little Texas and four songs that went to number one between 1999 and 2000: "Something Like That" by Tim McGraw, "I Love You" by Martina McBride, "Smile" by Lonestar, and "The Way You Love Me" by Faith Hill.

In November 2001, Follesé was named Songwriter of the Year by the American Society of Composers, Authors and Publishers (ASCAP). Follesé founded the Midas Records Nashville label in 2005 with Brad Allen.

Follesé's sons, Ryan and Jamie, are members of the pop music band Hot Chelle Rae. In addition to Hot Chelle Rae his son Ryan Follessé is a country solo artist, as well as one half of the country duo Ryan and Rory.
