= Into the Light =

Into the Light may refer to:

== Albums ==
- Into the Light (Chris de Burgh album), 1986
- Into the Light (Gloria Estefan album), 1991
- Into the Light (David Coverdale album), 2000
- Nuclear Blast All-Stars: Into the Light, a 2007 compilation from Nuclear Blast Records
- Into the Light (Linda Andrews album), 2009
- Into the Light (Phil Stacey album), 2009
- Into the Light (Fady Maalouf album), 2010
- Into the Light (Matthew West album), 2012
- Into the Light (Marisa Anderson album), 2016
- Into the Light (EP), a 2022 release by Lightsum
- Into the Light: The Solo Albums, a 2024 box set by Whitesnake

== Songs ==
- "Into the Light", a 1981 song by Siouxsie and the Banshees from the album Juju
- "Into the Light", a 1989 song by Joe Satriani from the album Flying in a Blue Dream
- "Into the Light" (song), a 2009 single by Fady Maalouf
- "Into the Light", a 2010 song by Rage from the album Strings to a Web
- "Into the Light", a 2011 song by Gareth Emery

== Other uses ==
- Into the Light (radio drama), a 1938 Australian broadcast series by Edmund Barclay
- Into the Light (musical), a 1986 short-lived Broadway production
- "Into the Light" (The Twilight Zone), a 2003 television episode
- "Into the Light" (Doctors), a 2005 television episode
- Into the Light, a 2010 drum corps production by Phantom Regiment
- Into the Light Indonesia, a suicide-prevention nonprofit, founded 2013
- Into the Light (novel), a 2021 science fiction work by David Weber and Chris Kennedy
