= Blessing (disambiguation) =

A blessing is a type of religious pronouncement.

Blessing or Blessings may also refer to:

== Religion ==
- Blessing (Roman Catholic Church), a rite by which persons or things are sanctified as dedicated to divine service
- Apostolic Blessing, a blessing imparted by the Pope

== Entertainment ==
=== Fiction, film, TV ===
- Blessings (film), a 2003 television drama film directed by Arvin Brown
- Blessings (TV series), a 2014 Singaporean television series
- Blessings (novel), a 2024 novel by Chukwuebuka Ibeh
- The Blessing (novel), a 2015 novel by Nancy Mitford

=== Music ===
- "Blessings" (Big Sean song), a 2015 song by Big Sean from the album Dark Sky Paradise
- Blessings (Futuristic album), a 2017 album by Futuristic
- "Blessings" (Lecrae song), a 2017 song by Christian rapper Lecrae featuring Ty Dolla $ign
- Blessings (Laura Story album), a 2011 album by Laura Story
  - Blessings (Laura Story song)
- Blessings (Sublime with Rome album), a 2019 album by Sublime with Rome
- "The Blessing" (Yoasobi song), a 2022 song by Yoasobi
- "Blessings", a 1987 song by Gavin Friday and Simon Carmody
- "Blessings", a 2016 song by Chance the Rapper from the mixtape Coloring Book
- "Blessings", a 2016 song by Rich the Kid from the mixtape Keep Flexin
- "Blessings" (Florida Georgia Line song), 2019
- "Blessings" (Calvin Harris song), 2025
- "Blessings", a 2026 song by Stormzy, Fridayy, and Angel from Official FIFA World Cup 2026 Album
- The Blessing (rock band), a former British rock band

== Places ==
- Blessing, Texas, United States
- Blessing, United States Virgin Islands

== Other ==
- Blessing (name)
- "Blessing" (poem), a poem by Imtiaz Dharker
- E. K. Blessing, a manufacturer of musical instruments
- Hotel Blessing, an historic hotel in Blessing, Texas, United States
- Blessing, a ship of the Third Supply fleet to Virginia colony in 1609
- Blessing of the Bay, built 1631, one of the first ships constructed in Colonial America

== See also ==
- Bless (disambiguation)
- Blessed (disambiguation)
- The Blessing (disambiguation)
