= Deutschland sucht den Superstar season 5 =

Deutschland sucht den Superstar
- Season 5
- Hosted by: Marco Schreyl
- Judges: Dieter Bohlen; Andreas "Bär" Läsker; Anja Lukaseder
- Winner: Thomas Godoj
- Runner-up: Fady Maalouf

Release
- Original network: RTL
- Original release: 8 March – 17 May 2008

Season chronology
- ← Previous; Season 4 Next → Season 6

The fifth season of Deutschland sucht den Superstar live shows began 8 March 2008. It is currently hosted by Marco Schreyl and jury panel, Dieter Bohlen, Anja Lukaseder, and Andreas "Bär" Läsker also star. This season, instead of making top 20 shows (where the boys and girls are split up in two groups of 10 and the viewing public voting for their favorite), the producers decided to make the top 15 live show "Now or Never" and chose the top 10 live to premier in the "Mottoshows" (theme shows) for the upcoming season.

== Finalists ==
(Ages stated at time of contest)

Contestant	Age	Hometown	Voted off	Liveshow theme
Thomas Godoj	29	Recklinghausen	Winner	Grand Finale
Fady Maalouf	28	Hamburg	17 May 2008	Grand Finale
Linda Teodosiu	16	Cologne	10 May 2008	Number 1 Hits/The Beatles/Dedicated to...
Monika Ivkic	18	Stuttgart	3 May 2008	Hits in Germany and England
Rania Zeriri	22	Gronau-Epe	26 April 2008	Party Music & Ballads
Benjamin Herd	16	Worms	19 April 2008	Judge's Choice
Collins Owusu	25	Düsseldorf	12 April 2008	Greatest Hits
Stella Salato	22	Bad Homburg	5 April 2008	Mariah Carey & Take That
Sahra Drone	18	Werl	22 March 2008	Film Hits
Jermaine Alford	20	Langenselbold	15 March 2008	Greatest Current Hits

== Episode summaries ==
=== Top 15 – "Jetzt oder nie" (Now or Never) (contestants not in order) ===
Original airdate: 8 March 2008

Contestant	Song (Artist)	Audience Vote/ Jury Vote
Benjamin Herd	Let Me Love You (Mario)	4,65% (7/15)
Collins Owusu	Amazing (Seal)	2,5% (9/15)
Felix Gaisberger	Hero (Enrique Iglesias)	1,1% (13/15) (elim)
Simon Gincberg	Right Here Waiting (Richard Marx)	0,96% (15/15) (elim)
Christopher Schnell	Mandy (Westlife)	3,73% (8/15) (elim)
Fady Maalouf	Home (Michael Bublé)	8,55% (2/15)
Jermaine Alford	I Swear (All-4-One)	2,06% (12/15)
Thomas Godoj	Chasing Cars (Snow Patrol)	47,5% (1/15)
Juna Manaj	Come On Over Baby (All I Want Is You) (Christina Aguilera)	2,08% (11/15) (elim)
Monika Ivkic	Hurt (Christina Aguilera)	7,25% (3/15)
Sahra Drone	Bleeding Love (Leona Lewis)	5,54% (5/15)
Viviana Stengel	Bubbly (Colbie Caillat)	1,06% (14/15) (elim)
Linda Teodosiu	Soulmate (Natasha Bedingfield)	6,03% (4/15)
Rania Zeriri	Get Here (Oleta Adams)	4,82% (6/15)
Stella Salato	Unbreak My Heart (Toni Braxton)	2,17% (10/15)

Advancing to Top 10 (Public votes): Monika, Linda, Fady, Sahra, Thomas

Advancing to Top 10 (Jury selection): Jermaine, Rania, Stella, Collins, Benjamin

=== Finals ===
==== Contestants ====
Rania Zeriri, born on 6 January 1986, in Enschede, is of Algerian-Dutch ethnicity. Zeriri was born with holes in her vocal cords. In spite of this vocal handicap, she reached a high position.

Benjamin Herd was born in Worms and is the youngest male contestant of this season. He was early disputed, due to both his extravagant behavior and his enduring back-talking disrespect especially to the jury, which eventually led to his voluntary leaving. Jury member Dieter Bohlen then talked Herd back into the competition, where he was finally voted off by the audience on 19 April 2008, just reaching the 6th show.

Thomas Godoj was the winner of the fifth season. He was born in southern Poland, but raised in Recklinghausen.

Fady Maalouf was runner-up of the season. He was born in Zahlé, Lebanon. His song in the finals entitled "Blessed" went straight to number 2 in the German charts upon release, followed by Blessed that also charted at number 2 in the German albums chart.

==== Top 10 – "Aktuelle Hits" (Greatest Current Hits) ====
Original airdate: 15 March, 2008ds

Contestant	Song (Artist)	Percentage of calls
Fady Maalouf	Helpless When She Smiles (Backstreet Boys)	7,08% (4/10)
Benjamin Herd	LoveStoned (Justin Timberlake)	5,88% (5/10)
Jermaine Alford	Apologize (OneRepublic)	2,37% (10/10)
Rania Zeriri	Rehab (Amy Winehouse)	4,67% (6/10)
Linda Teodosiu	Oh Mother (Christina Aguilera)	8,9% (3/10)
Stella Salato	Big Girls Don't Cry (Fergie)	2,78% (9/10)
Collins Owusu	I'll Be Waiting (Lenny Kravitz)	3,7% (7/10)
Sahra Drone	Listen (Beyoncé Knowles)	2,85% (8/10)
Thomas Godoj	Stark (Ich & Ich)	52,75% (1/10)
Monika Ivkic	Nobody Knows (Pink)	9,02% (2/10)

Bottom 5: Linda, Fady, Jermaine, Collins, Benjamin

Jury Elimination Forecast: Jermaine, Collins

Jury Best Performance Forecast: Monika or Sahra or Thomas (All)

Eliminated: Jermaine

==== Top 9 – "Die grössten Filmhits" (Greatest Film Hits) ====
Original airdate: 22 March 2008

Contestant	Song (Artist)	Percentage of calls
Collins Owusu	Everybody Needs Somebody (Blues Brothers)	3,15% (7/9)
Sahra Drone	Too Lost In You (Sugababes)	1,24% (9/9)
Benjamin Herd	Stand By Me (Ben E. King)	7,08% (6/9)
Stella Salato	Run to You (Whitney Houston)	3,01% (8/9)
Monika Ivkic	I'm Every Woman (Whitney Houston)	7,28% (5/9)
Rania Zeriri	Colors of the Wind (Vanessa L. Williams)	7,69% (4/9)
Thomas Godoj	Same Mistake (James Blunt)	39,88% (1/9)
Linda Teodosiu	GoldenEye (Tina Turner)	9,58% (3/9)
Fady Maalouf	She's Like The Wind (Patrick Swayze)	21,09% (2/9)

Bottom 5: Linda, Collins, Benjamin, Rania, Sahra

Jury Elimination Forecast: Benjamin, Collins (Dieter), Collins, Rania (Anja), Benjamin (Bär)

Jury Best Performance Forecast: Fady (Dieter, Anja), Monika, Fady (Bär)

Eliminated: Sahra

==== Top 8 – "Mariah Carey / Take That" ====
Original airdate: 5 April 2008

Contestant	Song (Artist)	Percentage of calls
Linda Teodosiu	Hero (Mariah Carey)	9,21% (2/8)
Benjamin Herd	Relight My Fire (Take That)	5,82% (7/8)
Rania Zeriri	Against All Odds (Mariah Carey)	7,27% (4/8)
Collins Owusu	Love Ain't Here Anymore (Take That)	5,91% (6/8)
Monika Ivkic	Without You (Mariah Carey)	6,12% (5/8)
Stella Salato	Dreamlover (Mariah Carey)	5,03% (8/8)
Fady Maalouf	Back for Good (Take That)	8,54% (3/8)
Thomas Godoj	Rule the World (Take That)	52,1% (1/8)

Bottom 4: Monika, Benjamin, Rania, Stella

Jury Elimination Forecast: Benjamin (All)

Jury Best Performance Forecast: Thomas (All)

Eliminated: Stella

Guest star Mariah Carey performed her new hit single "Touch My Body" and worked with the contestants backstage. This is the first time that the host spoke English and had an English interview live on the show. As well, casting contestant Mario Teusch sang "Supermario", a techno song of his experience at his audition with the jury.

==== Top 7 – "Greatest Hits" ====
Original airdate: 12 April 2008

Contestant	Song (Artist)	Percentage of calls
Monika Ivkic	What a Feeling (Irene Cara)	5,94% (6/7)
Collins Owusu	End of the Road (Boyz II Men)	4,45% (7/7)
Rania Zeriri	Smooth Operator (Sade)	10,4% (4/7)
Thomas Godoj	I Still Haven't Found What I'm Looking For (U2)	40,81% (1/7)
Benjamin Herd	Wake Me Up Before You Go-Go (Wham!)	6,54% (5/7)
Fady Maalouf	Your Song (Elton John)	13,91% (3/7)
Linda Teodosiu	One Day in Your Life (Anastacia)	17,95% (2/7)

Bottom 4: Collins, Rania, Benjamin, Thomas

Jury Elimination Forecast: Rania (Dieter), Benjamin or Rania (Anja and Bär)

Jury Best Performance Forecast: Fady or Linda

Eliminated: Collins

==== Top 6 – "Judges' Choice" ====
Original airdate: 19 April 2008

Contestant	Song (Artist)	Percentage of calls
Fady Maalouf	We Have a Dream (Deutschland sucht den Superstar (Season 1)) (chosen by Dieter Bohlen)	12,98% (3/6)
Rania Zeriri	Valerie (Amy Winehouse) (chosen by "Bär" Läsker)	6,63% (5/6)
Benjamin Herd	Señorita (Justin Timberlake) (chosen by Anja Lukaseder)	5,91% (6/6)
Linda Teodosiu	Because of You (Kelly Clarkson) (chosen by Anja Lukaseder)	15,15% (2/6)
Monika Ivkic	Für dich (Yvonne Catterfeld) (chosen by Dieter Bohlen)	8,95% (4/6)
Thomas Godoj	Shadow of the Day (Linkin Park) (chosen by "Bär" Läsker)	50,38% (1/6)

Bottom 3: Rania, Benjamin, Monika

Jury Elimination Forecast: Benjamin or Rania (All)

Jury Best Performance Forecast: Linda or Thomas (All)

Eliminated: Benjamin

==== Top 5: "Party Music and Ballads" ====
Original airdate: 26 April 2008

Contestant	Song (Artist)	Percentage/ calls
Linda Teodosiu	I Will Survive (Gloria Gaynor)	15,37% (3/5)
Linda Teodosiu	The Voice Within (Christina Aguilera)	15,37% (3/5)
Rania Zeriri	I'm So Excited (Pointer Sisters)	8,12% (5/5)
Rania Zeriri	Save the Best For Last (Vanessa L. Williams)	8,12% (5/5)
Monika Ivkic	Let's Get Loud (Jennifer Lopez)	9,78% (4/5)
Monika Ivkic	Killing Me Softly (Roberta Flack)	9,78% (4/5)
Thomas Godoj	You Get What You Give (New Radicals)	50,04% (1/5)
Thomas Godoj	Behind Blue Eyes (The Who/ Limp Bizkit)	50,04% (1/5)
Fady Maalouf	Never Gonna Give You Up (Rick Astley)	16,69% (2/5)
Fady Maalouf	All By Myself (Eric Carmen)	16,69% (2/5)

Bottom 3: Rania, Thomas, Monika

Jury Elimination Forecast: Rania or Monika (Dieter), Rania (Anja and Bär)

Jury Best Performance Forecast: Didn't say (All)

Eliminated: Rania

==== Top 4: "Germany vs. England" ====
Original airdate: 3 May 2008

Contestant	Song (Artist)	Percentage/ calls
Monika Ivkic	You Might Need Somebody (Shola Ama)	9,05% (4/4)
Monika Ivkic	Liebe ist alles (Rosenstolz)	9,05% (4/4)
Fady Maalouf	Und wenn ein Lied (Söhne Mannheims)	19,22% (3/4)
Fady Maalouf	Breathe Easy (Blue)	19,22% (3/4)
Thomas Godoj	Wonderwall (Oasis)	46,83% (1/4)
Thomas Godoj	Mensch (Herbert Grönemeyer)	46,83% (1/4)
Linda Teodosiu	Durch die Nacht (Silbermond)	24,9% (2/4)
Linda Teodosiu	Mercy (Duffy)	24,9% (2/4)

Bottom: all candidates were in the Bottom Group

Jury Elimination Forecast: Monika (All)

Jury Best Performance Forecast: Didn't say (All)

Eliminated: Monika

==== Top 3: "Number 1 Hits" / "The Beatles"/ "Dedicated to..." ====
Original airdate: 10 May 2008

Contestant	Song (Artist)	Percentage/ calls
Thomas Godoj	In the Shadows (The Rasmus)	46,34% (1/3)
Thomas Godoj	Let it Be (The Beatles)	46,34% (1/3)
Thomas Godoj	Easy (Faith No More)	46,34% (1/3)
Linda Teodosiu	Don't Stop the Music (Rihanna)	23,34% (3/3)
Linda Teodosiu	With a Little Help From My Friends (The Beatles)	23,34% (3/3)
Linda Teodosiu	My All (Mariah Carey)	23,34% (3/3)
Fady Maalouf	You Raise Me Up (Westlife)	30,32% (2/3)
Fady Maalouf	Yesterday (The Beatles)	30,32% (2/3)
Fady Maalouf	Feeling Good (Michael Bublé)	30,32% (2/3)

Jury Elimination Forecast: Linda (Anja, Dieter), Fady (Bär)

Jury Best Performance Forecast: Thomas or Fady (Anja, Dieter), Thomas or Linda (Bär)

Eliminated: Linda

==== Top 2: Finale (Singer's choice, Highlight song & Winner's Single) ====
Original airdate: 17 May 2008

Contestant	Song (Artist)	Percentage/ calls
Fady Maalouf	Careless Whisper (Wham!)	37,8% (2/2)
Fady Maalouf	She's Like The Wind (Patrick Swayze)	37,8% (2/2)
Fady Maalouf	Blessed (Fady Maalouf)	37,8% (2/2)
Thomas Godoj	Fairytale Gone Bad (Sunrise Avenue)	62,2% (1/2)
Thomas Godoj	Chasing Cars (Snow Patrol)	62,2% (1/2)
Thomas Godoj	Love Is You (Thomas Godoj)	62,2% (1/2)

=== Elimination chart ===
Legend
Female	Male	Top 15	Top 10	Winner

Safe	Most votes	Safe First	Safe Last	Eliminated

Stage:		Top 15	Finals								
Week:		3/1	3/8	3/15	3/22	4/5	4/12	4/26	5/3	5/10	5/17
Place	Contestant	Result									
1	Thomas Godoj	Viewers	1st 52,75%	1st 39,88%	1st 52,01%	1st 40,81%	1st 50,38%	1st 50,04%	1st 46,83%	1st 46,34%	Winner; 62,2%
2	Fady Maalouf	Viewers	4th 7,08%	2nd 21,09%	3rd 8,54%	3rd 13,91%	3rd 12,98%	2nd 16,69%	3rd 19,22%	2nd 30,32%	Runner-Up; 37,8%
3	Linda Teodosiu	Viewers	3rd 8,09%	3rd 9,58%	2nd 9,21%	2nd 17,95%	2nd 15,15%	3rd 15,37%	2nd 24,09%	3rd 23,34%	
4	Monika Ivkic	Viewers	2nd 9,02%	5th 7,28%	5th 6,12%	6th 5,94%	4th 8,95%	4th 9,78%	4th 9,05%		
5	Rania Zeriri	Judges	6th 4,67%	4th 7,69%	4th 7,27%	4th 10,04%	5th 6,63%	5th 8,12%			
6	Benjamin Herd	Judges	5th 5,88%	6th 7,08%	7th 5,82%	5th 6,54%	6th 5,91%				
7	Collins Owusu	Judges	7th 3,07%	7th 3,15%	6th 5,91%	7th 4,45%					
8	Stella Salato	Judges	9th 2,78%	8th 3,01%	8th 5,03%						
9	Sahra Drone	Viewers	8th 2,85%	9th 1,24%							
10	Jermaine Alford	Judges	10th 2,37%								
11–15	Christopher Schnell	Elim									
11–15	Felix Gaisberger	Elim									
11–15	Juna Manaj	Elim									
11–15	Simon Gincberg	Elim									
11–15	Viviana Stengel	Elim									
