= Monika Ivkic =

Austrian singer

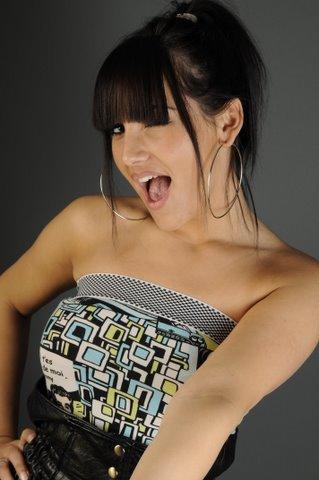
- Monice in 2008

Background information
- Also known as: Monice
- Born: 6 June 1989 (age 37); Gradačac, SR Bosnia and Herzegovina, Yugoslavia
- Origin: Vienna, Austria
- Genres: Pop, turbofolk
- Occupation: Singer
- Years active: 2005–present

Monika Ivkic (born 6 June 1989), also known as Monice, is a Austrian pop singer of Serbian origin best known for achieving fourth place in the fifth season of the German casting show Deutschland sucht den Superstar (DSDS). She released her first album I'm Gonna Make It in 2009. After the end of Deutschland sucht den Superstar, she had a specially published book released that was sold in Germany and Austria.

== Early life ==
Ivkic was born in Gradačac, Bosnia and Herzegovina former Yugoslavia and spent her early childhood in Bosnia and Herzegovina before moving to Vienna, Austria as a young child with her parents. She has German and Bosnian-Serb ancestry. At the age of 17, she dropped out of school and decided to pursue a career as a singer.

== Career ==
=== 2005–2007: Career beginnings ===
At age 15, Ivkic participated in the German version of Popstars, a casting show broadcast by the German TV station ProSieben. After getting disqualified because she did not meet the minimum age requirement, she was invited to resubmit her application for the following season, where she progressed through the auditions but failed to make it to the finals.

A year later, she took part in the fifth season of Starmania, a casting show broadcast by the Austrian TV station ORF. Her popularity soared when, in the following year, she qualified for the fifth season of Deutschland sucht den Superstar (DSDS), which is broadcast by RTL, and finished in fourth place.

=== 2008: Deutschland sucht den Superstar ===
Ivkic participated in the fifth season of Deutschland sucht den Superstar (DSDS), the German version of the US talent show American Idol. She made it to the quarter-finals but was voted out of the show through telephone voting and finished in fourth place.

At the show's finale, which pitted Fady Maalouf against eventual winner Thomas Godoj, Ivkic returned to perform live, both alone and with other contestants. She is also included with the others on the album produced by Dieter Bohlen, Fly Alone. She sings on the title track "Fly Alone" as well as on "All for One" with all the other ten candidates. She also appears singing duets with other finalists on three songs. The album entered the top-10 of the German album charts.

DSDS performances of Monika Ivkic, by Mottoshow (weekly theme show)
Show: theme	Song	Original singer	Placement
Top-15 show: "Jetzt oder nie" ("Now or never")	"Hurt"	Christina Aguilera	3/15 with 7.25%
1st Mottoshow: "Aktuelle Superhits" ("Current Hits")	"Nobody Knows"	Pink	2/10 with 9.02%
2nd Mottoshow: "Die grössten Filmhits" ("Greatest Film Hits")	"I'm Every Woman"	Whitney Houston	5/9 with 7.28%
3rd Mottoshow: "Mariah Carey vs Take That"	"Without You"	Badfinger	5/8 with 6.12%
4th Mottoshow: "Greatest Hits"	"Flashdance... What a Feeling"	Irene Cara	6/7 with 5.97%
5th Mottoshow: "Judges' Choice"	"Für dich"	Yvonne Catterfeld	4/6 with 8.95%
6th Mottoshow: Partyhits und Akustik-Balladen" ("Party Music and Ballads")	"Let's Get Loud"	Jennifer Lopez	4/5 with 9.78%
6th Mottoshow: Partyhits und Akustik-Balladen" ("Party Music and Ballads")	"Killing Me Softly with His Song"	Roberta Flack	4/5 with 9.78%
7th Mottoshow: "Deutschland gegen England" ("Germany vs. England")	"You Might Need Somebody"	Randy Crawford	4/4 with 9.05%
7th Mottoshow: "Deutschland gegen England" ("Germany vs. England")	"Liebe ist alles"	Rosenstolz	4/4 with 9.05%

=== 2008–2009: I'm Gonna Make It ===
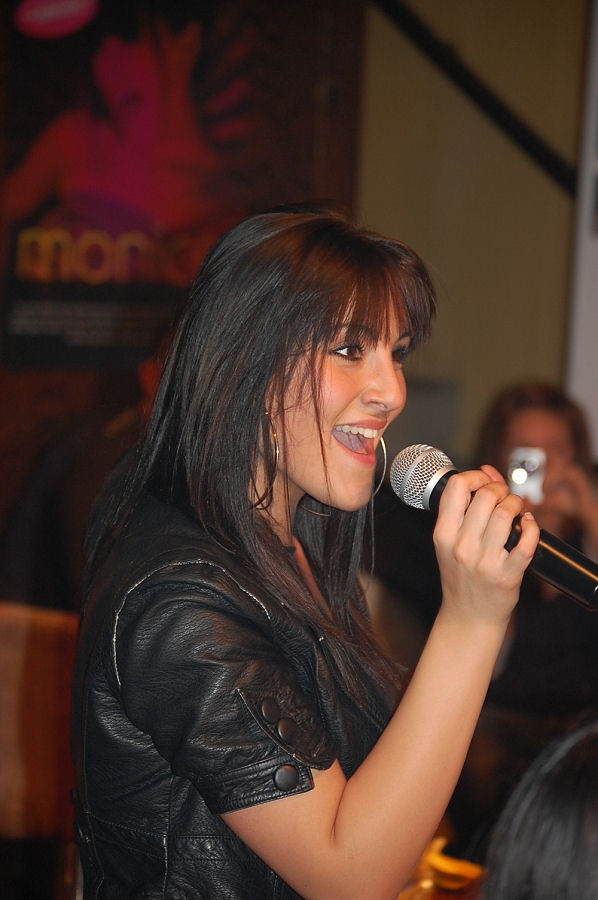
Monice in 2008

Following Deutschland sucht den Superstar, Ivkic did not sign a contract with a record label, citing a desire to express herself musically without being bound by the commercial constraints of her home market. Instead, she recorded a few songs and released them on her official YouTube channel. Later in 2008, she came out with the album I'm Gonna Make It, available for sale only through the Internet. Some of the songs were performed on Bosnian and Austrian TV but none of them garnered a following. The songs "I'm Gonna Make It" and "Only the Good Die Young" also received remixes.

I'm Gonna Make It was not the hoped-for success. Because of low sales, Ivkic first took a break and was still only looking at small events. She began changing her image at the end of 2008, attempting a shift from ballad singer to pop star, and looking to draw attention by dyeing her hair black and losing some weight.

=== 2010: Irish Eurovision Song Contest ===
On 10 February 2010, RTÉ announced that Ivkic would participate in the Irish national finals for the Eurovision Song Contest 2010 with a song called "Fashion Queen", where she later finished in third place. The song was released a few weeks later and reached number 86 in the Irish charts. With "Fashion Queen" she wanted to take off again in Germany and Austria, as well as internationally.

The song received mild controversy on several chat forums and radio stations, as it was claimed to have sounded very similar to Christina Aguilera's song "Candyman". It is nevertheless Ivkic's most successful single. The accompanying music video was also in rotation.

=== Book ===
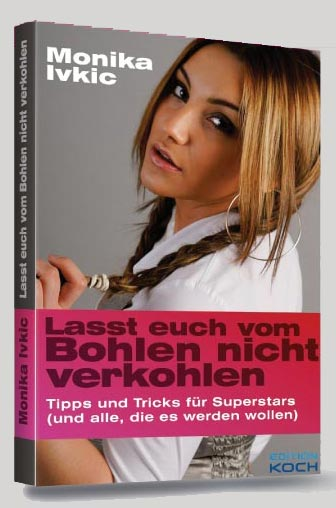
Ivkic's book Lasst euch vom Bohlen nicht verkohlen

In February 2009, Ivkic published a book called Lasst euch vom Bohlen nicht verkohlen – Tipps und Tricks für Superstars (und alle, die es werden wollen) (roughly: Don't let Bohlen Fool You: Tips and Tricks for Superstars (and Anybody Who Wants to Become One)). She describes how one behaves in casting shows and tricks and tips for people who want to apply there. Ivkic also describes her own impressions of the casting. The book, published in German only, was generally quite successful, above all in Austria.

== Discography ==
=== Singles ===
Single	Year	Peak chart positions	Album
Single	Year	IRL	Album
"Fashion Queen"	2010	86	
"Kerozin"	2018	–	

=== Sampler ===
Title	Year	Featuring	Album
"Fly Alone"	2008	Joined release of all finale participants of Deutschland sucht den Superstar (DSDS)	Fly Alone (DSDS (season 5))
"All for One"	2008	Joined release of all finale participants of Deutschland sucht den Superstar	Fly Alone (DSDS (season 5))
"I Can't Believe"	2008	Jermaine Alford	Fly Alone (DSDS (season 5))
"Behind the Rain"	2008	Sahra Drone	Fly Alone (DSDS (season 5))
"Don't Give It Up"	2008	Linda Teodosiu	Fly Alone (DSDS (season 5))

=== Other songs ===
- "I'm Gonna Make It" (2008)
- "Together We'll Be" (Christmas carol) (2008)
- "Boiz" (2009)
- "Fashionista" (2009)
- "Only the Good Die Young" (2009)
- "True" (2009)

=== Remixes ===
- "I'm Gonna Make It (Club Mix)" (2008)
- "Only the Good Die Young" (Club Mix)" (2009)
