= Bless (disambiguation) =

A blessing is a religious pronouncement. Bless may also refer to:

- 81355, an American hip-hop group pronounced "Bless"
- Bless (game), a massively multiplayer online role-playing game developed by Neowiz Games
- "Bless" (song), a 2010 single by L'Arc-en-Ciel
- Bless (band), a Swedish band also known as Bubbles
  - Bless (album), a 2003 album by Bubbles
- Bless (manga), a Japanese manga series by Yukino Sonoyama
- Bless Online, Korean MMORPG
- BLESS, a method in molecular biology for screening of DNA double-stranded breaks in the genome

== See also ==
- Blesse (disambiguation)
- Blessed (disambiguation)
- Blessing (disambiguation)
