= Blessed =

Blessed may refer to:

- The state of having received a blessing
- Blessed (Catholic), a title assigned by the Roman Catholic Church to someone who has received beatification, the penultimate stage of the canonization process
- Blessed (Orthodox), a saint title assigned by the Eastern Orthodox Church to various saints, typically fools for Christ and certain rulers and monastics

== Film and television ==
- Blessed (2004 film), a 2004 motion picture about a supernatural pregnancy
- Blessed (2008 film), a 2008 British drama film about a man looking after a shipwrecked girl on a Scottish island
- Blessed (2009 film), a 2009 Australian drama film about the lives of seven youths on the streets of Melbourne
- Blessed (TV series), a 2005 BBC television sitcom about a record producer and his struggles bringing up children

== Music ==
=== Albums ===
- Blessed (Beenie Man album), 1995
- Blessed (Flavour N'abania album), 2012
- Blessed (Hillsong album), 2002
- Blessed (Fady Maalouf album), 2008
- Blessed (Joe Maneri album), 1997
- Blessed (Lucinda Williams album), 2011
- B.L.E.S.S.E.D by EXID, 2020

=== Songs ===
- "Blessed" (Avicii song), 2011
- "Blessed" (Daniel Caesar song), 2017
- "Blessed" (Elton John song), 1995
- "Blessed" (Fady Maalouf song), 2008
- "Blessed" (GloRilla song), 2022
- "Blessed" (Jill Scott song), 2012
- "Blessed" (Martina McBride song), 2002
- "Blessed" (Rachael Lampa song)
- "Blessed" (Schoolboy Q song), 2012
- "Blessed", a 1971 song by Lazarus on the album Lazarus
- "Blessed", a 2022 song by Shenseea, from the album Alpha
- "Blessed", a 1966 song by Simon and Garfunkel, from the album Sounds of Silence
- "Blessed", a 2021 song by Tyler, the Creator, from the album Call Me If You Get Lost

== People ==
- Brian Blessed (born 1936), British actor
- Max Holloway, American MMA fighter nicknamed "Blessed"

== See also ==
- Blessed be (disambiguation)
