= Into the Light (Fady Maalouf album) =

Studio album by Fady Maalouf
- Released: 12 March 2010
- Recorded: 2010
- Genre: Pop
- Label: Columbia; Sony BMG
- Producer: Thorsten Brötzmann; Tim Hawes; Obi Mhondera; Ivo Moring

Fady Maalouf chronology
| Blessed (2008) | Into the Light (2010) | City of Gold (2012) |

Into the Light is the second album of Lebanese-German singer Fady Maalouf. It was released by Columbia Records and Sony BMG on 12 March 2010 in German-speaking Europe. Conceived after the major commercial success of hits debut album Blessed (2008) and its same-titled lead single, Maalouf worked with German producers Thorsten Brötzmann and Ivo Moring on the majority of its follow-up, with British musicians Tim Hawes and Obi Mhondera also contributing to the final track listing.

Upon its release, Into the Light reached number 33 on the German Albums Chart and number 42 on the Austrian Albums Chart but failed to chart in Switzerland. Its same-titled lead single entered the top fifty of the German Singles Chart. However, lackluster sales resulted into the termination of Maalouf's recording contract the following year, making Into the Light his final album with Columbia and Sony BMG.

== Track listing ==
Credits adapted from the liner notes of Into the Light.

| No. | Title | Writer(s) | Length |
|---|---|---|---|
| 1. | "Kissing Moonlight" | Mark Smith; Charlie Mason; Fady Maalouf | 4:06 |
| 2. | "Into the Light" | Andy Love; Ivo Moring; Maalouf | 3:33 |
| 3. | "My Heart" | Tom Nichols; Per Eklund; Svante Halldin; Emilh Tigerlantz | 3:31 |
| 4. | "Holding On the Water" | Robin Grubert; Alexander Zuckowski; Johnny Andrews | 3:23 |
| 5. | "Anytime" | Mike Busbee; Alex James | 3:41 |
| 6. | "Missing Your Face" | John Gordon; Maalouf; Lars Wallem; David Voigt | 3:27 |
| 7. | "I Still Cry" | Alex Geringas; Maalouf; Stefan Knoess | 4:01 |
| 8. | "Some Music" | Patrik Berger; Jan Lundkvist | 3:16 |
| 9. | "Fire" | Tim Hawes; Obi Mhondera; Maalouf | 3:39 |
| 10. | "Burn" | Love; Emanuel Olsson | 4:13 |
| 11. | "Listen to Your Heart" | Per Gessle; Mats P. Persson | 3:51 |
| 12. | "Vers les étoiles" | Geringas; Mason; Maalouf; Bernd Klimpel | 3:38 |
| 13. | "Summer Rain" | Geringas; Mason; Klimpel | 3:31 |

== Charts ==
| Chart (2010) | Peak position |
|---|---|
| Austrian Albums (Ö3 Austria) | 42 |
| German Albums (Offizielle Top 100) | 33 |
