= Blessed be =

Blessed be may refer to

- A modern Pagan or Wiccan blessing
- Blessed Be, a 2000 album by The 69 Eyes

== See also ==
- Fivefold kiss
