= Amazed =

1999 single by Lonestar

Single by Lonestar

from the album Lonely Grill
- B-side: "Tell Her"
- Released: March 22, 1999
- Genre: Country pop
- Length: 4:00 (album version); 4:29 (pop remix); 4:22 (2023 version)
- Label: BNA
- Songwriters: Marv Green; Chris Lindsey; Aimee Mayo
- Producers: Dann Huff; Brian Tankersley (remix)

Lonestar singles chronology
"Saturday Night" (1999)	"Amazed" (1999)	"Smile" (1999)

Alternate cover
- Alternate US pop cover

Music video
- "Amazed" on YouTube

"Amazed" is a song by American country music group Lonestar, released on March 22, 1999, to country radio as the second single from their third studio album Lonely Grill (1999). The power ballad is the band's longest-lasting number-one single and biggest hit, spending eight weeks atop the Billboard Hot Country Singles & Tracks chart. The song was written by Marv Green, Aimee Mayo, and Chris Lindsey. A pop remix of the song reached number one on the Billboard Hot 100 and number two on the Billboard Adult Contemporary chart in 2000. The song has sold over 1,650,000 digital copies in the US as of February 2016.

Since the release of the original, the song has been covered by Bonnie Tyler, Duncan James, and Fady Maalouf, all of whom have released their respective versions as singles. Ben Mills, Boyz II Men and Shane Filan of Westlife have included covers in their respective albums. On The Sing-Off (season 4, episode 3), judge Shawn Stockman, of Boyz II Men fame, mentioned that the song had been offered to them first, and they decided to turn it down.

== Content ==
The song was written by songwriters Marv Green, Aimee Mayo, and Chris Lindsey. At the time of the songwriting, Mayo and Lindsey had begun dating and drew inspiration from their romance for the song. Mayo said "Our feelings for each other just started coming out as we were writing." "Amazed" was then given to Lonestar for their 1999 album Lonely Grill and released as the album's lead single. The verses are in the key of A♭ major, with the pre-chorus in the key of B major, and the chorus in the key of D♭ major, with a vocal range from F3 to A♭4.

== Critical reception ==
A review in Billboard was mostly favorable, praising Richie McDonald's lead vocals for "perfectly convey[ing] the tenderness and wonder felt in a loving relationship" but saying that some of the lyrics were "a little too clichéd".

== Chart performance ==
The song reached number one on the Billboard Hot Country Singles & Tracks chart and remained there for eight consecutive weeks until it was knocked off by "Single White Female" by Chely Wright. With this accomplishment, it set a record for the longest run at number one on the country chart since Nielsen Broadcast Data Systems was initiated in 1990. This run was later tied by Alan Jackson and Jimmy Buffett's 2003 single "It's Five O'Clock Somewhere", and later surpassed by Morgan Wallen's "You Proof" in 2023, which spent ten non-consecutive weeks at number one. "Amazed" spent 41 weeks on the country singles chart, giving it the second-longest chart run of any country single in the 1990s. In addition, the single crossed over into the pop airwaves entering the Billboard Hot 100 at number 81. It peaked at number 24 before falling off the Hot 100.

The song was then remixed for pop radio (a tactic commonly used to present country-leaning songs to mainstream audiences) by Brian Tankersley, who redid the entire backing track with session musicians and added a new key change to D major for the final chorus and A minor for the outro; also having lead singer Richie McDonald re-record his vocals for the final portion of the remix in the new key. The new mix's popularity prompted the single to re-enter the Hot 100 at number 45. On this second chart run, it reached number one on March 4, 2000. In doing so, it became the first power ballad to top the chart since Aerosmith's "I Don't Want to Miss a Thing" in 1998, as well as the first new country song to top the pop charts since Kenny Rogers and Dolly Parton's 1983 duet "Islands in the Stream". It also made Lonestar the first country band to place a song in the top 10 of the Hot 100 year-end countdown. All remixes of the song made the single spend a combined total of 55 weeks on the Hot 100 and 41 weeks on Hot Country Singles & Tracks chart. It had sold 1,628,000 digital copies in the US as of December 2015.

Only five years after "Amazed" topped the Billboard Hot 100 did another country song top the chart, as Carrie Underwood's "Inside Your Heaven" debuted at number one on the Hot 100, in June 2005. "Amazed" and "Inside Your Heaven" are the only country songs in the 2000s decade to hit number one on the Hot 100. In the United Kingdom, "Amazed" reached a peak of number 21 and spent 22 weeks in the charts. It spent 17 weeks in the top 40 without entering the top 20.

== Music video ==
Trey Fanjoy directed the music video for Lonestar's rendition. It premiered on CMT on July 20, 1999. It features the band performing the song in a dark room, and a model making seductive poses. The model is portrayed by Sunny Mabrey. This was the first video that Lonestar members do not wear cowboy hats, and Keech Rainwater no longer has long hair. The original music video uses the album version for country channels; a second video was created from the footage for the song's pop remix and served to international and pop stations.

== 2023 version ==
In mid-2023, following the replacement of longtime lead vocalist Richie McDonald with former Sons of the Desert lead vocalist Drew Womack, the band re-recorded the song with Womack. This rendition will be included on the album Ten to 1, including all of the band's major hits re-recorded with Womack's vocals. Simultaneously, after McDonald joined former Little Texas member Tim Rushlow and former Restless Heart member Larry Stewart in The Frontmen, that group also released a re-recording of "Amazed" with McDonald on lead vocals.

== Track listings ==
US CD and cassette single

1. "Amazed" (Captain mix)
2. "Amazed" (AC mix)

US 7-inch single 1

A. "Amazed" – 4:00
B. "Tell Her" – 3:26

US 7-inch single 2

A. "Smile" – 3:30
B. "Amazed" – 4:00

Australian CD single

1. "Amazed"
2. "Amazed" (AC mix)

UK CD1 and cassette single

1. "Amazed" (Captain mix) – 4:29
2. "Amazed" (Huff mix) – 4:02
3. "Amazed" (acoustic mix) – 3:58

UK CD2

1. "Amazed" (mainstream mix)
2. "Amazed" (Huff mix)
3. "Amazed" (mainstream mix acoustic version)

European CD single

1. "Amazed" (Captain mix) – 4:29
2. "Amazed" (Huff mix) – 4:02

== Charts ==
=== Weekly charts ===
Chart (1999–2000)	Peak position
Australia (ARIA)	19
Canada Top Singles (RPM)	7
Canada Adult Contemporary (RPM)	1
Canada Country Singles (RPM)	1
Europe (Eurochart Hot 100)	62
Germany (GfK)	91
Iceland (Íslenski Listinn Topp 40)	25
Ireland (IRMA)	2
New Zealand (Recorded Music NZ)	11
Norway (VG-lista)	10
Scottish Singles Sales (Official Charts)	17
UK Singles (Official Charts)	21
UK Indie (Official Charts)	5
US Billboard Hot 100	1
US Adult Contemporary (Billboard)	2
US Adult Pop Airplay (Billboard)	7
US Hot Country Songs (Billboard)	1
US Pop Airplay (Billboard)	7

=== Year-end charts ===
Chart (1999)	Position
Canada Country Tracks (RPM)	1
US Billboard Hot 100	85
US Adult Contemporary (Billboard)	47
US Hot Country Singles & Tracks (Billboard)	1

Chart (2000)	Position
Australia (ARIA)	49
Ireland (IRMA)	12
New Zealand (RIANZ)	44
UK Singles (OCC)	69
US Billboard Hot 100	8
US Adult Contemporary (Billboard)	2
US Adult Top 40 (Billboard)	15
US Mainstream Top 40 (Billboard)	42

Chart (2001)	Position
US Adult Contemporary (Billboard)	19

== Certifications ==
Region	Certification	Certified units/sales
Australia (ARIA)	Gold	35,000^{^}
United Kingdom (BPI)	Platinum	600,000^{‡}
United States (RIAA) (physical)	Gold	500,000
United States (RIAA) (digital)	Gold	1,650,000
United States (RIAA) (mastertone)	Gold	500,000^{*}
^{*} Sales figures based on certification alone.^{^} Shipments figures based on certification alone.^{‡} Sales+streaming figures based on certification alone.

== Release history ==
Region	Date	Format(s)	Label(s)	Ref.
United States	March 22, 1999	Country radio	BNA	
United States	February 8, 2000	CD; cassette	BNA	
United Kingdom	March 27, 2000	CD; cassette	BNA; BMG	

== Duncan James version ==
"Amazed"

Single by Duncan James

from the album Future Past
- B-side: "Save This Moment for Me"; "Part Time Love"; "You Can"
- Released: September 29, 2006
- Length: 3:58
- Label: Innocent
- Songwriters: Marv Green; Chris Lindsey; Aimee Mayo
- Producer: Matt Prime

Duncan James singles chronology
"Can't Stop a River" (2006)	"Amazed" (2006)

Music video
- "Amazed" on YouTube

English singer Duncan James recorded a version of "Amazed" from his debut studio album Future Past (2006). The song was released as third and final single on September 29, 2006, only in Italy and Germany. It was planned for a UK release on March 12, 2007, but was canceled when James was fired from the label in January 2007.

=== Track listings ===
Italy CD single

1. "Amazed" (radio edit) – 3:57
2. "Save This Moment for Me" – 4:42

Germany CD1

1. "Amazed" (radio edit) – 3:57
2. "Part Time Love" – 4:01

Germany CD2

1. "Amazed" (radio edit) – 3:57
2. "You Can" – 3:55
3. "Part Time Love" – 4:01
4. "Amazed" (video clip) – 3:57

=== Charts ===
Chart (2007)	Peak position
Italy (FIMI)	41
Italy (Musica e dischi)	21

== Fady Maalouf version ==
"Amazed"

Single by Fady Maalouf

from the album Blessed
- B-side: 1. "Vole mon ame" 2. "Show Me Your Love" (dance version)
- Released: 2008
- Recorded: 2008
- Label: Columbia Deutschland
- Songwriters: Marv Green; Chris Lindsey; Aimee Mayo

Fady Maalouf singles chronology
"Blessed" (2008)	"Amazed" (2008)	"Show Me Your Love" (2009)

Music video
- "Amazed" on YouTube

In 2008, the runner up of the fifth season of Deutschland sucht den Superstar, the German version of Pop Idol, the Lebanese-German singer Fady Maalouf released a cover version of the song as his second single release immediately after the big success of his debut single "Blessed". The song also appears in his debut Blessed album's double CD rerelease, titled Blessed: New Edition.

Maalouf's version was a hit in Germany where it reached number 26 on the German Singles Chart. It also charted in Austria, reaching number 52 on the Austrian Singles Chart.

=== Track listings ===
CD single

1. "Amazed" – (3:58)
2. "Vole mon ame" – (3:42)

CD maxi

1. "Amazed" – (3:58)
2. "Vole mon ame" – (3:42)
3. "Show Me Your Love" (dance version) – (4:31)
4. "Amazed" (instrumental) – (3:58)
5. "Amazed" (video)

=== Charts ===
Chart (2009)	Peak position
Austria (Ö3 Austria Top 40)	52
Germany (GfK)	26

== References in other media ==
In 2014, country music duo Haley & Michaels co-wrote their debut single "Just Another Love Song" with Lonestar lead vocalist Richie McDonald. The song makes lyrical reference to "Amazed", and features McDonald singing its chorus. The song is featured in the opening scene of the 2025 film Heart Eyes.
