= The Blessing =

The Blessing may refer to:

- The Blessing (jazz quartet), a British jazz rock quartet, now known as Get the Blessing
- The Blessing (novel), a novel by Nancy Mitford
- The Blessing (rock band), a British rock band
- The Blessing (David "Fathead" Newman album), 2009
- The Blessing (Kari Jobe album), 2020
- "The Blessing (song)", a 2020 song by Kari Jobe, Cody Carnes and Elevation Worship
- The Blessing of Burntisland, Charles I of England's treasure ship
- "Shukufuku", a 2022 song by Yoasobi, in which the English title is "The Blessing"

== See also ==
- Blessing (disambiguation)
