= Rania Zeriri =

Dutch singer

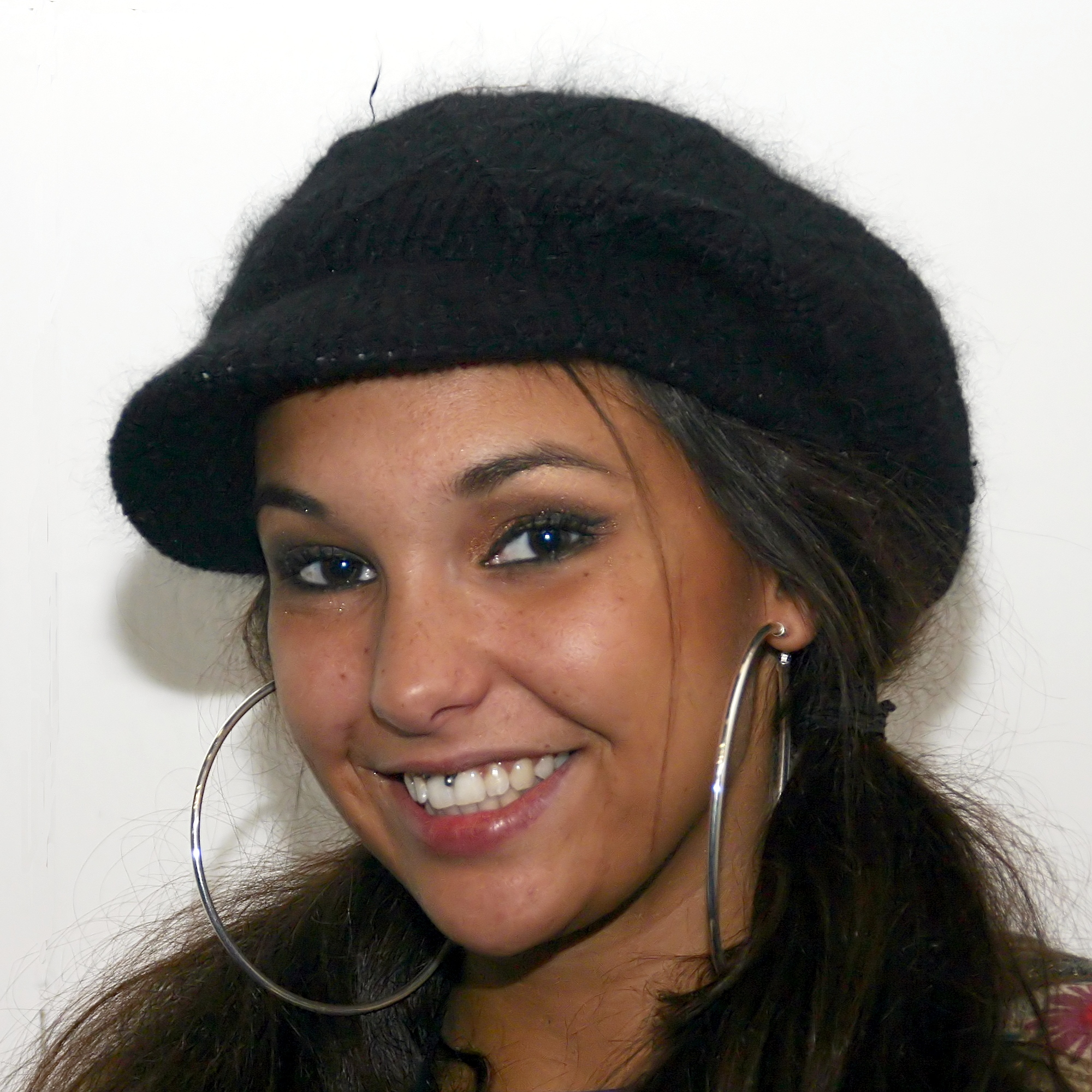
- Youth fair YOU, Berlin, October 2008

Background information
- Also known as: Rania
- Born: Rania Zeriri; 6 January 1986 (age 40)
- Origin: Enschede, Netherlands
- Genre: Pop music
- Occupation: Singer
- Years active: 2005–?
- Labels: Kontor Records, EMI

Rania Zeriri (born 6 January 1986) is a Dutch singer. Most notably, she finished fifth in the German reality talent show Deutschland sucht den Superstar in 2008.

== Early life ==
Rania Zeriri grew up in the Netherlands as the daughter of a Dutch mother and an Algerian father who left the family when she was still very young. After finishing school with a General Certificate of Secondary Education (Mittlere Reife), she moved at the age of 17 to Salamanca to study Spanish.

Later, she acquired a hotel animation diploma and then worked mainly on Ibiza and Fuerteventura where she also started to perform as a singer in hotels.

== Music career ==
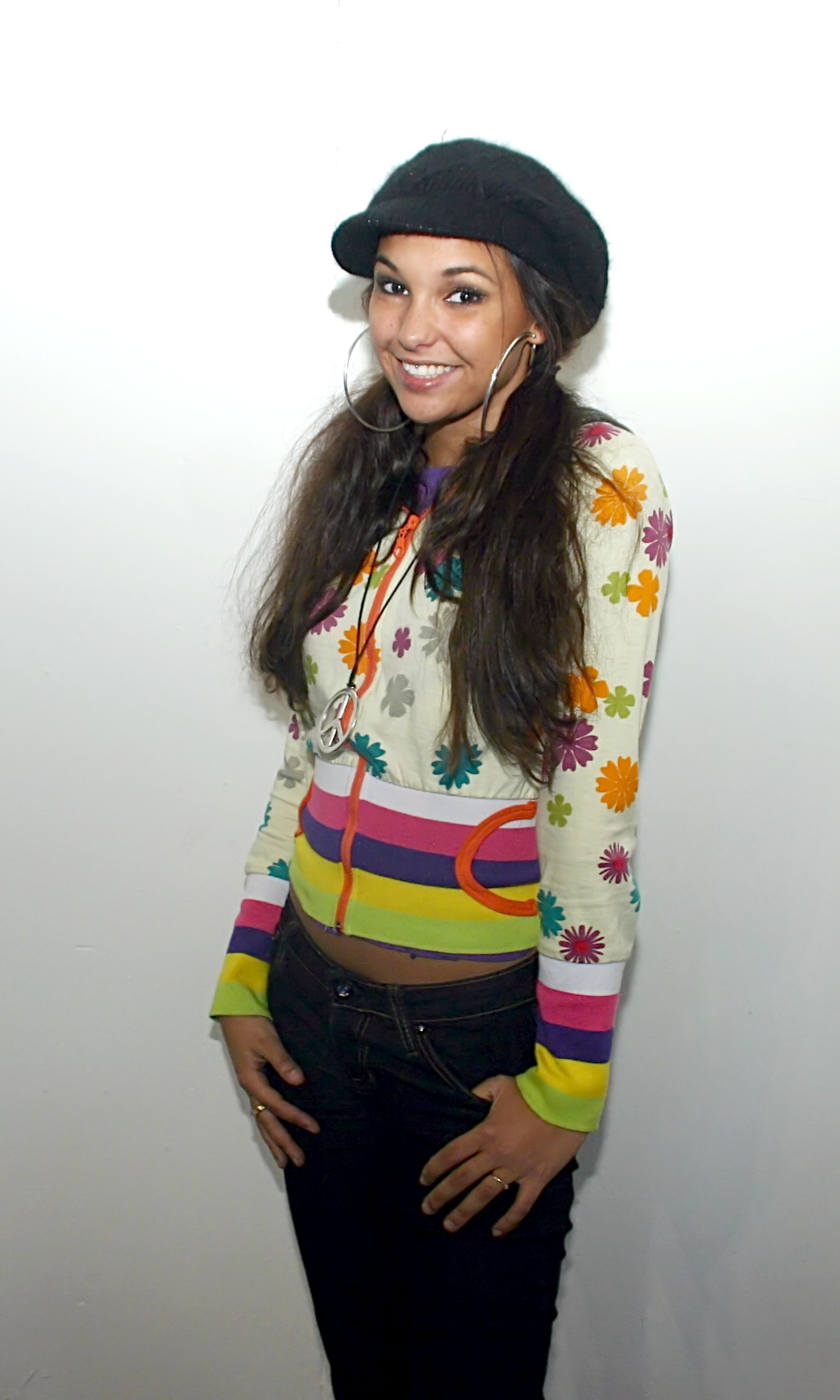
Zeriri at the Youth fair YOU, Berlin, October 2008

Rania Zeriri gained national recognition as a contestant and 'Top 5' finalist in the 2008 German "Idol" version Deutschland sucht den Superstar (DSDS) broadcast by RTL. She finished in fifth place.

After the DSDS show, Zeriri performed throughout Germany and performed before the final of the European Football Championship at the fan area at the Brandenburg Gate, Berlin, in front of several hundred thousand visitors. Zeriris debut solo maxi single Crying Undercover was released on 14 November 2008 by the record label Kontor Records. The title song was written for the singer by Achim Jannsen, a writer who produced several cover-songs for Jan Wayne, together with the musician Claas P. Jambor, a member of the Zeichen der Zeit project. The CD contains also the song Cursed And Blessed written by Zeriri in 2006 and the video of the title song. The single reached position 86 in the Germany Singles Top 100.

=== DSDS controversies ===
Although Rania Zeriri started the last phase of the competition as one of the favourites she received later controversial press coverage, especially from the German newspaper Bild. On 24 April 2008 Bild appeared with an article suggesting that contestants of the show might have used drugs in the dressing room area singling out Zeriri as potential culprit. However, the accusation was never proven and Zeriri made new headlines when she publicly voiced her opinion that a requested drug test should not only include the contestants but also the jury, openly stated her increasing discomfort in participating in the show and directly criticised the juror Dieter Bohlen.

== Personal life ==
Zeriri was born with holes in her vocal cords. Her dark voice is the result of an operation which was necessary to close the inborn holes using laser treatment. This caused her difficulties to sing high notes and in the falsetto register.

In 2010, Zeriri started to study at the Enschede Conservatory a branch of ArtEZ. She also works as a reporter with the regional broadcaster TV Enschede FM. After she reached the Top 10 of the fifth season of the German television contest Deutschland sucht den Superstar (DSDS) in 2008, she resigned from her job and moved to Gronau-Epe in Germany to live with her mother.

In February 2025, the pop star was intercepted in Mercogliano, Avellino, Italy, where she lived as a homeless person: the city administration mobilized to help her. As of 25 February 2025, she is receiving mental health support from the municipality of Mercogliano.

== Discography ==

=== Sampler ===
- 2008 Fly Alone (joined release of all finale participants of Deutschland sucht den Superstar)

=== Maxi single ===
- 2008 Crying Undercover
