= Show Me Your Love (Fady Maalouf song) =

Single by Fady Maalouf

from the album Blessed: New Edition
- Released: 2009
- Recorded: 2008
- Genre: Pop
- Label: Columbia
- Songwriter(s): Alex Christensen; Steffen Häfelinger

Fady Maalouf singles chronology
"Amazed" (2008)	"Show Me Your Love" (2009)	"Into the Light" (2010)

Music video
- "Show Me Your Love" on YouTube

"Show Me Your Love" is the third English language single by Lebanese-German singer Fady Maalouf from the Blessed. Although it did not appear in the original Blessed released after he became runner-up in 2008 of Deutschland sucht den Superstar, however it was included in the Blessed: New Edition (Double CD) released a double CD package on 28 November 2008 that includes same materials as the original release but also new unreleased tracksand new versions including two versions of "Show Me Your Love" (the single version and the videoclip version).

== Music video ==
The music video is shot around and inside a pool with Fady Maalouf singing most of the sing under water. The concept of the video was Fady Maalouf's own as he said to Al Arabiyya satellite station reporter.
