= Blesse =

Blesse may refer to:

- De Blesse, a village in Friesland, Netherlands
- Frederick C. Blesse (1921-2012), United States Air Force major general and flying ace

== See also ==
- Bless (disambiguation)
