= Haley & Michaels =

American country music duo

- Origin: Nashville, Tennessee
- Genres: Country
- Years active: 2011–present
- Labels: H&M Music, Hickory Records
- Members: Shannon Haley; Ryan Michaels
- Website: haleyandmichaels.com

Haley & Michaels is an American country music duo composed of Shannon Haley and Ryan Michaels, both born in California. They released an extended play, Haley & Michaels, independently on October 21, 2014, and a full album Hail Mary on November 15, 2019 under the label Hickory Records.

== Career ==
Shannon Haley and Ryan Michaels met in January 2011, introduced by friends at a coffee shop in Nashville, Tennessee. They married on May 9, 2015 in Saratoga, California. In March 2020, they announced expecting their first child a daughter in early October.

They released their debut single, "Just Another Love Song", in April 2014. They co-wrote the song with Richie McDonald of Lonestar; the song itself references that band's 1999 hit "Amazed", and features McDonald singing that song's chorus. It peaked at number 59 on the Billboard Country Airplay chart in January 2015.

In January 2018, the duo were signed to Hickory Records. Their first single released under the label was "All Out".

in 2019, their song "Hail Mary" was used as the anthem for the 2019 season by the San Francisco 49ers. It was also featured in the Netflix film Walk. Ride. Rodeo. They released their first full album, Hail Mary, in November 2019.

== Discography ==
=== Albums ===
Title	Album details
Hail Mary	Release date: November 15, 2019; Label: Hickory Records

=== Extended plays ===
Title	Album details
Haley & Michaels	Release date: October 21, 2014; Label: H&M Music

=== Singles ===
Year	Single	Peak positions	Album
Year	Single	US Country Airplay	Album
2014	"Just Another Love Song"	59	Haley & Michaels
2014	"500 Miles"	—	Haley & Michaels
2015	"One More Night to Break"	—	Haley & Michaels
2015	"Giving It All (To You)"	—	TBD
2017	"Me Too"	—	
2018	"All Out"	—	Hail Mary
2018	"Taking Off"	—	
2018	"High Note"	—	Hail Mary
2019	"Hail Mary"	—	Hail Mary
"—" denotes releases that did not chart

=== Music videos ===
Year	Video	Director
2013	"The Price I Pay"	Annie Price
2014	"Just Another Love Song"	Shane Drake
2015	"Giving It All (To You)"	
2018	"Me Too"	Tommy Douglas
2019	"Hail Mary"	
