= University of Bunda Mulia =

University in Jakarta Utara, Indonesia

- Universitas Bunda Mulia
- Type: Private university
- Established: June 10, 2003
- Founder: Djoko Susanto
- Rector: Doddy Surja Bajuadji, SE, MBA
- Location: Jl. Lodan Raya No. 2, Ancol, Jakarta Utara, Indonesia; 6.1302886999999995°S 106.8184124°E
- Colors: Blue, creamy yellow and grey
- Website: http://www.ubm.ac.id

Universitas Bunda Mulia (UBM) is a private university in Indonesia, with a primary campus located in North Jakarta. UBM is one of the few higher education institutions in Indonesia that has received dual accreditation: "Unggul" (Excellent) from BAN-PT and "International" from ASIIN.

== History ==
The embryo of the University of Bunda Mulia was from the merger of two higher-education institutions, Bunda Mulia's School of Informatics and Information Management (also known as Indonesian: Sekolah Tinggi Manajemen Informatika dan Komputer Bunda Mulia, or simply "Indonesian: STMIK Bunda Mulia", or Bunda Mulia School of Informatics and Computing) and Bunda Mulia's School of Economics (also known as Indonesian: Sekolah Tinggi Ilmu Ekonomi Bunda Mulia, or simply "Indonesian: STIE Bunda Mulia", or Bunda Mulia School of Business).

It was started from the establishment of the Bunda Mulia Information Management and Computer Academy (Indonesian: AMIK Bunda Mulia) by decrees of December 11, 1986 and March 30, 1987. Then, in 1995 by decree of the Directorate General of Higher Education dated October 10, 1995, the AMIK Bunda Mulia transformed into the Indonesian: STMIK Bunda Mulia.

The Indonesian: STMIK Bunda Mulia was granted permission by the Indonesian government (through the Minister of National Education's decree) to change its status into the "University of Bunda Mulia", in which was included the granting of the incorporation of Indonesian: STMIK Bunda Mulia and Indonesian: STIE Bunda Mulia and the addition of new study programs to form its new university status.

Along with the improvement of the Bunda Mulia's higher-education status in 2003, Yayasan Pendidikan Bunda Mulia developed a second campus situated in Jl. Lodan Kingdom No. 2, North Jakarta, with a land area of 45,000 m2. Compared to the first campus which is located on Jl. AM Sangaji No. 20, Central Jakarta, the new campus is more sophisticated, and equipped with the latest information technology facilities and infrastructures, as well as the high-speed Internet connection.

== UBM logo ==
=== Meaning of typography ===
The typography of UBM's logo, which is an acronym of the University of Bunda Mulia, is in lowercase and representing UBM's spirit of humility in its journey to always provide significant contributions to the development of information technology.

=== Symbolism ===
Circle ellipse (oval round) with a point-point graded curriculum symbolizes the University of Bunda Mulia's search to improve the quality of human resources engaged in globalization and the flow of information.

=== Meaning of colors ===
- Blue is the color of engineering/technology.
- Creamy yellow symbolizes the advanced nature of thinking, innovative, sharp and brilliant in thought.
- Gray represents the progress of thought, modernity, and intelligence.

== Mascot ==
BieM is the official mascot and symbol of Universitas Bunda Mulia's academic community. With four core values, BieM serves as both a role model and a visual representation of the university:

- Smart – Intelligent and knowledgeable
- Diligent – Persistent and hardworking
- Sincere – Genuine and wholehearted
- Helpful – Always willing to assist others

== Student Achievements ==
Some of the achievements achieved by UBM students include:

== Academic Achievements ==
The following are the academic achievements of each study program at Universitas Bunda Mulia:

- Students from the Hospitality and Tourism study program won a Silver Medal, Bronze Medal, Diploma Medal, and Silver Medal in the Korean Beef Main Course, French Stuffed Cabbage, Western Beef Main Course, Asian Chicken Main Course, and Western Plated Dessert competitions held from November 13, 2024.

== Student Associations ==
The following are the student associations from each department at Universitas Bunda Mulia, including:

- HIMSI, Information Systems
- ACCASIA, Accounting
- ACES, English Language and Culture
- BIOS, Informatics Engineering
- CHINESE LANGUAGE COMMUNITY (CLC), Chinese Language and Culture
- COMRADE, Communication Science
- EXODUS, Digital Business
- HIMA HOSPAR, Hospitality and Tourism
- HIMAPSI, Psychology
- IRIX, Interactive Design
- QHIVE, Data Science
- TOTEMANIA, Visual Communication Design
- XCM, Management

== Student Activity ==
The following are Student Activity Units at Universitas Bunda Mulia:

- Aikido
- Badminton
- Basketball
- Dance (BIEFINDC)
- E-Sports
- Futsal
- iCare
- Muay Thai
- FISH Senate (Faculty of Social Sciences and Humanities)
- FTD Senate (Faculty of Technology and Design)
- Taekwondo
- Talent
- Tartra
- Theater
- The VOU (Voice of UBM)
- Wushu
- Biemers Entrepreneur Club Community
- Debate Community

== Student Spiritual Activity ==
The following are the Spiritual Activity Units at Universitas Bunda Mulia, including:

- IKAMI (Islamic Student Association)
- JIC (Jesus in My Campus)
- KMB (Buddhist Student Family)
- KMK (Catholic Student Family)

== Study Programs ==
Universitas Bunda Mulia offers the following study programs:

=== Undergraduate (S1) ===
==== Faculty of Technology and Design ====
- Artificial Intelligence, Bachelor of Computer Science (S.Kom.)
- Information Systems, Bachelor of Computer Science (S.Kom.)
- Informatics Engineering, Bachelor of Computer Science (S.Kom.)
- Data Science, Bachelor of Data Science (S.Si.D.)
- Interactive Design, Bachelor of Design (S.Ds.)
- Visual Communication Design, Bachelor of Design (S.Ds.)

==== Faculty of Social Sciences and Humanities ====
- Management, Bachelor of Economics (S.E.)
- Accounting, Bachelor of Economics (S.E.)
- Psychology, Bachelor of Psychology (S.Psi.)
- Communication Science, Bachelor of Communication Science (S.Ikom.)
- Digital Business, Bachelor of Business (S.Bns.)
- English Culture and Language, Bachelor of Humanities (S.Hum.)
- Chinese Culture and Language, Bachelor of Humanities (S.Hum.)
- Hospitality and Tourism, Bachelor of Tourism (S.Par.)

=== Master's degree (S2) ===
- Master of Management (M.M.), equivalent to a Master of Management / Master of Business Administration
- Master of Communication Studies (M.Ikom.)
- Master of Information Technology (M.Kom.)

==== Long Distance Learning (S1) ====
- Management (Online), Bachelor of Economics (S.E.)
- Accounting (Online), Bachelor of Economics (S.E.)\

== Alumnus ==
- Arumi Bachsin, Indonesian model and actress
- Benny Prawira Siauw, Suicidology
- Gisella Anastasia, Singer, Actor, Presenter, and Model
- Kevin Krisma Joanito Gea, Singer
- Petrus Canisius Hanar Mahendra, Singer
- Riana Graharani, Magician

== Campus Location ==
Universitas Bunda Mulia has two different campuses.[8]

- Ancol Campus

Jl. Lodan Raya No. 2 Ancol, North Jakarta 14430

- Serpong Campus

Jl. Jalur Sutera Barat Kav. 7-9 Alam Sutera, Tangerang 15143

== See also ==
- List of universities in Indonesia
- Education in Indonesia
