= Benny Prawira Siauw =

Personal details
- Born: 1 February 1989 (age 37) Jakarta, Indonesia
- Education: Bunda Mulia University; Atma Jaya Catholic University of Indonesia
- Occupation: Suicidologist; Founder of Into The Light Indonesia

Benny Prawira Siauw (born 1 February 1989) is a suicidologist, founder and head coordinator of Into The Light Indonesia community, which focuses on suicide prevention in Indonesia.

== Background and education ==
Siauw received his Bachelor of Psychology from the University of Bunda Mulia and Master of Social Health Psychology from the Atma Jaya Catholic University of Indonesia.

Between 2013 and 2015, Siauw was one of the members of the Youth Advisory Board of the National Center for The Prevention of Youth Suicide, a research institution founded by the American Association of Suicidology with a focus on suicide prevention among youths.

== Into The Light Indonesia ==
Siauw founded Into The Light Indonesia in 2012 after he found several suicide news reports from Indonesian online media and after he revealed some of his friends were having suicidal thoughts.

In 2013, Siauw and some friends formed an ad-hoc committee to commemorate World Suicide Prevention Day 2013 titled "Into The Light". The ad-hoc was later changed into a community afterwards, and since then, was the first Indonesian youth-based suicide prevention community. Along with his vision, the community is based on, and uses, scientific and human rights-based approaches.

Siauw was featured in several prominent Indonesian media outlets, including Opini.id, Kick Andy on Metro TV, Liputan 6, and SINDOnews.com.
