= Fady Maalouf =

German singer

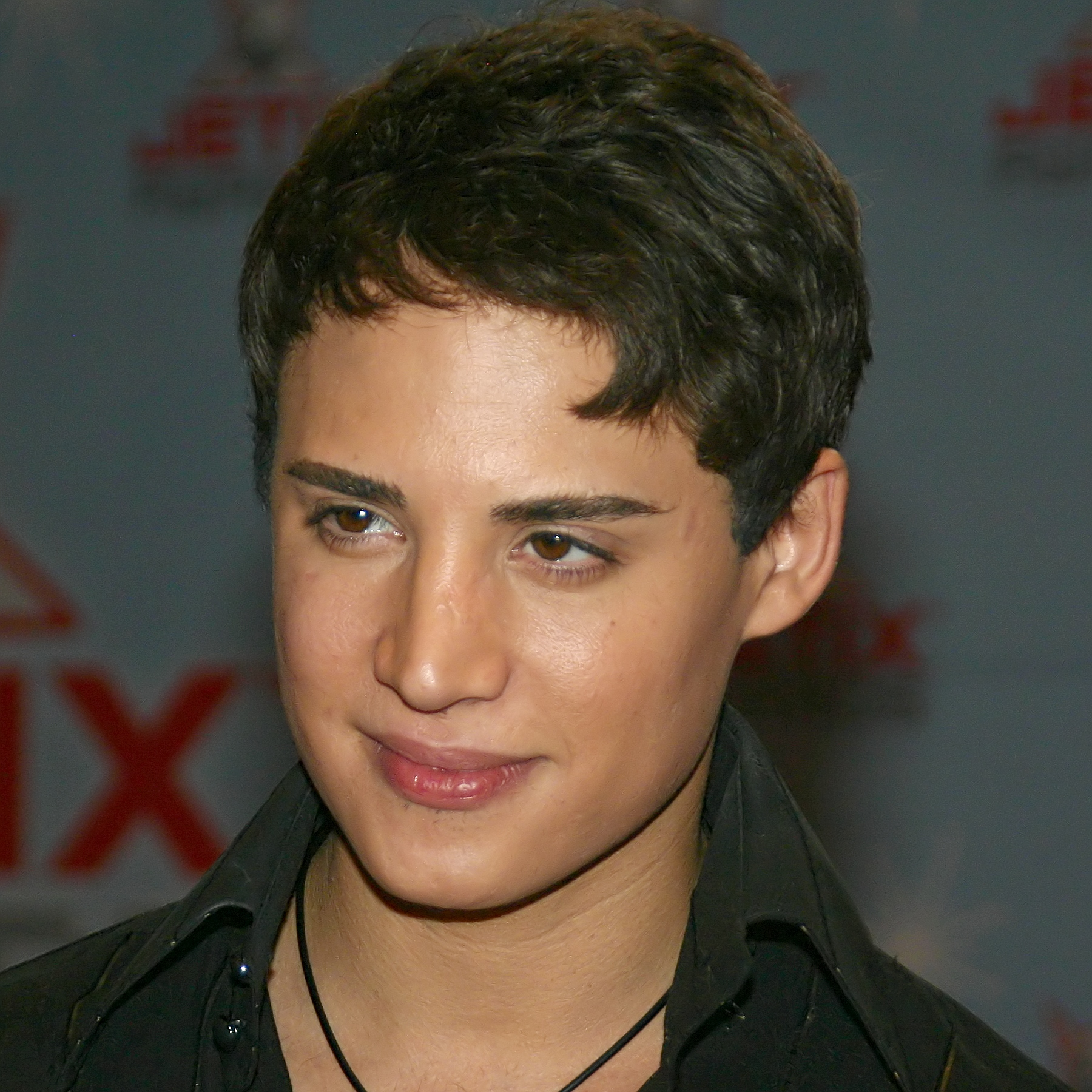
- Maalouf in 2008.

Background information
- Born: 20 April 1979 (age 47); Zahlé, Lebanon
- Genres: Pop; crossover
- Occupations: Singer; songwriter; painter
- Years active: 2008–present

Fady Maalouf (Arabic: فادي معلوف pronounced Fādī Maʿlūf; born on 20 April 1979) is a German–Lebanese pop and crossover opera singer. He is known as the runner up of the fifth season of Deutschland sucht den Superstar, the German version of Pop Idol. He has released three albums to date, Blessed (2008), Into the Light (2010) and City of Gold (2012). He also released his EP Indigo (2017).

== Early life ==
Maalouf was born to a Lebanese family and his father Mounir Maalouf had German roots. He started at a very early age to show interest in music and singing. He sang in a church children's choir and took some piano lessons. Later on he received professional voice training with a vocal coach. Aged 17, he started performing as a club singer in piano bars, night clubs, as well as events and galas in Lebanon. He also made some Arabic language songs using the artistic name Alex, including the single "Ya Leil" written and composed by Fady Maalouf himself, accompanied by a music video and a cover of "Hebbina Hebbina" from Farid al-Atrash.

Besides singing, he studied fashion design, earned a degree and made an internship with the now famous Lebanese international fashion designer Elie Saab. He also lived for a time in a French town near Bordeaux, France. and shared his time between Lebanon and France. During the civil war in Lebanon, he was wounded by shrapnel in his face and had to undergo a series of facial operations for recovery. When in 2006 the political situation in Beirut worsened, he went to his half-brother in Germany where he worked in Hamburg as a barista (espresso specialist).

== Career ==
=== 2007–08: Deutschland sucht den Superstar ===
Having lived in Hamburg for only 10 months, upon insistence from his friends, he auditioned for the German reality show Deutschland sucht den Superstar (DSDS, the German version of Pop Idol or Superstar) in autumn 2007. He reached the finals of the show, where on 17 May 2008 he competed against Thomas Godoj in finale where Maalouf received 37.8% of the public votes finishing in the second place.

The song "Blessed" was written for Fady by Jörgen Elofsson and Peer Åström, to be released as the winning song in case Fady won. Elofsson and Åströma were a songwriter team of international standing, who have worked with such names as Kelly Clarkson, Leona Lewis, Madonna, Britney Spears, Cyndi Lauper, Il Divo, and especially Céline Dion. The song was produced by Alex Christensen, who has worked with artists such as Justin Timberlake, Tom Jones, Paul Anka or Michael Bolton. He sang the song on 17 May 2008, in the final showdown between him and Thomas Godoj who eventually won.

=== 2009–present: Career development ===
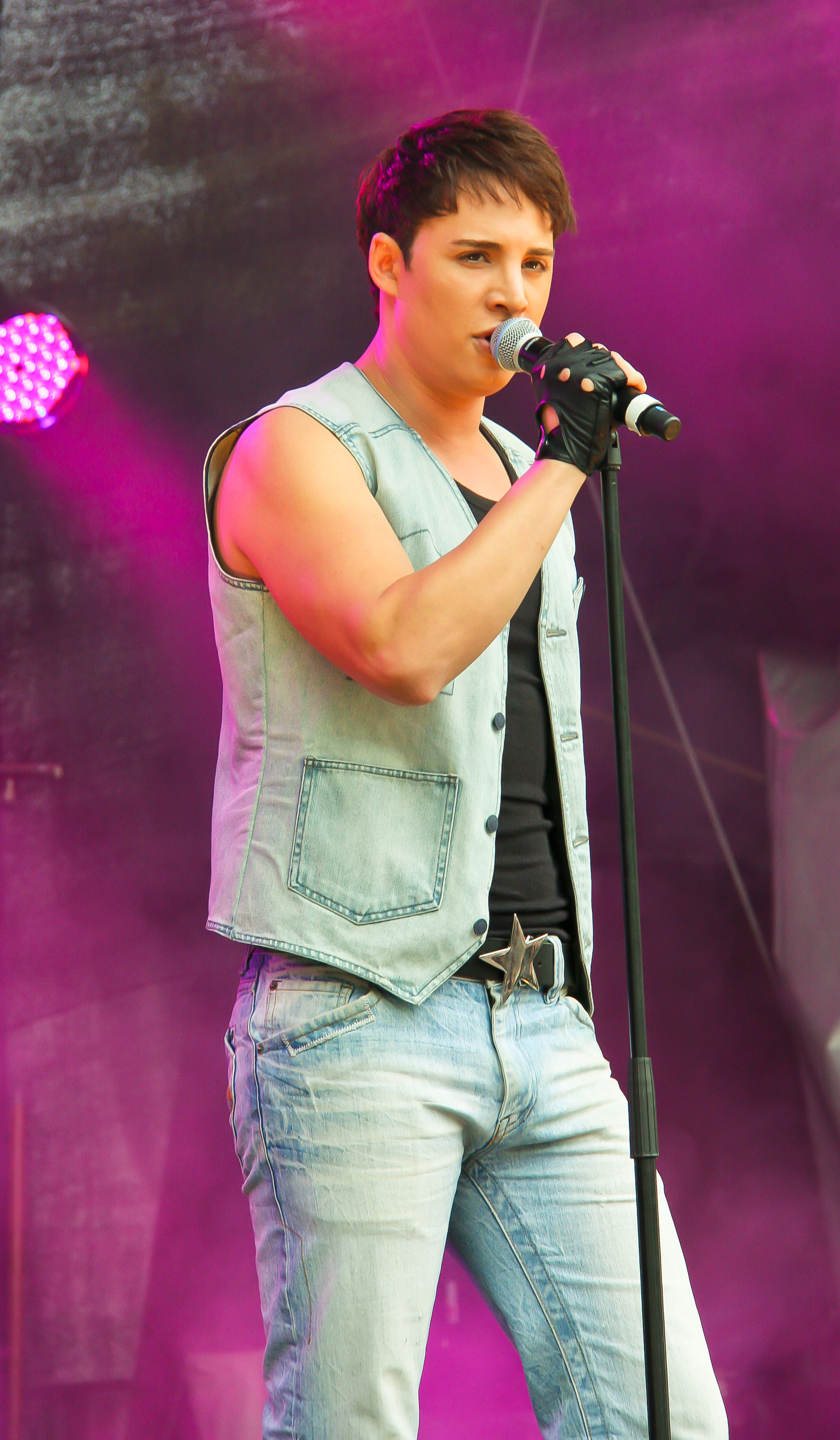
Fady Maalouf performing at 2011 Cologne Pride.

After a contract with Columbia, a subsidiary of Sony BMG Music Entertainment "Blessed" was released on 4 July 2008 as a single and went straight to no. 2 in the German single charts.

The album, also named Blessed including 14 tracks, was released on 25 July 2008, and went as well straight to no. 2 in the German album charts. These simultaneous single and album charts positions made Maalouf the most successful DSDS finalist of all time.

On 21 November 2008, Maalouf released a new single called "Amazed", a cover of a hit by the band Lonestar. This single CD included the song "Vole mon âme", the French version of "Show Me Your Love" to which Maalouf wrote the French language lyrics himself.

On 28 November 2008, Sony Music Entertainment released a new edition of Maalouf's album Blessed, including a double CD package and new unreleased tracks.

On 12 March 2010, he had his follow up album Into the Light and released the title song as a single.

In 2011, he collaborated with Russian pop singer Valeriya and toured Europe with her, recording a Russian-language song with her entitled "Ty Grustish".

In 2012, he released his third studio album entitled City of Gold, containing English, French with a special Arabic language song "Neyla" co-written by Fady Maalouf, Bernd Klimpel and Charlie Mason. Video was edited and directed by Judith Klinger and Fady Maalouf.

On 15 September 2017, he released the EP Indigo, a mixture of pop, electro and classical music, where Fady Maalouf displays in 6 tracks his abilities as a classically trained countertenor alongside his pop singing skills, therefore expanding his voice range over 4 octaves.

== Personal life ==
Besides singing, Maalouf is a songwriter and a music producer. He is also a designer and a painter.

He is also involved in charity. Soon after his success, Fady Maalouf helped to establish a charity organization Blessed E.V., named after his successful debut single "Blessed". It donates aid relief for people in need, especially in states of emergency such as war, famine and natural disaster or otherwise in distress, irrespective of their religious, political or ideological orientation. It is also active in advancement of the public healthcare and development aid.

For many years he suffered from fibromyalgia, but his symptoms have been reduced over the years. He is also a vegan and was named "Germany's Sexiest Vegan" by the animal welfare organization PETA. He lives in Berlin.

== Discography ==
=== Studio albums ===
List of albums, with selected chart positions
Title	Album details	Peak chart positions		
Title	Album details	GER	AUT	SWI
Blessed	Released: 25 July 2008; Label: Columbia; Formats: CD, digital download	2	7	7
Into the Light	Released: 12 March 2010; Label: Columbia; Formats: CD, digital download	33	42	—
City of Gold	Released: 16 November 2012; Label: Fuego; Formats: CD, digital download	—	—	—

=== EPs ===
Title
Album details
Peak positions
Notes
GER

Indigo
- Released: 15 September 2017
- Label: Timezone
- Formats: CD, digital download
—

No.	Title	Length
1.	"Lascia ch'io pianga"	3:36
2.	"Notre Père"	3:42
3.	"Swan Lake Theme"	3:32
4.	"Ave Maria"	4:44
5.	"Nessun Dorma"	2:56
6.	"Indigo"	3:40

=== Singles ===
Title	Year	Peak positions			Album
Title	Year	GER	AUT	SUI	Album
"Blessed"	2008	2	8	11	Blessed
"Amazed"	2008	26	52	—	Blessed
"Show Me Your Love"	2009	—	—	—	Blessed
"Into the Light"	2010	44	72	—	Into the Light
"Neyla"	2012	—	—	—	City of Gold
"Wenn es still um uns wird..." (featuring C'est Lena!)	2013	—	—	—	Non-alnum release
"Lascia ch'io pianga"	2017	—	—	—	Indigo
"Notre Père"	2019	—	—	—	Indigo

Other songs

- "Ya leil" ("يا ليل" in Arabic) (credited to Alex, his stage name in Lebanon prior to German success)
- "Ty Grustish" ("Ты грустишь" in Russian) (with Valeriya) (2011)

== Awards and nominations ==
- VIVA COMET 2009 – Breakthrough Artist of the year (nominated)
- VIVA COMET 2009 – Onlinestar (nominated)
