= Into the Light Indonesia =

Nonprofit organization

Into The Light Indonesia
- Formation: 1 June 2013; 13 years ago Jakarta, Indonesia
- Founder: Benny Prawira Siauw
- Type: Nonprofit organization
- Purpose: Suicide prevention
- Region served: Jakarta, Indonesia
- Volunteers: 26

Into The Light Indonesia is a youth-based community with the focus of being a centre of advocacy, research, and education related to suicide prevention and mental health issues in Indonesia. The community was founded by Benny Prawira in 2013 and established with the mission to promote awareness of suicide prevention, especially in Indonesia.

== History ==
After discovering an unusually high rate of suicide in Indonesia in 2012, Benny Prawira Siauw, the founder, along with four of his friends, formed an ad-hoc committee to commemorate 2013 World Suicide Prevention Day which was named "Into The Light". The committee was later formed as a community with a focus on suicide prevention for youth and special population groups.

One of the community's programmes involves researches related to suicide in Indonesia. The community has stated that the researches about suicide in Indonesia is minimal.

The community is actively referred to as one of the leading mental health communities or NGOs in Indonesia, with notable support from the Indonesian Ministry of Health (KEMENKES), LBH Pers, and the Indonesian Alliance of Independent Journalists (AJI).

In 2017, the community opened a peer support service, where people with suicidal thoughts may send an email to seek help. However, the service was closed in April 2018 and remains closed as of August 2018.

In 2018, the community launched a podcast, Diskusi Psikologi (Disko), in collaboration with Kantor Berita Radio (KBR), which discusses mental health issues and is spoken in Indonesian.
