= Fivefold kiss =

Element of Wiccan ritual

The Fivefold Kiss is an element of Wiccan ritual which involves blessing five sacred parts of the body. With each bestowed blessing the area of the body is sealed with a kiss. Wiccan tradition practises differ, but the Five-Fold Kiss is first and foremost a blessing bestowed upon the High Priestess by the High Priest or by the High Priestess upon the High Priest. The ritual symbolises the act of honoring the person as a vessel of the female or male version of Deity.

Each kiss given is accompanied by a blessing:

Blessed be thy feet, that have brought thee in these ways
Blessed be thy knees, that shall kneel at the sacred altar
Blessed be thy [womb/phallus], without which we would not be
Blessed be thy breasts/chest, formed in [beauty/strength]
Blessed be thy lips, that shall utter the Sacred Names.

This is the form of the blessing used by most Gardnerian and Alexandrian covens.
