= Blessed (Fady Maalouf album) =

Studio album by Fady Maalouf
- Released: 25 July 2008
- Length: 50:54
- Label: Columbia; Sony BMG
- Producer: Alex Christensen

Fady Maalouf chronology
Blessed (2008)	Into the Light (2010)

Blessed is the debut album by Lebanese-German singer Fady Maalouf. It was released by Columbia Records and Sony BMG on 25 July 2008 in German-speaking Europe, following his participation in the fifth season of Deutschland sucht den Superstar, the German version of Pop Idol, where he had finished second. Maalouf worked with German producer Alex Christensen on the entire album, while musician such as Jörgen Elofsson, Andrew Love, Peer Astrom, Per Eklund, Lauren Evans, Mike Busbee, and Maalouf himself received songwriting credits on Blessed.

The album received mixed reviews from critics, with laut.de praising Maaloufs's vocals but criticizing the Christensen's production on the songs A major commercial success, Blessed became one of the biggest-charting albums of any DSDS runner-up, debuting and peaking at number two on the German Albums Chart, while reaching number seven in Austria and Germany. Its release was preceded by the same-titled lead single, which became a number two hit on the German Singles Chart. A reissue of Blessed, containing several new recordings, was released in November 2008.

== Critical reception ==
Professional ratings
Review scores
Source	Rating
laut.de	2/5 stars

laut.de editor Dani Fromm described Blessed as "the acoustic equivalent of a déjà-vu," criticizing the album for its lack of originality, experimentation, and stylistic diversity despite promises of "latin pop, soft rock, swing, funk, soul and dance." While she acknowledged Maalouf's "powerful and expressive voice," Fromm argued that the production relied too heavily on clichés, sentimental ballads, and overused romantic phrases such as "I love you more than words can say" and "love of my life."

== Commercial performance ==
Blessed achieved moderate commercial success in the German-speaking market following its release in 2008. The album peaked at number two on the German Albums Chart, while also reaching number seven in both Austria and Switzerland. Additionally, it appeared on the German year-end albums chart for 2008, where it was ranked at number 90.

== Track listing ==
All tracks produced by Alex Christensen.

Blessed – Standard edition
No.	Title	Writer(s)	Length
1.	"Opening Night"	Didrik Thott; Carl Falk; Andrew Love	3:28
2.	"Blessed"	Jörgen Elofsson; Peer Astrom	3:27
3.	"Perfect"	Emanuel Olsson; Love	3:53
4.	"This Anchor Holds"	Per Eklund; Lauren Evans; Mathias Wollo; Mike Busbee	3:38
5.	"Against the Odds"	Alex Christensen; Peter Könemann	3:38
6.	"Good Thing"	Eklund; Mats Valentin; Johan "Jones" Wetterberg	3:09
7.	"Sway"	Matteo Saggese; Love	3:23
8.	"I Would Die for You"	Christensen; Könemann	3:13
9.	"Papillon d'amour"	Steve van Velvet; Fady Maalouf; Yvonne Parker	3:56
10.	"Show Me Your Love"	Christensen; Steffen Häfelinger	3:56
11.	"I Love to Sing With You Again"	Christensen; Häfelinger	3:17
12.	"Will You Still Love Me Tomorrow"	Christensen; Peter Könemann	3:30
13.	"Love of My Life"	Christensen; Häfelinger	3:39
14.	"One More Try"	Christensen; Häfelinger; Könemann	3:47
Total length:			50:54

Blessed – New edition
No.	Title	Writer(s)	Length
15.	"Heavenly"	Figge Boström; Pontus Söderqvist; V. DeGiorgio	3:36
16.	"Amazed"	Marv Green; Chris Lindsey; Aimee Mayo	3:59
17.	"Show Me Your Love" (Single Version)	Christensen; Häfelinger	3:37
18.	"To Let Go"	Eklund; Wollo; Alan Curtis	3:48
19.	"Driving Home for Christmas"	Chris Rea	3:49
20.	"Santa Claus Is Comin' to Town"	J. Fred Coots; Haven Gillespie	2:39

== Charts ==
=== Weekly charts ===
Weekly chart performance for Blessed
Chart (2008)	Peak position
Austrian Albums (Ö3 Austria)	7
German Albums (Offizielle Top 100)	2
Swiss Albums (Schweizer Hitparade)	7

=== Year-end charts ===
Year-end chart performance for Blessed
Chart (2008)	Position
German Albums (Offizielle Top 100)	90
