= Into the Light (song) =

Single by Fady Maalouf

from the album Into the Light
- Released: 2009
- Recorded: 2008
- Genre: Pop, Dance music
- Length: 3:33
- Label: Columbia
- Songwriters: Andy Love; Ivo Moring; Maalouf

Fady Maalouf singles chronology
"Show Me Your Love" (2009)	"Into the Light" (2009)

Music video
- "Into the Light" on YouTube

"Into the Light" is an English language hit single by Lebanese-German singer Fady Maalouf. Maalouf was a contestant in 2008 of Deutschland sucht den Superstar, the German version of Pop Idol.

It is the first single taken from the 2010 album of the same name Into the Light. Upon release it charted in German Singles Chart reaching #44 in the German Singles Chart and #72 in the Austrian Singles Chart.

== Track list ==
1. "Into the Light" (Album version)
2. "Into the Light" (Extended Club Mix)

== Chart performance ==
Chart (2010)	Peak position
German Singles Charts	44
Austrian Singles Charts	72
