= Blessed (Fady Maalouf song) =

Single by Fady Maalouf

from the album Blessed
- Released: 4 July 2008
- Recorded: 2008
- Genre: Pop
- Length: 3:27
- Label: Columbia
- Songwriter(s): Jörgen Elofsson and Peer Åström
- Producer(s): Alex Christensen

Fady Maalouf singles chronology
"Blessed" (2008)	"Amazed" (2008)

Music video
- "Blessed" on YouTube

"Blessed" is an English language hit single by Lebanese-German singer Fady Maalouf. Maalouf was a contestant in 2008 of Deutschland sucht den Superstar, the German version of Pop Idol. He sang the song for the first time on 17 May 2008 in the finals of the said competition as the "winner's song" in case he won the competition. He eventually came second (runner up) to winner Thomas Godoj. "Blessed" also appears in Fady Maalouf's debut album also entitled Blessed.

Even though Fady Maalouf did not win the title, his extraordinary voice and his charming personality had, by then, won him the hearts of an enormous fan base, which then, in an unprecedented effort, bombarded Sony BMG with letters, mails and phone calls, all demanding the same – the release of Fady Maalouf's title "Blessed", performed by him during the final show.

After a contract with Columbia, a subsidiary of Sony BMG Music Entertainment "Blessed" was released on 4 July 2008 as a single and went straight to no. 2 in the German single charts.

"Blessed" was written for Fady Maalouf by Jörgen Elofsson and Peer Åström, a songwriter team of international standing, who have worked with such names as Kelly Clarkson, Leona Lewis, Madonna, Britney Spears, Cyndi Lauper, Il Divo, and especially Céline Dion. The song is produced by Alex Christensen, who has worked with artists such as Justin Timberlake, Tom Jones, Paul Anka or Michael Bolton.

The album, also named Blessed including 14 tracks, saw the light on 25 July 2008, and went as well straight to no. 2 in the German album charts. These simultaneous single and album charts positions made Maalouf the most successful DSDS finalist of all time.

== Track list ==
CD Maxi

1. "Blessed" (Radio Version) (3:27)
2. "Will You Still Love Me Tomorrow" (3:30)
3. "Blessed" (Acoustic Version) (3:27)
4. "Blessed" (Alternative Remix) (3:20)
5. "Blessed" (Instrumental) (3:27)
6. "Blessed" (Video clip)

CD single

1. "Blessed" (Radio Version) (3:27)
2. "Blessed" (Acoustic Version) (3:27)

== Chart performance ==
Chart (2008)	Peak position
German Singles Chart	2
Ö3 Austria Top 40	8
Swiss Music Charts	11

=== Year-end charts ===
Chart (2008)	Rank
German Singles Chart	52
