= Thomas Godoj =

German pop singer

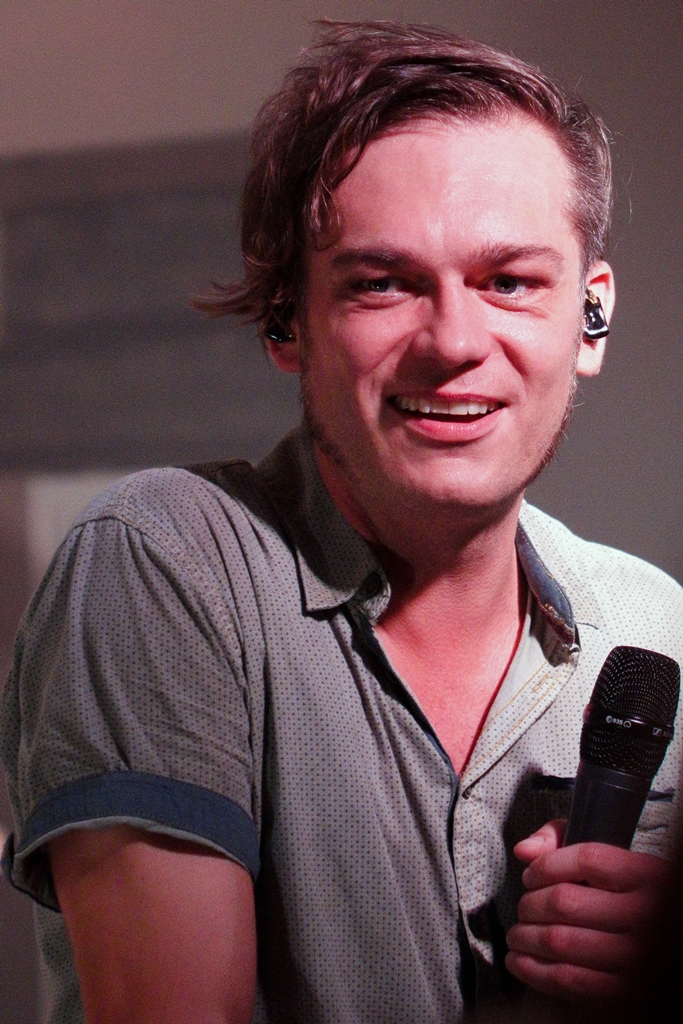
- Godoj in 2022

Background information
- Born: Tomasz Jacek Godoj; March 6, 1978 (age 48); Rybnik, Polish People's Republic
- Origin: Recklinghausen, Germany
- Genres: rock, alternative rock, hard rock, metal
- Occupations: Singer, songwriter
- Years active: 2003 (with "Cure of Souls") – present
- Label: TomZilla Musik
- Website: thomasgodoj.de

Thomas Godoj (born Tomasz Jacek Godoj; March 6, 1978) is a Polish-German rock singer and songwriter. He was the winner of the fifth season of Deutschland sucht den Superstar (2008), the German version of Pop Idol.

== Early life ==
Godoj was born on 6 March 1978 in Rybnik, Polish People's Republic (now Poland), to Danuta and Eugen Godoj. In 1988, along with his parents and his sister Hannah, he moved to Recklinghausen. Godoj then attended a secondary school and passed his specialty graduation examination for a career as a draftsman. He attended the Bochum University of Applied Sciences, specializing in civil engineering. During his studies, Godoj became interested in music and played with local bands such as Cure of Souls, Fluxkompensator, Tonk!, and WINK.

== Deutschland sucht den Superstar ==
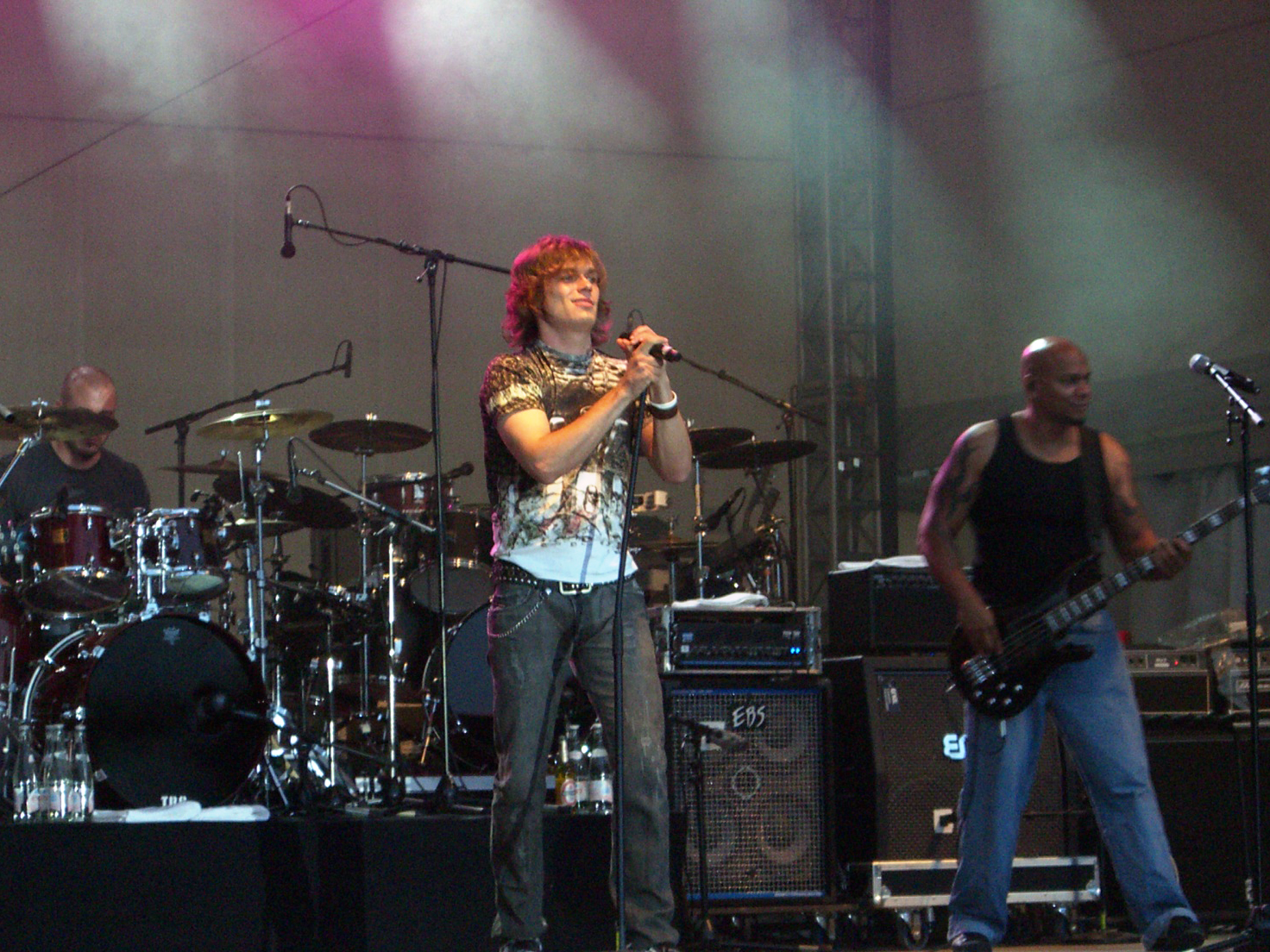
Godoj performing in 2008

In the summer of 2007, Godoj auditioned in Berlin for the fifth season of Deutschland sucht den Superstar (DSDS). The judges enjoyed his rock style and attitude and voted him on to the next round, and later into the Top 15. In the first live show, Godoj performed "Chasing Cars" by Snow Patrol and received a standing ovation over multiple minutes while the jury gave him overwhelming praise. Week after week, Godoj performed for Germany until he reached the Top 2. He won the final contest with 62.2%.

Although Thomas was a front-runner from the start of the competition, he landed in the bottom groups twice during live result shows. After the voting results were published, however, it was shown that Godoj received the highest percentage of votes every week. This places him in DSDS history, along with Mark Medlock, as a contestant with the highest number of votes each week. Technically, this would also rank Godoj with Medlock and Alexander Klaws as the only winner never in the bottom 3, as he ranked the highest every week, but the bottom group was picked at complete random. He is the second "rocker" to win the competition alongside Tobias Regner.

After the DSDS show he got back together with his ex-girlfriend Jennifer. Their first daughter Lynn Jennifer Godoj was born on 3 January 2009.

Theme	Song	Original Artist	Result
Auditions in Berlin	"Fairytale Gone Bad"	Sunrise Avenue	Advanced to Recall
Recall 1	"Wherever You Will Go"	The Calling	Advanced
Recall 2 (Group Performance)	"Here Without You"	3 Doors Down	Advanced
Recall 3	"Dieser Weg"	Xavier Naidoo	Advanced to Top 15

Theme (date)	Song	Original Artist	Place/Percentage
Top 15 Show: Jetzt oder nie (8 March 2008)	"Chasing Cars"	Snow Patrol	47.50% (1/15)
Current Hits (15 March 2008)	"Stark"	Ich + Ich	52.75% (1/10)
Greatest Film Hits (22 March 2008)	"Same Mistake"	James Blunt	39.88% (1/9)
Mariah Carey and Take That (5 April 2008)	"Rule the World"	Take That	52.10% (1/8)
Greatest Hits (12 April 2008)	"I Still Haven't Found What I'm Looking For"	U2	40.81% (1/7)
Judges' Choice (19 April 2008)	"Shadow of the Day"	Linkin Park	50.38% (1/6)
Party Songs and Ballads (26 April 2008)	"You Get What You Give"	New Radicals	50.04% (1/5)
Party Songs and Ballads (26 April 2008)	"Behind Blue Eyes"	The Who	50.04% (1/5)
Germany vs. England (3 May 2008)	"Wonderwall"	Oasis	46.83% (1/4)
Germany vs. England (3 May 2008)	"Mensch"	Herbert Grönemeyer	46.83% (1/4)
No. 1 Hits, The Beatles, Dedications (10 May 2008)	"In the Shadows"	The Rasmus	46.34% (1/3)
No. 1 Hits, The Beatles, Dedications (10 May 2008)	"Let It Be"	The Beatles	46.34% (1/3)
No. 1 Hits, The Beatles, Dedications (10 May 2008)	"Easy"	Faith No More	46.34% (1/3)
Final (17 May 2008)	"Fairytale Gone Bad"	Sunrise Avenue	62.20% (Winner)
Final (17 May 2008)	"Chasing Cars"	Snow Patrol	62.20% (Winner)
Final (17 May 2008)	"Love Is You"	Thomas Godoj	62.20% (Winner)

== Discography ==
=== Albums ===
Year	Information	Chart positions				Sales	IFPI certifications
Year	Information	GER	AUT	SWI	WOR	Sales	IFPI certifications
2008	Plan A!: Debut studio album; Released: July 4, 2008	1	1	3	18	Germany: 200,000+; Germany: 18th best-selling album of 2008	Germany: Platinum
2009	Richtung G: Second studio album; Released: November 20, 2009	15	—	—			
2011	So gewollt: Third studio album; Released: October 14, 2011	24	67	82			
2013	Männer sind so: Fourth studio album; Released: May 31, 2013	28	—	—			
2014	V: Fifth studio album; Released: October 24, 2014	51	—	—			
2016	Mundwerk: Sixth studio album; Released: September 23, 2016	29	—	—			
2018	13 Pfeile: Seventh studio album; Released: May 25, 2018	27	—	—			
2020	Stoff: Eighth studio album; Released: November 13, 2020	—	—	—			
2023	Album des Jahres: Ninth studio album; Released: November 3, 2023	—	—	—			

=== Singles ===
Year	Single	Chart positions							Album
Year	Single	GER	AUT	SWI	LIT	LUX	EUR	WOR	Album
2008	"Love Is You"	1	1	1	1	1	10	26	Plan A!
2008	"Helden gesucht" (Sought After Heroes)	12	39	98	25	29	48	—	Plan A!
2009	"Nicht allein" (Not Alone)	18	55	—	—	—	—	—	Richtung G
2010	"Uhr ohne Stunden" (Hourless Clock)	47	—	—	—	—	—	—	Richtung G
2011	"Dächer einer ganzen Stadt" (Roofs of a Whole Town)	55	—	—	—	—	—	—	So gewollt
2012	"Herzblut" (Heartblood)	—	—	—	—	—	—	—	So gewollt
2013	"Männer sind so" (Men Are Like That)	—	—	—	—	—	—	—	Männer sind so
2013	"Einfach nur anders" (Simply Different)	—	—	—	—	—	—	—	Männer sind so
2014	"Magnetisch" (Magnetic)	—	—	—	—	—	—	—	V
2016	"Mensch sein" (Being Human)	—	—	—	—	—	—	—	Mundwerk
2018	"Auf die Freiheit" (Cheers To Freedom)	—	—	—	—	—	—	—	13 Pfeile
2020	"So weit kommen" (Getting This Far)	—	—	—	—	—	—	—	Stoff
2020	"Astronaut"	—	—	—	—	—	—	—	Stoff
2020	"Lass es regnen" (Let It Rain)	—	—	—	—	—	—	—	Stoff
2022	"Neuland" (New Territory)	—	—	—	—	—	—	—	—
2023	"Endlos furchtlos" (Endless Fearless)	—	—	—	—	—	—	—	Album des Jahres
2023	"Letzter Blick" (Last Look)	—	—	—	—	—	—	—	Album des Jahres
2023	"Brücken bauen" (Building Bridges)	—	—	—	—	—	—	—	Album des Jahres

Promo singles

- 2008: "Autopilot" (radio single with video; from the album Plan A)

== Awards ==
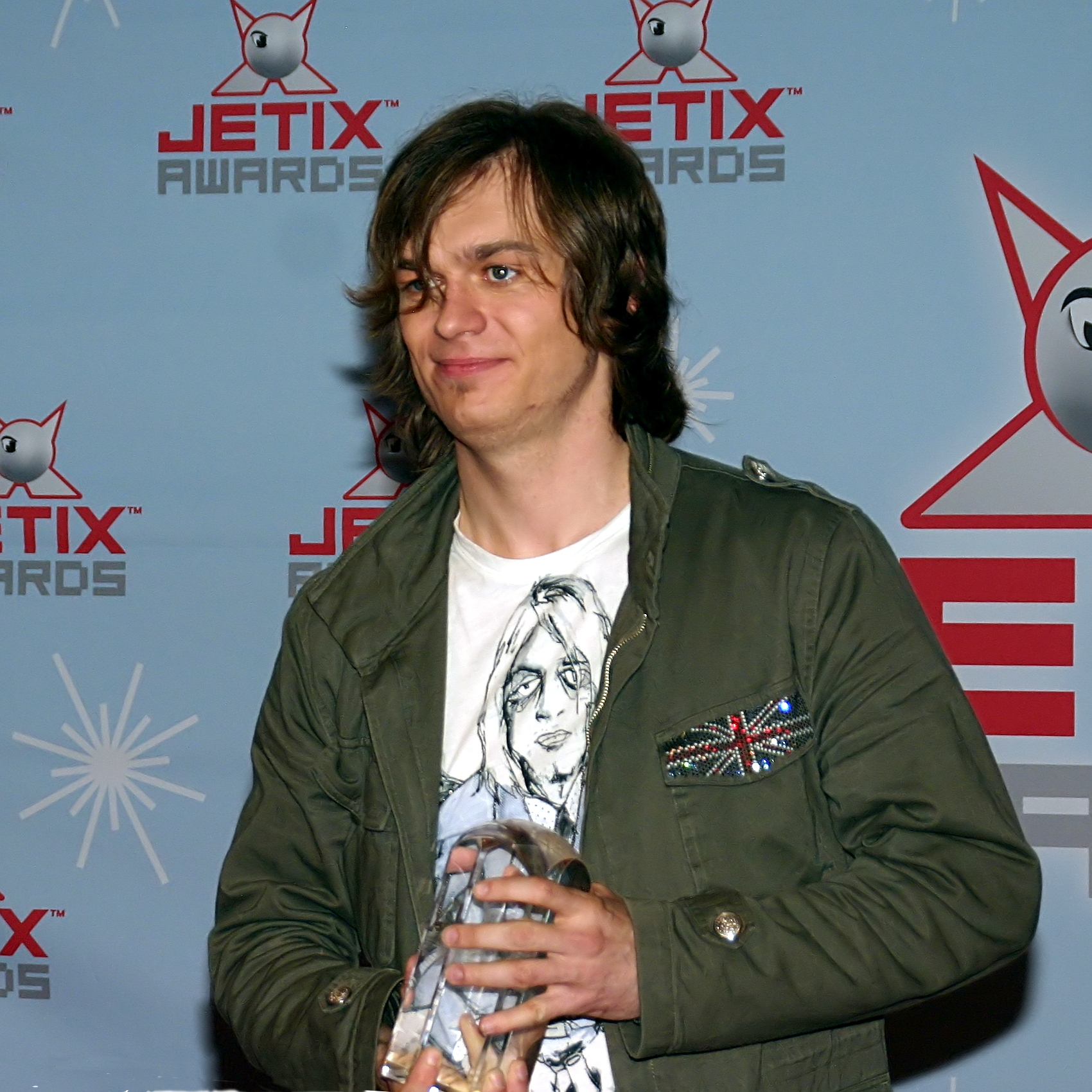
Godoj won the award of 'Newcomer of the Year' at the 2008 Jetix Awards

=== 2008 ===
- Nickelodeon Kids' Choice Awards: Favorite Singer
- Journalia 2008 (award of Polish magazine Samo Życie)
- Jetix Awards: Newcomer of the Year 2008

=== 2009 ===
- 18th Echo music awards: Best National Newcomer

Preceded by Mark Medlock	Deutschland sucht den Superstar; Winner; Season 5 (2008)	Succeeded by Daniel Schuhmacher
